= 2026–27 Nedbank Cup =

Tournament details
- Country: South Africa
- Dates: 4 January 2027 –
- Teams: 32
- All statistics correct as of 16 November 2026.

The 2026–27 Nedbank Cup is the 2026–27 edition of South Africa's premier knockout club football (soccer) competition, the Nedbank Cup. It is the 55th season of the competition, and 20th under its current sponsor.

The defending champions are the first time winners, Durban City, who defeated TS Galaxy in the final.

== Teams ==
After a preliminary round featuring eight games between teams from the 2026–27 National First Division and eight games from the SAFA Second Division, the 16 winners join the 16 teams from the Betway Premiership to enter the main draw.

== Preliminary round ==
16 teams from SAFA Leagues (National First Division and SAFA Second Division) play the preliminary round to qualify for the Round of 32.

1 December 2026 TBA	Orbit College	v	Cape Town City
SAST

1 December 2026 TBA	Hungry Lions	v	Real Native
SAST

1 December 2026 TBA	Venda FC	v	Highbury
SAST

1 December 2026 TBA	The Bees	v	Leicesterford City
SAST

2 December 2026 TBA	Upington City	v	AmaTuks
SAST

2 December 2026 TBA	Gomora United	v	NWU Soccer Institute
SAST

2 December 2026 TBA	Midlands Wanderers	v	Lerumo Lions
SAST

2 December 2026 TBA	Magesi FC	v	Hope FC
SAST

== Round of 32 ==
v

v

v

v

v

v

v

v

v

v

v

v

v

v

v

v

== Round of 16 ==
v

v

v

v

v

v

v

v

== Quarter-finals ==
v

v

v

v

== Semi-finals ==
v

v

== Final ==
v
