= 2026–27 National First Division =

Motsepe Foundation Championship
- Season: 2026–27
- Dates: 21 August 2026 - May 2027
- Matches: 32
- Goals: 63 (1.97 per match)
- Longest winning run: Magesi (4 matches)
- Longest unbeaten run: Magesi (4 matches)
- Longest winless run: NWU Soccer Institute; Orbit College; The Bees; Venda (4 matches)
- Longest losing run: The Bees (4 matches)

The 2026–27 National First Division (called the Motsepe Foundation Championship for sponsorship reasons) is the season from August 2026 to May 2027 of South Africa's second tier of professional soccer, the National First Division.

== Teams ==
=== Team changes ===
The following teams changes took place since the 2025–26 season.

Promoted to 2026–27 Premiership

- Kruger United
- Milford

Relegated from 2025–26 Premiership

- Magesi
- Orbit College

Promoted from 2025–26 SAFA Second Division

- Hope
- NWU Soccer Institute

Relegated from 2025–26 National First Division

- Baroka
- Black Leopards

Name changes

- Casric Stars changed its name to Real Native.

== Table ==
Pos	Team	Pld	W	D	L	GF	GA	GD	Pts	Promotion, qualification or relegation
1	Cape Town City	10	6	3	1	16	9	+7	21	Promotion to Premiership
2	Magesi	10	6	3	1	13	6	+7	21	Promotion Play-offs
3	Lerumo Lions	10	6	2	2	16	8	+8	20	Promotion Play-offs
4	Real Native	10	6	2	2	13	0	+13	20	
5	Hope	10	6	2	2	10	5	+5	20	
6	Hungry Lions	10	4	4	2	11	6	+5	16	
7	Upington City	10	4	4	2	14	11	+3	16	
8	Highbury	10	4	3	3	11	11	0	15	
9	NWU Soccer Institute	10	3	5	2	10	9	+1	14	
10	Leicesterford City	10	3	1	6	9	16	−7	10	
11	University of Pretoria	10	2	3	5	11	15	−4	9	
12	Gomora United	10	2	3	5	12	20	−8	9	
13	Midlands Wanderers	10	2	2	6	6	10	−4	8	
14	The Bees	10	2	1	7	5	11	−6	7	
15	Venda	10	1	3	6	7	13	−6	6	Relegation to ABC Motsepe League
16	Orbit College	10	0	5	5	5	11	−6	5	Relegation to ABC Motsepe League

Updated to match(es) played on 7 November 2026. Source: National First Division

== Results ==
As of 15 September 2026

Home \ Away	CTC	GUN	HIG	HOP	HUL	LCI	LER	MAG	MDW	NWU	ORB	RNA	BEE	TUK	UPI	VDA
Cape Town City	—				2–1	1–1										
Gomora United		—				2–4										1–0
Highbury			—	1–0				0–1								
Hope	0–2			—										1–0		
Hungry Lions		2–2			—								2–0			
Leicesterford City						—		1–3			1–0					
Lerumo Lions							—			2–0		0–1				
Magesi								—					1–0			
Midlands Wanderers								0–1	—	1–1						
NWU Soccer Institute				0–1						—					1–1	
Orbit College					0–0		1–2				—					
Real Native	2–1								1–0			—				
The Bees		0–1	1–2										—			
University of Pretoria									0–2		0–0			—		
Upington City			0–1									2–1			—	
Venda							1–1							0–2	2–3	—

Source: thenfd.co.za
Legend: Blue = home team win; Yellow = draw; Red = away team win.

== Statistics ==
=== Goalscorers ===
As of 17 October 2026

Rank	Player	Club	Goals
1	(South Africa) Kavendree Makhene	Leicesterford City	5
2	(South Africa) Tiklas Thutlwa	Gomora United	3
2	(South Africa) Leletu Skelem	Real Native	3
2	(South Africa) Palelo Mafuyeka	Upington City	3
3	(Netherlands) Rai Vloet	Cape Town City	2
3	(South Africa) Cheswyn Philander	Cape Town City	2
3	(South Africa) Unathi Funani	Highbury	2
3	(South Africa) Nyakala Raphadu	Magesi	2
3	(South Africa) Reagan Van der Ross	Hungry Lions	2
3	(South Africa) Bongane Mambane	Upington	2

== See also ==
- 2026–27 South African Premiership
- 2026–27 ABC Motsepe League
