= Nqaba Xulu =

South African soccer player

Personal information
- Date of birth: 12 August 2003 (age 23)
- Place of birth: Nongoma, South Africa
- Height: 1.80 m (5 ft 11 in)
- Position: Forward

Team information
- Current team: Richards Bay
- Number: 27

Senior career*
Years	Team	Apps	(Gls)
–2024	Njampela		
2024–2026	Milford	27	(5)
2026–	Richards Bay	8	(5)

International career
2026–	South Africa		
- * Club domestic league appearances and goals as of 30 October 2026

Nqaba Xulu (born 12 August 2003) is a South African professional soccer player who plays as a forward for South African Premiership club Richards Bay and the South Africa national team.

== Club career ==
=== Njampela ===
Xulu played for Njampela F.C. in the ABC Motsepe League. He scored a goal in the semi-final which resulted in Highbury's promotion to the National First Division.

=== Milford ===
Xulu joined the National First Division side Milford in July 2024. He was confirmed to have left the club on 7 July 2026.

=== Richards Bay ===
He joined Richards Bay as a free agent after he was released by Milford. He scored his first goal in the 2026–27 South African Premiership against Durban City on 15 August 2026. In the next match on 26 August 2026 he scored a brace against Kaizer Chiefs. Xulu scored a brace against Sekhukhune United on 18 September 2026.

The Sowetan chose Xulu as the top best signing of the 2026–27 South African Premiership.

== International career ==
Xulu was called up to the South Africa national team by Pitso Mosimane for the preliminary squad for the 2027 Africa Cup of Nations qualification matches against Kenya.

== Personal life ==
Xulu was born on 12 August 2003. He is from Nongoma.

== Career statistics ==
=== Club ===
As of match played 27 October 2026

Appearances by club, season and competition
Club	Season	League			Nedbank Cup		League Cup (Note: Includes the Carling Knockout Cup.)		Total	
Club	Season	Division	Apps	Goals	Apps	Goals	Apps	Goals	Apps	Goals
Njampela	2023–24	ABC Motsepe League	[data missing]	[data missing]	[data missing]	[data missing]	—		[data missing]	[data missing]
Milford	2024–25	National First Division	19	4	2	0	—		21	4
Milford	2025–26	National First Division	8	1	2	1	—		10	2
Richards Bay	2026–27	South African Premiership	8	5	0	0	1	1	9	6
