= 2026–27 South African Premiership =

Football league season

Betway Premiership
- Season: 2026–27
- Dates: 01 August 2026 - 22 May 2027
- Matches: 73
- Goals: 170 (2.33 per match)
- Top goalscorer: Thandolwenkosi Ngwenya (9 goals)
- Biggest home win: Milford 5-1 Richards Bay
- Biggest away win: Kruger United 0-4 Orlando Pirates
- Highest scoring: M. Sundowns 5-2 AmaZulu
- Longest winning run: Orlando Pirates (7 wins)
- Longest unbeaten run: Mamelodi Sundowns (10 matches)
- Longest winless run: Richards Bay (9 matches)
- All statistics correct as of 31 October 2026.

The 2026–27 South African Premiership is the 31st consecutive season of the South African Premiership. It is known as the Betway Premiership for sponsorship reasons, and is also commonly referred to as the PSL after the governing body.

Orlando Pirates are defending their title after ending Mamelodi Sundowns long reign as league champions. Mamelodi Sundowns had won the previous eight consecutive titles, starting in the 2017–18 season.

== Teams ==
=== Team changes ===
▲ Promoted from 2025–26 National First Division

- Kruger United
- Milford

▼ Relegated to 2026–27 National First Division

- Orbit College
- Magesi

Kruger United and Milford are playing in the Premiership for the first time.

=== Stadiums and locations ===
Stadiums

From Wikipedia, the free encyclopedia
Location of teams in the 2026–27 Premiership.

Team	Location	Stadium	Capacity
AmaZulu	Durban	Moses Mabhida Stadium	55,500
Chippa United (2 home venues)	KuGompo City and Gqeberha	Buffalo City Stadium and Nelson Mandela Bay Stadium	16,000 and 46,000
Durban City	Durban	Chatsworth Stadium	22,000
Golden Arrows	Umlazi	King Zwelithini Stadium	10,000
Kaizer Chiefs	Johannesburg (Soweto)	FNB Stadium	94,736
Kruger United	KaNyamazane	KaNyamazane Stadium	15,000
Mamelodi Sundowns	Pretoria (Marabastad)	Loftus Versfeld Stadium	51,762
Marumo Gallants	Bloemfontein	Dr. Petrus Molemela Stadium	22,000
Milford	Richards Bay	Richards Bay Stadium	10,000
Orlando Pirates	Johannesburg (Soweto)	Orlando Stadium	37,139
Polokwane City	Polokwane	Old Peter Mokaba Stadium	15,000
Richards Bay	Richards Bay	Richards Bay Stadium	10,000
Sekhukhune United	Polokwane	Peter Mokaba Stadium	45,500
Siwelele	Bloemfontein	Dr. Petrus Molemela Stadium	22,000
Stellenbosch	Stellenbosch	Danie Craven Stadium	16,000
TS Galaxy	Mbombela	Mbombela Stadium	40,929

=== Number of teams by province ===
Position	Province	Number	Teams
1	KwaZulu-Natal	5	AmaZulu, Golden Arrows, Maritzburg United, Milford, Richards Bay
2	Gauteng	3	Kaizer Chiefs, Mamelodi Sundowns, Orlando Pirates
3	Limpopo	2	Polokwane and Sekhukhune United
3	Mpumalanga	2	Kruger United and TS Galaxy
5	Eastern Cape	1	Chippa United
5	Free State	1	Siwelele
5	North West	1	Marumo Gallants
5	Western Cape	1	Stellenbosch

== League table ==
Pos	Team	Pld	W	D	L	GF	GA	GD	Pts	Qualification or relegation
1	Mamelodi Sundowns	10	8	2	0	27	9	+18	26	Qualification for CAF Champions League
2	Orlando Pirates	9	8	1	0	21	2	+19	25	Qualification for CAF Champions League
3	AmaZulu	9	7	1	1	13	8	+5	22	Qualification for CAF Confederation Cup
4	Milford	10	5	3	2	11	7	+4	18	
5	Kaizer Chiefs	9	3	5	1	14	10	+4	14	
6	Sekhukhune United	9	4	2	3	9	9	0	14	
7	Chippa United	9	2	5	2	6	7	−1	11	
8	Stellenbosch	9	2	4	3	9	10	−1	10	
9	Kruger United	9	3	1	5	7	13	−6	10	
10	Lamontville Golden Arrows	9	1	5	3	3	5	−2	8	
11	Polokwane City	9	1	5	3	8	11	−3	8	
12	TS Galaxy	9	1	4	4	7	12	−5	7	
13	Durban City	9	1	4	4	6	11	−5	7	
14	Siwelele	9	1	3	5	9	16	−7	6	
15	Marumo Gallants	9	1	2	6	9	17	−8	5	Qualification for Playoffs
16	Richards Bay	9	0	3	6	11	23	−12	3	Relegation to National First Division

Updated to match(es) played on 31 October 2026. Source: Premier Soccer League

== Results ==
As of 01 November 2026

Home \ Away	AMA	CHP	DCI	KZC	KRU	GDA	MSU	MGA	MIL	OPR	PLK	RBA	SEK	SIW	STL	TSG
AmaZulu	—					1–0		1–0		1–1				2–0		
Chippa United		—			0–1		1–1		0–0	0–3		1–1				
Durban City	1–2		—			0–0						1–1			0–0	
Kaizer Chiefs				—			1–1						2–0	3–2	1–1	
Kruger United			0–2	1–3	—					0–4		3–1			0–1	
Lamontville Golden Arrows		0–0		0–0		—	1–2		0–1						1–0	
Mamelodi Sundowns	5–2		4–1				—	2–0	2–0					3–0		
Marumo Gallants					0–0			—		0–2	2–2			3–2		2–3
Milford			1–1		2–1				—			5–1	1–0	1–0		
Orlando Pirates			2–0	2–1					2–0	—			2–0			3–0
Polokwane City	0–1			1–1					0–0		—				3–3	0–0
Richards Bay	1–2			2–2			1–4				1–2	—	2–3			
Sekhukhune United			1–0					2–1			2–0		—			0–0
Siwelele		1–1				1–1					1–0			—		2–2
Stellenbosch	0–1	0–2						3–1					1–1		—	
TS Galaxy		0–1			0–1	0–0	2–3									—

Updated to match(es) played on 31 October 2026. Source: Flashscore
Legend: Blue = home team win; Yellow = draw; Red = away team win.

== Statistics ==
Source:GOAL

=== Goals ===
As of 31 October 2026

Rank	Player	Club	Goals
1	(Zimbabwe) Thandolwenkosi Ngwenya	AmaZulu	9
2	(South Africa) Tshepang Moremi	Orlando Pirates	5
2	(South Africa) Nqaba Xulu	Richards Bay	5
4	(South Africa) Victor Letsoalo	TS Galaxy	4
4	(South Africa) Iqraam Rayners	Mamelodi Sundowns	4
4	(South Africa) Mvelo Zikakayo	Milford	4
7	(South Africa) Wandile Duba	Kaizer Chiefs	3
7	(Colombia) Brayan Leon	Mamelodi Sundowns	3
7	(South Africa) Tashreeq Matthews	Mamelodi Sundowns	3
7	(South Africa) Yanela Mbuthuma	Orlando Pirates	3

=== Assists ===
As of 31 October 2026

Rank	Player	Club	Assists
1	(South Africa) Tashreeq Matthews	Mamelodi Sundowns	4
1	(South Africa) Thapelo Mokobodi	Orlando Pirates	4
1	(South Africa) Nkosikhona Radebe	AmaZulu	4
4	(South Africa) Oswin Appollis	Orlando Pirates	3
4	(South Africa) Moses Mthembu	Richards Bay	3
4	(South Africa) Tebogo Potsane	Siwelele	3
7	(South Africa) Menzi Chili	Milford	2
7	(South Africa) Raoul Daniels	Stellenbosch	2
7	(Eswatini) Justice Figuareido	Chippa United	2
7	(South Africa) Tshepo Kakora	TS Galaxy	2

=== Red Cards ===
As of 31 October 2026

Rank	Player	Club	Red card
1	(South Africa) Menzi Chili	Milford	1
1	(Angola) Inácio Miguel	Kaizer Chiefs	1
1	(South Africa) Edgar Manaka	Marumo Gallants	1
1	(South Africa) Sipho Maseti	TS Galaxy	1
1	(South Africa) Katlego Mohamme	Kruger United	1
1	(South Africa) Thendo Mukumela	Kruger United	1
1	(South Africa) Thabiso Sesane	Siwelele	1
1	(South Africa) Lindokuhle Zikhali	Richards Bay	1
1	(South Africa) Veluyeke Zulu	TS Galaxy	1

=== Yellow Cards ===
As of 31 October 2026

Rank	Player	Club	Yellow card
1	(South Africa) Cebolenkosi Mthethwa	Milford	4
1	(South Africa) Ebrahim Seedat	Kruger United	4
1	(South Africa) Luthando Vena	Stellenbosch	4
4	(Angola) Inácio Miguel	Kaizer Chiefs	3
4	(South Africa) Thato Letshedi	Siwelele	3
4	(South Africa) Surprise Manthosi	Polokwane City	3
4	(South Africa) Mlondi Mncwango	TS Galaxy	3
4	(South Africa) Banele Mnguni	Polokwane City	3
4	(South Africa) Lehlohonolo Mojela	Sekhukhune United	3
4	(South Africa) Thabo Moloisane	Kaizer Chiefs	3

== See also ==
- 2026–27 National First Division
- 2026-27 ABC Motsepe League
