= Clinton Larsen =

South African soccer player and manager

Personal information
- Full name: Clinton Paul Larsen
- Date of birth: 17 February 1971 (age 55)
- Place of birth: Durban, South Africa
- Position: Midfielder

Team information
- Current team: Highbury (Manager)

Senior career*
Years	Team	Apps	(Gls)
1991–1992	Crusaders United	29	(1)
1992–1999	Manning Rangers	246	(14)
1999–2001	Orlando Pirates	31	(0)
2001–2003	Manning Rangers	45	(0)

International career
1997	South Africa	2	(0)

Managerial career
- 2010–2013: Bloemfontein Celtic
- 2013: Maritzburg United
- 2014: Roses United
- 2014–2015: Bloemfontein Celtic
- 2015–2018: Golden Arrows
- 2019: Chippa United
- 2019–2020: Polokwane City
- 2021–2023: Summerfield Dynamos
- 2023–2024: Magesi
- 2025–2026: Venda
- 2026-: Highbury
- * Club domestic league appearances and goals

Clinton Larsen (born 17 February 1971 in Durban, KwaZulu-Natal) is a South African former football player who is the manager of Highbury in the National First Division.

== Coaching career ==
Larsen joined Magesi in 2023, leading them the 2023–24 National First Division title and promotion to the Premiership and the 2024 Carling Knockout Cup the following season. With club bottom of the log, Larsen resigned in December 2024.

Larsen joined Venda in 2025. After a poor start to the 2026–27 National First Division season, with the club earning one point from their first five games, Larsen was dismissed by Venda in September 2026.

Later the same year, Larsen joined Highbury as manager.
