= Jabulani Shongwe =

South African soccer player (born 1990)

Personal information
- Full name: Jabulani Vusumuzi Shongwe
- Date of birth: 28 February 1990 (age 36)
- Place of birth: Witbank, South Africa
- Position: Midfielder

Team information
- Current team: Upington City
- Number: 3

Youth career
- School of Excellence
- Mamelodi Sundowns

Senior career*
Years	Team	Apps	(Gls)
2010–2014	Mamelodi Sundowns	26	(1)
2014	→ Bidvest Wits (loan)	12	(1)
2014–2018	Bidvest Wits	53	(3)
2017–2018	→ Golden Arrows (loan)	19	(2)
2018–2019	Chippa United	6	(0)
2019–2020	Highlands Park	6	(0)
2020	Royal Eagles	6	(0)
2021	Royal AM	1	(0)
2021–2022	Venda	13	(1)
2023–2024	Pretoria Callies	19	(2)
2024–	Upington City	8	(0)

International career^{‡}
2013–	South Africa	7	(1)
- * Club domestic league appearances and goals as of 14 November 2024 ‡ National team caps and goals as of 22:23, 4 June 2019 (UTC)

Jabulani Shongwe (born 28 February 1990) is a South African soccer player who plays as a midfielder for South African club Upington City.

== International career ==
=== International goals ===
Scores and results list South Africa's goal tally first.

Goal	Date	Venue	Opponent	Score	Result	Competition
1.	13 July 2013	Nkoloma Stadium, Lusaka, Zambia	Namibia	1–0	2–1	Friendly
