= 2022–23 SAFA Second Division =

SAFA Second Division
- Season: 2022–23
- Champions: Upington City
- Promoted: Upington City, Orbit College

The 2022–23 SAFA Second Division (known as the ABC Motsepe League for sponsorship reasons) was the 25th season of the SAFA Second Division, the third tier for South African association football clubs, since its establishment in 1998. Due to the size of South Africa, the competition was split into nine divisions, one for each region. After the league stage of the regional competition was completed, the nine winning teams of each regional division entered the playoffs.

Upington City from the Northern Cape, and Orbit College from the North West qualified for the final, with both earning promotion to the 2023–24 National First Division.

Upington City defeated Orbit College 3-1 in the final, with Upington City taking R1.2 million in prize money, and Orbit R600,000.

== Regions ==
=== Eastern Cape ===
==== Stream A ====
Pos	Team	Pld	W	D	L	GF	GA	GD	Pts	Qualification or relegation
1	Amavarara	16	10	4	2	28	11	+17	34	Playoffs
2	Sinenkani	16	8	5	3	28	15	+13	29	
3	FC Ravens	16	7	7	2	21	10	+11	28	
4	AmaMpondo United	16	7	3	6	20	18	+2	24	
5	Highbury FC	16	5	8	3	23	21	+2	23	
6	Matta Milan	16	5	3	8	14	21	−7	18	
7	Thohoyandou FC	16	4	3	9	11	18	−7	15	
8	Bush Bucks	16	3	6	7	15	23	−8	15	
9	Champion FC	16	2	3	11	10	33	−23	9	

Source: https://diskizone.com/abc-motsepe-eastern-cape-log/

==== Stream B ====
Pos	Team	Pld	W	D	L	GF	GA	GD	Pts	Qualification or relegation
1	Peace Makers FC	16	9	4	3	26	13	+13	31	Playoffs
2	FC Siyanda	16	9	3	4	29	17	+12	30	
3	Bush Pirates	16	9	3	4	26	14	+12	30	
4	Amaxesibe FC	16	6	4	6	19	21	−2	22	
5	Relatives FC	16	5	6	5	15	24	−9	21	
6	Hanley FC	16	4	8	4	15	14	+1	20	
7	Seven Stars	16	3	8	5	17	22	−5	17	
8	Bizana Pondo Chiefs	16	3	4	9	14	21	−7	13	
9	FC Jacaranda	16	1	6	9	16	31	−15	9	

Source: https://diskizone.com/abc-motsepe-eastern-cape-log/

=== Free State ===
==== Stream A ====
Pos	Team	Pld	W	D	L	GF	GA	GD	Pts	Qualification or relegation
1	Buffalo FC	16	10	3	3	25	19	+6	33	Playoffs
2	D General FC	16	8	8	0	28	10	+18	32	
3	Dikwena United	16	8	6	2	28	12	+16	30	
4	African Warriors	16	7	8	1	21	10	+11	29	
5	Marquard Dynamos	16	5	8	3	21	18	+3	23	
6	Clever Boys	16	3	5	8	13	19	−6	14	
7	Bloemfontein Young Tigers	16	2	6	8	16	26	−10	12	
8	FC Spartans	16	2	4	10	12	27	−15	10	
9	Welkom Real Stars	16	1	4	11	10	33	−23	7	

Source: https://diskizone.com/abc-motsepe-free-state-log/

==== Stream B ====
Pos	Team	Pld	W	D	L	GF	GA	GD	Pts	Qualification or relegation
1	FC Black Cross	16	13	1	2	39	18	+21	40	Playoffs
2	Mangaung Unite	16	11	3	2	35	11	+24	36	
3	Mathaithai	16	7	3	6	26	24	+2	24	
4	Sibanye Golden Stars	16	7	1	8	29	33	−4	22	
5	Central University	16	6	3	7	23	19	+4	21	
6	Peace Lovers	16	5	3	8	16	24	−8	18	
7	Bloemfontein Eagles	16	5	2	9	17	21	−4	17	
8	FC Matjhabeng	16	4	4	8	28	33	−5	16	
9	Small Tigers	16	4	0	12	17	47	−30	12	

Source: https://diskizone.com/abc-motsepe-free-state-log/

=== Gauteng ===
Pos	Team	Pld	W	D	L	GF	GA	GD	Pts	Qualification or relegation
1	Dondol Stars	36	24	8	4	66	17	+49	80	Playoffs
2	Pele Pele	36	22	7	7	78	34	+44	73	
3	Jomo Cosmos	36	22	7	7	54	28	+26	73	
4	Soweto Super United	36	21	10	5	56	34	+22	73	
5	Highlands Park	36	19	12	5	50	19	+31	69	
6	African All Stars	36	21	5	10	55	38	+17	68	
7	Hollywood Thunder	36	16	10	10	38	25	+13	58	
8	M Tigers	36	15	12	9	65	40	+25	57	
9	JBM FC	36	16	6	14	54	44	+10	54	
10	Wits University	36	14	10	12	43	41	+2	52	
11	Dube Continental	36	13	8	15	60	59	+1	47	
12	ZK	36	11	7	18	39	54	−15	40	
13	Ally's Tigers	36	10	10	16	34	52	−18	40	
14	Senaoane Gunners	36	10	7	19	43	64	−21	37	
15	Mamelodi Newcastle	36	10	5	21	32	59	−27	35	
16	Tembisa Sports Centre	36	8	10	18	40	59	−19	34	
17	Leruma United	36	9	6	21	39	58	−19	33	
18	FC MaLions	36	3	7	26	20	68	−48	16	
19	Casric F.C.	36	3	3	30	22	95	−73	12	

Source: https://diskizone.com/abc-motsepe-gauteng-log/

=== Kwazulu-Natal ===
==== Stream A ====
Pos	Team	Pld	W	D	L	GF	GA	GD	Pts	Qualification or relegation
1	Milford FC	18	12	5	1	27	7	+20	41	Playoffs
2	Mkhumbane Classic	18	12	3	3	28	12	+16	39	
3	Stone Breakers	18	11	4	3	34	19	+15	37	
4	Summerfield Dynamos	18	11	4	3	25	10	+15	37	
5	Njampela FC	18	10	3	5	34	19	+15	33	
6	Muzi King Masters	18	5	5	8	14	19	−5	20	
7	Happy Wanderers	18	3	6	9	14	25	−11	15	
8	Mtuba All Stars	18	4	1	13	19	32	−13	13	
9	Asande FC	18	2	4	12	12	35	−23	10	
10	Mkwakhwini Classic	18	2	1	15	16	45	−29	7	

Source: https://diskizone.com/abc-motsepe-kwazulu-natal-log/

==== Stream B ====
Pos	Team	Pld	W	D	L	GF	GA	GD	Pts	Qualification or relegation
1	uMsinga United	18	11	5	2	31	10	+21	38	Playoffs
2	GWP Friends	18	11	5	2	28	9	+19	38	
3	Mkhambathi FC	18	10	6	2	28	12	+16	36	
4	Midlands Wanderers	18	10	3	5	26	13	+13	33	
5	Newcastle All Stars	18	8	7	3	24	20	+4	31	
6	Ethekwini Coastal	18	7	1	10	19	22	−3	22	
7	Umvoti	18	5	6	7	15	10	+5	21	
8	Drakensberg FC	18	5	4	9	17	29	−12	19	
9	Durban Pioneers	18	2	4	12	19	32	−13	10	
10	XI Experience	18	0	1	17	8	58	−50	1	

Source: https://diskizone.com/abc-motsepe-kwazulu-natal-log/

=== Limpopo ===
==== Stream A ====
Pos	Team	Pld	W	D	L	GF	GA	GD	Pts	Qualification or relegation
1	Mpheni Home Defenders	16	15	0	1	30	5	+25	45	Playoffs
2	Giyani Happy Boys	16	11	3	2	32	18	+14	36	
3	United Artists	16	6	4	6	11	11	0	22	
4	Emmanuel FC	16	5	4	7	19	25	−6	19	
5	Bellevue Village Winners Park	16	4	5	7	14	15	−1	17	
6	Vondwe XI Bullets	16	4	5	7	18	22	−4	17	
7	Munaca FC	16	4	4	8	16	17	−1	16	
8	Musina United	16	4	4	8	14	23	−9	16	
9	Mikhado FC	16	3	3	10	6	24	−18	12	

Source: https://diskizone.com/abc-motsepe-limpopo-log/

==== Stream B ====
Pos	Team	Pld	W	D	L	GF	GA	GD	Pts	Qualification or relegation
1	The Dolphins	16	13	1	2	28	6	+22	40	Playoffs
2	Ngwaabe City Motors FC	16	12	3	1	32	7	+25	39	
3	Mighty F.C.	15	7	2	6	18	22	−4	23	
4	Tzaneen United	16	6	3	7	23	23	0	21	
5	Tubatse United	15	6	3	6	25	26	−1	21	
6	Eleven Fast Tigers	15	5	3	7	17	23	−6	18	
7	Ditlou F.C.	16	5	2	9	21	26	−5	17	
8	PJ Stars	16	3	2	11	9	24	−15	11	
9	Phinnet F.C.	13	2	1	10	9	25	−16	7	

Source: https://diskizone.com/abc-motsepe-limpopo-log/

=== Mpumalanga ===
==== Stream A ====
Pos	Team	Pld	W	D	L	GF	GA	GD	Pts	Qualification or relegation
1	Secunda M Stars	16	9	6	1	24	11	+13	33	Playoffs
2	Fernie Battalion FC	16	10	3	3	31	19	+12	33	
3	Sivutsa Stars	16	8	4	4	24	16	+8	28	
4	Middelburg United	16	8	4	4	23	15	+8	28	
5	Mpumalanga Football Academy	16	6	3	7	20	20	0	21	
6	Passion FC	16	4	6	6	21	26	−5	18	
7	Kanyamazane All Stars	16	5	2	9	15	20	−5	17	
8	Witbank Citylads	16	4	3	9	14	21	−7	15	
9	Witbank Shepard	16	1	3	12	11	35	−24	6	

Source: https://diskizone.com/abc-motsepe-mpumalanga-log/

==== Stream B ====
Pos	Team	Pld	W	D	L	GF	GA	GD	Pts	Qualification or relegation
1	Mlambo Royal Cubs	15	10	2	3	29	14	+15	32	Playoffs
2	Barberton All Stars	16	9	2	5	35	21	+14	29	
3	Gemsbok Classic	16	8	5	3	24	14	+10	29	
4	Destiny College	15	7	5	3	20	13	+7	26	
5	Sibange Young Bucks	15	6	5	4	20	14	+6	23	
6	Bakoena Chiefs	16	4	6	6	24	27	−3	18	
7	Phaphama FC	16	4	4	8	19	25	−6	16	
8	Flymingo United FC	15	1	6	8	11	27	−16	9	
9	Kabokweni Future Stars	12	1	1	10	5	32	−27	4	

Source: https://diskizone.com/abc-motsepe-mpumalanga-log/

=== North West ===
==== Stream A ====
Pos	Team	Pld	W	D	L	GF	GA	GD	Pts	Qualification or relegation
1	Orbit College	15	13	1	1	40	6	+34	40	Playoffs
2	Som United	15	10	1	4	20	11	+9	31	
3	Stilfontein Real Hearts	15	7	3	5	22	19	+3	24	
4	Kgositlile FC	15	7	2	6	20	23	−3	23	
5	Army Rockets FC	14	5	2	7	17	25	−8	17	
6	Thaba Tshwane FC	15	3	5	7	19	31	−12	14	
7	NW Signal	14	3	3	8	14	21	−7	12	
8	NWU Tawana	14	3	0	11	16	30	−14	9	
9	Rustenburg FC	5	1	1	3	4	6	−2	4	

Source: https://diskizone.com/abc-motsepe-north-west-log/

==== Stream B ====
Pos	Team	Pld	W	D	L	GF	GA	GD	Pts	Qualification or relegation
1	North West University	15	11	2	2	38	12	+26	35	Playoffs
2	Bokone FC	15	10	1	4	31	18	+13	31	
3	Black Eagles	15	8	5	2	21	11	+10	29	
4	Mahika Champions	15	4	6	5	18	16	+2	18	
5	FC Maberethe	15	4	6	5	15	23	−8	18	
6	City Rovers	14	5	2	7	20	23	−3	17	
7	TUT FC	15	4	3	8	17	19	−2	15	
8	Taung Mega Stars	15	2	1	12	9	38	−29	7	
9	Manong FC	7	2	0	5	3	12	−9	6	

Source: https://diskizone.com/abc-motsepe-north-west-log/

=== Northern Cape ===
==== Stream A ====
Pos	Team	Pld	W	D	L	GF	GA	GD	Pts	Qualification or relegation
1	Upington City	16	12	3	1	27	7	+20	39	Playoffs
2	Kakamas Juventus	16	11	2	3	28	11	+17	35	
3	NC Professionals	16	8	2	6	26	13	+13	26	
4	Tornado FC	16	8	1	7	27	22	+5	25	
5	Benfica FC	16	7	1	8	15	18	−3	22	
6	Olympics	16	5	5	6	24	28	−4	20	
7	Kakamas Sundowns	16	6	2	8	21	25	−4	20	
8	Olifantshoek Sporting	16	4	4	8	18	23	−5	16	
9	Olifantshoek Young Stars	16	0	2	14	9	48	−39	2	

Source: https://diskizone.com/abc-motsepe-northern-cape-log/

==== Stream B ====
Pos	Team	Pld	W	D	L	GF	GA	GD	Pts	Qualification or relegation
1	Diamond City	16	12	3	1	49	15	+34	39	Playoffs
2	Postmasburg FC	16	10	4	2	24	7	+17	34	
3	United Rovers	16	8	2	6	33	32	+1	26	
4	Jacksa Spears	16	7	4	5	32	28	+4	25	
5	Tsantshabane Stars FC	16	7	3	6	25	16	+9	24	
6	Warrenvale Stars	16	7	0	9	18	24	−6	21	
7	Rasta Far Eagles	16	4	2	10	19	35	−16	14	
8	Kuruman Scorpions	16	3	3	10	14	33	−19	12	
9	Colville United	16	3	1	12	12	36	−24	10	

Source: https://diskizone.com/abc-motsepe-northern-cape-log/

=== Western Cape ===
==== Stream A ====
Pos	Team	Pld	W	D	L	GF	GA	GD	Pts	Qualification or relegation
1	Zizwe United	16	11	2	3	25	12	+13	35	Playoffs
2	Hout Bay United	16	11	0	5	38	19	+19	33	
3	Santos	16	7	4	5	25	20	+5	25	
4	Grassy Park United	16	7	4	5	17	17	0	25	
5	Maties FC	16	7	1	8	31	27	+4	22	
6	City Kings	16	6	4	6	21	19	+2	22	
7	Ikapa Sporting	16	5	3	8	16	26	−10	18	
8	Cape Town Spurs Youth	16	4	3	9	17	29	−12	15	
9	Mbekweni Sundowns	16	2	3	11	23	44	−21	9	

Source: https://diskizone.com/abc-motsepe-western-cape-log/

==== Stream B ====
Pos	Team	Pld	W	D	L	GF	GA	GD	Pts	Qualification or relegation
1	Young Bafana	16	10	4	2	31	17	+14	34	Playoffs
2	Ubuntu Cape Town	16	10	2	4	35	23	+12	32	
3	Clarewood JPM FC	16	9	3	4	36	13	+23	30	
4	FN Rangers	16	9	3	4	31	13	+18	30	
5	Hanover Park FC	16	8	3	5	39	19	+20	27	
6	Batalion FC	16	7	4	5	18	23	−5	25	
7	Ukhanya United	16	2	4	10	12	33	−21	10	
8	Royal Blues	16	2	3	11	13	38	−25	9	
9	Wanderers FC	16	1	2	13	10	46	−36	5	

Source: https://diskizone.com/abc-motsepe-western-cape-log/

== Playoff stage ==
Western Cape winners Young Bafana were pulled from the playoffs a week before they started after losing an arbitration case lodged by rivals Zizwe United regarding playing with unregistered players. However, hours before kickoff, the ruling was set aside by the Gauteng High Court and Young Bafana entered the playoffs.

=== Semi-finals ===
The semifinal between hosts Umsinga United and Orbit College at Harry Gwala Stadium was marred by violence. Orbit College won 1–0, and at the end of the match, fans invaded the pitch, gunshots were fired, while Umsinga United's goalkeeper coach Gezani Zondi was struck on the head and needed medical attention.

Upington City beat Mpheni Home Defenders of Limpopo 3–2 on penalties after a 1–1 draw in the first semi-final of the day, while Orbit College broke many hearts in a crowded Harry Gwala Stadium when they beat local side Umsinga United 1–0 in the second semi-final.

9 June 2023

Upington City	1 - 1	Mpheni Home Defenders
Penalties
	3–2

Harry Gwala Stadium
9 June 2023

Umsinga United	0 - 1	Orbit College

Harry Gwala Stadium

=== Playoff final ===
11 June 2023

Upington City	3 - 1	Orbit College

Harry Gwala Stadium
