= Tshediso Patjie =

South African soccer player

Personal information
- Date of birth: 4 November 1990 (age 36)
- Position: Midfielder

Team information
- Current team: Kruger United

Senior career*
Years	Team	Apps	(Gls)
2015–2018	Mbombela United	49	(11)
2018–2021	Baroka	58	(6)
2021–2022	Sekhukhune United	26	(1)
2022–2024	Moroka Swallows	27	(1)
2024	Baroka	7	(1)
2024–	Kruger United	10	(0)
- * Club domestic league appearances and goals as of 14 November 2024

Tshediso Patjie (born 4 November 1990) is a South African soccer player who plays as a midfielder for South African First Division side Kruger United.
