= 2025–26 National First Division =

Motsepe Foundation Championship
- Season: 2025–26
- Champions: Kruger United
- Promoted: Kruger United; Milford
- Relegated: Baroka, Black Leopards
- Top goalscorer: Ntuthuko Mlotshwa, Lerumo Lions (13 goals)

The 2025–26 National First Division (called the Motsepe Foundation Championship for sponsorship reasons) is the season from August 2025 to May 2026 of South Africa's second tier of professional soccer, the National First Division.

It was won by Kruger United. Baroka and Black Leopards were relegated.

== Teams ==
=== Team changes ===
The following teams changes took place since the 2024–25 season.

Promoted to 2025–26 Premiership

- Durban City
- Orbit College

Relegated from 2024–25 Premiership

- Cape Town City

Promoted from 2024–25 SAFA Second Division

- Gomora United
- The Bees
- Midlands Wanderers

Relegated from 2024–25 National First Division

- Cape Town Spurs
- Leruma United

Purchases

- Lerumo Lions purchased the status of Pretoria Callies.
- Leicesterford City purchased JDR Stars.

== Table ==
Pos	Team	Pld	W	D	L	GF	GA	GD	Pts	Promotion, qualification or relegation
1	Kruger United (C, P)	30	18	8	4	50	34	+16	62	Promotion to Premiership
2	Cape Town City	30	15	9	6	45	23	+22	54	Promotion Play-offs
3	Milford (P)	30	16	6	8	40	24	+16	54	Promotion Play-offs
4	Casric Stars	30	14	10	6	46	27	+19	52	
5	Hungry Lions	30	14	10	6	41	25	+16	52	
6	Highbury	30	12	6	12	30	33	−3	42	
7	Upington City	30	10	9	11	35	33	+2	39	
8	Lerumo Lions	30	10	9	11	36	36	0	39	
9	Venda	30	9	9	12	24	29	−5	36	
10	The Bees	30	9	8	13	37	36	+1	35	
11	University of Pretoria	30	8	11	11	37	41	−4	35	
12	Leicesterford City	30	9	7	14	25	43	−18	34	
13	Gomora United	30	6	15	9	28	39	−11	33	
14	Midlands Wanderers	30	8	9	13	28	44	−16	33	
15	Black Leopards (R)	30	6	10	14	26	38	−12	28	Relegation to ABC Motsepe League
16	Baroka (R)	30	4	8	18	20	43	−23	20	Relegation to ABC Motsepe League

Source: National First Division
(C) Champions; (P) Promoted to PSL; (R) Relegated

== Play-offs ==
=== Table ===
Pos	Lge	Team	Pld	W	D	L	GF	GA	GD	Pts	Qualification
1	NFD	Milford	4	2	1	1	3	2	+1	7	Promoted to the 2026-27 Premiership
2	PRE	Magesi	4	1	2	1	4	3	+1	5	
3	NFD	Cape Town City	4	1	1	2	2	4	−2	4	

Source: https://www.psl.co.za/tournament/promotion-playoffs
Rules for classification: 1) Points; 2) Goal difference; 3) Number of goals scored;

=== Results ===
Home \ Away	CTC	MAG	MIL
Cape Town City	—	1–1	0–1
Magesi	2–0	—	1–1
Milford	0–1	1–0	—

Source: https://www.psl.co.za/tournament/promotion-playoffs/]
Legend: Blue = home team win; Yellow = draw; Red = away team win.

== See also ==
- 2025-26 South African Premiership
- 2025-26 ABC Motsepe League
