= Yanela Mbuthuma =

South African soccer player

Personal information
- Date of birth: 23 February 2002 (age 24)
- Place of birth: Harding, South Africa
- Height: 1.75 m (5 ft 9 in)
- Position: Forward

Team information
- Current team: Orlando Pirates
- Number: 9

Youth career
- 2018: Thohoyandou
- United Strikers
- Langa United
- KZN Academy

Senior career*
Years	Team	Apps	(Gls)
2020–2021	M-City		
2021–2022	Thohoyandou		
2022–2025	Richards Bay	71	(8)
2025–	Orlando Pirates	31	(8)

International career^{‡}
2023	South Africa U23		
2025–	South Africa	3	(0)
- * Club domestic league appearances and goals as of 1 November 2026 ‡ National team caps and goals as of 1 November 2025

Yanela Mbuthuma (born 23 February 2002) is a South African soccer player who plays as a forward for the South African Premiership club Orlando Pirates and the South Africa national team.

== Early life ==
Mbuthuma was born on 23 February 2002 in Harding. He joined Thohoyandou in 2018 and initially played as a goalkeeper before he switched to playing as a forward at United Strikers. Mbuthuma later played for Langa United and KZN Academy.

== Club career ==
Mbuthuma played for M-City in the LFA Super League, helping the team earn promotion to the SAB Regional League. He was a player for Thohoyandou in the ABC Motsepe League, before he joined the South African Premiership club Richards Bay in June 2022. He was discovered by Richards Bay at the Khabba Cup, where he was designated "player of the tournament". He subsequently made his first-tier debut in the 2022–23 South African Premiership. His first goal was the winning goal against Sekhukhune United in August 2022. He made 27 appearances and scored six goals for Richards Bay during the 2024–25 season.

It was reported Orlando Pirates were interested in signing Mbuthuma in December 2024. Mbuthuma joined Orlando Pirates in June 2025. He came off the bench and scored a brace against Lioli of the Lesotho Premier League in the second leg of the first round of the 2025–26 CAF Champions League. He scored a goal against Saint–Éloi Lupopo of Linafoot, the top division in the Democratic Republic of the Congo, and missed the final kick in the shootout in the second round. He scored a brace against Kruger United and a goal against Kaizer Chiefs during the 2026–27 South African Premiership. He scored a goal in the second leg of the first round of the 2026–27 CAF Champions League against La Cure Waves of the Mauritian Premier League.

== International career ==
Mbuthuma was called up to the South Africa national under-23 soccer team for 2023 U-23 Africa Cup of Nations qualification. He was named in the preliminary South Africa national soccer B team squad for the 2023 COSAFA Cup. He was called up to the senior South Africa national team by Hugo Broos for the friendlies against Tanzania and Mozambique in 2025. He made his debut for South Africa against Mozambique on 10 June 2025. He was called up to the national team by Pitso Mosimane for the 2027 Africa Cup of Nations qualification matches against Guinea and Eritrea, and for the friendly against Egypt in 2026.

== Career statistics ==
=== Club ===
As of match played 31 October 2026

Appearances by club, season and competition
Club	Season	League			Nedbank Cup		Knockout Cup		Continental (Note: Includes the CAF Champions League.)		MTN 8		Total	
Club	Season	Division	Apps	Goals	Apps	Goals	Apps	Goals	Apps	Goals	Apps	Goals	Apps	Goals
M-City	2020–21	LFA Super League	[data missing]	[data missing]	–		–		–		–		[data missing]	[data missing]
Thohoyandou	2021–22	ABC Motsepe League	[data missing]	[data missing]	[data missing]	[data missing]	–		–		–		[data missing]	[data missing]
Richards Bay	2022–23	South African Premiership	24	1	1	0	0	0	—		–		25	1
Richards Bay	2023–24	South African Premiership	23	2	1	0	3	1	—		–		27	3
Richards Bay	2024–25	South African Premiership	24	5	1	1	2	0	—		–		27	6
Richards Bay	Total		71	8	3	1	5	1	–		–		79	10
Orlando Pirates	2025–26	South African Premiership	24	5	2	0	3	0	3	3	1	0	33	8
Orlando Pirates	2026–27	South African Premiership	7	3	0	0	1	0	2	1	4	0	14	4
Orlando Pirates	Total		31	8	2	0	4	0	5	4	5	0	47	12
Career total			102	16	5	1	9	1	5	4	5	0	126	22

=== International ===
As of match played 4 October 2026

Appearances and goals by national team and year
National team	Year	Apps	Goals
South Africa	2025	1	0
South Africa	2026	2	0
Total		3	0
