= 2019–20 SAFA Second Division =

SAFA Second Division
- Season: 2019–20
- Champions: Bizana Pondo Chiefs
- Promoted: Bizana Pondo Chiefs; Pretoria Callies

The 2019–20 SAFA Second Division (known as the ABC Motsepe League for sponsorship reasons) was the 22nd season of the SAFA Second Division, the third tier for South African association football clubs, since its establishment in 1998. Due to the size of South Africa, the competition was split into nine divisions, one for each region. After the league stage of the regional competition is completed, the nine winning teams of each regional division entered the playoffs.

The competition was won by Bizana Pondo Chiefs, who defeated Pretoria Callies on penalties in the final, with both teams earning promotion to the National First Division. Chiefs earned R1 million in prize money, while Callies earned R500,000.

== Regions ==
=== Eastern Cape ===
Pos	Team	Pld	W	D	L	GF	GA	GD	Pts	Qualification or relegation
1	Bizano Pondo Chiefs	22	14	5	3	66	29	+37	47	Playoffs
2	Spear of the Nation	21	13	7	1	47	16	+31	46	
3	Matta Milan	22	13	6	3	33	15	+18	45	
4	Bush Bucks	21	12	6	3	35	16	+19	42	
5	PE Stars	22	10	7	5	33	28	+5	37	
6	Amavarara	21	10	5	6	36	26	+10	35	
7	Peace Makers FC	21	10	3	8	31	31	0	33	
8	Birmingham City	21	10	3	8	30	30	0	33	
9	Mthatha Bucks	21	5	9	7	23	27	−4	24	
10	Highbury F.C.	21	6	3	12	24	33	−9	21	
11	Bush Pirates	22	6	3	13	23	37	−14	21	
12	Yaka United	22	5	3	14	23	41	−18	18	
13	Swartkops Valley United Brothers	22	4	5	13	21	46	−25	17	
14	Bisho Stars	21	3	6	12	19	45	−26	15	
15	Sibanye FC	22	2	5	15	17	41	−24	11	
16	Tornado F.C.	0	0	0	0	0	0	0	0	

Source: https://diskizone.com/table/abc-motsepe-eastern-cape-log-2019-2020/

=== Free State ===
Pos	Team	Pld	W	D	L	GF	GA	GD	Pts	Qualification or relegation
1	Mangaung Unite	25	18	5	2	48	15	+33	59	Playoffs
2	Super Eagles	25	18	4	3	58	25	+33	58	
3	D General FC	25	15	6	4	57	26	+31	51	
4	Bloemfontein Young Tigers	25	13	4	8	45	32	+13	43	
5	Sibanye Golden Stars	25	12	4	9	43	44	−1	40	
6	Central University	25	9	11	5	32	34	−2	38	
7	Dikwena United	25	11	3	11	44	44	0	36	
8	Caledon FC	25	10	3	12	42	54	−12	33	
9	Bloemfontein Celtic Development	25	8	8	9	44	33	+11	32	
10	Small Tigers	25	7	8	10	38	47	−9	29	
11	Mphatlalatsane United	25	7	7	11	33	42	−9	28	
12	Harmony FC	25	6	8	11	23	33	−10	26	
13	Questus FC	25	6	7	12	31	36	−5	25	
14	Knowledge Glen	25	5	9	11	31	38	−7	24	
15	Kovsies	25	5	9	11	22	33	−11	24	
16	Lijabatho FC	25	0	4	21	17	72	−55	4	

Source: https://diskizone.com/table/abc-motsepe-free-state-log-2019-2020/

=== Gauteng ===
Pos	Team	Pld	W	D	L	GF	GA	GD	Pts	Qualification or relegation
1	Pretoria Callies	23	15	5	3	34	15	+19	50	Playoffs
2	Pele Pele	23	12	9	2	41	25	+16	45	
3	Baberwa	22	13	5	4	38	19	+19	44	
4	Vaal Professionals	23	13	4	6	36	21	+15	43	
5	La Masia	23	11	5	7	33	23	+10	38	
6	African All Stars	23	11	3	9	22	22	0	36	
7	Blue Lions	23	8	8	7	37	32	+5	32	
8	Dondol Stars	24	7	9	8	38	33	+5	30	
9	Dube Continental	23	7	9	7	27	29	−2	30	
10	Alexandra Black Aces	23	7	6	10	22	28	−6	27	
11	Tembisa Sports Centre	23	8	3	12	29	45	−16	27	
12	Mamelodi All Stars	23	6	7	10	24	39	−15	25	
13	Leruma United	23	7	3	13	24	30	−6	24	
14	AJ United	23	4	8	11	19	27	−8	20	
15	M Tigers	24	4	7	13	28	35	−7	19	
16	FC RESA	22	3	5	14	19	48	−29	14	

Source: https://diskizone.com/table/abc-motsepe-gauteng-log-2019-2020/

=== Kwazulu-Natal ===
Pos	Team	Pld	W	D	L	GF	GA	GD	Pts	Qualification or relegation
1	Umvoti	24	18	6	0	45	15	+30	60	Playoffs
2	Summerfield Dynamos	24	17	6	1	57	14	+43	57	
3	KwaDabeka Sporting	23	16	5	2	42	16	+26	53	
4	Happy Wanderers	24	16	5	3	39	19	+20	53	
5	GWP Friends	24	10	6	8	36	34	+2	36	
6	Milford FC	22	11	2	9	25	19	+6	35	
7	Natal Rich Boys	23	10	4	9	33	28	+5	34	
8	Muzi King Masters	24	9	2	13	23	29	−6	29	
9	Durban FC	24	8	2	14	29	30	−1	26	
10	XI Experience	24	7	5	12	23	43	−20	26	
11	Raimham Sporting	24	7	4	13	25	42	−17	25	
12	Movers FC	24	6	6	12	17	31	−14	24	
13	Qwabe United	24	6	4	14	21	31	−10	22	
14	Zululand Warriors	24	5	5	14	23	43	−20	20	
15	Natal United	24	5	3	16	30	48	−18	18	
16	Edendale Juventus	24	4	5	15	16	42	−26	17	

Source: https://diskizone.com/table/abc-motsepe-kzn-log-2019-2020/

=== Limpopo ===
Pos	Team	Pld	W	D	L	GF	GA	GD	Pts	Qualification or relegation
1	Mikhado FC	24	16	4	4	52	28	+24	52	Playoffs
2	Magesi F.C.	24	14	6	4	59	29	+30	48	
3	The Dolphins	24	13	8	3	37	18	+19	47	
4	Eleven Fast Tigers	24	12	8	4	35	19	+16	44	
5	Ngwaabe City Motors FC	24	9	6	9	40	35	+5	33	
6	Venda Football Academy	24	9	6	9	29	25	+4	33	
7	Giyani Happy Boys	24	7	9	8	35	31	+4	30	
8	TRON F.C.	24	8	5	11	37	48	−11	29	
9	Mighty F.C.	24	6	10	8	35	38	−3	28	
10	Ditlou F.C.	24	6	10	8	33	36	−3	28	
11	Makotopong Brazil FC	24	6	9	9	35	41	−6	27	
12	Ndengeza FC	24	7	6	11	27	43	−16	27	
13	Polokwane United	24	7	5	12	23	43	−20	26	
14	Berachah Valley F.C.	24	5	10	9	36	39	−3	25	
15	Ollesdas FC	24	6	6	12	25	50	−25	24	
16	Polokwane City Academy	24	2	10	12	24	39	−15	16	

Source: https://diskizone.com/table/abc-motsepe-limpopo-log-2019-2020/

=== Mpumalanga ===
Pos	Team	Pld	W	D	L	GF	GA	GD	Pts	Qualification or relegation
1	Mpumalanga United	22	13	6	3	39	19	+20	45	Playoffs
2	Barberton City Stars	22	13	3	6	47	20	+27	42	
3	Witbank Shepard	23	11	7	5	33	23	+10	40	
4	Sivutsa Stars	22	10	9	3	40	18	+22	39	
5	Witbank Citylads	22	11	5	6	33	23	+10	38	
6	Secunda M Stars	23	10	7	6	29	22	+7	37	
7	VOC United FC	23	9	9	5	35	22	+13	36	
8	Gemsbok Classic	22	10	6	6	33	32	+1	36	
9	Bakone FC	22	11	1	10	29	23	+6	34	
10	Mlambo Royal Cubs	22	6	7	9	23	27	−4	25	
11	Nkomazi Royal Aces	23	7	3	13	29	38	−9	24	
12	Mbombela City Lads	23	6	6	11	24	37	−13	24	
13	Passion FC	22	6	5	11	22	28	−6	23	
14	Sabie Bayern	22	3	5	14	12	49	−37	14	
15	BTM Sports	23	0	5	18	16	63	−47	5	
16	Toronto FC	0	0	0	0	0	0	0	0	

Source: https://diskizone.com/table/abc-motsepe-mpumalanga-log-2019-2020/

=== North West ===
Pos	Team	Pld	W	D	L	GF	GA	GD	Pts	Qualification or relegation
1	Polokwane City Rovers	23	19	4	0	54	9	+45	61	Playoffs
2	Orbit College	24	16	8	0	42	10	+32	56	
3	Ally's Tigers	24	14	3	7	42	22	+20	45	
4	Stilfontein Real Hearts	24	13	4	7	51	47	+4	43	
5	Buya Msuthu F.C.	24	12	6	6	47	24	+23	42	
6	Young Zebras F.C.	23	9	7	7	40	28	+12	34	
7	Makapanstad Romans F.C.	24	8	7	9	30	24	+6	31	
8	Thaba Tshwane FC	24	9	4	11	27	40	−13	31	
9	North West University	24	8	5	11	36	33	+3	29	
10	Marauding Classic	24	7	7	10	27	35	−8	28	
11	Luka Ball Controllers	23	6	9	8	28	23	+5	27	
12	Master Peace	24	7	6	11	29	37	−8	27	
13	Tigane United	24	5	6	13	23	56	−33	21	
14	Captain Eleven	23	3	5	15	22	42	−20	14	
15	Newcastle United	25	3	3	19	18	74	−56	12	
16	Glamour Boys	11	2	2	7	7	19	−12	8	

Source: https://diskizone.com/table/abc-motsepe-north-west-log-2019-2020/

=== Northern Cape ===
Pos	Team	Pld	W	D	L	GF	GA	GD	Pts	Qualification or relegation
1	Hungry Lions	21	15	6	0	50	11	+39	51	Playoffs
2	NC Professionals	22	14	5	3	59	17	+42	47	
3	Kakamas Sundowns	22	14	4	4	51	21	+30	46	
4	Northern Cape Liverpool	22	12	6	4	40	26	+14	42	
5	Rasta Far Eagles	22	11	5	6	40	35	+5	38	
6	Tornado FC	22	10	6	6	37	25	+12	36	
7	United Rovers	22	9	3	10	35	41	−6	30	
8	Mainstay United	22	9	2	11	38	40	−2	29	
9	Conville United	21	6	6	9	35	38	−3	24	
10	Tsantshabane Stars FC	21	6	6	9	34	37	−3	24	
11	Kakamas Juventus	22	7	3	12	35	44	−9	24	
12	Olifantshoek Young Stars	22	5	5	12	31	43	−12	20	
13	Maruping United	21	4	7	10	22	51	−29	19	
14	Magareng Young Stars	21	3	8	10	22	33	−11	17	
15	Kuruman Kicks F.C.	21	4	4	13	13	40	−27	16	
16	Khumalo Chiefs	22	3	6	13	32	72	−40	15	

Source: https://diskizone.com/table/abc-motsepe-northern-cape-log-2019-2020/

=== Western Cape ===
Pos	Team	Pld	W	D	L	GF	GA	GD	Pts	Qualification or relegation
1	Zizwe United	18	14	4	0	38	13	+25	46	Playoffs
2	FN Rangers	19	12	6	1	41	17	+24	42	
3	Glendene United	18	12	3	3	38	16	+22	39	
4	Norway Parks Magic	19	10	4	5	36	20	+16	34	
5	Ikapa Sporting	19	7	10	2	24	18	+6	31	
6	Grassy Park United	18	7	8	3	31	18	+13	29	
7	Batalion FC	19	7	7	5	19	15	+4	28	
8	Mbekweni Cosmos	19	7	5	7	30	27	+3	26	
9	Hout Bay United	19	7	4	8	26	31	−5	25	
10	Ajax Cape Town Youth	19	7	2	10	43	36	+7	23	
11	Royal Blues	17	6	2	9	23	38	−15	20	
12	Santos	16	6	2	8	14	20	−6	20	
13	Ubuntu Cape Town	17	4	4	9	23	38	−15	16	
14	Morning Stars	19	1	6	12	22	48	−26	9	
15	Jomos Power	18	1	3	14	27	58	−31	6	
16	Barcelona	18	0	6	12	10	42	−32	6	

Source: https://diskizone.com/table/abc-motsepe-western-cape-log-2019-2020/

== Playoff stage ==
=== Group A ===
Pos	Team	Pld	W	D	L	GF	GA	GD	Pts
1	Umvoti	3	2	0	1	4	2	+2	6
2	Hungry Lions	2	1	0	1	2	2	0	3
3	Mpumalanga United	2	0	0	2	3	5	−2	0

Source: https://diskizone.com/table/abc-motsepe-promotion-playoff-group-a-log-2019-2020/

=== Group B ===
Pos	Team	Pld	W	D	L	GF	GA	GD	Pts
1	Bizana Pondo Chiefs	2	2	0	0	3	1	+2	6
2	Mangaung Unite	2	1	0	1	4	3	+1	3
3	Mikhado	2	0	0	2	1	4	−3	0

Source: https://diskizone.com/table/abc-motsepe-promotion-playoff-group-b-log-2019-2020/

=== Group C ===
Pos	Team	Pld	W	D	L	GF	GA	GD	Pts
1	Pretoria Callies	2	2	0	0	2	0	+2	6
2	Zizwe United	2	1	0	1	2	2	0	3
3	Polokwane City Rovers	2	0	0	2	1	3	−2	0

Source: https://diskizone.com/table/abc-motsepe-promotion-playoff-group-c-log-2019-2020/

=== Semi-finals ===
12 November 2020

Umvoti	0 - 0	Bizana Pondo Chiefs
	Report
Penalties
	3–4

Vaal University of Technology
14 November 2020

Pretoria Callies	3 - 1	Mangaung Unite
	Report

Vaal University of Technology

=== Playoff final ===
14 November 2020

Pretoria Callies	1 - 1	Bizana Pondo Chiefs
	Report
Penalties
	4–5

Vaal University of Technology
