= Duncan Lechesa =

South African soccer player and coach (born 1976)

Personal information
- Full name: Duncan Thaane Lechesa
- Date of birth: 26 July 1976 (age 50)
- Place of birth: Bloemfontein, South Africa
- Position: Midfielder

Youth career
- 2005–2006: Black Leopards

Senior career*
Years	Team	Apps	(Gls)
2006–2010	Free State Stars	81	(6)

Managerial career
- 2010–2011: Carara Kicks
- 2011–2013: Carara Kicks (assistant coach)
- 2013: Polokwane City
- 2013–2014: FC Cape Town
- 2014: Royal Eagles
- 2023–2024: Venda
- 2024–2026: Marumo Gallants (assistant coach)
- 2026: The Bees
- * Club domestic league appearances and goals as of 3 October 2026

Duncan Thaane Lechesa (born 26 July 1976) is a retired South African soccer player who was most recently coach of National First Division team The Bees.

== Career ==
In a 15-year career, Lechesa played as a central midfielder for Bloemfontein Celtic, Ajax Cape Town, Black Leopards and Free State Stars before retiring in 2010. Born in Bloemfontein, Free State, Lechesa began playing football with Bloemfontein Celtic's youth sides before signing with National First Division club Bloemfontein Young Tigers. He started 24 league matches during his final season with Stars, winning the club's Player of the Season award.

After he retired from playing, Lechesa became a football coach. He was appointed manager of Carara Kicks in 2010. He had a brief stint with United FC in 2011, but returned to Carara Kicks. Lechesa joined Polokwane City in January 2013, and led them to promotion to the Premiership within six months. He parted ways with Polokwane City on 16 September 2013 after the club had lost their opening 4 games of the 2013–14 Premiership season. Lechesa was appointed the head coach of F.C. Cape Town on 22 October 2013, but resigned in March 2014
