= 2025–26 South African Premiership =

Football league season

Betway Premiership
- Season: 2025–26
- Dates: 9 August 2025 – 23 May 2026
- Champions: Orlando Pirates (5th title); 10th South African title
- Relegated: Orbit College; Magesi
- Champions League: Orlando Pirates; Mamelodi Sundowns
- Confederation Cup: Kaizer Chiefs; Durban City
- Matches: 240
- Goals: 485 (2.02 per match)
- Top goalscorer: Junior Dion (14 goals)
- Biggest home win: Orlando Pirates 5-0 Lamontville Golden Arrows
- Biggest away win: TS Galaxy 0–6 Orlando Pirates
- Highest scoring: Mamelodi Sundowns 7–4 Siwelele
- Longest winning run: Mamelodi Sundowns; 10 matches
- Longest unbeaten run: Orlando Pirates; 14 matches
- Longest winless run: TS Galaxy; 13 matches
- Longest losing run: TS Galaxy; 4 matches
- Highest attendance: 88,120 (Orlando Pirates 1-1 Kaizer Chiefs)
- All statistics correct as of 23 May 2026.

The 2025–26 South African Premiership was the 30th consecutive season of the South African Premiership. It was known as the Betway Premiership for sponsorship reasons, and also commonly referred to as the PSL after the governing body.

The Orlando Pirates won their fifth league title and first since the 2011–12 South African Premiership season thus ending Mamelodi Sundowns reign as league champions. The Mamelodi Sundowns were defending the title they have won for eight consecutive years, the streak starting in the 2017–18 season. The Kaizer Chiefs drew an average home attendance of 20,347, the highest in the league.

== Teams ==
=== Team changes ===
▲ Promoted from 2024–25 National First Division

- Durban City
- Orbit College

▼ Relegated to 2025–26 National First Division

- Cape Town City

▼ Expelled

- Royal AM

=== Purchased statuses ===
- Siwelele purchased the status from three-time champions SuperSport United.

Orbit College and Siwelele will be playing in the Premiership for the first time. Durban City previously played as Maritzburg United.

=== Stadiums and locations ===
Stadiums

Location of teams in the 2025–26 Premiership.

Team	Location	Stadium	Capacity
AmaZulu	Durban	Moses Mabhida Stadium	55,500
Chippa United	East London	Buffalo City Stadium	16,000
Durban City	Durban	Chatsworth Stadium	22,000
Golden Arrows	Umlazi	King Zwelithini Stadium	10,000
Kaizer Chiefs	Johannesburg (Soweto)	FNB Stadium	94,736
Magesi	Seshego	Seshego Stadium	15,000
Mamelodi Sundowns	Pretoria (Marabastad)	Loftus Versfeld Stadium	51,762
Marumo Gallants	Bloemfontein	Dr. Petrus Molemela Stadium	22,000
Orbit College	Rustenburg	Olympia Park	32,000
Orlando Pirates	Johannesburg (Soweto)	Orlando Stadium	37,139
Polokwane City	Polokwane	Old Peter Mokaba Stadium	15,000
Richards Bay	Richards Bay	Richards Bay Stadium	8,000
Sekhukhune United	Polokwane	Peter Mokaba Stadium	45,500
Siwelele	Bloemfontein	Dr. Petrus Molemela Stadium	22,000
Stellenbosch	Stellenbosch	Danie Craven Stadium	16,000
TS Galaxy	Mbombela	Mbombela Stadium	40,929

== League table ==
Pos	Team	Pld	W	D	L	GF	GA	GD	Pts	Qualification or relegation
1	Orlando Pirates (C)	30	21	6	3	58	12	+46	69	Qualification for CAF Champions League
2	Mamelodi Sundowns	30	20	8	2	57	21	+36	68	Qualification for CAF Champions League
3	Kaizer Chiefs	30	15	9	6	33	19	+14	54	Qualification for CAF Confederation Cup
4	AmaZulu	30	13	8	9	32	28	+4	47	
5	Sekhukhune United	30	11	11	8	32	27	+5	44	
6	Lamontville Golden Arrows	30	11	8	11	34	33	+1	41	
7	Polokwane City	30	9	13	8	21	21	0	40	
8	Durban City	30	10	9	11	25	26	−1	39	Qualification for CAF Confederation Cup
9	Stellenbosch	30	9	10	11	26	30	−4	37	
10	Siwelele	30	8	13	9	24	28	−4	37	
11	Richards Bay	30	7	13	10	23	30	−7	34	
12	TS Galaxy	30	8	8	14	30	38	−8	32	
13	Chippa United	30	6	10	14	24	44	−20	28	
14	Marumo Gallants	30	4	13	13	21	38	−17	25	
15	Magesi (R)	30	5	9	16	24	43	−19	24	Qualification for Playoffs
16	Orbit College (R)	30	6	6	18	21	47	−26	24	Relegation to National First Division

Source: Premier Soccer League
(C) Champions; (R) Relegated

== Results ==
As of 23 May 2026

Home \ Away	AMA	CHP	DCI	KZC	GDA	MAG	MSU	MGA	ORB	OPR	PLK	RBA	SEK	SIW	STL	TSG
AmaZulu	—	5–1	1–0	0–1	1–1	0–0	0–1	1–0	1–0	0–2	0–1	2–1	2–2	2–0	2–1	3–2
Chippa United	0–3	—	2–0	0–0	0–2	0–0	1–1	1–3	2–1	0–3	1–1	3–0	1–3	1–0	0–0	1–4
Durban City	0–1	1–0	—	0–1	1–1	3–1	0–1	1–0	1–1	0–2	1–0	1–0	1–1	2–0	0–0	2–0
Kaizer Chiefs	1–1	0–1	1–0	—	1–0	2–0	0–0	1–1	4–1	0–3	1–0	1–0	1–3	0–0	1–2	2–0
Lamontville Golden Arrows	0–1	0–0	1–0	0–1	—	2–1	1–0	4–0	3–0	1–3	0–0	1–0	1–0	0–0	1–1	0–0
Magesi	1–1	2–2	5–2	1–4	0–2	—	0–2	3–0	1–2	0–3	0–2	1–0	0–1	2–0	1–1	2–1
Mamelodi Sundowns	2–0	4–1	3–1	1–1	2–1	3–0	—	3–1	2–0	1–1	3–0	4–1	3–1	7–4	1–1	1–0
Marumo Gallants	0–1	2–1	0–1	0–1	1–2	1–1	1–1	—	0–0	2–1	1–1	1–1	1–1	0–0	0–0	1–1
Orbit College	0–0	0–1	0–3	1–3	1–2	3–1	0–2	1–1	—	0–2	1–0	0–0	0–3	1–0	1–2	1–3
Orlando Pirates	3–0	2–0	0–0	1–1	5–0	2–0	1–2	3–0	1–0	—	1–0	2–0	0–1	1–1	1–0	2–0
Polokwane City	0–1	2–1	0–0	0–0	2–1	0–0	0–1	1–1	2–2	1–2	—	1–1	1–0	0–0	1–0	0–0
Richards Bay	2–0	1–0	0–0	1–0	2–2	1–0	0–0	1–2	1–2	2–2	0–0	—	1–1	1–1	2–1	1–1
Sekhukhune United	1–1	1–1	2–0	0–2	1–0	1–0	0–2	1–1	2–0	0–0	0–0	1–1	—	2–2	0–1	1–0
Siwelele	1–1	0–0	2–2	2–0	3–1	1–0	1–1	1–0	1–0	0–1	0–1	0–0	1–0	—	0–0	1–0
Stellenbosch	1–0	2–1	0–0	0–2	4–3	1–1	0–1	1–0	2–0	0–2	1–2	0–1	3–1	0–2	—	1–1
TS Galaxy	3–1	1–1	0–2	0–0	2–1	0–0	3–2	2–0	1–2	0–6	1–2	0–1	0–1	2–0	2–0	—

Updated to match(es) played on 23 May 2026. Source: Flashscore
Legend: Blue = home team win; Yellow = draw; Red = away team win.

== Statistics ==
=== Goals ===
As of 16 May 2026

Rank	Player	Club	Goals
1	(Chad) (Ivory Coast) Junior Dion	Lamontville Golden Arrows	14
2	(South Africa) Iqraam Rayners	Mamelodi Sundowns	12
3	(Colombia) Brayan León	Mamelodi Sundowns	10
3	(South Africa) Relebohile Mofokeng	Orlando Pirates	10
5	(South Africa) Oswin Appollis	Orlando Pirates	9
6	(South Africa) Bradley Grobler	Sekhukhune United	8
6	(Guinea-Bissau) (Portugal) Flávio Silva	Kaizer Chiefs	8
6	(South Africa) Patrick Maswanganyi	Orlando Pirates	8
6	(South Africa) Tashreeq Matthews	Mamelodi Sundowns	8
10	(South Africa) Langelihle Phili	Stellenbosch	7
11	(Zimbabwe) Thandolwenkosi Ngwenya	AmaZulu	6
11	(South Africa) Sinoxolo Kwayiba	Chippa United	6
11	(South Africa) Seluleko Mahlambi	TS Galaxy	6
11	(South Africa) Evidence Makgopa	Orlando Pirates	6
15	(South Africa) Tshegofatso Mabasa	Stellenbosch	5
15	(South Africa) Athini Maqokola	AmaZulu	5
15	(South Africa) Mduduzi Shabalala	Kaizer Chiefs	5
15	(South Africa) Yanela Mbuthuma	Orlando Pirates	5
15	(South Africa) Tshepang Moremi	Orlando Pirates	5
15	(South Africa) Pule Ekstein	AmaZulu	5
15	(Chile) Marcelo Allende	Mamelodi Sundowns	5
15	(Democratic Republic of the Congo) Jean Lwamba	Durban City	5
15	(Zambia) Gamphani Lungu	Siwelele	5

=== Assists ===
As of 9 May 2026

Rank	Player	Club	Assists
1	(Namibia) Deon Hotto	Orlando Pirates	8
1	(South Africa) Relebohile Mofokeng	Orlando Pirates	8
3	(South Africa) Siyanda Ndlovu	Lamontville Golden Arrows	6
3	(South Africa) Keletso Makgalwa	Sekhukhune United	6
3	(South Africa) Oswin Appollis	Orlando Pirates	6
3	(South Africa) Devin Titus	Stellenbosch	6
7	(South Africa) Philani Khumalo	Lamontville Golden Arrows	5
7	(Brazil) Arthur Sales	Mamelodi Sundowns	5
7	(South Africa) Saziso Magawana	Durban City	5
10	(South Africa) Puso Dithejane	TS Galaxy	4
10	(South Africa) Tshepang Moremi	Orlando Pirates	4
10	(South Africa) Tebogo Potsane	Siwelele	4
10	(Portugal) Nuno Santos	Mamelodi Sundowns	4
10	(South Africa) Tashreeq Matthews	Mamelodi Sundowns	4
10	(South Africa) Mcedi Vandala	Magesi	4
10	(South Africa) Puleng Marema	Polokwane City	4
10	(South Africa) Monnapule Saleng	Mamelodi Sundowns/Orbit College	4
10	(Eswatini) Justice Figuareido	Chippa United	4

=== Clean sheets ===
As of 23 May 2026

Rank	Player	Club	Matches	Clean sheets
1	(South Africa) Sipho Chaine	Orlando Pirates	30	21
2	(South Africa) Brandon Peterson	Kaizer Chiefs	23	14
3	(South Africa) Ricardo Goss	Siwelele	27	13
3	(South Africa) Ronwen Williams	Mamelodi Sundowns	29	13
5	(South Africa) Darren Keet	Durban City	26	12
6	(Kenya) Ian Otieno	Richards Bay	23	10
7	(South Africa) Renaldo Leaner	Sekhukhune United	16	9
7	(South Africa) Darren Johnson	AmaZulu	17	9

== See also ==
- 2025–26 National First Division
- 2025-26 ABC Motsepe League
