= Roy-Keane Avontuur =

South African soccer player (born 2003)

Personal information
- Date of birth: 21 August 2003 (age 23)
- Place of birth: Atlantis, South Africa
- Height: 1.79 m (5 ft 10 in)
- Position: Forward

Team information
- Current team: La Masia (on loan from Stellenbosch)

Youth career
- Atlantis Athletico
- Hellenic
- 2020: Stellenbosch

Senior career*
Years	Team	Apps	(Gls)
2020–	Stellenbosch	5	(0)
2024–	→ La Masia (loan)	3	(0)

International career
- South Africa U17
- * Club domestic league appearances and goals as of 22 March 2024

Roy-Keane Avontuur (born 21 August 2003) is a South African professional soccer player who plays as a forward for La Masia on loan from South African Premier Division club Stellenbosch.

== Club career ==
Born in Atlantis, South Africa, Avontuur began his footballing career at the age of four with local side Atlantis Athletico. He played for professional side Hellenic, where he won a number of awards, before joining South African Premier Division side Stellenbosch in 2020, having impressed on trial.

He signed a professional deal with the club, and was promoted to the first team, going on to make his debut on 25 October 2020, coming on as a second-half substitute for Leletu Skelem in a 1–1 DStv Premiership draw with Moroka Swallows. In July 2022, having lost his place in the first team, he scored against his namesake Roy Keane's former club, Nottingham Forest, in the Next Gen Cup, a reserve competition.

== International career ==
Avontuur has represented South Africa at under-17 level, making his debut in 2017 at the age of fourteen.

== Career statistics ==
=== Club ===
As of 18 April 2023

Appearances and goals by club, season and competition
Club	Season	League			Cup		Other		Total	
Club	Season	Division	Apps	Goals	Apps	Goals	Apps	Goals	Apps	Goals
Stellenbosch	2020–21	South African Premier Division	5	0	0	0	0	0	5	0
Stellenbosch	2021–22	South African Premier Division	0	0	0	0	0	0	0	0
Stellenbosch	2022–23	South African Premier Division	0	0	0	0	0	0	0	0
Career total			5	0	0	0	0	0	5	0
