= Nicholas Motloung =

South African soccer player

Personal information
- Date of birth: 5 September 1995 (age 31)
- Position: Defender

Team information
- Current team: Venda

Youth career
- –2015: Kaizer Chiefs
- –2018: Polokwane City

Senior career*
Years	Team	Apps	(Gls)
2018–2021	Polokwane City	53	(1)
2021–2022	TTM	23	(1)
2022–	Venda	11	(0)
- * Club domestic league appearances and goals as of 11 November 2022

Nicholas Motloung (born 5 September 1995) is a South African soccer player who plays as a defender for National First Division club Venda. He played youth football for Kaizer Chiefs but was released by the club in 2015.
