= The Bees F.C. =

Football club in the South African National First Division

The Bees
- Full name: The Bees Football Club
- League: National First Division
- 2025–26: 10th
- Website: www.facebook.com/p/The-Bees-FC-61563592402751/

The Bees is a South African soccer club, based in Nkomati, Mpumalanga, that plays in the National First Division.

== History ==
After finishing eleventh in the Mpumalanga Stream of the 2023–24 SAFA Second Division, the club followed it up by winning the stream in 2024–25 to qualify for the national playoffs. The Bees progressed to the final, losing to Gomora United, and earned promotion to the 2025–26 National First Division.

After a poor start to the 2025–26 National First Division season, with the club in 13th position, coach Humphrey Mlwane was relieved of his position in November 2025. The club recovered to finish tenth.

The Bees also began the 2026–27 National First Division poorly, starting with four straight defeats. Coach Duncan Lechesa was dismissed in September 2026, three months after his appointment.

== Honours ==
- SAFA Second Division Mpumalanga Stream winners: 2024–25

== League record ==
=== SAFA Second Division Mpumalanga Stream ===
- 2023–24 – 11th
- 2024–25 – 1st

=== National First Division ===
- 2025–26 – 10th
