= Tiklas Thutlwa =

South African soccer player

Personal information
- Full name: Tiklas Ntshilo Thutlwa
- Date of birth: 9 May 1999 (age 27)
- Position: Striker

Team information
- Current team: Venda (on loan from Sekhukhune United)

Youth career
- Black Leopards

Senior career*
Years	Team	Apps	(Gls)
2020–2023	Black Leopards	74	(26)
2023–	Sekhukhune United	7	(0)
2024–	→ Venda (loan)	0	(0)
- * Club domestic league appearances and goals as of 20 March 2024

Tiklas Thutlwa (born 9 May 1999) is a South African soccer player who plays as a forward for Sekhukhune United in the Premier Soccer League.

== Career ==
Thutlwa made his debut in the 2019-20 South African Premier Division on 16 August 2020. He first came into the spotlight when scoring both goals in a 2–1 victory over Kaizer Chiefs in May 2021. Nonetheless, his club Black Leopards were relegated in 2021. The Sowetan called him "one of the few players who deserved to remain in the top-flight". Thutlwa subsequently became the top goalscorer of the 2021-22 National First Division with 16 goals. After that he desired a move to the first tier again.

Such a move did not materialize, but after the Black Leopards were relegated from the 2022-23 National First Division, Thutlwa became a free agent. He was wanted by Sekhukhune United, and the move went through in July 2023 among over half a dozen other new signings.

In March 2023, he collapsed on the field during a match, but his condition was not critical.

Thutlwa was loaned out to Venda F.C. in January 2024, after less than one season at Sekhukhune United. After only a few days, he broke his leg during a friendly match. He was promptly sent to a public hospital, where he claimed he remained untreated, and that he was surprised the club did not arrange for a stay in a private hospital. Said Thutlwa, "I don’t know why I’m here. I’m surprised because I want to get back to the field and this is delaying me".

== International career ==
Thutlwa was a part of South Africa's squad for the 2021 COSAFA Cup, albeit without playing.

He was named in the preliminary squad for the 2023 COSAFA Cup, and again made the final squad.

== Personal life ==
He is nicknamed "Castro".
