= Ubuntu Cape Town F.C. =

Ubuntu Cape Town FC
- Founded: 2017
- Ground: Athlone Stadium
- Capacity: 34,000
- Manager: Casey Prince
- League: ABC Motsepe League
- 2024–25: 9th (Stream A)
- Website: www.ubuntufootball.com

Ubuntu Cape Town FC is a South African football club in the city of Cape Town. As of 2024–25, the club plays in the Western Cape Stream of the SAFA Second Division.

The club was created when the Ubuntu Football Trust purchased the franchise license of FC Cape Town in 2017.

== League record ==
=== National First Division ===
- 2017–18 – 14th
- 2018–19 – 15th (relegated)

=== SAFA Second Division (Western Cape) ===
- 2019–20 – 13th
- 2020–21 – 5th
- 2021–22 – 3rd (Stream A)
- 2022–23 – 2nd (Stream B)
- 2023–24 – 6th (Stream A)
- 2024–25 – 9th (Stream B)
- 2025–26 – 9th (Stream A)
