= Jacksa Spears F.C. =

South African soccer club

Jacksa Spears
- Founded: 2008
- Ground: Northern Cape Agricultural School
- League: SAFA Second Division
- 2024–25: 4th (SAFA Second Division, Northern Cape Stream C)

Jacksa Spears is a South African soccer club from Jan Kempdorp in the Northern Cape that plays in the SAFA Second Division.

== History ==
Spears became just the fourth team from the third tier to qualify for the quarter-finals of the Nedbank Cup after defeating Vasco da Gama in the round of 16 of the 2025–26 Nedbank Cup.

== League record ==
=== SAFA Second Division Northern Cape Stream ===
- 2022–23 – 4th (Stream B)
- 2023–24 – 2nd (Stream B)
- 2024–25 – 4th (Stream C)
