= 2024–25 SAFA Second Division =

ABC Motsepe League
- Season: 2024–25
- Champions: Gomora United
- Promoted: The Bees, Midlands Wanderers

The 2024–25 SAFA Second Division (known as the ABC Motsepe League for sponsorship reasons) was the 27th season of the SAFA Second Division, the third tier for South African association football clubs, since its establishment in 1998. Due to the size of South Africa, the competition was split into nine divisions, one for each region. After the league stage of the regional competition was completed, the nine winning teams of each regional division were due to enter the playoffs.

For this season, three teams were promoted to the National First Division rather than the usual two, due to the expulsion from the league of Premiership team Royal AM.

The competition is administered by the South African Football Association.

== Eastern Cape ==
In February 2025, SAFA suspended Sinenkani's fixtures pending a disciplinary hearing. The club was accused of assaulting a match official.

=== Coastal Stream ===
Pos	Team	Pld	W	D	L	GF	GA	GD	Pts	Qualification or relegation
1	Amavarara	18	14	4	0	49	16	+33	46	Qualification for Eastern Cape final
2	Matta Milan	18	14	2	2	49	15	+34	44	
3	Buffalo City Relatives	18	7	4	7	24	26	−2	25	
4	Emi	18	7	3	8	21	23	−2	24	
5	Qqberha United	18	6	5	7	26	36	−10	23	
6	Seven Stars	18	5	6	7	20	25	−5	21	
7	Camdeboo Football Academy	18	6	2	10	17	38	−21	20	
8	Mayaya	18	5	3	10	21	31	−10	18	
9	Bush Pirates	18	5	2	11	20	27	−7	17	
10	Peace Makers	18	4	3	11	15	25	−10	15	

Source: https://inqaku.com/leagues/view?season_id=12441&stream_id=18625

=== Inland Stream ===
Pos	Team	Pld	W	D	L	GF	GA	GD	Pts	Qualification or relegation
1	FC Ravens	14	12	0	2	20	6	+14	36	Qualification for Eastern Cape final
2	Sinenkani	14	11	2	1	25	4	+21	35	
3	Mighty Eagles	14	9	2	3	21	12	+9	29	
4	FC Siyanda	14	5	4	5	16	16	0	19	
5	Amaxesibe	14	4	2	8	8	18	−10	14	
6	G-millionaires	14	3	4	7	12	20	−8	13	
7	Bush Bucks	14	3	2	9	9	18	−9	11	
8	Young Challengers	14	0	2	12	7	24	−17	2	

Source: https://inqaku.com/leagues/view?season_id=12441&stream_id=18626

=== Eastern Cape final ===
FC Ravens	4–0	Amavarara	Rhodes University, Makhanda

FC Ravens won the final and were due to play in the national playoffs. However, due to ongoing legal cases challenging the outcome, SAFA went ahead without an Eastern Cape representative.

== Free State ==
In January 2025, Bloemfontein Celtic withdrew from the league, intending to purchase their way back to the Premiership.

=== Group 1A ===
Pos	Team	Pld	W	D	L	GF	GA	GD	Pts	Qualification or relegation
1	African Warriors	16	11	4	1	26	9	+17	37	Qualification for Free State final
2	D'General	16	10	3	3	34	15	+19	33	
3	Mangaung Unite	16	7	6	3	23	13	+10	27	
4	Mathathai	16	9	0	7	29	25	+4	27	
5	Free State United	16	6	4	6	17	24	−7	22	
6	Mountain Eagles	16	5	3	8	20	32	−12	18	
7	Central University	16	5	2	9	19	21	−2	17	
8	Super Eagles	16	5	2	9	13	19	−6	17	
9	Dynamos	16	2	0	14	9	32	−23	6	

Source: https://inqaku.com/leagues/view?season_id=12439&stream_id=19428

=== Group 1B ===
Pos	Team	Pld	W	D	L	GF	GA	GD	Pts	Qualification or relegation
1	Mangaung City	12	9	1	2	21	4	+17	28	Qualification for Free State final
2	Remember Elite Soccer Academy	12	6	4	2	18	10	+8	22	
3	Kovsies	12	7	0	5	20	16	+4	21	
4	Bloemfontein Young Tigers	12	5	2	5	15	13	+2	17	
5	Sibanye Golden Stars	12	5	2	5	22	24	−2	17	
6	Motsomotle	12	5	1	6	18	16	+2	16	
7	Bloemfontein Celtic	0	0	0	0	0	0	0	0	
8	Dikgosi	0	0	0	0	0	0	0	0	
9	Mathabeng Real Hearts	12	0	0	12	8	39	−31	0	

Source: https://inqaku.com/leagues/view?season_id=12439&stream_id=19429

=== Free State final ===
African Warriors	1–0	Mangaung City

African Warriors defeated Mangaung City FC 1-0 to qualify for the national playoffs.

== Gauteng ==
Highlands Park finished top of the log. However, in May 2025 they were deducted three points for fielding Nigerian player Chigamezu Franklin Ogbonna, who used fraudulent study and work visas in South Africa while playing for the club. In June 2025, SAFA ruled that the club were to be docked points for each game that Ogbonna played, leading to a 62 point deduction. Highlands Park therefore finished bottom of the log, and were relegated to the SAFA Ekurhuleni Regional League.

SAFA Second Division
- Season: 2024–25
- Matches: 69
- Goals: 151 (2.19 per match)

=== League table ===
Pos	Team	Pld	W	D	L	GF	GA	GD	Pts	Qualification or relegation
1	Highlands Park	34	26	5	3	63	22	+41	83	
2	Gomora United	34	22	8	4	46	14	+32	74	Qualification for national playoffs
3	La Masia	34	20	7	7	47	24	+23	67	
4	African All Stars	34	19	9	6	53	24	+29	66	
5	Tembisa Hollywood Thunder	34	16	8	10	48	33	+15	56	
6	Pele Pele	34	14	8	12	44	33	+11	50	
7	Eersterust Rams	34	13	10	11	40	38	+2	49	
8	University of Johannesburg	34	13	9	12	35	26	+9	48	
9	Wits University	34	11	8	15	35	36	−1	41	
10	Free Agents	34	12	5	17	26	35	−9	41	
11	Tshwane South College	34	11	6	17	34	47	−13	39	
12	Mike-1 Stars	34	10	9	15	30	50	−20	39	
13	Dube Continental	34	10	8	16	39	47	−8	38	
14	Jomo Cosmos	34	8	12	14	28	37	−9	36	
15	M Tigers	34	8	10	16	36	56	−20	34	
16	JBM	34	8	6	20	35	53	−18	30	
17	Soweto Super United	34	7	8	19	28	53	−25	29	Relegation to the SAFA Regional League
18	Opopo	34	7	6	21	40	79	−39	27	Relegation to the SAFA Regional League

Source: https://inqaku.com/leagues/view?season_id=12440&stream_id=18620

== KwaZulu-Natal ==
=== Stream A ===
Pos	Team	Pld	W	D	L	GF	GA	GD	Pts	Qualification or relegation
1	Midlands Wanderers	18	11	6	1	28	9	+19	39	Qualification for KwaZulu-Natal final
2	Umvoti	18	10	6	2	18	12	+6	36	
3	Njampela	18	8	5	5	19	11	+8	29	
4	Summerfield Dynamos	18	6	8	4	20	17	+3	26	
5	Durban Pioneers	18	5	5	8	18	18	0	20	
6	Mkhumbane Classic	18	5	5	8	19	27	−8	20	
7	Dlangezwa Hellenic	18	5	4	9	18	22	−4	19	
8	Ulundi United	18	5	4	9	15	20	−5	19	
9	Asande	18	5	4	9	14	27	−13	19	Relegation to the SAFA Regional League
10	Muzi King Masters	18	4	5	9	14	20	−6	17	Relegation to the SAFA Regional League

Source: https://inqaku.com/leagues/view?season_id=12438&stream_id=18895

=== Stream B ===
Pos	Team	Pld	W	D	L	GF	GA	GD	Pts	Qualification or relegation
1	Mkhambathi	18	17	1	0	44	6	+38	52	Qualification for KwaZulu-Natal final
2	Msinga United	18	10	4	4	33	19	+14	34	
3	KwaMashu Durban Knights	18	6	9	3	26	26	0	27	
4	Drakensberg	18	8	2	8	24	21	+3	26	
5	Chess	18	6	7	5	14	12	+2	25	
6	Junior Eleven	18	5	6	7	12	13	−1	21	
7	Umshwathi United	18	5	5	8	19	22	−3	20	
8	Ditlou	18	6	2	10	15	21	−6	20	
9	Ethekwini Coastal	18	5	2	11	19	28	−9	17	Relegation to the SAFA Regional League
10	Newcastle All Stars	18	1	4	13	11	49	−38	7	Relegation to the SAFA Regional League

Source: https://inqaku.com/leagues/view?season_id=12438&stream_id=18896

=== KwaZulu-Natal final ===
Midlands Wanderers defeated Mkhambathi FC 1-0 in the KwaZulu-Natal playoff final and qualify for the national playoffs.

== Limpopo ==
In March 2025, players from Musina United refused to continue the game after conceding a goal against Vondwe XI Bullets they believed to be offside.

The games between Vondiwe XI Bullets and Mpheni Home Defenders proved controversial. The first game between the two was abandoned after four minutes, after Bullets were awarded a penalty. The replay was also abandoned, in the 78th minute, with Defenders leading 1-0, after a Bullets goal was disallowed for offside. In June 2025, with both teams join top of the table on 45 points, and with only their result outstanding, the arbitrator overturned the previous decision to replay the game again, and ruled that Defenders be granted a 1-0 victory, thereby winning the league.

=== Stream A ===
Pos	Team	Pld	W	D	L	GF	GA	GD	Pts	Qualification or relegation
1	Vondwe XI Bullets	21	13	6	2	33	8	+25	45	Limpopo final
2	Mpheni Home Defenders	21	13	6	2	33	10	+23	45	
3	Munaca FC	22	12	7	3	39	10	+29	43	
4	White Vultures	22	10	11	1	25	12	+13	41	
5	Musina United	22	8	7	7	27	25	+2	31	
6	United Artists	22	5	11	6	13	19	−6	26	
7	Tzaneen United	22	7	4	11	24	32	−8	25	
8	Nkowankowa Continental	22	6	6	10	14	22	−8	24	
9	Winners Park (Bellevue Village)	22	6	6	10	20	35	−15	24	
10	Maruleng Celtic FC	22	4	7	11	12	27	−15	19	
11	Black Leopards	22	4	5	13	21	40	−19	17	
12	Thlothlokwe Golden Syrup	22	2	6	14	13	34	−21	12	

Updated to match(es) played on 6 June 2025. Source: https://inqaku.com/leagues/view?season_id=12435&stream_id=18508

=== Stream B ===
Pos	Team	Pld	W	D	L	GF	GA	GD	Pts	Qualification or relegation
1	The Dolphins	22	16	6	0	48	9	+39	54	Limpopo final
2	Sun Rise FC	22	17	2	3	44	11	+33	53	
3	Mighty	22	13	5	4	30	17	+13	44	
4	Ditlou FC	22	11	7	4	45	22	+23	40	
5	Mohlabile United	22	9	5	8	22	29	−7	32	
6	City Motors	22	8	4	10	27	26	+1	28	
7	Royal Pirates	22	8	4	10	24	24	0	28	
8	Lebash Football Academy	22	8	4	10	20	34	−14	28	
9	Eleven Fast Tigers	22	6	3	13	18	33	−15	21	
10	Tubatse United	22	4	6	12	27	43	−16	18	
11	Mokopane PJ Stars	22	4	3	15	16	39	−23	15	
12	P&S Academy	22	3	1	18	12	46	−34	10	

Source: https://inqaku.com/leagues/view?season_id=12435&stream_id=18509

=== Limpopo final ===
The Dolphins	1–1 (5–4 p)	Mpheni Home Defenders	Old Peter Mokaba Stadium, Polokwane
	Report

The final took place despite Dolphin's Stream B rivals Sunrise's attempt to interdict the match. The court ordered an interdict an hour before the match was due to start. A sheriff arrived with court papers, but the teams went ahead with the match. The sheriff returned with police in an attempt to stop the match, but following negotiations between police and SAFA officials, the match went ahead.

== Mpumalanga ==
In November 2024, Appollo XI, then sitting in fourth place, pulled out of the league, citing poor officiating as the reason.

In February 2025, SAFA expelled Mpumalanga Football Academy after they missed three consecutive games.

Tiger Boys also pulled out, but then reversed their decision, claiming that 'their email was hacked'. They apologised to their players, supporters and stakeholders including sponsors.

In March 2025, Witbank Citylads decided to suspend all football operations until the end of the season, citing 'disgraceful and malicious' officiating.

A few days later, Sivutsa also did not honour their fixture.

=== League table ===
Pos	Team	Pld	W	D	L	GF	GA	GD	Pts	Qualification or relegation
1	The Bees	30	23	4	3	60	12	+48	73	Qualification for 2024-25 SAFA Second Division promotion play-offs
2	Middelburg United	30	21	7	2	68	18	+50	70	
3	Phezulu	30	18	8	4	77	28	+49	62	
4	Luthuli Brigades	30	15	6	9	44	34	+10	51	
5	Fernie Battalion	30	14	6	10	46	37	+9	48	
6	Witbank City Lads	29	14	5	10	34	28	+6	47	
7	Secunda M Stars	30	12	7	11	29	35	−6	43	
8	Sivutsa	30	11	9	10	35	43	−8	42	
9	Carolina Young Boys	30	10	11	9	37	39	−2	41	
10	Liver Brothers	30	10	9	11	36	35	+1	39	
11	Tiger Boys	30	9	3	18	20	45	−25	30	
12	Sibange Young Bucks	30	6	9	15	27	38	−11	27	
13	Junior Callies	30	6	9	15	27	50	−23	27	
14	Shimadel	30	6	8	16	29	51	−22	26	
15	White Hazy United	30	5	7	18	34	59	−25	22	
16	Phuthi	29	3	4	22	28	79	−51	13	

Source: https://inqaku.com/leagues/view?season_id=12428&stream_id=18687

== North West ==
=== League table ===
Pos	Team	Pld	W	D	L	GF	GA	GD	Pts	Qualification or relegation
1	Thames FC	36	32	2	2	84	14	+70	98	Playoffs
2	Lerumo Lions	35	28	5	2	72	17	+55	89	
3	Army Rockets FC	35	26	3	6	75	29	+46	81	
4	North West University	36	22	8	6	79	26	+53	74	
5	Mahika Champions	36	20	6	10	57	27	+30	66	
6	Stilfontein Real Hearts	36	18	7	11	54	33	+21	61	
7	Kgositlile FC	35	17	4	14	42	41	+1	55	
8	Bokone NW FC	36	16	2	18	45	53	−8	50	
9	Spain FC	35	11	10	14	50	51	−1	43	
10	NWU Tawana FC	36	11	9	16	46	47	−1	42	
11	Indomitable Lions FC	36	12	6	18	53	62	−9	42	
12	Jack All Stars	36	11	5	20	41	53	−12	38	
13	NW Signal	36	11	5	20	41	70	−29	38	
14	Platinum City Rovers	35	11	2	22	39	68	−29	35	
15	Thaba Tshwane THA	35	9	7	19	39	56	−17	34	
16	Montshioa Swallows FC	35	9	7	19	42	69	−27	34	
17	Real Movers	36	10	3	23	47	85	−38	33	
18	Lethabong United	36	7	8	21	38	75	−37	29	
19	Homeboys United	31	5	1	25	21	89	−68	16	

Source: https://inqaku.com/leagues/view?season_id=12434&stream_id=19082

== Northern Cape ==
=== Stream A ===
Pos	Team	Pld	W	D	L	GF	GA	GD	Pts	Qualification or relegation
1	Kakamas Juventus	14	9	5	0	29	13	+16	32	Qualification for playoffs
2	Kakamas United	14	6	3	5	26	18	+8	21	
3	Olympics	14	6	3	5	26	24	+2	21	
4	Upington Tornado	14	5	4	5	21	18	+3	19	
5	Benfica	14	4	6	4	18	19	−1	18	
6	Young Ones	14	5	3	6	20	27	−7	18	
7	Kakamas Sundowns	14	4	1	9	13	20	−7	13	
8	Boca Juniors	14	2	5	7	15	29	−14	11	

Source: https://inqaku.com/leagues/view?season_id=12436&stream_id=18879

=== Stream B ===
Pos	Team	Pld	W	D	L	GF	GA	GD	Pts	Qualification or relegation
1	NC Professionals	14	9	4	1	29	10	+19	31	Qualification for playoffs
2	Tsantshabane Stars	14	8	4	2	24	10	+14	28	
3	Destiny United	14	5	6	3	18	16	+2	21	
4	Rasta Far Eagles	14	5	5	4	15	14	+1	20	
5	Pearls United	14	5	3	6	15	17	−2	18	
6	Maroding	14	5	2	7	14	17	−3	17	
7	Postmasburg	14	2	5	7	12	18	−6	11	
8	Olifantshoek Young Stars	14	2	1	11	5	30	−25	7	

Source: https://inqaku.com/leagues/view?season_id=12436&stream_id=18880

=== Stream C ===
Pos	Team	Pld	W	D	L	GF	GA	GD	Pts	Qualification or relegation
1	Kimberley Saints	14	11	2	1	29	9	+20	35	Qualification for playoffs
2	Mighty Reds	14	8	2	4	27	20	+7	26	
3	Diamond City	14	6	4	4	21	19	+2	22	
4	Jacksa Spears	14	6	2	6	20	18	+2	20	
5	United Rovers	14	6	1	7	32	32	0	19	
6	Falcon City	14	4	2	8	16	23	−7	14	
7	Blues	14	3	3	8	17	31	−14	12	
8	Mighty Moovers	14	3	2	9	22	32	−10	11	

Source: https://inqaku.com/leagues/view?season_id=12436&stream_id=18881

=== Northern Cape playoffs ===
Kakamas Juventus won the Northern Cape playoffs, defeating Kimberley Saints 1-0 and NC Professionals 2-1 to qualify for the national playoffs.

== Western Cape ==
=== Stream A ===
Pos	Team	Pld	W	D	L	GF	GA	GD	Pts	Qualification or relegation
1	Zizwe United	22	16	4	2	45	16	+29	52	Qualification for Western Cape playoff
2	Vasco da Gama	22	15	5	2	46	20	+26	50	
3	Crystal Palace	22	11	7	4	35	28	+7	40	
4	Junction Rovers	22	10	4	8	50	32	+18	34	
5	Grassy Park United	22	10	2	10	30	29	+1	32	
6	Hout Bay United	22	9	4	9	42	24	+18	31	
7	FN Rangers	22	7	8	7	36	30	+6	29	
8	City Kings	22	7	7	8	25	29	−4	28	
9	Ubuntu Football Club	22	8	2	12	36	31	+5	26	
10	Young Bafana	22	6	7	9	39	36	+3	25	
11	Cape Town Spurs Youth	22	5	4	13	27	31	−4	19	
12	Diaz Leeds	22	1	0	21	26	131	−105	3	

Source: https://inqaku.com/leagues/view?season_id=12437&stream_id=18988

=== Stream B ===
Pos	Team	Pld	W	D	L	GF	GA	GD	Pts	Qualification or relegation
1	Hanover Park	22	15	5	2	63	18	+45	50	Qualification for Western Cape playoff
2	Santos	22	11	7	4	41	24	+17	40	
3	Royal Blues	22	12	3	7	35	24	+11	39	
4	Oriented Birds	22	10	6	6	41	31	+10	36	
5	Ammar Soccer Academy	22	10	4	8	33	27	+6	34	
6	Maties F.C.	22	9	5	8	34	27	+7	32	
7	Mbekweni Cosmos	22	8	7	7	30	35	−5	31	
8	Seaside Spurs	22	8	5	9	32	31	+1	29	
9	Ubuntu Spartans	22	7	3	12	32	45	−13	24	
10	Barcelona	22	7	3	12	22	43	−21	24	
11	Salim United	22	5	3	14	15	38	−23	18	
12	Infantry School	22	1	7	14	17	52	−35	10	

Source: https://inqaku.com/leagues/view?season_id=12437&stream_id=18989

=== Western Cape final ===
In the first final, Hanover Park defeated Zizwe United FC 4-2 on penalties, after a 1-1 draw.

However, Zizwe won an arbitration case against SAFA, necessitating a replay of the match. Zizwe won the replay to qualify for the national playoffs.

7 May 2025	Hanover Park	1–1 (4–2 p)	Zizwe United	Cloetesville Sports Ground, Stellenbosch
		Report

29 June 2025	Hanover Park	1–2	Zizwe United	Ocean View Sports Field, Ocean View

== Playoffs ==
The playoffs commenced on 1 July 2025, in spite of outstanding cases affecting the representatives from Limpopo and the Eastern Cape.

SAFA eventually reduced the playoffs to seven teams, excluding the teams from the affected provinces.

They were further marred by controversy when matchday three was postponed due to lack of water, followed by a dispute over the representative from Group A. With both Zizwe and Midlands Wanderers finishing on one point, and one goal each, SAFA initially ruled that Zizwe would qualify due to a better disciplinary record. Following a dispute and arbitration, the match between them was ordered to be replayed, with Midlands winning 4-0.

The following teams qualified for the playoffs from their respective provincial streams.

=== Group A ===
- Zizwe United (Western Cape)
- Midlands Wanderers (KwaZulu-Natal)
- The Bees (Mpumalanga)

==== Results ====
1 July 2025	Zizwe United	1–1	Midlands Wanderers	Giant Stadium, Soshanguve

2 July 2025	The Bees	1–0	Midlands Wanderers	Giant Stadium, Soshanguve

4 July 2025	The Bees	1–0	Zizwe United	Lucas Moripe Stadium, Atteridgeville

5 July 2025	Midlands Wanderers	4–0	Zizwe United	Lucas Moripe Stadium, Atteridgeville

=== Group B ===
- African Warriors (Free State)
- Gomora United (Gauteng)
- Eastern Cape representative (excluded)

==== Results ====
2 July 2025	Gomora United	3–0	African Warriors	Giant Stadium, Soshanguve

=== Group C ===
- Kakamas Juventus (Northern Cape)
- Thames FC (North West)
- Limpopo representative (excluded)

==== Results ====
1 July 2025	Thames FC	2–1	Kakamas Juventus	Giant Stadium, Soshanguve

=== Semi-finals ===
5 July 2025	The Bees	0–0 (4–2 p)	Thames FC

5 July 2025	Gomora United	1–0	Midlands Wanderers

=== Third-fourth playoff ===
6 July 2025	Midlands Wanderers	2–1	Thames FC

=== Final ===
6 July 2025	Gomora United	2–0	The Bees	Lucas Moripe Stadium, Atteridgeville
