= Leicesterford City F.C. =

Football club in the South African National First Division

Leicesterford City
- Founded: 2025
- Ground: Kameelrivier Stadium
- Owner: Lister Makatoane
- League: National First Division
- 2025–26: 12th

Leicesterford City F.C. is a South African soccer club from Mpumalanga that plays in the National First Division.

== History ==
The club was founded in 2025 following owner Lister Makatoane's purchase of JDR Stars. Makatoane was previously a director at JDR Stars.

Prior to the start of the season, the club alleged that Premiership club TS Galaxy had illegally procured some of its players.

The club failed to pay salaries in November 2025, and as of 22 December, December salaries were still unpaid.

Makatoane is from Limpopo, and the club moved its home base to the Mafori Stadium in Lebowakgomo prior to the start of the 2026–27 season. Leicesterford previously played home matches at the Kameelrivier Stadium and the Lucas Moripe Stadium in Atteridgeville.

== League record ==
=== National First Division ===
- 2025–26 – 12th
