= Cape Town City F.C. =

Cape Town City F.C. might refer to:

- Cape Town City F.C. (NFL)
- Cape Town City F.C. (2016)
