= Veluyeke Zulu =

South African soccer player

Personal information
- Date of birth: 2 March 1995 (age 31)
- Place of birth: Ulundi, South Africa
- Height: 1.90 m (6 ft 3 in)
- Position: Defender

Team information
- Current team: TS Galaxy
- Number: 45

Youth career
- 2014–2016: Maritzburg United
- 2015: → Royal Eagles (loan)
- 2016–2017: Golden Arrows

Senior career*
Years	Team	Apps	(Gls)
2017–2021	Richards Bay	68	(0)
2021–2022	Chippa United	26	(2)
2022–2024	AmaZulu	15	(1)
2025–	TS Galaxy	3	(0)
- * Club domestic league appearances and goals as of 4 January 2026

Veluyeke Zulu (born 2 March 1995) is a South African soccer player who plays for TS Galaxy in the Premier Soccer League.

Zulu came from Ulundi and attended Nomzimana High School. At the age of 16, he went on trial for the Nike's The Chance talent programme, but was not selected. He later went on trial with Maritzburg United, and was able to join the youth system there. He also spent time on loan with the Royal Eagles. After the coach who had selected him, Mandla Ncikazi, went from Maritzburg United to Golden Arrows, Zulu followed.

Undisclosed problems kept Zulu from performing well at Golden Arrows, postponing a possible breakthrough. Zulu was persuaded by Richards Bay chairman; Jomo Biyela, to join that club, playing in the second tier. His national breakthrough there came when Richards Bay eliminated Kaizer Chiefs in the 2020–21 Nedbank Cup.

Zulu was later on signed by Chippa United, conveying that the chance of playing under Gavin Hunt was an important factor in the transfer. For his new club, Zulu won man-of-the-match awards in back-to-back at the onset of the 2021-22 South African Premier Division. However, Hunt was sacked shortly into the season.

Transfer rumours surrounded Zulu, including rumours about the big 3 South African clubs. He ended up signing for AmaZulu in a major squad overhaul for that club, with 15 players being released and 10 signed. Zulu was named in the preliminary South Africa squad for the 2023 COSAFA Cup.

Zulu was released by AmaZulu in 2024. He was first on trial with Baroka, and was offered a contract as well, but backed out to join Marumo Gallants instead. However, that deal "failed to materialize", and Zulu remained without a club for the latter half of 2024. He did train with TS Galaxy towards the end of 2024.
