= Leruma United F.C. =

Football club in the South African National First Division

Leruma United

Leruma United is a South African soccer club based in Daveyton, Gauteng.

== History ==
The club played for many years in the Gauteng Stream of the SAFA Second Division before purchasing the National First Division status of Marumo Gallants prior to the start of the 2024–25 National First Division.

Leruma was relegated in its first season, finishing bottom of the log.

== League record ==
=== SAFA Second Division Gauteng Stream ===
- 2015–16 – 13th
- 2016–17 – 10th
- 2017–18 – 15th
- 2018–19 – 13th
- 2019–20 – 13th
- 2020–21 – 2nd (Stream A)
- 2021–22 – 7th (Stream B)
- 2022–23 – 17th

=== National First Division ===
- 2024–25 – 16th (relegated)

=== SAFA Second Division Gauteng Stream ===
- 2025–26 – 18th (relegated)
