= Giant Stadium =

Stadium in Soshanguve, South Africa

Soshanguve Giant Stadium
- Interactive map of Soshanguve Giant Stadium
- Location: Soshanguve Highway, Soshanguve, Pretoria, Gauteng, South Africa
- Coordinates: 25°31′00″S 28°5′17″E
- Owner: Tshwane Metropolitan Municipality
- Capacity: 18,000
- Surface: Grass

Construction
- Renovated: 2009

Tenants
- JDR Stars F.C. Soshanguve Sunshine

Soshanguve Giant Stadium, commonly referred to as Giant, is a multi-purpose stadium located in Soshanguve, a township of Pretoria, South Africa. It was utilized as a training field for teams participating in the 2010 FIFA World Cup after being rebuilt and upgraded in 2009 to meet FIFA specifications. Besides serving as a training venue for the World Cup, it was also used as a public viewing area for residents to watch matches.

Currently the stadium is the home for JDR Stars F.C. and Soshanguve Sunshine F.C., playing in the North West Province of Vodacom League. However, the stadium is situated a few kilometers within the border of the Gauteng province.

Giant Stadium was initially intended to become a surrounding fully built stadium by Y+K Architects as the planning and preliminary design of the stadium entailed the design of the full approximately 45,000 seater capacity stadium

However, construction was initially halted then ended, with only the western pavilion being finally constructed, along with VVIP, VIP, player and full media facilities.
