= 2023–24 SAFA Second Division =

SAFA Second Division
- Season: 2023–24
- Champions: Highbury F.C.
- Promoted: Kruger United

The 2023–24 SAFA Second Division (known as the ABC Motsepe League for sponsorship reasons) was the 26th season of the SAFA Second Division, the third tier for South African association football clubs, since its establishment in 1998. Due to the size of South Africa, the competition was split into nine divisions, one for each region. After the league stage of the regional competition is completed, the nine winning teams of each regional division entered the playoffs.

Highbury F.C. from the Eastern Cape, and Kruger United from Mpumalanga qualified for the final, with both earning promotion to the 2024–25 National First Division.

Highbury F.C. defeated Kruger United 2-0 in the final, with Highbury taking R1.2 million in prize money, and Kruger United R600,000.

The competition is administered by the South African Football Association.

In January 2024, a game in the Limpopo A stream between Madridtas FC and Vondwe XI Bullets in Tshifudi outside Thohoyandou resulted in a referee being attacked.

In May 2024, three officials were suspended for soliciting bribes.

== Regions ==
=== Eastern Cape ===
Newly promoted teams:

- EMI
- Ayliff City

==== Stream A ====
Pos	Team	Pld	W	D	L	GF	GA	GD	Pts	Qualification or relegation
1	Sinenkani	16	14	2	0	47	11	+36	44	Playoffs
2	FC Ravens	16	13	3	0	40	7	+33	42	
3	Amavarara	16	9	1	6	30	22	+8	28	
4	FC Buffalo City Relatives	16	5	3	8	22	32	−10	18	
5	Peace Makers FC	16	4	4	8	17	28	−11	16	
6	Bush Bucks	16	3	5	8	15	28	−13	14	
7	Young Challengers FC	16	3	4	9	11	27	−16	13	
8	Camdeboo Football Academy Development	16	3	4	9	17	40	−23	13	
9	Hanley FC	16	2	6	8	15	19	−4	12	

Source: https://inqaku.com/leagues/view?season_id=10147&stream_id=13591

==== Stream B ====
Pos	Team	Pld	W	D	L	GF	GA	GD	Pts	Qualification or relegation
1	Highbury FC	16	13	2	1	44	9	+35	41	Playoffs
2	Matta Milan	16	9	1	6	24	14	+10	28	
3	AmaMpondo United	16	7	4	5	19	16	+3	25	
4	FC Siyanda	16	7	4	5	20	21	−1	25	
5	Ayliff City FC	16	7	2	7	18	22	−4	23	
6	Emi FC	16	4	5	7	18	23	−5	17	
7	Amaxesibe FC	16	3	7	6	16	28	−12	16	
8	Bush Pirates	16	3	5	8	12	21	−9	14	
9	Seven Stars	16	3	2	11	13	30	−17	11	

Source: https://inqaku.com/leagues/view?season_id=10147&stream_id=13592

=== Free State ===
Newly promoted teams:

- Ixias
- Super Eagles

==== Stream A ====
Pos	Team	Pld	W	D	L	GF	GA	GD	Pts
1	D General FC	18	11	6	1	39	20	+19	39
2	Bloemfontein Celtic	18	11	5	2	29	11	+18	38
3	Dikgosi FC	18	10	4	4	25	19	+6	34
4	Dikwena United	18	7	5	6	27	21	+6	26
5	Sibanye Golden Stars	18	7	3	8	22	25	−3	24
6	Super Eagles	18	7	2	9	21	20	+1	23
7	Central University of FS	18	6	3	9	28	29	−1	21
8	Peace Lovers	18	6	2	10	27	36	−9	20
9	Bloemfontein Young Tigers	18	5	3	10	20	33	−13	18
10	FC Matjhabeng	18	2	3	13	19	43	−24	9

Source: https://inqaku.com/leagues/view?season_id=10156&stream_id=13749

==== Stream B ====
Pos	Team	Pld	W	D	L	GF	GA	GD	Pts	Qualification or relegation
1	Mangaung Unite	16	11	5	0	33	7	+26	38	Playoffs
2	Mathaithai	16	9	5	2	24	13	+11	32	
3	Kovsies FC	16	7	6	3	17	9	+8	27	
4	FC Spartans	16	6	5	5	17	13	+4	23	
5	African Warriors	16	5	6	5	24	22	+2	21	
6	Buffalo FC	16	4	6	6	17	20	−3	18	
7	FC Blackcross	16	4	1	11	17	27	−10	13	
8	Dynamos FC	16	3	3	10	13	37	−24	12	
9	Ixias	16	2	5	9	14	28	−14	11	

Source: https://inqaku.com/leagues/view?season_id=10156&stream_id=13750

=== Gauteng ===
Newly promoted teams:

- Mike 1 Stars
- University of Johannesburg

The division was won by Dondol Stars for the second year in a row.

Pos	Team	Pld	W	D	L	GF	GA	GD	Pts	Qualification or relegation
1	Dondol Stars	34	24	5	5	69	23	+46	77	Playoffs
2	Highlands Park	34	21	8	5	47	16	+31	71	
3	Pele Pele	34	19	10	5	54	31	+23	67	
4	Jomo Cosmos	34	20	6	8	45	18	+27	66	
5	African All Stars	34	20	6	8	54	31	+23	66	
6	Tembisa Sports Centre	34	18	9	7	45	28	+17	63	
7	Wits University	34	16	4	14	44	41	+3	52	
8	Tembisa Hollywood Thunder	34	13	10	11	52	29	+23	49	
9	M Tigers	34	12	13	9	47	36	+11	49	
10	Dube Continental	34	13	8	13	49	47	+2	47	
11	University of Johannesburg	34	12	7	15	43	38	+5	43	
12	Soweto Super United	34	10	10	14	40	39	+1	40	
13	JBM FC	34	10	7	17	38	54	−16	37	
14	Thelray United	34	10	7	17	24	41	−17	37	
15	Mike-1-Stars	34	10	7	17	40	61	−21	37	
16	Sk FC	34	5	9	20	23	52	−29	24	
17	Pretoria Ally's Tigers	34	3	6	25	27	77	−50	15	
18	Senaoane Gunners	34	3	2	29	21	100	−79	11	

Source: https://inqaku.com/leagues/view?season_id=10153&stream_id=13539

=== Kwazulu-Natal ===
Newly promoted teams:

- Dlangezwa Hellenic
- Swayimane United

The KwaZulu-Natal provincial playoffs were won by Njampela FC, who defeated uMsinga United 1-0 after extra time. The game ended 0-0 in regulation time. Their coach, Tshepo Motsoeneng, will be making his sixth appearance at the national playoffs.

==== Stream A ====
Pos	Team	Pld	W	D	L	GF	GA	GD	Pts	Qualification or relegation
1	Njampela FC	16	12	2	2	32	9	+23	38	Playoffs
2	Mkhumbane Classic	16	11	3	2	30	8	+22	36	
3	Summerfield Dynamos	16	7	6	3	30	16	+14	27	
4	Midlands Wanderers	16	6	6	4	23	19	+4	24	
5	Muzi King Masters	16	5	6	5	21	19	+2	21	
6	Hellenic FC	16	4	4	8	13	25	−12	16	
7	Asande FC	16	3	4	9	12	24	−12	13	
8	Playoffs	16	2	6	8	12	28	−16	12	
9	Stone Breakers	16	1	5	10	7	32	−25	8	

Source: https://inqaku.com/leagues/view?season_id=10145&stream_id=14158

==== Stream B ====
Pos	Team	Pld	W	D	L	GF	GA	GD	Pts	Qualification or relegation
1	Msinga United	18	13	4	1	29	7	+22	43	Playoffs
2	Mkhambathi FC	18	13	3	2	31	10	+21	42	
3	FC Drakensberg	18	12	3	3	27	10	+17	39	
4	Umvoti FC	18	9	5	4	29	14	+15	32	
5	Remax Address Friends	18	6	3	9	22	25	−3	21	
6	Chess FC	18	6	1	11	19	25	−6	19	
7	Newcastle All Stars	18	5	4	9	16	23	−7	19	
8	Ethekwini Coastal	18	5	4	9	14	29	−15	19	
9	Swayimane United	18	4	1	13	16	39	−23	13	
10	Titanic FC	18	1	4	13	17	38	−21	7	

Source: https://inqaku.com/leagues/view?season_id=10145&stream_id=14159

=== Limpopo ===
Newly promoted teams:

- Nkowankowa Continental
- Sunrise FC

==== Stream A ====
Pos	Team	Pld	W	D	L	GF	GA	GD	Pts	Qualification or relegation
1	Mpheni Home Defenders	18	10	7	1	16	5	+11	37	Playoffs
2	Emmanuel FC	18	8	7	3	18	9	+9	31	
3	Munaca FC	18	8	5	5	19	15	+4	29	
4	United Artists	18	7	7	4	15	11	+4	28	
5	Maruleng Celtic FC	18	8	3	7	18	15	+3	27	
6	Vondwe XI Bullets	18	6	7	5	21	14	+7	25	
7	Madritas FC	18	6	3	9	15	16	−1	21	
8	Winners Park (Bellevue Village)	18	6	3	9	20	28	−8	21	
9	Giyani Happy Boys	18	4	5	9	10	20	−10	17	
10	Musina United	18	1	5	12	10	29	−19	8	

Source: https://inqaku.com/leagues/view?season_id=10166&stream_id=14612

==== Stream B ====
Pos	Team	Pld	W	D	L	GF	GA	GD	Pts	Qualification or relegation
1	Tzaneen United	18	14	3	1	35	11	+24	45	Playoffs
2	Ditlou F.C.	18	8	5	5	25	19	+6	29	
3	City Motors FC	18	6	7	5	27	23	+4	25	
4	Nkowankowa Continental	18	6	7	5	18	17	+1	25	
5	Mighty F.C.	18	7	4	7	18	26	−8	25	
6	Mokopane Pj Stars FC	18	7	3	8	19	22	−3	24	
7	The Dolphins	18	5	7	6	15	13	+2	22	
8	Tubatse United	18	6	3	9	21	22	−1	21	
9	Sun Rise FC	18	6	1	11	18	29	−11	19	
10	Eleven Fast Tigers	18	4	2	12	19	33	−14	14	

Source: https://inqaku.com/leagues/view?season_id=10166&stream_id=14613

=== Mpumalanga ===
Newly promoted teams:

- Phezulu
- MP Future Stars

The franchise of Passion F.C. was purchased by Cunningmore B.

Pos	Team	Pld	W	D	L	GF	GA	GD	Pts	Qualification or relegation
1	Kruger United	28	17	8	3	42	14	+28	59	Playoffs
2	Ehlanzeni United FC	28	16	7	5	38	21	+17	55	
3	Destiny College	28	13	10	5	33	19	+14	49	
4	Phezulu FC	28	13	7	8	41	28	+13	46	
5	Middelburg United	28	11	8	9	27	23	+4	41	
6	Secunda M Stars	28	11	8	9	31	28	+3	41	
7	Witbank City Lads	28	11	6	11	35	32	+3	39	
8	Fernie Battalion FC	28	9	10	9	30	34	−4	37	
9	FC Sivutsa NPC	28	8	10	10	32	31	+1	34	
10	Mpumalanga Football Academy	28	10	3	15	31	35	−4	33	
11	The Bees	28	8	9	11	29	33	−4	33	
12	Sibange Young Bucks	28	8	7	13	32	43	−11	31	
13	Phaphama FC	28	7	8	13	28	38	−10	29	
14	Mpumalanga Future United FC	28	7	8	13	24	42	−18	29	
15	Bakoena Chiefs	28	4	5	19	17	49	−32	17	

Source: https://inqaku.com/leagues/view?season_id=10171&stream_id=13568

=== North West ===
Newly promoted teams:

- Spain
- Montshioa Swallows

==== Stream A ====
Pos	Team	Pld	W	D	L	GF	GA	GD	Pts	Qualification or relegation
1	Army Rockets FC	16	12	3	1	40	8	+32	39	Playoffs
2	Lerumo Lions	15	8	4	3	30	14	+16	28	
3	Kgositlile FC	16	9	1	6	31	24	+7	28	
4	Spain FC	15	8	2	5	21	13	+8	26	
5	Thaba Tshwane FC	16	6	4	6	19	20	−1	22	
6	TUT FC	16	5	5	6	25	25	0	20	
7	NWU Tawana FC	16	4	3	9	19	30	−11	15	
8	Black Eagles	16	3	2	11	19	29	−10	11	
9	North West Super Stars FC	16	2	4	10	12	53	−41	10	

Source: https://inqaku.com/leagues/view?season_id=10169&stream_id=14296

==== Stream B ====
Pos	Team	Pld	W	D	L	GF	GA	GD	Pts	Qualification or relegation
1	Thames FC	16	11	3	2	41	18	+23	36	Playoffs
2	Mahika Champions	16	8	5	3	27	15	+12	29	
3	Montshioa Swallows FC	16	8	5	3	30	23	+7	29	
4	North West University	15	6	5	4	21	11	+10	23	
5	Stilfontein Real Hearts	15	6	3	6	17	16	+1	21	
6	NW Signal	16	5	4	7	20	22	−2	19	
7	Indomitable Lions FC	16	5	3	8	25	27	−2	18	
8	City Rovers FC	16	3	7	6	19	27	−8	16	
9	Taung Mega Stars	16	1	1	14	16	57	−41	4	

Source: https://inqaku.com/leagues/view?season_id=10169&stream_id=14297

=== Northern Cape ===
Newly promoted teams:

- Amaleven
- Mighty Movers

==== Stream A ====
Pos	Team	Pld	W	D	L	GF	GA	GD	Pts	Qualification or relegation
1	NC Professionals	16	13	3	0	41	8	+33	42	Playoffs
2	Kakamas Juventus	16	10	5	1	33	18	+15	35	
3	Olifantshoek Sporting	16	9	3	4	26	22	+4	30	
4	Upington Tornado	16	6	3	7	27	25	+2	21	
5	Benfica FC	16	5	4	7	22	24	−2	19	
6	Kakamas Sundowns	16	4	4	8	18	22	−4	16	
7	Olympics	16	4	4	8	26	32	−6	16	
8	Amaeleven FC	16	3	3	10	25	38	−13	12	
9	Olifantshoek Young Stars	16	2	3	11	20	49	−29	9	

Source: https://inqaku.com/leagues/view?season_id=10161&stream_id=13540

==== Stream B ====
Pos	Team	Pld	W	D	L	GF	GA	GD	Pts	Qualification or relegation
1	Saints FC	16	12	3	1	39	16	+23	39	Playoffs
2	Jacksa Spears	16	11	4	1	42	13	+29	37	
3	Tsantshabane Stars FC	16	9	3	4	21	13	+8	30	
4	Postmasburg FC	16	7	1	8	16	18	−2	22	
5	United Rovers	16	5	3	8	30	34	−4	18	
6	Diamond City	16	4	5	7	18	31	−13	17	
7	Kuruman Scorpions	16	4	3	9	13	34	−21	15	
8	Mighty Moovers	16	4	1	11	26	32	−6	13	
9	Rasta Far Eagles	16	3	3	10	14	28	−14	12	

Source: https://inqaku.com/leagues/view?season_id=10161&stream_id=13541

=== Western Cape ===
Newly promoted teams:

- Junction Rovers
- Oriented Birds

==== Stream A ====
Pos	Team	Pld	W	D	L	GF	GA	GD	Pts	Qualification or relegation
1	FN Rangers	16	12	4	0	37	11	+26	40	Playoffs
2	Ikapa Sporting	16	9	3	4	27	21	+6	30	
3	Hanover Park	16	8	5	3	36	22	+14	29	
4	Santos	16	9	2	5	28	19	+9	29	
5	Junction Rovers	16	6	3	7	32	35	−3	21	
6	Ubuntu Football Club	16	6	2	8	44	32	+12	20	
7	Young Bafana	16	5	1	10	21	34	−13	16	
8	Royal Blues	16	3	3	10	17	40	−23	12	
9	Ukhanya United	16	2	1	13	13	41	−28	7	

Source: https://inqaku.com/leagues/view?season_id=10159&stream_id=14698

==== Stream B ====
Pos	Team	Pld	W	D	L	GF	GA	GD	Pts	Qualification or relegation
1	Clarewood	16	11	3	2	31	15	+16	36	Playoffs
2	Grassy Park United	16	9	4	3	30	18	+12	31	
3	Maties F.C.	16	9	1	6	22	22	0	28	
4	Oriented Birds	16	6	5	5	29	28	+1	23	
5	Hout Bay United	16	6	4	6	30	25	+5	22	
6	Zizwe United	15	4	5	6	20	19	+1	17	
7	Cape Town Spurs Youth	16	5	2	9	31	35	−4	17	
8	City Kings	16	3	5	8	13	23	−10	14	
9	Batalions FC	15	3	1	11	12	33	−21	10	

Source: https://inqaku.com/leagues/view?season_id=10159&stream_id=14699

The Western Cape playoffs were won by FN Rangers, who defeated Clarewood FC 2-0 in the final.

== Playoffs ==
=== Group A ===
- Njampela FC (KwaZulu-Natal)
- Mpheni Defenders (Limpopo)
- FN Rangers (Western Cape)

=== Group B ===
- Mangaung Unite (Free State)
- Highbury FC (Eastern Cape)
- Thames FC [North West]

=== Group C ===
- NC Professionals (Northern Cape)
- Kruger United (Mpumalanga)
- Dondol Stars (Gauteng)

=== Semi-finals ===
21 June 2024

Kruger United	1 - 0	Thames

Mxolisi Dicky Jacobs Stadium
21 June 2024

Njampela	1 - 2	Highbury

Mxolisi Dicky Jacobs Stadium

=== Final ===
23 June 2024

Highbury	2 - 0	Kruger United
	Report

Mxolisi Dicky Jacobs Stadium
