= Harry Gwala Stadium =

Stadium in Pietermaritzburg, South Africa

- Interactive map of Harry Gwala Stadium
- Location: Princess Margaret Drive, Pelham, Pietermaritzburg, Kwazulu-Natal, South Africa
- Coordinates: 29.6173878°S 30.3856409°E
- Owner: Msunduzi Municipality
- Capacity: 12,000
- Surface: Grass

Construction
- Renovated: 2009
- Architect: Erbacon Construction

Harry Gwala Stadium is a multi-use stadium in Pietermaritzburg, South Africa. It is currently used mostly for football matches. It was previously the home ground of Maritzburg United before the Msunduzi Local Municipality revoked their right to play there in 2023, and awarded it to Royal AM.

In January 2025, Royal AM's fixtures were postponed by the PSL due to the club's preservation order over unpaid taxes by its owner. Royal AM was expelled from the league in April 2025.

Midlands Wanderers was promoted to the 2025–26 National First Division and will host their games at the stadium.

In 2008 the stadium had a capacity of 10,000, but around September 2009 it was upgraded to 12,000 seats in preparation for the upcoming 2010 FIFA World Cup. The stadium was initially planned to hold 20,000 supporters, but the municipality decided that with the available funds at their disposal, the stadium would have a capacity of just 12,000.

The stadium is named after anti-apartheid activist Harry Gwala.

In October 2025, Midlands Wanderers staff were forced to cut the grass prior to a game. Msunduzi Municipality claimed the lack of maintenance was due to not having grass-cutting equipment. Wanderers considered moving to an alternative stadium before moving to the Mpumalanga Stadium.
