= Midlands Wanderers F.C. =

Football club in the South African National First Division

Midlands Wanderers
- Nickname: Abafana Bebatha
- Ground: Sugar Ray Xulu Stadium
- Coach: Vincent Myeni
- League: National First Division
- 2025–26: 14th

Midlands Wanderers is a South African soccer club from Pietermaritzburg.

== History ==
Wanderers won the 2024–25 SAFA Second Division KwaZulu-Natal Stream A, before defeating Mkhambathi in the final to enter the national playoffs.

Wanderers finished third in the playoffs, earning promotion to the 2025–26 National First Division.

Following promotion, six of the club's players were signed by Premiership team Golden Arrows.

As of September 2026, the club plays its home games at the Sugar Ray Xulu Stadium, following problems at their preferred Harry Gwala Stadium, and the backup Mpumalanga Stadium.

== Honours ==
- SAFA Second Division winners: 2024–25

== League record ==
=== SAFA Second Division KwaZulu-Natal Stream ===
- 2021–22 – 5th (Stream B)
- 2022–23 – 4th (Stream B)
- 2023–24 – 4th (Stream A)
- 2024–25 – 1st (promoted)

=== National First Division ===
- 2025–26 – 14th
