= 2024–25 National First Division =

Motsepe Foundation Championship
- Season: 2024–25
- Champions: Durban City (1st title)
- Promoted: Durban City; Orbit College
- Relegated: Leruma United; Cape Town Spurs
- Top goalscorer: Muzomuhle Khanyi (17 goals)
- Biggest home win: Venda F.C. 5-1 Baroka (1 February 2025)
- Biggest away win: Leruma United F.C. 1-4 Kruger United ( 3 November 2024)
- Highest scoring: University of Pretoria F.C. 4-3 Black Leopards (1 December 2024)

The 2024–25 National First Division (called the Motsepe Foundation Championship for sponsorship reasons) was the season from August 2024 to May 2025 of South Africa's second tier of professional soccer, the National First Division.

== Teams ==
=== Team changes ===
The following teams changes took place since the 2023–24 season.

Promoted to 2024–25 Premiership

- Magesi

Relegated from 2023–24 Premiership

- Cape Town Spurs

Promoted from 2023–24 SAFA Second Division

- Highbury
- Kruger United

Relegated from 2023–24 National First Division

- La Masia
- Platinum City Rovers

Name changes

- Maritzburg United changed their name to Durban City after moving their home location to Durban.

Purchases

- Leruma United purchased the status of Marumo Gallants, and replaced them in the division. Marumo Gallants purchased their way into the Premiership by buying the status of Moroka Swallows.

== Table ==
| Pos | Team | Pld | W | D | L | GF | GA | GD | Pts | Promotion, qualification or relegation |
|---|---|---|---|---|---|---|---|---|---|---|
| 1 | Durban City (C, P) | 30 | 17 | 7 | 6 | 44 | 23 | +21 | 58 | Promotion to 2025–26 Premiership |
| 2 | Orbit College (P) | 30 | 14 | 11 | 5 | 33 | 19 | +14 | 53 | Promotion Play-offs |
| 3 | Casric Stars | 30 | 13 | 9 | 8 | 38 | 29 | +9 | 48 | Promotion Play-offs |
| 4 | Black Leopards | 30 | 13 | 8 | 9 | 43 | 36 | +7 | 47 | |
| 5 | Kruger United | 30 | 12 | 9 | 9 | 34 | 31 | +3 | 45 | |
| 6 | Milford | 30 | 12 | 7 | 11 | 35 | 37 | −2 | 43 | |
| 7 | JDR Stars | 30 | 11 | 10 | 9 | 30 | 33 | −3 | 43 | |
| 8 | Baroka | 30 | 10 | 11 | 9 | 41 | 43 | −2 | 41 | |
| 9 | Highbury | 30 | 10 | 8 | 12 | 29 | 28 | +1 | 38 | |
| 10 | University of Pretoria | 30 | 9 | 11 | 10 | 27 | 31 | −4 | 38 | |
| 11 | Pretoria Callies | 30 | 10 | 6 | 14 | 23 | 36 | −13 | 36 | |
| 12 | Upington City | 30 | 8 | 11 | 11 | 28 | 30 | −2 | 35 | |
| 13 | Hungry Lions | 30 | 8 | 9 | 13 | 35 | 35 | 0 | 33 | |
| 14 | Venda | 30 | 7 | 10 | 13 | 30 | 34 | −4 | 31 | |
| 15 | Cape Town Spurs (R) | 30 | 6 | 12 | 12 | 24 | 30 | −6 | 30 | Relegation to 2025–26 ABC Motsepe League |
| 16 | Leruma United (R) | 30 | 6 | 9 | 15 | 20 | 39 | −19 | 27 | Relegation to 2025–26 ABC Motsepe League |

Source: National First Division
(C) Champions; (P) Promoted to PSL; (R) Relegated

== Results ==
| Home \ Away | BAR | BLP | CTS | CAS | DUC | HIG | HUL | JDR | KRU | LER | MIL | ORB | PTC | TUK | UPI | VDA |
|---|---|---|---|---|---|---|---|---|---|---|---|---|---|---|---|---|
| Baroka | — | 4–2 | 0–2 | 0–0 | 2–1 | 3–1 | 1–1 | 3–2 | 1–0 | 3–1 | 2–3 | 1–1 | 1–2 | 1–1 | 1–1 | 4–2 |
| Black Leopards | 2–2 | — | 3–0 | 0–1 | 2–1 | 2–1 | 1–1 | 2–2 | 0–0 | 2–0 | 1–1 | 1–0 | 2–0 | 2–1 | 1–1 | 1–0 |
| Cape Town Spurs | 1–1 | 1–2 | — | 1–0 | 0–1 | 2–1 | 2–1 | 0–1 | 1–1 | 1–1 | 2–2 | 0–0 | 4–0 | 0–1 | 1–1 | 1–0 |
| Casric Stars | 1–1 | 2–1 | 0–0 | — | 1–0 | 1–0 | 2–1 | 3–1 | 2–2 | 2–2 | 2–0 | 2–0 | 1–2 | 1–0 | 0–1 | 2–3 |
| Durban City | 1–0 | 3–2 | 1–0 | 2–1 | — | 1–1 | 4–2 | 5–2 | 1–0 | 3–0 | 1–2 | 0–0 | 3–0 | 0–1 | 1–0 | 1–0 |
| Highbury | 0–1 | 1–1 | 1–0 | 0–1 | 1–0 | — | 1–0 | 1–0 | 1–0 | 1–1 | 5–1 | 0–1 | 0–0 | 2–0 | 1–3 | 1–1 |
| Hungry Lions | 0–1 | 2–2 | 1–1 | 3–0 | 1–2 | 3–1 | — | 0–0 | 1–1 | 2–0 | 2–1 | 1–2 | 0–0 | 0–1 | 1–1 | 3–1 |
| JDR Stars | 3–3 | 3–1 | 0–0 | 0–2 | 0–3 | 0–0 | 1–0 | — | 0–0 | 2–1 | 2–2 | 0–2 | 1–0 | 1–0 | 1–0 | 2–1 |
| Kruger United | 2–0 | 0–3 | 1–0 | 1–1 | 1–2 | 1–0 | 1–0 | 0–0 | — | 1–0 | 1–3 | 1–1 | 1–0 | 2–0 | 2–0 | 2–2 |
| Leruma United | 0–0 | 1–0 | 2–0 | 1–0 | 0–0 | 0–0 | 2–3 | 0–3 | 1–4 | — | 1–1 | 0–1 | 0–1 | 1–1 | 0–1 | 1–2 |
| Milford | 1–2 | 0–1 | 0–0 | 0–1 | 1–2 | 2–1 | 1–0 | 1–0 | 1–2 | 3–0 | — | 1–2 | 0–2 | 2–1 | 1–0 | 1–0 |
| Orbit College | 1–0 | 0–1 | 2–0 | 2–2 | 1–1 | 0–1 | 0–2 | 0–0 | 3–0 | 0–0 | 3–0 | — | 1–0 | 1–0 | 1–1 | 0–0 |
| Pretoria Callies | 1–0 | 2–1 | 2–1 | 0–3 | 0–0 | 0–3 | 2–1 | 0–2 | 3–1 | 1–2 | 0–0 | 2–3 | — | 0–1 | 1–2 | 1–0 |
| University of Pretoria | 1–1 | 4–3 | 0–0 | 2–1 | 1–1 | 1–1 | 3–2 | 0–1 | 2–3 | 1–0 | 1–1 | 1–1 | 1–0 | — | 0–2 | 1–1 |
| Upington City | 4–1 | 0–1 | 2–2 | 2–2 | 1–3 | 1–0 | 0–1 | 0–0 | 1–3 | 0–1 | 0–1 | 1–2 | 0–0 | 0–0 | — | 1–0 |
| Venda | 5–1 | 2–0 | 2–1 | 1–1 | 0–0 | 1–2 | 0–0 | 3–0 | 1–0 | 0–1 | 0–2 | 0–2 | 1–1 | 0–0 | 1–1 | — |

Source: thenfd.co.za
Legend: Blue = home team win; Yellow = draw; Red = away team win.

== Statistics ==
=== Top scorers ===
As of 21 May 2025

| Rank | Player | Club | Goals |
|---|---|---|---|
| 1 | (South Africa) Muzomuhle Khanyi | Hungry Lions | 17 |
| 2 | (Namibia) Joslin Kamatuka | Durban City | 14 |
| 3 | (Namibia) Bethuel Muzeu | Black Leopards | 11 |
| 4 | (South Africa) Bokang Mokwena | Upington City | 11 |

== Play-offs ==
=== Table ===
| Pos | Lge | Team | Pld | W | D | L | GF | GA | GD | Pts | Qualification |
|---|---|---|---|---|---|---|---|---|---|---|---|
| 1 | NFD | Orbit College | 4 | 2 | 2 | 0 | 2 | 0 | +2 | 8 | Promoted to the 2025-26 Premiership |
| 2 | PRE | Cape Town City | 4 | 0 | 3 | 1 | 2 | 3 | −1 | 3 | |
| 3 | NFD | Casric Stars | 4 | 0 | 3 | 1 | 2 | 3 | −1 | 3 | |

Source: https://www.psl.co.za/tournament/promotion-playoffs
Rules for classification: 1) Points; 2) Goal difference; 3) Number of goals scored;

=== Results ===
| Home \ Away | CTC | CAS | ORB |
|---|---|---|---|
| Cape Town City | — | 1–1 | 0–0 |
| Casric Stars | 1–1 | — | 0–1 |
| Orbit College | 1–0 | 0–0 | — |

Source: https://www.psl.co.za/tournament/promotion-playoffs/]
Legend: Blue = home team win; Yellow = draw; Red = away team win.

== See also ==
- 2024-25 South African Premiership
