= Tebogo Potsane =

South African soccer player

Personal information
- Date of birth: 3 September 1993 (age 33)
- Place of birth: Bloemfontein, South Africa
- Position: Winger

Team information
- Current team: Siwelele F.C.
- Number: 16

Youth career
- –2017: Free State Stars

Senior career*
Years	Team	Apps	(Gls)
2017–2018	Free State Stars	18	(0)
2018–2021	Bloemfontein Celtic	55	(3)
2021–2023	Royal AM	46	(2)
2023–2026	Kaizer Chiefs	7	(0)
2026-	Siwelele F.C.	22	(3)
- * Club domestic league appearances and goals as of 30 June 2024

Tebogo Potsane (born 3 September 1993, in Bloemfontein) is a South African soccer player who plays as a winger for Siwelele FC in the Premier Soccer League.

== Club career ==
Before Potsane made his first-tier debut in the 2016-17 South African Premier Division, he was playing for Mangaung United in the lower-tier. Playing for Free State Stars, but not as a regular, he moved on to Bloemfontein Celtic in 2018. When the team licence was taken over by Royal AM in 2021, Potsane started playing for that team.

In the summer of 2023, Potsane joined one of South Africa's biggest clubs, Kaizer Chiefs. Potsane was signed for his experience, as well as to add "depth to the group of playing personnel".

He gained headlines for arriving at his new training ground in a 300,000 rand car, and for Instagram pictures with a 1.1 million rand car. In 2020, his club had to apologise for a social media video where he was jokingly "threatening to kill someone, while wearing military camouflage". The uniform was genuine and belonged to a friend.
