= Lerumo Lions F.C. =

Football club in the South African National First Division

Lerumo Lions
- Founded: 2023
- Owner: Sibongile Marokana
- League: National First Division
- 2025–26: 8th
- Website: lerumolionsfc.co.za

Lerumo Lions is a South African soccer club from Bethanie in the North West Province that plays in the National First Division.

== History ==
Founded in 2023 after Sibongile Marokana purchased Bokone NW, which she renamed Lerumo Lions, the team finished second in the North West stream of the 2024–25 SAFA Second Division before purchasing National First Division status from Pretoria Callies.

== Honours ==
- SAFA Second Division winners: 2024–25

== League record ==
=== SAFA Second Division North West Stream ===
- 2023–24 – 2nd (Stream A)
- 2024–25 – 2nd (purchased NFD status)

=== National First Division ===
- 2025–26 – 8th
