= Leletu Skelem =

South African soccer player

Personal information
- Date of birth: 12 May 1998 (age 28)
- Position: Midfielder

Senior career*
Years	Team	Apps	(Gls)
2018–2021	Stellenbosch	52	(5)
2021–2023	Maritzburg United	28	(1)

International career^{‡}
- South Africa U20
- * Club domestic league appearances and goals as of 11 January 2024 ‡ National team caps and goals as of 22:05, 15 February 2021 (UTC)

Leletu Skelem (born 12 May 1998) is a South African professional soccer player who last played for South African Premier Division side Maritzburg United as a midfielder.

== Early life ==
Skelem grew up in Mthatha, Eastern Cape. Despite showing a preference for cricket and swimming in his early childhood but chose to pursue a career in football after his father bought him a replica of the 1996 Bafana Bafana kit.

== Career ==
Having been spotted playing for South Africa at under-20 level, Skelem signed for Stellenbosch in 2018. He scored twice in 26 league games for Stellenbosch in the 2018–19 season, as the club were promoted as to the South African Premier Division as champions of the National First Division.

In August 2021, Skelem signed for Maritzburg United.

== Honours ==
Stellenbosch

- National First Division: 2018–19
