= Gomora United F.C. =

Football club in the South African National First Division

Gomora United
- Full name: Gomora United Football Club
- Founded: 2020
- Chairman: Joe Seanago
- League: National First Division
- 2025–26: 13th
- Website: gomoraunitedfc.co.za

Gomora United is a South African soccer club from Alexandra that plays in the National First Division.

== History ==
Founded in 2020, Gomora won the Gauteng Stream of the 2024–25 SAFA Second Division following a 62-point deduction for table-topping Highlands Park.

Gomora then won the playoffs to earn promotion to the 2025–26 National First Division.

Although based in Gauteng, and having played some of its home games at the TUT Stadium in Pretoria, in December 2025 the club applied to host some of its games in Limpopo's Malamulele Stadium, citing lack of resources in Gauteng.

The club played the first few games of the 2026–27 season at the Malamulele Stadium. However, the stadium was barred from hosting games for two weeks during the season due to issues with the pitch.

== Financial difficulties ==
The club was only able to pay 50% of its staff salaries in March 2026.

In October 2026, players boycotted training due to unpaid salaries.

== Honours ==
- SAFA Second Division winners: 2024–25

== League record ==
=== SAFA Second Division Gauteng Stream ===
- 2024–25 – 1st (promoted)

=== National First Division ===
- 2025–26 – 13th
