= Tashreeq Matthews =

South African soccer player

Personal information
- Date of birth: 12 September 2000 (age 26)
- Place of birth: Hanover Park, Cape Town, South Africa
- Height: 1.75 m (5 ft 9 in)
- Position: Left winger

Team information
- Current team: Mamelodi Sundowns
- Number: 17

Youth career
- –2018: Ajax Cape Town
- 2018–2020: Borussia Dortmund

Senior career*
Years	Team	Apps	(Gls)
2019–2020	Borussia Dortmund	0	(0)
2019	→ Jong Utrecht (loan)	4	(0)
2019	→ Helsingborgs IF (loan)	2	(0)
2020–2022	Varbergs BoIS	62	(8)
2022–2023	IK Sirius	46	(12)
2024–	Mamelodi Sundowns	46	(13)

International career^{‡}
2017	South Africa U20	1	(1)
2026–	South Africa	1	(0)
- * Club domestic league appearances and goals as of 3 January 2026 ‡ National team caps and goals as of 4 October 2026

Tashreeq Matthews (born 12 September 2000) is a South African football player who plays as a left winger for Mamelodi Sundowns and the South Africa national team.

== Club career ==
Matthews played his youth career at Ajax Cape Town. In November 2018, Matthews signed for Borussia Dortmund. In January 2019, Matthews signed for Utrecht on loan. He subsequently continued his career in Sweden.

=== Mamelodi Sundowns ===
In January 2024 he signed for South African Premiership side Mamelodi Sundowns. He made 80 consecutive appearances from April 2025 till October 2026 for Sundowns.

== International career ==
Matthews has represented South Africa at the under-20 level.

On 4 October 2026, Matthews made his debut for the South Africa national team in a friendly against Egypt.

== Career statistics ==
=== Club ===
As of 15 April 2019.

Club	Season	League			Cup		Continental		Other		Total	
Club	Season	Division	Apps	Goals	Apps	Goals	Apps	Goals	Apps	Goals	Apps	Goals
Borussia Dortmund	2018–19	Bundesliga	0	0	0	0	0	0	0	0	0	0
Jong Utrecht (loan)	2018–19	Eerste Divisie	3	0	0	0	–		0	0	3	0
Helsingborgs IF (loan)	2019	Allsvenskan	2	0	0	0	–		0	0	2	0
Varbergs BoIS	2020	Allsvenskan	17	3	1 (Note: Appearances in the Svenska Cupen)	1	–		0	0	18	3
Career total			21	0	1	0	0	0	0	0	23	4

== Honours ==
Mamelodi Sundowns

- CAF Champions League: 2025–26
