= Upington City F.C. =

Upington City
- Full name: Upington City Football Club
- Nickname: Bafana Ba Gucci
- Short name: Upington City
- Ground: Mxolisi Dicky Jacobs Stadium
- League: National First Division
- 2025–26: 7th of 16
- Website: www.upingtoncityfc.co.za
colours	colours

Upington City is a South African football club based in Upington in the Northern Cape. Upington won the 2022–23 ABC Motsepe League beating Orbit College 3–1 in the final, and earning promotion to the 2023–24 National First Division.

== Seasons ==
=== SAFA Second Division ===
- 2021–22 - 1st Northern Cape Stream A
- 2022–23 - winners (promoted), 1st Northern Cape Stream A

=== National First Division ===
- 2024–25 – 6th
- 2024–25 – 12th
- 2025–26 – 7th
