= Milford F.C. (South Africa) =

Football club in the South African National First Division

Milford FC
- Full name: Milford Football Club
- Nickname: Stallions
- Founded: 2012; 14 years ago
- Ground: UMhlathuze Sports Complex Stadium
- Capacity: 10 000
- Coach: Xanti Pupuma
- League: South African Premiership
- 2025–26: National First Division, 3rd of 16 (promoted via play-off)
- Website: https://milfordfc.com

Milford F.C. is a South African soccer club based in Richards Bay, KwaZulu-Natal. They currently play in the South African Premiership from 2026-27 after promotion from National First Division in 2025-26.

== History ==
Milford campaigned for many years in the KwaZulu-Natal stream of the SAFA Second Division before purchasing the National First Division status of Uthongathi prior to the start of the 2023–24 season.

After a poor start to its first season in the second tier, including losing its first four games without scoring a goal, the club sacked its coach Asanda Mvalo.

=== 2025–26 season ===
The Stallions had their best run in the 2025–26 Nedbank Cup when they defeated Mkhambathi 2–0 in the round of 16. They reached the semi-finals after defeating top flight side Sekhukhune United 3–2 via penalties after the matched ended in a 2–2 draw.

Milford achieved further success by earning promotion from the 2025–26 National First Division after winning the playoffs and play in South African Premiership for the first time in their history.

== Honours ==
- SAFA Second Division KwaZulu-Natal Stream A winners: 2014–15, 2022–23

== League record ==
=== SAFA Second Division KwaZulu-Natal Stream ===
- 2014–15 – 1st
- 2016–17 – 3rd
- 2017–18 – 2nd
- 2018–19 – 13th
- 2019–20 – 2nd
- 2020–21 – 3rd (Stream B)
- 2021–22 – 2nd (Stream A)
- 2022–23 – 1st (Stream A)

=== National First Division ===
- 2023–24 – 13th
- 2024–25 – 6th
- 2025–26 – 3rd (promoted via play-off)
