= Orbit College F.C. =

Orbit College
- Full name: Orbit College Football Club
- Nickname: Mswenko boys
- Founded: 2009; 17 years ago
- Ground: Olympia Park
- Capacity: 32,000
- Manager: Pogiso Makhoye
- League: South African Premiership
- 2025–26: 16th of 16 (relegated)
colours	colours

Orbit College is a South African football club based in the North West province. Founded in 2009, the club earned promotion to the 2025–26 South African Premiership after winning the playoffs at the end of the 2024–25 National First Division season, becoming the first club from the North West province in seven years to play in the top tier.

Orbit College had previously earned promotion to the National First Division by winning the North West Stream A of the 2022–23 SAFA Second Division, then proceeding to the playoffs, where they lost 3–1 to Upington City in the final.

== 2022–23 SAFA Second Division semi-final ==
The 2022–23 SAFA Second Division semifinal between hosts Umsinga United and Orbit College at Harry Gwala Stadium was marred by violence. Orbit College won 1–0, and at the end of the match, fans invaded the pitch, gunshots were fired, while Umsinga United's goalkeeper coach Gezani Zondi was struck on the head and needed medical attention.

== Sponsorship ==
With two games to go in the 2024–25 National First Division season, and the club chasing promotion, Orbit received a sponsorship of R1 million from the North West provincial government.

== League record ==
=== SAFA Second Division ===
- 2015–16 – 1st North West Stream
- 2021–22 – 1st North West Stream A
- 2022–23 – runners-up (promoted), 1st North West Stream A

=== National First Division ===
- 2023–24 – 9th
- 2024–25 – 2nd (promoted)

=== South African Premiership ===
- 2025–26 – 16th (relegated)
