= Kruger United F.C. =

Football club in the South African National First Division

Kruger United
- Full name: Kruger United Football Club
- Nickname: The Village Boys
- Founded: 2023; 3 years ago
- Ground: KaNyamazane Stadium
- Capacity: 15,000
- Coach: Abraham Mongoya
- League: South African Premiership
- 2025–26: National First Division, 1st of 16 (promoted)

Kruger United is a South African soccer club, based in Bushbuckridge, Mpumalanga, they play in the South African Premiership from 2026–27 after promotion from National First Division in 2025–26.

== History ==
Kruger United was formed in 2023, after purchasing the SAFA Second Division status of Caroline FC.

In its first season, it won the Mpumalanga stream in the 2023–24 SAFA Second Division, qualifying for the playoffs, reaching the final and earning promotion to the 2024–25 National First Division. Kruger was defeated 2-0 by Highbury in the final.

Kruger appointed Vusi Mkhatshwa as head coach in February 2024. Mkhatshwa earned promotion with Kruger, the second time he had done so with a side from Mpumalanga, following Mbombela United's promotion in 2014–15. He retired at the end of the season.

The club finished fifth in its first season in the National First Division, but experienced financial difficulties, with delays in paying player's salaries. As of July 2025, 80% of the players had not been paid for May, June or July.

Kruger United won the 2025–26 National First Division, earning promotion to the Premiership for the first time in their history from next season. They were coached by Abram Mongoya, who joined them in ninth position in October 2025, before leading them to the title in May 2026 with two games to spare.

== Honours ==
- SAFA Second Division Mpumalanga Stream winners: 2023–24
- National First Division winners: 2025-26

== League record ==
=== SAFA Second Division Mpumalanga Stream ===
- 2023–24 – 1st (promoted)

=== National First Division ===
- 2024–25 – 5th
- 2025–26 – 1st (champions, promoted)
