= Highbury F.C. =

Football club in the South African National First Division

Highbury FC
- Full name: Highbury Football Club
- Founded: 1990s
- Coach: Kabelo Sibiya
- League: National First Division
- 2025–26: 6th of 16

Highbury F.C. is a South African soccer club that plays in the National First Division.

== History ==
Founded in Durban in the 1990s, the club relocated to the Eastern Cape in 2012.

Highbury won the Eastern Cape stream of the 2023–24 SAFA Second Division, qualifying for the playoffs. Highbury reached the final, earning promotion to the 2024–25 National First Division. and defeated Kruger United 2–0 in the final.

== Honours ==
- SAFA Second Division winners: 2023–24

== League record ==
=== SAFA Second Division Eastern Cape Stream ===
- 2015–16 – 13th
- 2016–17 – 11th
- 2017–18 – 9th
- 2018–19 – 9th
- 2019–20 – 10th
- 2020–21 – 7th Stream A
- 2021–22 – 4th Stream A
- 2022–23 – 5th Stream A
- 2023–24 – 1st (promoted)

=== National First Division ===
- 2024–25 – 9th
- 2025–26 – 6th
