= Venda F.C. =

Venda Football Club
- Ground: Thohoyandou Stadium (Thohoyandou)
- League: National First Division
- 2025–26: 9th

Venda F.C. (previously Venda Football Academy) is a South African football club based in Venda, South Africa.

== History ==
After previously playing in the SAFA Second Division, Venda moved to the National First Division at the start of the 2021-22 season after businessman Robinson Ramaite purchased the franchise from Cape Umoya United.

The club was renamed from Venda Football Academy to Venda Football Club ahead of the 2023–24 National First Division season.

The club endured a difficult start to the 2026–27 National First Division season, earning one point from their first five games, before dismissing coach Clinton Larsen, replacing him with Kaitano Tembo.

== Seasons ==
=== SAFA Second Division ===
- 2019–20: 6th Limpopo Stream
- 2020–21: 5th Limpopo Stream A

=== National First Division ===
- 2021–22 – 5th
- 2022–23 – 11th
- 2023–24 – 12th
- 2024–25 – 14th
- 2025–26 – 9th
