= List of South African soccer club franchise sales and name changes =

In South African soccer, it is possible for clubs to purchase the licence to play in a league from another club, purchase a club in its entirety, or change names and locations, with relative ease. For this reason, clubs buying their way into the upper divisions is not uncommon.

A number of league and cup winners have been sold in this way, including Manning Rangers, Wits, Moroka Swallows, Bloemfontein Celtic and SuperSport United.

This practice has been heavily criticised, with former Premier Soccer League (PSL) Chief Executive Trevor Phillips complaining that regular name changes and license buy outs was turning the PSL into a "mumbo-jumbo" league, and multiple league winning coach Gavin Hunt also adding his voice to the criticism.

Clubs in the top-tier were sometimes bought by businessman and renamed to have the same name as a club with previous history. In May 2008, this was partially resolved when governing body FIFA stepped in to prevent clubs purchasing licenses to play in a higher league. In 2024, Thabo Nthethe called for stricter measures to regulate buying of clubs, reflecting on the demise of one of the country's best-supported clubs, Bloemfontein Celtic, after the new owner sold the Premiership franchise two years after purchasing the club.

In 2002, the league organisers opted to purchase two clubs; Free State Stars (Qwa-Qwa) and Ria Stars (Polokwane) and dissolve them to reduce fixture congestion. Each club was purchased for R8million. Free State Stars were originally known as Qwa Qwa Stars. Another club known as Free State Stars F.C. has been established since. The owner of the original Free State Stars purchased a club in the lower divisions Maholosiane and renamed it to Free State Stars.

In January 2025, the PSL faced criticism over the poor vetting of owners buying their way into the Premiership. Royal AM, who had bought their way to the Premiership at the start of the 2021–22 season, had their fixtures suspended after the South African Revenue Service issued a preservation order against the club over unpaid tax debts by owner Shauwn Mkhize, and players salaries went unpaid.

Original club	New club	Date changed	Reason for change
Khakhu Fast XI	Mapate Silver Stars	1998	
Cape Town Spurs & Seven Stars	Ajax Cape Town	1999	Result of merger after Ajax Amsterdam buy out
Qwa-Qwa Stars	Free State Stars	1999	
HP Silver Stars	Silver Stars	200x	Name was shortened, when the Highlands Park junior team stopped as a nursery team for the club.
Mapate Silver Stars	HP Silver Stars	2000	Larry Brookstone, the owner of Highlands Park, bought the majority of shares. Despite the new ownership, the club continued to play at Peter Mokaba Stadium in Polokwane.
Amazulu	Zulu Royals	2003	
Basotho Tigers	North West Tigers	2004	
University of Port Elizabeth-FCK (UPE-FCK) & Port Elizabeth Technikon	Nelson Mandela Metropolitan University-FCK (NMMU-FCK)	2004	Merger between universities.
Hellenic	Benoni Premier United	2005	
Wits University	Bidvest Wits	2006	
Pietersburg Pillars	City Pillars	2005	
Uthukela	Nathi Lions	2005	
Tembisa Classic	Maritzburg United	2005	
Dynamos	AmaZulu	2006	
Manning Rangers	Fidentia Rangers	2006	
Mabopane Young Masters	FC AK	2006	
PJ Stars	M Tigers	2007	
Silver Stars	Platinum Stars	May 2007	Royal Bafokeng Nation (RBN) entered as the club's sponsor in 2006 and relocated the team to play at Royal Bafokeng Stadium in Phokeng. Club name also changed, when RBN bought 51% of the shares in May 2007.
Vasco da Gama	FC Cape Town	2007	
Benoni Premier United	Thanda Royal Zulu	10 October 2007	
City Pillars	Mpumalanga Black Aces	2007	
Fidentia Rangers	Ikapa Sporting	2008	
Mbekweni Cosmos	Chippa United	2010	New owner's nickname was 'Chippa'.
Nathi Lions	Atlie	2011	Franchise sold and moved from Durban to Tembisa.
Bay United	Polokwane City	2012	Club moved from Port Elizabeth to Polokwane.
Sivutsa Stars	Royal Eagles	2014	
Vasco da Gama	Stellenbosch	2016	Vasco sold National First Division (NFD) franchise and a new club was formed in Stellenbosch
Palmeros	Casric F.C.	2017	FC Palmeros were renamed Casric F.C. prior to the start of the 2017–18 SAFA Second Division
Ajax Cape Town	Cape Town Spurs	2020	Ajax Amsterdam ended their association with the club, and it was renamed Cape Town Spurs
Highlands Park	TS Galaxy	2020	TS Galaxy purchased the Premiership status of Highlands Park
Bidvest Wits	Tshakhuma Tsha Madzivhandila	2020	Tshakhuma Tsha Madzivhandila purchased the Premiership status of 2016–17 Premiership winners Bidvest Wits
Tshakhuma Tsha Madzivhandila/African All Stars	Sekhukhune United	2020	The owner of African All Stars purchased the NFD status of Tshakhuma Tsha Madzivhandila, forming a new club, Sekhukhune United
Bloemfontein Celtic	Royal AM	2021	Royal AM purchased the Premiership status from Bloemfontein Celtic
Tshakhuma Tsha Madzivhandila	Marumo Gallants	2021	Marumo Gallants purchased the Premiership status from Tshakhuma Tsha Madzivhandila
Royal AM	Tshakhuma Tsha Madzivhandila	2021	Tshakhuma Tsha Madzivhandila purchased the NFD licence from Royal AM
Free State Stars	Casric Stars	2022	Free State Stars were sold and renamed Casric Stars prior to the start of the 2022–23 National First Division
Uthongathi	Milford F.C.	2022	Uthongathi's National First Division license was purchased by Milford F.C..
All Stars	Black Leopards	2022	Relegated NFD club Black Leopards purchased the status of All Stars to continue to play in the division.
Moroka Swallows	Marumo Gallants	2024	Marumo Gallants purchased the Premiership status from Moroka Swallows
Marumo Gallants	Leruma United	2024	Leruma United purchased the National First Division status of Marumo Gallants
Maritzburg United	Durban City	2024	Club moved from Pietermaritzburg to Durban.
SuperSport United	Siwelele	2025	SuperSport sold to club owned by the son of the Minister of Sport, Gayton McKenzie.
JDR Stars	Leicesterford City	2025	JDR sold to Leicesterford and moved to Mpumalanga.
Pretoria Callies	Lerumo Lions	2025	North West Province's Lerumo Lions purchased the status of Pretoria Callies.
Original club	New club	Date changed	Reason for change
