= 2025–26 Nedbank Cup =

Tournament details
- Country: South Africa
- Dates: 4 February 2026 –
- Teams: 32

Final positions
- Champions: Durban City

The 2025–26 Nedbank Cup is the 2025–26 edition of South Africa's premier knockout club football (soccer) competition, the Nedbank Cup. It is the 54th season of the competition, and 19th under its current sponsor.

The defending champions were the competition's most successful club, Kaizer Chiefs, who broke a 10 year trophy drought to win the 2024–25 edition. They were knocked out in the round of 32 by Stellenbosch.

It was won by Durban City, who defeated TS Galaxy in the final.

== Participating teams ==
=== Teams ===
After a preliminary round featuring eight games between teams from the National First Division and eight games from the SAFA Second Division, the 16 winners joined the 16 teams from the Premiership to enter the main draw.

== Round of 32 ==
4 February 2026	Mamelodi Sundowns	2–1	Gomora United	Pretoria
19:00 SAST	Shalulile 41'; Morena 61'	Report	Maoke 45+2'	Stadium: Loftus Versfeld Stadium

4 February 2026	Stellenbosch	2–1	Kaizer Chiefs	Cape Town
19:30 SAST	Jabaar 10' (pen.); Titus 22'	Report	Silva 56' (pen.)	Stadium: DHL Stadium

6 February 2026	Durban City	0–0 (3–2 p)	Chippa United	Durban
19:00 SAST				Stadium: Chatsworth Stadium

6 February 2026	Vasco da Gama	4–1	Luthuli Brigades	Athlone
19:00 SAST				Stadium: Athlone Stadium

7 February 2026	Tshakhuma Tsha Madzivhandila	1–4	Orlando Pirates	Durban
15:00 SAST	Ngobe 39'		De Jong 10' (pen.); Mbatha 17'; Maswanganyi 50'; Mbule 90'	Stadium: Moses Mabhida Stadium

7 February 2026	Highbury	0–1	Sekhukhune United	Gqeberha
15:00 SAST				Stadium: Nelson Mandela Bay Stadium

7 February 2026	Army Rockets	0–3	Casric Stars	Rustenburg
15:00 SAST				Stadium: Olympia Park Stadium

7 February 2026	FC Cardinals	2–4 (a.e.t.)	Jacksa Spears	Bethlehem
15:00 SAST				Stadium: Goble Park

7 February 2026	Upington City	0–0 (5–4 p)	Magesi	Upington
15:00 SAST				Stadium: Mxolisi Dicky Jacobs Stadium

7 February 2026	Golden Arrows	3–0	Orbit College	Umlazi
18:00 SAST				Stadium: King Zwelithini Stadium

8 February 2026	Hungry Lions	1–1 (3–5 p)	University of Pretoria	Upington
15:00 SAST				Stadium: Mxolisi Dicky Jacobs Stadium

8 February 2026	Mkhambathi	2–1	Lerumo Lions	Clermont
15:00 SAST				Stadium: Sugar Ray Xulu Stadium

8 February 2026	TS Galaxy	1–0 (a.e.t.)	Marumo Gallants	Mpumalanga
15:00 SAST				Stadium: Solomon Mahlangu Stadium

8 February 2026	Siwelele	3–3 (3–4 p)	Richards Bay	Bloemfontein
18:00 SAST		Report		Stadium: Dr. Molemela Stadium

10 February 2026	Polokwane City	1–2 (a.e.t.)	AmaZulu	Polokwane
19:00 SAST		Report		Stadium: Old Peter Mokaba Stadium

10 February 2026	SSU MI17	1–1 (3–4 p)	Milford	Soweto
19:00 SAST	Mdluli 31'	Report	Tshilo 43'	Stadium: Dobsonville Stadium

== Round of 16 ==
Milford	2–0	Mkhambathi	Richards Bay
	Report		Stadium: Richards Bay Stadium

Golden Arrows	1–0	Stellenbosch	Durban
	Report		Stadium: King Goodwill Zwelithini Stadium

University of Pretoria	0–1	Sekhukhune United	Pretoria
	Report		Stadium: Tuks Stadium

Jacksa Spears	1–0	Vasco da Gama	Upington
	Report		Stadium: Mxolisi Dicky Jacobs Stadium

TS Galaxy	2–0	Mamelodi Sundowns	KwaMhlanga
	Report		Stadium: Solomon Mahlangu Stadium

Upington City	0–0 (0–2 p)	Durban City	Upington
	Report		Stadium: Mxolisi Dicky Jacobs Stadium

Richards Bay	0–1	AmaZulu	Durban
	Report		Stadium: King Zwelithini Stadium

Orlando Pirates	0–0 (4–5 p)	Casric Stars	Soweto
	Report		Stadium: Orlando Stadium

== Quarter-finals ==
AmaZulu	1–2	Casric Stars	Durban
	Report		Stadium: Moses Mabhida Stadium

Sekhukhune United	2–2 (2–3 p)	Milford	Polokwane
	Report		Stadium: Peter Mokaba Stadium

TS Galaxy	2–0	Jacksa Spears	KwaMhlanga
	Report		Stadium: Solomon Mahlangu Stadium

Golden Arrows	1–1 (4–5 p)	Durban City	Durban
	Report		Stadium: King Zwelithini Stadium

== Semi-finals ==
4 April 2026	Durban City	1–0	Casric Stars	Durban
		Report		Stadium: Chatsworth Stadium; Referee: Masixole Bambiso

5 April 2026	TS Galaxy	1–1 (4–3 p)	Milford	KwaMhlanga
		Report		Stadium: Solomon Mahlangu Stadium; Referee: Olani Jethro Kwinda

== Final ==
2 May 2026	Durban City	2–1	TS Galaxy	Polokwane
				Stadium: Peter Mokaba Stadium; Referee: Moreki Lekwape
