= 2019–20 National First Division =

National First Division
- Season: 2019–20
- Champions: Moroka Swallows
- Promoted: Moroka Swallows
- Relegated: TS Sporting; Royal Eagles
- Matches played: 240
- Goals scored: 555 (2.31 per match)

The 2019–20 National First Division (called the GladAfrica Championship for sponsorship reasons) is the season from August 2019 to May 2020 of South Africa's second tier of professional soccer, the National First Division.

For this season, the National First Division received new sponsorship from GladAfrica, with prize money being substantially increased to R3 million for the winners, R1.5 million for the runners up and R1 million for the third-placed team.

== Teams ==
=== Stadium and Locations ===
Team	Location	Stadium	Capacity
Ajax Cape Town	Cape Town (Green Point)	Cape Town Stadium	55,000
Cape Umoya United	Cape Town (Cape Flats)	Athlone Stadium	34,000
Free State Stars	Bethlehem	Goble Park	20,000
JDR Stars	Pretoria (Soshanguve)	Giant Stadium	18,000
Jomo Cosmos	Potchefstroom	Olën Park	22,000
Mbombela United	Mbombela	KaNyamazane Stadium	15,000
Moroka Swallows	Johannesburg (Soweto)	Dobsonville Stadium	24,000
Real Kings	Durban (Clermont)	Sugar Ray Xulu Stadium	6,500
Richards Bay	Richards Bay	Richards Bay Stadium	8,000
Royal Eagles	Pietermaritzburg	Harry Gwala Stadium	12,000
Steenberg United	Cape Town (Cape Flats)	Athlone Stadium	34,000
TS Galaxy	Kameelrivier	Kameelrivier Stadium	11,000
TS Sporting	Kabokweni	Kabokweni Stadium	8,000
Tshakhuma Tsha Madzivhandila	Thohoyandou	Thohoyandou Stadium	40,000
University of Pretoria	Pretoria	Tuks Stadium	8,000
Uthongathi	Durban (KwaMashu)	Princess Magogo Stadium	12,000

== League table ==
Pos	Team	Pld	W	D	L	GF	GA	GD	Pts	Promotion, qualification or relegation
1	Moroka Swallows (Note: Prior to the start of the season, Moroka Swallows purchased the league licence from Maccabi.) (C, P)	30	17	6	7	41	27	+14	57	Promotion to 2020–21 South African Premiership
2	Ajax Cape Town	30	18	3	9	50	37	+13	57	Qualification to Promotion play-offs
3	Tshakhuma Tsha Madzivhandila	30	14	6	10	36	31	+5	48	Qualification to Promotion play-offs
4	Real Kings	30	12	11	7	42	31	+11	47	
5	Free State Stars	30	11	12	7	41	32	+9	45	
6	Uthongathi	30	10	14	6	32	26	+6	44	
7	JDR Stars	30	11	10	9	46	40	+6	43	
8	Steenberg United	30	9	12	9	35	36	−1	39	
9	University of Pretoria	30	9	11	10	37	39	−2	38	
10	TS Galaxy	30	8	12	10	29	31	−2	36	
11	Cape Umoya United	30	9	8	13	33	36	−3	35	
12	Richards Bay	30	9	8	13	28	39	−11	35	
13	Jomo Cosmos	30	8	9	13	23	35	−12	33	
14	TS Sporting (R)	30	6	14	10	26	34	−8	32	
15	Royal Eagles (R)	30	4	9	17	29	51	−22	21	Relegation to 2020–21 SAFA Second Division
16	Mbombela United	30	8	9	13	27	30	−3	9 (Note: Mbombela United were deducted 1 point after they failed to field at least two under-23 players against Jomo Cosmos on 10 November 2019 They were further docked 23 points, and relegated to the SAFA Second Division after fielding Sabelo Ndzinisa, who had initially signed for Sporting, in 23 games.)	Relegation to 2020–21 SAFA Second Division

Updated to match(es) played on 27 August 2020. Source: https://za.soccerway.com/national/south-africa/1st-division/20192020/regular-season/r52940/
Rules for classification: 1) Points; 2) Goal difference; 3) Number of goals scored;
(C) Champions; (P) Promoted; (R) Relegated

== Play-offs ==
Black Leopards defeated Ajax Cape Town 2-0 to retain their place in the Premiership.

== Season statistics ==
=== Scoring ===
==== Top scorers ====
Rank	Player	Club	Goals
1	(South Africa) Keoikantse Mosiatlhaga	Ajax Cape Town	17
2	(South Africa) Moeketsi Makhanya	JDR Stars	12
3	(South Africa) Ruzaigh Gamildien	Steenberg United	11
3	(Ghana) Daniel Gozar	Free State Stars	11
3	(Zambia) Collins Mbesuma	University of Pretoria	11
3	(South Africa) Menzi Ndwandwe	Uthongathi	11
7	(South Africa) Kamohelo Mahlatsi	University of Pretoria	10
7	(South Africa) Kagiso Malinga	Moroka Swallows	10
8	(South Africa) Decide Chauke	TS Sporting	9
8	(South Africa) Thembisani Nevhulamba	Tshakhuma Tsha Madzivhandila	9

==== Hat-tricks ====
Player	For	Against	Result	Date
(South Africa) Keoikantse Mosiatlhaga	Ajax Cape Town	TS Sporting	3-2 (A)	26 October 2019
(South Africa) Thembisani Nevhulamba	Tshakhuma Tsha Madzivhandila	Royal Eagles	3-1 (A)	2 November 2019
(South Africa) Moeketsi Makhanya	JDR Stars	Jomo Cosmos	5-1 (H)	23 November 2019
(Ghana) Daniel Gozar	Free State Stars	Uthongathi	3-1 (H)	11 January 2020

Notes

(H) – Home team
(A) – Away team

=== Discipline ===
==== Player ====
- Most yellow cards: 11
  - (South Africa) Paulus Masehe (Free State Stars)
- Most red cards: 2
  - (Ghana) Daniel Gozar (Free State Stars)

== See also ==
- 2019-20 South African Premiership
- 2019-20 Nedbank Cup
