= 2023–24 National First Division =

National First Division
- Season: 2023–24
- Champions: Magesi
- Promoted: Magesi
- Relegated: Platinum City Rovers; La Masia
- Matches: 240
- Goals: 531 (2.21 per match)
- Top goalscorer: Nxumalo (18 goals)
- Biggest home win: Casric Stars 6-1 Orbit College (02 December 2023)
- Biggest away win: La Masia 0-4 Hungry Lions (06 October 2023); Platinum City Rovers 0-4 Pretoria Callies (09 March 2024)
- Highest scoring: Casric Stars 6-1 Orbit College (2 December 2023); Milford 4-3 Casric Stars (01 May 2024)
- Longest unbeaten run: University of Pretoria (13 matches)

The 2023–24 National First Division (called the Motsepe Foundation Championship for sponsorship reasons) was the season from September 2023 to June 2024 of South Africa's second tier of professional soccer, the National First Division. Magesi gained automatic promotion to the 2024-25 Premiership with two games in hand after defeating Milford by 3 goals to 1 on 5 May 2024.

== Teams ==
=== Team changes ===
The following teams changes have taken place since the 2022–23 season.

Promoted to 2023–24 South African Premier Division

- Polokwane City
- Cape Town Spurs

Relegated from 2022–23 South African Premier Division

- Maritzburg United
- Marumo Gallants F.C.

Promoted from 2022–23 SAFA Second Division

- Orbit College
- Upington City

Relegated from 2022–23 National First Division

- Tshakhuma Tsha Madzivhandila

Purchases

- Relegated Black Leopards purchased the status of All Stars and will continue to play in the National First Division.
- Uthongathi's license was purchased by Milford F.C..

Renamed

- Venda Football Academy were renamed Venda F.C.

=== Stadiums and locations ===
Location of teams in the 2023–24 National First Division.

16 teams are competing in the season.

Team	Location	Stadium	Capacity
Baroka	Polokwane	Old Peter Mokaba Stadium	15,000
Black Leopards	Polokwane	Pietersburg Stadium	15,000
Casric Stars	KwaMhlanga	Solomon Mahlangu Stadium	
Hungry Lions	Kimberley	Griqua Park	11,000
JDR Stars	Pretoria (Soshanguve)	Giant Stadium	18,000
Magesi	Polokwane	Old Peter Mokaba Stadium	15,000
Maritzburg United	Petermaritzburg	Harry Gwala Stadium	12,000
Marumo Gallants	Polokwane	Peter Mokaba Stadium	45,500
Milford	Princess Magogo Stadium	KwaMashu	12,000
La Masia	Johannesburg	Bidvest Stadium	5,000
Orbit College	Rustenburg	Olympia Park	32,000
Platinum City	Potchefstroom	Olën Park	22,000
Pretoria Callies	Pretoria	Lucas Masterpieces Moripe Stadium	28,900
University of Pretoria	Pretoria	Tuks Stadium	8,000
Upington City	Upington		
Venda F.C.	Thohoyandou	Thohoyandou Stadium	20,000

== Table ==
As of 19 May 2024

Pos	Team	Pld	W	D	L	GF	GA	GD	Pts	Promotion, qualification or relegation
1	Magesi (C, P)	30	16	9	5	45	28	+17	57	Promotion to 2024–25 Premiership
2	University of Pretoria (Q)	30	12	13	5	30	22	+8	49	Promotion Play-offs
3	Baroka (Q)	30	12	11	7	37	28	+9	47	Promotion Play-offs
4	Maritzburg United	30	12	10	8	38	26	+12	46	
5	JDR Stars	30	12	10	8	33	30	+3	46	
6	Upington City	30	11	11	8	38	32	+6	44	
7	Casric Stars	30	11	10	9	46	39	+7	43	
8	Hungry Lions	30	11	9	10	36	32	+4	42	
9	Orbit College	30	11	6	13	30	40	−10	39	
10	Black Leopards	30	11	4	15	31	38	−7	37	
11	Marumo Gallants	30	9	9	12	30	36	−6	36	
12	Venda	30	9	8	13	27	34	−7	35	
13	Milford	30	9	7	14	33	36	−3	34	
14	Pretoria Callies	30	8	10	12	31	35	−4	34	
15	La Masia (R)	30	6	13	11	23	33	−10	31	Relegation to 2024-25 SAFA Second Division
16	Platinum City Rovers (R)	30	5	10	15	22	41	−19	25	Relegation to 2024-25 SAFA Second Division

Source: National First Division
(C) Champions; (P) Promoted to Premiership; (Q) Qualified for phase indicated; (R) Relegated

== Statistics ==
=== Top scorers ===
As of 2 Feb 2025

Rank	Player	Club	Goals
1	(South Africa) Prince Nxumalo	JDR Stars	18
2	(Namibia) Bethuel Muzeu	Black Leopards	17
3	(South Africa) Decide Chauke	Casric Stars	14

== Play-offs ==
=== Table ===
Pos	Lge	Team	Pld	W	D	L	GF	GA	GD	Pts	Qualification
1	PRE	Richards Bay (P)	4	2	2	0	6	1	+5	8	Promoted to the 2024-25 Premiership
2	NFD	University of Pretoria	4	1	2	1	3	3	0	5	
3	NFD	Baroka	4	0	2	2	1	6	−5	2	

Updated to match(es) played on 19 June 2024. Source: https://www.psl.co.za/tournament/promotion-playoffs
Rules for classification: 1) Points; 2) Goal difference; 3) Number of goals scored;
(P) Promoted

=== Results ===
Home \ Away	BAR	RBU	TUKS
Baroka	—	0–0	1–1
Richards Bay	4–0	—	1–0
University of Pretoria	1–0	1–1	—

Updated to match(es) played on 19 June 2024. Source: https://www.psl.co.za/tournament/promotion-playoffs/Flashscore]
Legend: Blue = home team win; Yellow = draw; Red = away team win.

== See also ==
- 2023-24 South African Premiership
- 2023-24 Nedbank Cup
