= 2020–21 National First Division =

National First Division
- Season: 2020–21
- Champions: Sekhukhune United
- Relegated: Bizana Pondo Chiefs
- Matches: 240
- Goals: 143 (0.6 per match)

The 2020–21 National First Division (called the GladAfrica Championship for sponsorship reasons) was the season from November 2020 to May 2021 of South Africa's second tier of professional soccer, the National First Division.

== Teams ==
16 teams competed in the season.

=== Stadium and Locations ===
Team	Location	Stadium	Capacity
Bizana Pondo Chiefs	Mhlanga	Princess Magogo Stadium	12,000
Cape Town Spurs	Cape Town (Green Point)	Cape Town Stadium	55,000
Cape Town All Stars F.C.	Cape Town	Athlone Stadium	34,000
Cape United	Cape Town (Cape Flats)	Athlone Stadium	35,000
Free State Stars	Bethlehem	Goble Park	20,000
JDR Stars	Pretoria (Soshanguve)	Giant Stadium	18,000
Jomo Cosmos	Potchefstroom	Olën Park	22,000
Polokwane City	Polokwane	Peter Mokaba Stadium	45,500
Pretoria Callies	Pretoria	Lucas Masterpieces Moripe Stadium	28,900
Real Kings	Durban	Sugar Ray Xulu Stadium	6,500
Richards Bay	Richards Bay	Richards Bay Stadium	8,000
Sekhukhune United	Johannesburg (Tembisa)	Makhulong Stadium	10,000
Steenberg United	Cape Town (Cape Flats)	Athlone Stadium	34,000
TS Sporting	Kabokweni	Kabokweni Stadium	8,000
University of Pretoria	Pretoria	Tuks Stadium	8,000
Uthongathi	Durban (KwaMashu)	Princess Magogo Stadium	12,000

== Table ==
Pos	Team	Pld	W	D	L	GF	GA	GD	Pts	Promotion, qualification or relegation
1	Sekhukhune United	30	14	11	5	41	20	+21	53	Promotion to 2021-22 Premiership
2	Royal AM	30	13	12	5	34	25	+9	51	Qualification to Promotion Play-offs
3	Richards Bay	30	13	10	7	41	27	+14	49	Qualification to Promotion Play-offs
4	TS Sporting	30	13	10	7	41	28	+13	49	
5	Free State Stars	30	12	9	9	37	32	+5	45	
6	JDR Stars	30	11	11	8	33	32	+1	44	
7	Cape Umoya United	30	10	11	9	31	24	+7	41	
8	Pretoria Callies	30	11	8	11	24	26	−2	41	
9	Jomo Cosmos	30	9	11	10	25	27	−2	38	
10	Cape Town All Stars F.C.	30	9	10	11	28	32	−4	37	
11	Uthongathi	30	9	10	11	28	33	−5	37	
12	TUKS	30	9	8	13	27	30	−3	35	
13	Polokwane City	30	8	11	11	25	30	−5	35	
14	Cape Town Spurs	30	8	9	13	22	38	−16	33	
15	Steenberg United	30	7	9	14	27	41	−14	30	Relegation to 2021-22 SAFA Second Division
16	Bizana Pondo Chiefs	30	5	8	17	24	43	−19	23	Relegation to 2021-22 SAFA Second Division

Updated to match(es) played on 23 May 2021. Source: rsssf-South Africa 2020/21

== Play-offs ==
The playoffs were won by Chippa United, who retained their place in the 2021-22 South African Premier Division. Royal AM refused to participate, instead buying their way into the top tier by purchasing the franchise of Bloemfontein Celtic.

Pos	Lge	Team	Pld	W	D	L	GF	GA	GD	Pts	Qualification
1	PRE	Chippa United (P)	2	1	1	0	3	2	+1	4	Retain their place in the 2021-22 South African Premier Division
2	NFD	Richards Bay	2	0	1	1	2	3	−1	1	
3	PRE	Royal AM	0	0	0	0	0	0	0	0	

Source: https://www.rsssf.org/tablesz/zaf2021.html#prorel
Rules for classification: 1) Points; 2) Goal difference; 3) Number of goals scored;
(P) Promoted

== See also ==
- 2020-21 South African Premier Division
- 2020-21 Nedbank Cup
