= 2022–23 National First Division =

National First Division
- Season: 2022–23
- Champions: Polokwane City
- Promoted: Cape Town Spurs
- Matches: 79
- Top goalscorer: (15 goals); Ashley Cupido (Cape Town Spurs )
- Biggest home win: JDR Stars 6-0 Magesi; 13 September 2022
- Biggest away win: Platinum City Rovers 1-4 Tshakhuma (14 September 2022)
- Highest scoring: JDR Stars 6-0 Magesi; 13 September 2022; TUKS 3-3 Black Leopards; 21 October 2022

The 2022–23 National First Division (called the Motsepe Foundation Championship for sponsorship reasons) was the season from September 2022 to June 2023 of South Africa's second tier of professional soccer, the National First Division.

Previous sponsors GladAfrica pulled out after three years of their five-year deal, and were replaced by Patrice Motsepe, with the competition being renamed the Motsepe Foundation Championship.

== Teams ==
=== Team changes ===
The following teams changed division since the 2021–22 season.

Promoted to 2022–23 South African Premier Division

- Richards Bay

Relegated from 2021 to 2022 South African Premier Division

- Baroka

Promoted from 2021–22 SAFA Second Division

- MM Platinum
- Magesi

Relegated from 2021–22 National First Division

- TS Sporting
- Jomo Cosmos

Renaming

- Cape Town All Stars relocated from Cape Town to Johannesburg at the start of the season, and were renamed All Stars

==== Purchased statuses ====
- Free State Stars sold their status to Casric Stars

=== Stadiums and locations ===
Location of teams in the 2022–23 National First division.

16 teams are competing in the season.

Team	Location	Stadium	Capacity
All Stars	Brakpan	Tsakane Stadium	
Baroka	Polokwane	Old Peter Mokaba Stadium	15,000
Black Leopards	Polokwane	Pietersburg Stadium	15,000
Cape Town Spurs	Cape Town	Athlone Stadium	34,000
Casric Stars	KwaMhlanga	Solomon Mahlangu Stadium	
Hungry Lions	Kathu	Sivos Training Centre Stadium	1,500
JDR Stars	Pretoria (Soshanguve)	Giant Stadium	18,000
Magesi	Moletši	TT Cholo Sports Ground	15,000
MM Platinum (La Masia)	Johannesburg	Bidvest Stadium	5,000
Platinum City	Potchefstroom	Olën Park	22,000
Polokwane City	Polokwane	Pietersburg Stadium	15,000
Pretoria Callies	Pretoria	Lucas Masterpieces Moripe Stadium	28,900
Tshakhuma Tsha Madzivhandila	Thohoyandou	Thohoyandou Stadium	20,000
University of Pretoria	Pretoria	Tuks Stadium	8,000
Uthongathi	Durban (KwaMashu)	Princess Magogo Stadium	12,000
Venda Football Academy	Thohoyandou	Thohoyandou Stadium	20,000

== Table ==
As of 9 June 2023

Pos	Team	Pld	W	D	L	GF	GA	GD	Pts	Promotion, qualification or relegation
1	Polokwane City	30	17	6	7	44	24	+20	57	Promotion to 2023-24 Premiership
2	Cape Town Spurs	30	17	6	7	42	27	+15	57	Promotion Play-offs
3	Casric Stars	30	15	11	4	37	25	+12	56	Promotion Play-offs
4	All Stars	30	12	12	6	37	25	+12	48	
5	Hungry Lions	30	13	8	9	30	28	+2	47	
6	JDR Stars	30	12	9	9	40	25	+15	45	
7	Uthongathi	30	10	11	9	33	30	+3	41	
8	TUKS	30	9	13	8	32	31	+1	40	
9	Baroka	30	11	6	13	37	37	0	39	
10	Pretoria Callies	30	10	9	11	27	29	−2	39	
11	Venda FA	30	10	8	12	26	33	−7	38	
12	Magesi	30	10	7	13	22	32	−10	37	
13	La Masia	30	8	8	14	33	39	−6	32	
14	Platinum City Rovers	30	7	9	14	21	37	−16	30	
15	Tshakhuma	30	6	5	19	25	46	−21	23	Relegation to 2023-24 SAFA Second Division
16	Black Leopards	30	4	10	16	21	39	−18	22	Relegation to 2023-24 SAFA Second Division

Source: National First Division

== Results ==
Home \ Away	ALS	BAR	BLP	CTS	CAS	HUL	JDR	LAM	MAG	PLK	PCR	PCL	TTM	TUKS	UTH	VFA
All Stars	—	2–1	0–0	0–0	2–2	3–0	1–1	2–1	2–2	2–1	1–1	0–0	2–0	1–3	0–0	4–0
Baroka	0–0	—	1–0	2–3	1–2	1–0	0–1	1–1	1–1	3–1	2–1	3–1	1–2	2–1	1–2	3–1
Black Leopards	1–3	0–1	—	0–1	1–1	0–1	0–0	1–0	0–0	0–2	1–2	1–2	2–0	2–2	1–2	1–1
Cape Town Spurs	2–0	3–2	2–1	—	2–0	1–0	0–1	3–1	1–0	2–0	2–0	1–2	3–2	1–1	2–0	2–1
Casric Stars	0–0	2–1	3–1	1–0	—	2–0	2–1	1–0	0–0	1–3	2–1	2–1	2–0	1–0	1–0	1–1
Hungry Lions	1–1	1–0	0–0	1–1	0–0	—	2–1	1–0	1–2	2–1	3–2	1–1	3–0	1–1	1–0	2–0
JDR Stars	2–1	1–0	0–0	2–0	0–0	1–2	—	1–1	6–0	2–2	5–0	1–0	1–0	0–2	1–3	2–0
La Masia	1–2	4–2	2–0	1–2	2–1	2–0	2–0	—	0–1	1–2	0–0	2–1	0–0	1–1	1–1	1–0
Magesi	1–0	1–2	0–1	1–2	2–1	2–1	0–1	2–0	—	0–2	1–0	1–2	1–1	1–1	0–0	1–0
Polokwane City	2–1	0–0	3–0	0–0	0–1	2–0	2–1	2–1	1–0	—	0–0	4–0	2–1	0–0	0–1	1–0
Platinum CR	0–1	1–1	2–0	1–1	1–1	0–0	1–1	0–2	1–0	0–2	—	0–0	1–4	0–1	1–0	0–1
Pretoria Callies	0–1	1–1	2–1	1–1	1–1	0–1	1–0	2–1	2–0	0–1	0–0	—	0–0	0–1	1–2	1–0
Tshakhuma	2–2	0–1	0–1	1–0	1–1	1–2	0–5	2–0	2–0	0–2	1–2	0–1	—	1–2	1–2	2–0
TUKS	1–0	1–3	3–3	3–2	1–2	1–2	0–0	1–1	0–1	0–0	0–1	0–3	2–0	—	2–1	1–1
Uthongathi	0–2	2–0	2–2	0–1	1–2	1–0	1–1	4–4	1–0	1–1	0–1	1–1	3–0	0–0	—	1–1
Venda FA	0–1	1–0	1–0	2–1	1–1	1–1	2–1	3–0	0–1	3–2	1–0	1–0	2–1	0–0	1–1	—

Updated to match(es) played on 4 November 2022. Source: National First Division
Legend: Blue = home team win; Yellow = draw; Red = away team win.
For upcoming matches, an "a" indicates there is an article about the rivalry between the two participants.

== Statistics ==
As of 15 June 2023

Rank	Player	Club	Goals
1	(South Africa) Ashley Cupido	Cape Town Spurs	15
2	(South Africa) Kgomotso Mosadi	Casric Stars	12
2	(Zimbabwe) Ishmael Wadi	JDR Stars	12

== Play-offs ==
Pos	Lge	Team	Pld	W	D	L	GF	GA	GD	Pts	Qualification
1	NFD	Cape Town Spurs (P)	4	3	1	0	3	0	+3	10	Promoted to the 2023-24 South African Premier Division
2	PRE	Maritzburg United	4	2	1	1	4	1	+3	7	
3	NFD	Casric Stars	4	0	0	4	0	6	−6	0	

Updated to match(es) played on 13 June 2023. Source: https://thenfd.co.za/promotional-playoffs-2023-update
Rules for classification: 1) Points; 2) Goal difference; 3) Number of goals scored;
(P) Promoted

== See also ==
- 2022-23 South African Premiership
- 2022-23 Nedbank Cup
