= Cape Umoya United F.C. =

South African football club

Cape Umoya United
- Full name: Cape United Football Club
- Nickname: The Spirited Ones
- Short name: Cape Umoya
- Founded: 2018
- Ground: Athlone Stadium, Cape Town

Cape Umoya United Football Club was a South African football club based in Cape Town, South Africa. It was established in 2018 following the takeover of the defunct, former PSL team, Platinum Stars.

Platinum Stars was relegated from the 2017–2018 Premiership season, and Cape Umoya spent its three seasons in the National First Division.

The club ceased to exist after selling its franchise to Robinson Ramaite in June 2021, who moved it to Venda, forming Venda F.C.

== Seasons ==
- 2018–19 National First Division - 10th
- 2019–20 National First Division - 11th
- 2020–21 National First Division - 7th
