= Magesi F.C. =

South african football club

Magesi Football Club
- Full name: Magesi Football Club
- Nickname: Dikwena tša Meetse (Black crocodiles)
- Founded: 2011
- Ground: Seshego Stadium
- Capacity: 15,000
- Owner: Solly Makhubela
- Chairman: Solly Makhubela
- Manager: Owen Da Gama
- League: South African Premiership
- 2025–26: 15th of 16
- Website: magesi.co.za

Magesi F.C. is a soccer club located in Moletši, Kgabo Park, Limpopo, South Africa. The club was established in 2011.

== History ==
The club was originally called Tambo F.C. and won promotion from the SAB League to the ABC Motsepe League and changed name. The club was a fierce rival of Baroka during their time together at the Limpopo ABC Motsepe league along with Dolphins FC. Magesi is a regular contender in the Nedbank Cup representing the lower league from Limpopo. Their best finish was reaching the round of 16 in 2016 where they played and lost 6–0 to Bidvest Wits.

The club won the Limpopo Stream of the 2015–16 SAFA Second Division, and followed this up by winning their playoff group to earn promotion to the 2016–17 National First Division. They were relegated the following season.

They again won the Limpopo Stream of the 2021–22 SAFA Second Division and earned promotion to the 2022–23 National First Division in the playoffs, getting to the final where they lost 1–0 to MM Platinum.

Magesi won the 2023–24 National First Division, taking an unassailable eight-point lead with two games to spare.

Magesi won the 2024 Carling Knockout Cup final for the first time in the club's first season in the top flight. Magesi beat Orlando Pirates in the first round. Followed by the triumph against T.S Galaxy in the quarter-finals and then knocked out last season's semifinalists Richards Bay to reach the final. They beat Mamelodi Sundowns in the final.

In January 2025, with the club bottom of the Premiership, at least seven players received contract terminations.

The club survived the season, finishing thirteenth, but finished fifteenth in the 2025–26 South African Premiership and was relegated after finishing behind Milford in the playoffs.

== Honours ==
- National First Division: 2023–24
- SAFA Second Division: 2015–16 (Note: The league was known as the ABC Motsepe League at the time due to sponsorship reasons.)
- SAFA Second Division, Limpopo Stream: 2013–14, 2014–15, 2015–16, 2021–22
- 2024 Carling Knockout Cup

=== League record ===
==== SAFA Second Division (Limpopo Stream) ====
- 2015–16 – 1st (promoted)

==== National First Division ====
- 2016–17 – 15th (relegated)

==== SAFA Second Division (Limpopo Stream) ====
- 2017–18 – 12th
- 2018–19 – 7th
- 2019–20 – 2nd
- 2020–21 – 1st (Stream B)
- 2021–22 – 1st (Stream B, promoted)

==== National First Division ====
- 2022–23 – 12th
- 2023–24 – 1st (promoted)

==== Premiership ====
- 2024–25 – 13th
- 2025–26 – 15th (relegated)
