= Northdale Stadium =

Stadium in South Africa

- Interactive map of Northdale Stadium
- Location: Pietermaritzburg, KwaZulu-Natal
- Coordinates: 29.5664°S 30.3936°E

Northdale Stadium is a multi-use stadium in Pietermaritzburg, KwaZulu-Natal, South Africa. It is currently used mostly for football matches and is the home venue of Maritzburg City in the SAFA Second Division. It was also used as training ground for the various countries during the world cup.
