= 2016–17 SAFA Second Division =

SAFA Second Division
- Season: 2016–17
- Champions: Uthongathi
- Promoted: Uthongathi; Super Eagles

The 2016–17 SAFA Second Division (known as the ABC Motsepe League for sponsorship reasons) was the 19th season of the SAFA Second Division, the third tier league for South African association football clubs, since its establishment in 1998. Due to the size of South Africa, the competition is split into nine divisions, one for each region. After the league stage of the regional competition was completed, the nine teams are placed into two 'streams', sometimes referred to as the Inland and Coastal streams.

It was won by Uthongathi, who beat Super Eagles 1-0 in the playoff final. Both teams were promoted to the 2017-18 National First Division.

== Results ==
=== Eastern Cape ===
Pos	Team	Pld	W	D	L	GF	GA	GD	Pts	Qualification or relegation
1	EC Bees	30	23	5	2	51	16	+35	74	Playoffs
2	Future Tigers	30	23	3	4	51	21	+30	72	
3	Lions City	30	17	9	4	37	16	+21	60	
4	Mthatha City F.C.	30	15	8	7	48	31	+17	53	
5	Tornado F.C.	30	14	7	9	56	40	+16	49	
6	Callies F.C.	30	13	5	12	50	43	+7	44	
7	Matatile Professionals	30	11	8	11	43	37	+6	41	
8	Walter Sisulu University F.C.	30	12	5	13	40	40	0	41	
9	City Lads	30	10	6	14	45	52	−7	36	
10	Mdantsane Might Bucks F.C.	30	8	7	15	30	44	−14	31	
11	Highbury F.C.	30	7	9	14	40	52	−12	30	
12	Matta Milan	30	6	12	12	37	51	−14	30	
13	FC Buffalo	30	8	4	18	36	56	−20	28	
14	Swartkops Valley United Brothers	30	7	7	16	32	59	−27	28	
15	Morning Stars FC	30	6	7	17	42	59	−17	25	
16	Young Ideas FC	30	5	8	17	38	59	−21	23	

Source: https://diskizone.com/table/abc-motsepe-league-eastern-cape-20162017/

=== Free State ===
Pos	Team	Pld	W	D	L	GF	GA	GD	Pts	Qualification or relegation
1	Super Eagles	30	21	6	3	55	20	+35	69	Playoffs
2	Harmony FC	30	20	1	9	50	36	+14	61	
3	Bloemfontein Young Tigers	30	17	8	5	59	24	+35	59	
4	Bubchu United	30	18	3	9	51	34	+17	57	
5	Mangaung Unite	30	15	9	6	48	29	+19	54	
6	Sibanye Golden Stars	30	14	5	11	32	40	−8	47	
7	Dikwena United	30	13	7	10	54	40	+14	46	
8	Central University	30	12	6	12	44	32	+12	42	
9	Tshiame All Stars	30	12	5	13	40	49	−9	41	
10	Bloemfontein Celtic Development	30	11	7	12	41	33	+8	40	
11	FC Hunters	30	10	5	15	34	43	−9	35	
12	African Warriors	30	8	8	14	38	44	−6	32	
13	Free State Stars Academy	30	7	8	15	34	44	−10	29	
14	Lijabatho FC	30	6	6	18	23	57	−34	24	
15	Dia 2 FC	30	6	5	19	37	73	−36	23	
16	Dinonyana FC	30	3	5	22	28	70	−42	14	

Source: https://diskizone.com/table/abc-motsepe-league-free-state-20162017//

=== Gauteng ===
Pos	Team	Pld	W	D	L	GF	GA	GD	Pts	Qualification or relegation
1	Maccabi FC	30	19	5	6	57	36	+21	62	Playoffs
2	Orange Vaal Professionals	30	17	10	3	16	25	−9	61	
3	JDR Stars	30	18	7	5	50	25	+25	61	
4	Baberwa	30	13	10	7	37	31	+6	49	
5	Valencia FC	30	14	5	11	49	44	+5	47	
6	Alexandra Black Aces	30	12	10	8	43	32	+11	46	
7	Alexandra United	30	10	12	8	43	32	+11	42	
8	AmaBEE FC	30	10	11	9	28	31	−3	41	
9	Dondol Stars	30	10	9	11	41	36	+5	39	
10	Leruma United	30	9	9	12	31	41	−10	36	
11	African All Stars	30	9	6	15	38	40	−2	33	
12	Vaal Professionals	30	7	8	15	32	40	−8	29	
13	Garankuwa United	30	6	10	14	26	38	−12	28	
14	M Tigers	30	5	13	12	30	49	−19	28	
15	Mofolo BT Stars	30	8	3	19	39	71	−32	27	
16	Moroka Swallows	30	4	10	16	29	51	−22	22	

Source: https://diskizone.com/table/abc-motsepe-league-gauteng-20162017/

=== KwaZulu-Natal ===
Pos	Team	Pld	W	D	L	GF	GA	GD	Pts	Qualification or relegation
1	Uthongathi FC	32	23	7	2	59	12	+47	76	Playoffs
2	Umvoti	32	21	5	6	48	19	+29	68	
3	Milford FC	32	18	8	6	46	28	+18	62	
4	Happy Wanderers	32	16	8	8	67	38	+29	56	
5	Uthukela FC	32	15	7	10	38	30	+8	52	
6	KwaDukuza United	32	15	7	10	38	33	+5	52	
7	Drakensburg FC	32	15	5	12	41	40	+1	50	
8	Durban FC	32	11	7	14	51	42	+9	40	
9	GWP Friends	32	11	7	14	43	51	−8	40	
10	Sobantu Shooting Stars	32	11	6	15	29	37	−8	39	
11	Maritzburg City	32	10	7	15	37	44	−7	37	
12	Amajuba United FC	32	10	7	15	32	46	−14	37	
13	Ashley United	32	8	11	13	45	50	−5	35	
14	Matimatolo Stars	32	9	6	17	36	66	−30	33	
15	KwaMashu All Stars	32	8	5	19	40	63	−23	29	
16	Gamalakhe United	32	4	12	16	27	46	−19	24	
17	Dondotha All Stars	32	3	13	16	30	62	−32	22	

Source: https://diskizone.com/table/abc-motsepe-kzn-log-20162017/

=== Limpopo ===
Pos	Team	Pld	W	D	L	GF	GA	GD	Pts	Qualification or relegation
1	The Dolphins	30	21	7	2	63	20	+43	70	Playoffs
2	Bellevue Village Winners Park	30	21	4	5	67	19	+48	67	
3	Tshakhuma Tsha Madzivhandila	30	16	9	5	65	34	+31	57	
4	Great North F.C.	30	17	5	8	60	40	+20	56	
5	Boyne Tigers F.C.	30	15	5	10	63	36	+27	50	
6	Molemole Academy	30	14	5	11	46	44	+2	47	
7	Madridtas	30	13	7	10	43	39	+4	46	
8	Polokwane City Academy	30	11	6	13	36	35	+1	39	
9	Polokwane United	30	11	4	15	34	52	−18	37	
10	Joe Maweja FC	30	10	6	14	36	51	−15	36	
11	Gawula Classic FC.	30	9	8	13	34	54	−20	35	
12	Giyani Hotspurs	30	7	12	11	47	58	−11	33	
13	Mighty F.C.	30	9	4	17	36	61	−25	31	
14	Mokopane Ratanang	30	7	8	15	36	44	−8	29	
15	Terrors FC	30	6	6	18	32	68	−36	24	
16	Lephalale Young Killers	30	2	6	22	23	66	−43	12	

Source: https://diskizone.com/table/abc-motsepe-league-limpopo-20162017/

=== Mpumalanga ===
Pos	Team	Pld	W	D	L	GF	GA	GD	Pts	Qualification or relegation
1	Acornbush United FC	30	24	4	2	89	24	+65	76	Playoffs
2	TS Galaxy	30	18	8	4	50	21	+29	62	
3	Witbank Citylads	30	14	8	8	57	39	+18	50	
4	Phiva Young Stars	29	14	8	7	43	27	+16	50	
5	Mlambo Royal Cubs	30	13	7	10	56	39	+17	46	
6	Witbank Shepard	30	12	7	11	45	45	0	43	
7	Mapulaneng United	30	12	6	12	39	49	−10	42	
8	FC Zone Mavo	30	10	10	10	55	51	+4	40	
9	Lumoja FC	30	10	8	12	48	51	−3	38	
10	Forek Academy FC	30	11	5	14	39	46	−7	38	
11	F.C Benfica	30	10	4	16	36	71	−35	34	
12	Secunda M Stars	30	8	9	13	26	40	−14	33	
13	Mhluzi Black Rangers	30	7	11	12	36	41	−5	32	
14	Barberton City Stars	30	9	4	17	35	49	−14	31	
15	Mphakathi Academy	30	7	9	14	32	51	−19	30	
16	Premier United FC	29	3	6	20	28	70	−42	15	

Source: https://diskizone.com/table/abc-motsepe-league-mpumalanga-20162017/

=== North-West ===
Pos	Team	Pld	W	D	L	GF	GA	GD	Pts	Qualification or relegation
1	Buya Msuthu F.C.	28	23	2	3	59	16	+43	71	Playoffs
2	Polokwane City Rovers	28	21	4	3	58	19	+39	67	
3	FC Palmeros	28	17	6	5	45	21	+24	57	
4	Moretele Gunners	28	15	6	7	41	23	+18	51	
5	Orbit College	28	13	3	12	41	45	−4	42	
6	Glamour Boys	28	10	9	9	39	36	+3	39	
7	Thaba Tshwane FC	28	10	7	11	45	37	+8	37	
8	North West University	28	9	8	11	53	40	+13	35	
9	Phatsima All Stars	28	9	6	13	30	37	−7	33	
10	Ally's Tigers	28	9	5	14	30	39	−9	32	
11	Tigane Chelsea	28	8	7	13	37	55	−18	31	
12	Makapanstad Romans F.C.	28	8	6	14	32	50	−18	30	
13	Matlosana United	28	8	3	17	26	49	−23	27	
14	Platinum Stars Development	28	6	6	16	27	48	−21	24	
15	Brits Pioneers	28	3	4	21	24	72	−48	13	
16	Junior Pirates	0	0	0	0	0	0	0	0	

Source: https://diskizone.com/table/abc-motsepe-league-north-west-20162017/

=== Western Cape ===
Pos	Team	Pld	W	D	L	GF	GA	GD	Pts	Qualification or relegation
1	Zizwe United	30	22	7	1	79	19	+60	73	Playoffs
2	Steenberg United	30	21	8	1	73	21	+52	71	
3	Glendene United	30	18	6	6	53	29	+24	60	
4	The Magic	30	17	5	8	48	31	+17	56	
5	Grassy Park United	30	14	8	8	41	32	+9	50	
6	Ikapa Sporting	30	11	12	7	44	35	+9	45	
7	Ajax Cape Town Youth	30	11	9	10	42	42	0	42	
8	Barcelona F.C	30	10	7	13	46	40	+6	37	
9	Crystal Palace F.C.	30	9	9	12	53	49	+4	36	
10	United FC	30	10	5	15	46	58	−12	35	
11	Jomos Power	30	9	6	15	42	53	−11	33	
12	Atlantic Nacional	30	8	9	13	38	49	−11	33	
13	FC Cape Town Development	30	8	8	14	41	51	−10	32	
14	Milano F.C.	30	7	9	14	33	54	−21	30	
15	Cultural Roots	30	5	8	17	37	66	−29	23	
16	Devonshire Rovers	30	1	2	27	24	111	−87	5	

Source: https://diskizone.com/table/abc-motsepe-league-western-cape-20162017/
