= Wembezi Stadium =

Multi-use stadium in Estcourt, South Africa

- Interactive map of Wembezi Stadium
- Location: Estcourt, KwaZulu-Natal
- Coordinates: 29°2′53″S 29°47′16″E

Wembezi Stadium is a multi-use stadium in Estcourt, KwaZulu-Natal, South Africa. It is used mostly for football matches and is the home venue of Young Elephants Football Club in the SAFA Second Division.
