= 2015–16 SAFA Second Division =

SAFA Second Division
- Season: 2015–16
- Champions: Magesi F.C.
- Promoted: Magesi F.C.; Real Kings F.C.

The 2015–16 SAFA Second Division (known as the ABC Motsepe League for sponsorship reasons) was the 18th season of the SAFA Second Division, the third tier league for South African association football clubs, since its establishment in 1998. Due to the size of South Africa, the competition was split into nine divisions, one for each region. After the league stage of the regional competition was completed, the nine teams were placed into two 'streams', sometimes referred to as the Inland and Coastal streams.

The teams that finished in first place of the stream stage contested in the playoffs to win promotion to the National First Division as well as a substantial prize fund.

== Regions ==
=== Eastern Cape ===
Pos	Team	Pld	W	D	L	GF	GA	GD	Pts	Qualification or relegation
1	Tornado	28	21	4	3	77	20	+57	67	Playoffs
2	Lion City F.C.	28	18	4	6	50	26	+24	58	
3	Zimbane Killers F.C.	28	15	7	6	54	24	+30	52	
4	FC Elliot	28	14	9	5	46	31	+15	51	
5	EC Bees F.C.	28	13	10	5	42	30	+12	49	
6	FC Buffalo	28	13	6	9	45	32	+13	45	
7	Young Ideas F.C.	28	10	11	7	26	24	+2	41	
8	Kokstad Liverpool F.C.	28	10	6	12	35	37	−2	36	
9	Mthatha City	28	9	6	13	37	38	−1	33	
10	Matta Milan	28	9	5	14	31	53	−22	32	
11	Future Tigers F.C.	28	8	8	12	32	62	−30	32	
12	Morning Stars F.C.	28	7	4	17	28	63	−35	25	
13	Highbury F.C.	28	5	6	17	27	43	−16	21	
14	Swartkops Valley United Brothers	28	5	6	17	25	52	−27	21	
15	Emperors F.C.	28	5	4	19	39	59	−20	19	
16	Blackburn Rovers F.C. (D)	0	0	0	0	0	0	0	0	

Source: http://www.safaonline.co.za/
(D) Disqualified

=== Free State ===
Pos	Team	Pld	W	D	L	GF	GA	GD	Pts	Qualification or relegation
1	Manco Milan F.C.	28	21	2	5	58	18	+40	65	Playoffs
2	Mangaung Unite	28	18	6	4	54	31	+23	60	
3	Central University	28	17	6	5	45	22	+23	57	
4	Celtic Colts	28	15	7	6	52	26	+26	52	
5	FC Hunters	28	14	7	7	38	26	+12	49	
6	Bloemfontein Young Tigers	28	14	6	8	43	32	+11	48	
7	Dikwena United F.C.	28	13	7	8	45	38	+7	46	
8	Bubchu United	28	13	5	10	52	45	+7	44	
9	Super Eagles	28	10	7	11	42	39	+3	37	
10	Sibanye Golden Stars F.C.	28	9	10	9	28	30	−2	37	
11	FS Development Academy	28	10	4	14	42	47	−5	34	
12	Dinonyana F.C.	28	8	2	18	28	46	−18	26	
13	Harmony F.C.	28	5	6	17	34	49	−15	21	
14	Shamrock Flowers F.C.	28	3	2	23	17	77	−60	11	
15	Maluti TVET College	28	1	1	26	20	72	−52	4	
16	Bye (D)	0	0	0	0	0	0	0	0	

Source: http://www.safaonline.co.za/
(D) Disqualified

=== Gauteng ===
Pos	Team	Pld	W	D	L	GF	GA	GD	Pts	Qualification or relegation
1	JDR Stars	32	20	8	4	52	29	+23	68	Playoffs
2	AmaBEE F.C.	32	20	6	6	52	31	+21	66	
3	Alexandra United	32	18	11	3	48	20	+28	65	
4	Maccabi F.C.	32	17	7	8	56	31	+25	58	
5	African All Stars	32	18	3	11	52	30	+22	57	
6	Munsieville Stars F.C.	32	14	8	10	36	37	−1	50	
7	M Tigers	32	14	6	12	63	49	+14	48	
8	Garankuwa United	32	12	9	11	47	39	+8	45	
9	Tornado F.C.	32	12	6	14	40	41	−1	42	
10	Orange Vaal Professionals F.C.	32	11	7	14	40	46	−6	40	
11	Valencia F.C.	32	9	12	11	40	40	0	39	
12	Soweto Panthers F.C.	32	10	5	17	39	60	−21	35	
13	Leruma United	32	8	9	15	30	38	−8	33	
14	PUBS F.C.	32	8	8	16	38	54	−16	32	
15	Yebo Yes United	32	8	4	20	25	56	−31	28	
16	Diphiri F.C.	32	5	9	18	27	57	−30	24	
17	Vaal University of Technology	32	4	10	18	32	59	−27	22	

Source: https://diskizone.com/table/abc-motsepe-league-gauteng-20152016/

=== Kwazulu-Natal ===
Pos	Team	Pld	W	D	L	GF	GA	GD	Pts	Qualification or relegation
1	Real Kings F.C.	32	25	5	2	89	27	+62	80	Playoffs
2	Uthongathi F.C.	32	21	7	4	56	19	+37	70	
3	Umvoti	31	19	5	7	49	26	+23	62	
4	Natal United F.C.	32	19	2	11	56	34	+22	59	
5	Maritzburg City	32	16	3	13	45	34	+11	51	
6	Durban F.C.	31	14	6	11	60	41	+19	48	
7	Milford F.C.	30	13	7	10	42	33	+9	46	
8	Dundee Rangers	32	13	6	13	55	59	−4	45	
9	Sobantu Shooting Stars	27	12	8	7	41	34	+7	44	
10	Amajuba United F.C.	30	9	10	11	34	38	−4	37	
11	KwaMashu All Stars	30	10	6	14	34	53	−19	36	
12	Mtata Fast XI	29	9	6	14	42	46	−4	33	
13	GWP Friends	31	10	2	19	44	62	−18	32	
14	Sgcino Cosmos F.C.	32	9	3	20	47	69	−22	30	
15	Gamalakhe United	31	8	5	18	34	63	−29	29	
16	Matimatolo Stars	32	7	7	18	44	67	−23	28	
17	Wembezi Juventus	30	3	2	25	20	87	−67	11	
18	Drakensberg F.C. (D)	0	0	0	0	0	0	0	0	

Source: http://www.safaonline.co.za/
(D) Disqualified

=== Limpopo ===
Pos	Team	Pld	W	D	L	GF	GA	GD	Pts	Qualification or relegation
1	Magesi F.C.	30	28	1	1	73	15	+58	85	Playoffs
2	The Dolphins	30	22	4	4	55	21	+34	70	
3	Bellevue Village Winners Park	30	17	3	10	47	26	+21	54	
4	Boyne Tigers F.C.	30	15	6	9	57	32	+25	51	
5	Great North F.C.	30	15	4	11	55	41	+14	49	
6	Joe Express F.C.	30	15	2	13	45	36	+9	47	
7	Lephalale Young Killers	30	13	5	12	45	51	−6	44	
8	Nkowa Nkowa Barcelona F.C.	30	12	7	11	41	36	+5	43	
9	Gawula Classic F.C.	30	10	6	14	38	46	−8	36	
10	Polokwane Academy F.C.	30	10	4	16	40	41	−1	34	
11	Polokwane United	30	10	4	16	49	51	−2	34	
12	Mighty F.C.	30	10	2	18	35	61	−26	32	
13	Bilika All Stars	30	7	8	15	34	52	−18	29	
14	Giyani Hotspurs F.C.	30	8	5	17	32	58	−26	29	
15	Terrors F.C.	30	8	3	19	28	68	−40	27	
16	Mosesetjane All Stars F.C.	30	7	2	21	31	70	−39	23	

Source: http://www.safaonline.co.za/

=== Mpumalanga ===
Pos	Team	Pld	W	D	L	GF	GA	GD	Pts	Qualification or relegation
1	Appolo XI F.C.	30	20	6	4	56	26	+30	66	Playoffs
2	Acornbush United F.C.	30	19	8	3	70	25	+45	65	
3	Phiva Young Stars F.C.	30	15	7	8	54	39	+15	52	
4	Tjakastaad Junior Sheppards	30	14	9	7	53	40	+13	51	
5	Mapulaneng United F.C.	30	15	2	13	55	52	+3	47	
6	Forek Academy F.C.	30	12	8	10	52	38	+14	44	
7	TS Galaxy	30	13	5	12	51	47	+4	44	
8	Mlambo Royal Cubs F.C.	30	11	7	12	46	43	+3	40	
9	Witbank Citylads F.C.	30	11	6	13	44	43	+1	39	
10	Lumoja F.C.	30	8	14	8	29	31	−2	38	
11	Justicia Celtics F.C.	30	10	8	12	43	49	−6	38	
12	Secunda Stars F.C.	30	7	11	12	35	47	−12	32	
13	F.C Benfica	30	10	2	18	37	75	−38	32	
14	Mhluzi Black Rangers F.C.	30	7	9	14	39	60	−21	30	
15	Barberton City Stars F.C.	29	6	9	14	47	60	−13	27	
16	Godchosen F.C.	29	3	5	21	28	64	−36	14	

Source: http://www.safaonline.co.za/

=== Northern Cape ===
==== Stream A ====
Pos	Team	Pld	W	D	L	GF	GA	GD	Pts	Qualification or relegation
1	Morester Jeug	14	10	2	2	32	8	+24	32	Playoffs
2	Olympics	14	8	5	1	25	14	+11	29	
3	Mainstay United	14	7	6	1	27	14	+13	27	
4	Hungry Lions	14	5	3	6	19	24	−5	18	
5	NE Celtics	14	4	3	7	24	32	−8	15	
6	Rasta Fa Eagles	14	3	5	6	21	23	−2	14	
7	Kakamas Juventus	14	3	4	7	26	32	−6	13	
8	Kakamas Cosmos	14	0	4	10	5	32	−27	4	

Source: http://www.safaonline.co.za/

==== Stream B ====
Pos	Team	Pld	W	D	L	GF	GA	GD	Pts
1	Conville United	12	8	1	3	31	19	+12	25
2	Kuruman Kicks F.C.	12	7	1	4	28	22	+6	22
3	Juventus F.C.	12	6	3	3	20	16	+4	21
4	Young Stars F.C.	12	6	1	5	21	13	+8	19
5	Northern Cape Liverpool	12	4	3	5	23	27	−4	15
6	William Prescod A. F.C.	11	4	1	6	12	17	−5	13
7	Young Pirates	11	1	0	10	7	28	−21	3
8	Steach United (D)	0	0	0	0	0	0	0	0

Source: http://www.safaonline.co.za/
(D) Disqualified

=== North-West ===
Pos	Team	Pld	W	D	L	GF	GA	GD	Pts	Qualification or relegation
1	Orbit College	30	21	7	2	59	20	+39	70	Playoffs
2	Polokwane City Rovers	30	21	5	4	75	25	+50	68	
3	Moretele Gunners F.C.	30	20	6	4	51	22	+29	66	
4	Junior Brothers F.C.	30	17	7	6	57	34	+23	58	
5	Northwest Shining Stars F.C.	30	17	5	8	49	33	+16	56	
6	FC Palmeros	30	13	8	9	52	37	+15	47	
7	Amalia F.C.	30	12	4	14	33	51	−18	40	
8	North West University F.C.	30	11	3	16	53	54	−1	36	
9	Orkney Benfica F.C.	30	10	5	15	38	47	−9	35	
10	United Scientist F.C.	30	9	8	13	29	44	−15	35	
11	Garona F.C.	30	9	6	15	33	50	−17	33	
12	Phatsima All Stars	30	8	6	16	30	45	−15	30	
13	Platinum Stars Development	30	7	8	15	34	46	−12	29	
14	Mamusa United F.C.	30	8	5	17	32	54	−22	29	
15	Stilfontein Real Hearts	30	7	6	17	35	55	−20	27	
16	Keleku F.C.	30	3	5	22	30	73	−43	14	

Source: http://www.safaonline.co.za/

=== Western Cape ===
Pos	Team	Pld	W	D	L	GF	GA	GD	Pts	Qualification or relegation
1	Steenberg United	30	20	6	4	54	27	+27	66	Playoffs
2	Glendene United F.C.	30	19	8	3	67	28	+39	65	
3	Barcelona F.C.	30	17	7	6	57	32	+25	58	
4	Hellenic	30	16	9	5	61	28	+33	57	
5	Grassy Park United	30	15	7	8	53	36	+17	52	
6	Zizwe United	30	14	8	8	50	37	+13	50	
7	Ikapa Sporting	30	13	5	12	43	41	+2	44	
8	Milano United	30	12	7	11	40	33	+7	43	
9	The Magic	30	12	6	12	39	35	+4	42	
10	Ramblers F.C.	30	11	6	13	36	43	−7	39	
11	RC Athletico F.C.	30	9	8	13	34	36	−2	35	
12	Ajax Cape Town	30	9	5	16	37	48	−11	32	
13	Crystal Palace F.C.	30	7	8	15	29	52	−23	29	
14	Atlantic Nacional	30	5	7	18	27	55	−28	22	
15	Mitchells Plain	30	4	5	21	24	58	−34	17	
16	Black Cats	30	5	2	23	23	85	−62	17	

Source: http://www.safaonline.co.za/

== National play-offs ==
=== Group A ===
Pos	Lge	Team	Pld	W	D	L	GF	GA	GD	Pts	Promotion
1	KWZ	Real Kings F.C.	4	3	1	0	9	6	+3	10	Promoted to 2016–17 National First Division
2	WC	Steenberg United	4	3	0	1	10	4	+6	9	
3	MPU	Apollo XI F.C.	4	1	2	1	4	7	−3	5	
4	NW	Orbit College	4	1	0	3	1	4	−3	3	
5	EC	Tornado	4	0	1	3	2	5	−3	1	

Source: http://www.safaonline.co.za/
13 June 2016
12:30

Orbit College	0–1	Appolo XI F.C.

Dr Petrus Molemela Stadium
13 June 2016
15:00

Steenberg United F.C.	1–0	Tornado F.C.

Dr Petrus Molemela Stadium
14 June 2016
12:30

Appolo XI F.C.	1–1	Tornado F.C.

Dr Petrus Molemela Stadium
14 June 2016
15:00

Steenberg United F.C.	3–4	Real Kings F.C.

Dr Petrus Molemela Stadium
15 June 2016
13:00

Tornado F.C.	0–1	Orbit College

Kaizer Sebothelo Stadium
15 June 2016
15:00

Real Kings F.C.	2–2	Appolo XI F.C.

Kaizer Sebothelo Stadium
16 June 2016
13:00

Appolo XI F.C.	0–4	Steenberg United F.C.

Kaizer Sebothelo Stadium
16 June 2016
15:00

Real Kings F.C.	1–0	Orbit College

Kaizer Sebothelo Stadium
17 June 2016
12:30

Real Kings F.C.	2–1	Tornado F.C.

Kaizer Sebothelo Stadium
17 June 2016
12:30

Orbit College	0–2	Steenberg United F.C.

Dr Petrus Molemela Stadium

=== Group B ===
Pos	Lge	Team	Pld	W	D	L	GF	GA	GD	Pts	Promotion
1	LIM	Magesi F.C. (P)	3	3	0	0	7	1	+6	9	Promoted to 2016–17 National First Division
2	FS	Manco Milan F.C.	3	1	1	1	2	2	0	4	
3	GAU	JDR Stars	3	1	0	2	3	4	−1	3	
4	NC	Morester Jeug	3	0	1	2	2	7	−5	1	

Source: http://www.safaonline.co.za/
(P) Promoted
15 June 2016
09:00

Morester Jeug	0–4	Magesi F.C.

Kaizer Sebothelo Stadium
15 June 2016
11:00

Manco Milano F.C.	1–0	JDR Stars

Kaizer Sebothelo Stadium
16 June 2016
09:00

Morester Jeug	1–2	JDR Stars

Kaizer Sebothelo Stadium
16 June 2016
11:00

Manco Milano F.C.	0–1	Magesi F.C.

Kaizer Sebothelo Stadium
17 June 2016
15:00

Magesi F.C.	2–1	JDR Stars

Kaizer Sebothelo Stadium
17 June 2016
15:00

Manco Milano F.C.	1–1	Morester Jeug

Dr Petrus Molemela Stadium

== Championship ==
19 June 2016

Magesi F.C.	1–1	Kings United
	report
Penalties
	5–3

Dr Petrus Molemela Stadium

Magesi were awarded a cheque of R1 million for winning the tournament.
