= Garankuwa United F.C. =

Garankuwa United
- Full name: Garankuwa United Football Club
- Nickname: Kopano Ke Matla (Togetherness is strength)
- Founded: Revived in July 2004
- Ground: Pilditch Stadium, West Pretoria, Pretoria, Gauteng, South Africa
- Capacity: 20,000
- Owner: Dingi Rahlagane
- Chairman: Abram Rathlabane
- Manager: (South Africa) Joseph Mekoe
- League: SAFA Second Division

Garankuwa United, sometimes also spelled Ga-Rankuwa United, is a semi-professional association football club based in the Ga-Rankuwa township of Pretoria, in the Gauteng province of South Africa. The club was founded (or revived) in July 2004, to play their first season in the SAFA Regional League.

== History ==
In June 2005, the owners Dingi Rahlagane and Harold "Kaizer" Motaung, decided to acquire the Castle League franchise of the club Buffaloes, based in the North-West province of Vodacom League, which provided the team an automatic promotion to this level for 2005–06.

The team's debut season in Vodacom League was very successful, as they managed both to win the North-West province, and get promoted after the provincial play-offs, to play the next two seasons in the National First Division (NFD). By June 2007, they were however relegated back again to the North-West province of Vodacom League. They managed again to win the province, both in 2010 and 2011, but today still play in Vodacom League, as they were not yet able to also win the promotional tickets at the provincial play-offs.

The team purchased the NFD licence from United F.C. prior to the start of the 2014–15 National First Division. They were relegated that same season.

== Prehistoric team: Ga-Rankuwa United (1960–92) ==
The current Garankuwa United team, is said to have been founded in June 2005, as a phoenix team of the previous club Ga-Rankuwa United (1960–92). When the prehistoric team got founded in the early 1960s, it initially had the name ABC FC. Later it changed to Wallabies FC, before the club settled with their final name Ga-Rankuwa United. The team did not compete at the high level in South Africa, but only in various domestic regional leagues, like i.e. the Bopsol league organised by the Bophuthatswana government.

== Club records and best achievements ==
- Achieved an 11th place of the National First Division in 2006–07.
- Reached the round of sixteen in the 2007 ABSA Cup, where they were narrowly defeated 1–2 by Dynamos.
- Won the North West province of Vodacom League in 2006, 2010 and 2011.

== League results ==
=== SAFA Second Division ===
- 2005–06 – 1st (in North-West, and promoted)

=== National First Division ===
- 2006–07 – 11th
- 2007–08 – 8th (in Inland stream => Relegated)

=== SAFA Second Division ===
- 2008–09 – 4th (in North-West)
- 2009–10 – 1st (in North-West)
- 2010–11 – 1st (in North-West)

=== National First Division ===
- 2014–15 – 15th (relegated)

=== SAFA Second Division ===
- 2015–16 – 8th (Gauteng Stream)
- 2016–17 – 13th (Gauteng Stream)
- 2017–18 – 16th (Gauteng Stream, relegated)

== Stadium ==
When the team played at the National First Division in 2006–08, the preferred home venue was Odi Stadium. This venue had a capacity of 60,000 seats, and had a perfect location just 5 km North of the club house in Garankuwa, being situated in the neighbour township Mabopane. After being relegated to Vodacom League, the team however moved their home venue to these smaller and less expensive stadiums: Medunsa Stadium in 2008–09, Garankuwa Stadium in 2009–10, and Pilditch Stadium in 2010–11.
