= 2021–22 National First Division =

National First Division
- Season: 2021–22
- Champions: Richards Bay F.C.
- Relegated: TS Sporting
- Matches: 240
- Goals: 488 (2.03 per match)
- Top goalscorer: Khuda Muyaba (10 goals)
- Biggest home win: Pretoria Callies 6 - 1Cape Town Spurs (17 October 2021)
- Biggest away win: Tshakhuma Tsha Madzivhandila F.C. 0-4 Cape Town Spurs F.C. (26 September 2021))
- Highest scoring: Pretoria Callies 6-1 Cape Town Spurs (17 October 2021); Richards Bay F.C. 5-2 Platinum City F.C. (27 November 2021)
- Longest winning run: JDR Stars; Richards Bay F.C. (4 games)
- Longest unbeaten run: Richards Bay F.C. (12 games)

The 2021–22 National First Division (called the GladAfrica Championship for sponsorship reasons) was the season from 21 August 2021 to 15 May 2022 of South Africa's second tier of professional soccer, the National First Division.

== Teams ==
=== Stadiums and locations ===
Location of teams in the 2021–22 National First division.

16 teams competed in the season.

Team	Location	Stadium	Capacity
Black Leopards	Polokwane	Pietersburg Stadium	15,000
Cape Town All Stars F.C.	Stellenbosch	Idas Valley Stadium	2,500
Cape Town Spurs	Cape Town	Athlone Stadium	34,000
Free State Stars	Bethlehem	Goble Park	5,000
Hungry Lions	Kathu	Sivos Training Centre Stadium	1,500
JDR Stars	Pretoria (Soshanguve)	Giant Stadium	18,000
Jomo Cosmos	Tsakane	Tsakane Stadium	25,000
Platinum City	Potchefstroom	Olën Park	22,000
Polokwane City	Polokwane	Pietersburg Stadium	15,000
Pretoria Callies	Pretoria	Lucas Masterpieces Moripe Stadium	28,900
Richards Bay	Richards Bay	Richards Bay Stadium	8,000
Tshakhuma Tsha Madzivhandila	Thohoyandou	Thohoyandou Stadium	20,000
TS Sporting	Kabokweni	Kabokweni Stadium	8,000
University of Pretoria	Pretoria	Tuks Stadium	8,000
Uthongathi	Durban (KwaMashu)	Princess Magogo Stadium	12,000
Venda Football Academy	Thohoyandou	Thohoyandou Stadium	20,000

== Table ==
Pos	Team	Pld	W	D	L	GF	GA	GD	Pts	Promotion, qualification or relegation
1	Richards Bay	30	14	12	4	39	22	+17	54	Promotion to 2022-23 Premiership
2	TUKS	30	13	13	4	40	26	+14	52	Qualification to Promotion Play-offs
3	Cape Town All Stars	30	12	12	6	37	26	+11	48	Qualification to Promotion Play-offs
4	JDR Stars	30	12	9	9	32	28	+4	45	
5	Venda	30	10	14	6	25	24	+1	44	
6	Polokwane City	30	11	8	11	42	37	+5	41	
7	Free State Stars	30	10	11	9	26	24	+2	41	
8	Uthongathi	30	8	15	7	27	25	+2	39	
9	Black Leopards	30	10	9	11	30	29	+1	39	
10	Platinum City	30	10	8	12	30	46	−16	38	
11	Hungry Lions	30	8	12	10	27	27	0	36	
12	Pretoria Callies	30	10	5	15	33	33	0	35	
13	Tshakhuma Tsha Madzivhandila	30	9	7	14	26	45	−19	34	
14	Cape Town Spurs	30	6	15	9	27	32	−5	33	
15	Jomo Cosmos	30	5	13	12	27	34	−7	28	Relegation to 2022-23 SAFA Second Division
16	TS Sporting	30	7	7	16	22	34	−12	28	Relegation to 2022-23 SAFA Second Division

Updated to match(es) played on 15 May 2022. Source:

== Results ==
Home \ Away	BLA	CTA	CTS	FFS	HUL	JDR	JOM	PLA	PLK	PCL	RB	TSS	TTM	UNP	UTH	VEN
Black Leopards	—	1–1	2–1	0–1	0–9	0–1	2–0	2–1	1–1	1–0	1–1	0–1	2–1	0–0	0–0	1–1
Cape Town All Stars F.C.	1–0	—	1–0	1–0	1–1	0–1	2–2	1–2	2–1	0–0	0–0	3–2	5–0	1–1	3–1	3–0
Cape Town Spurs	2–0	1–1	—	1–2	1–1	1–1	1–1	0–0	1–1	1–0	1–2	2–1	1–0	2–2	0–1	0–0
Free State Stars	0–1	1–0	0–0	—	0–0	1–0	2–0	0–1	2–1	2–2	0–0	2–1	0–1	1–2	2–2	1–0
Hungry Lions	2–0	0–0	0–0	1–0	—	2–0	2–1	4–0	0–4	0–0	0–2	0–1	4–0	1–1	0–0	0–1
JDR Stars	1–0	0–1	2–3	0–0	1–0	—	3–2	1–2	2–3	0–1	1–1	2–0	2–0	1–0	1–1	1–0
Jomo Cosmos	2–0	1–1	0–0	1–1	0–0	0–1	—	2–0	3–1	1–2	0–1	1–1	0–1	0–0	1–3	2–3
Platinum City	0–5	0–1	1–0	2–2	5–1	3–2	0–0	—	2–1	0–2	1–5	0–1	2–2	0–2	1–1	0–1
Polokwane City	3–4	0–1	2–0	1–0	3–1	1–1	0–0	0–0	—	0–2	4–0	2–1	4–2	1–0	2–0	2–3
Pretoria Callies	2–0	1–2	6–1	0–1	1–2	1–2	1–2	1–2	0–1	—	1–1	1–0	2–1	1–2	1–0	1–1
Richards Bay	0–2	2–0	0–0	0–0	2–1	0–0	1–1	5–2	0–0	1–0	—	2–0	4–0	2–1	2–2	1–1
TS Sporting	1–2	1–1	0–0	0–2	2–1	1–2	0–1	0–1	0–2	1–0	1–2	—	0–0	0–0	1–1	1–1
Tshakhuma Tsha Madzivhandila	1–1	3–1	0–4	2–1	0–0	1–1	3–2	0–0	2–0	2–1	0–1	0–1	—	1–2	1–0	1–3
TUKS	1–0	3–2	4–2	3–1	0–0	1–1	1–0	4–1	2–2	1–2	1–0	2–1	0–0	—	0–0	1–0
Uthongathi	1–1	0–0	0–0	0–0	2–1	1–0	1–1	0–1	3–1	3–1	1–0	1–0	0–1	2–2	—	0–0
Venda	2–1	1–1	1–1	1–1	1–0	1–1	0–0	0–0	0–0	1–0	0–1	0–2	1–0	1–1	1–0	—

Updated to match(es) played on 20 February 2025. Source: National First Division
Legend: Blue = home team win; Yellow = draw; Red = away team win.
For upcoming matches, an "a" indicates there is an article about the rivalry between the two participants.

== Play-offs ==
Pos	Lge	Team	Pld	W	D	L	GF	GA	GD	Pts	Qualification
1	PRE	Swallows (P)	4	2	1	1	4	3	+1	7	Retain their place in the 2022-23 South African Premier Division
2	NFD	University of Pretoria F.C.	4	1	2	1	4	3	+1	5	
3	NFD	Cape Town All Stars	4	1	1	2	5	7	−2	4	

Source: https://www.rsssf.org/tablesz/zaf2022.html
Rules for classification: 1) Points; 2) Goal difference; 3) Number of goals scored;
(P) Promoted

== See also ==
- 2021-22 South African Premiership
- 2021-22 Nedbank Cup
