= Platinum City Rovers F.C. =

Platinum City Rovers FC
- Manager: Tlou Segolela
- League: SAFA Second Division
- 2023-24: 16th (relegated)
- Website: www.platinumcityroversfc.co.za

Platinum City Rovers F.C. (formerly Polokwane City Rovers) is a South African football club based in the small North West town of Mogwase.

They earned promotion to the 2021–22 National First Division after finishing second in the 2020–21 SAFA Second Division playoffs. The North West province then got its first soccer team in the two highest divisions for men, after Platinum Stars had bowed out in 2018.

They were relegated at the end of the 2023–24 National First Division season.

== League record ==
=== SAFA Second Division North West Division ===
- 2015–16 – 2nd
- 2016–17 – 2nd
- 2017–18 – 2nd
- 2018–19 – 4th
- 2019–20 – 1st
- 2020–21 – 1st (Stream B)

=== National First Division ===
- 2021–22 – 10th
- 2022–23 – 14th
- 2023–24 – 16th (relegated)
