= SAFA U19 National League =

SAFA Local Football Association
- Country: South Africa
- Confederation: South African Football Association
- Promotion to: SAFA Regional League
- Website: Official Site

The SAFA Loca Football Association is the fifth tier of domestic football in the South African football pyramid.

The competition is split into four phases. The first phase is a nominal league competition between clubs within a Local Football Association's (LFA) jurisdiction. The second phase is a tournament between winners of the LFA leagues to establish a regional winner. The third phase establishes Provincial Winners via a playoff competition between Regional Winners. The fourth phase sees the Provincial Winners compete in the National Play-offs for access to the SAFA Regional League.
