= 2017–18 SAFA Second Division =

SAFA Second Division
- Season: 2017–18
- Champions: Maccabi F.C.
- Promoted: Maccabi F.C.; TS Sporting

The 2017–18 SAFA Second Division (known as the ABC Motsepe League for sponsorship reasons) was the 20th season of the SAFA Second Division, the third tier for South African association football clubs, since its establishment in 1998. Due to the size of South Africa, the competition was split into nine divisions, one for each region. After the league stage of the regional competition was completed, the nine winning teams of each regional division entered the playoffs.

It was won by Maccabi F.C., who beat TS Sporting 5-4 on penalties. Both teams were promoted to the 2018-19 National First Division

== Regions ==
=== Eastern Cape ===
Pos	Team	Pld	W	D	L	GF	GA	GD	Pts	Qualification or relegation
1	Tornado F.C.	26	24	1	1	70	20	+50	73	Playoffs
2	EC Bees	26	13	10	3	51	22	+29	49	
3	PE Stars	26	13	7	6	46	21	+25	46	
4	Spears F.C.	26	12	5	9	35	27	+8	41	
5	Bizano Pondo Chiefs	26	12	2	12	53	46	+7	38	
6	Future Tigers	26	12	1	13	30	33	−3	37	
7	City Lads	26	9	6	11	37	43	−6	33	
8	Matta Milan	26	8	9	9	35	43	−8	33	
9	Highbury F.C.	26	8	6	12	38	51	−13	30	
10	Swartkops Valley United Brothers	26	7	7	12	34	45	−11	28	
11	Sibanye F.C.	26	7	6	13	28	38	−10	27	
12	Lions City	26	7	5	14	30	38	−8	26	
13	Butterworth F.C.	26	6	8	12	23	71	−48	26	
14	Try Again F.C.	26	5	5	16	25	61	−36	20	

Source: https://diskizone.com/table/abc-motsepe-league-eastern-cape-20172018/

F.C. Buffalo and Mthatha City were both expelled from the league.

=== Free State ===
Pos	Team	Pld	W	D	L	GF	GA	GD	Pts	Qualification or relegation
1	Mangaung Unite	28	20	4	4	64	22	+42	64	Playoffs
2	Bloemfontein Young Tigers	28	20	4	4	50	14	+36	64	
3	Tshiame All Stars	28	16	4	8	47	26	+21	52	
4	Bloemfontein Celtic Development	28	14	6	8	44	34	+10	48	
5	Harmony FC	28	10	10	8	36	32	+4	40	
6	Central University	28	9	8	11	35	38	−3	35	
7	Lijabatho FC	28	10	5	13	36	42	−6	35	
8	Sibanye Golden Stars	28	8	11	9	35	43	−8	35	
9	Free State Stars Academy	28	9	6	13	40	39	+1	33	
10	Kovsies	28	8	9	11	37	38	−1	33	
11	Dikwena United	28	8	9	11	37	48	−11	33	
12	Dia 2 FC	28	8	5	15	24	51	−27	29	
13	Days FC	28	8	3	17	27	48	−21	27	
14	African Warriors	28	6	8	14	27	44	−17	26	
15	Kingston FC	28	6	8	14	14	35	−21	26	
16	Young Masters (expelled)	0	0	0	0	0	61	−61	0	

Source: https://diskizone.com/table/abc-motsepe-free-state-20172018/

Young Masters were expelled from the league.

=== Gauteng ===
Pos	Team	Pld	W	D	L	GF	GA	GD	Pts	Qualification or relegation
1	Maccabi FC	30	19	7	4	50	18	+32	64	Playoffs
2	JDR Stars	30	18	9	3	39	21	+18	63	
3	Dondol Stars	29	17	2	10	36	25	+11	53	
4	Alexandra United	30	15	7	8	34	20	+14	52	
5	African All Stars	30	15	6	9	42	22	+20	51	
6	Swallows	30	13	10	7	39	32	+7	49	
7	Vaal Professionals	30	12	10	8	29	28	+1	46	
8	Baberwa	30	11	11	8	43	38	+5	44	
9	M Tigers	30	10	13	7	45	28	+17	43	
10	Pretoria Callies	30	9	6	15	37	49	−12	33	
11	Dube Continental	30	8	7	15	29	38	−9	31	
12	Tembisa Sports Centre	30	7	10	13	28	41	−13	31	
13	Valencia FC	30	8	7	15	37	51	−14	31	
14	Alexandra Black Aces	30	8	5	17	36	54	−18	29	
15	Leruma United	30	5	12	13	33	41	−8	27	
16	Garankuwa United	30	1	5	24	12	68	−56	8	

Source: https://diskizone.com/table/abc-motsepe-league-gauteng-20172018/

=== Kwazulu-Natal ===
Pos	Team	Pld	W	D	L	GF	GA	GD	Pts	Qualification or relegation
1	Umvoti	28	23	4	1	44	11	+33	73	Playoffs
2	Milford FC	28	16	6	6	39	23	+16	54	
3	Happy Wanderers	28	16	5	7	52	19	+33	53	
4	Ashley United	28	16	5	7	39	27	+12	53	
5	GWP Friends	28	13	5	10	37	36	+1	44	
6	Natal United	28	12	6	10	41	29	+12	42	
7	Summerfield Dynamos	28	11	6	11	31	29	+2	39	
8	KwaDukuza United	28	9	8	11	34	34	0	35	
9	Durban FC	28	10	5	13	35	39	−4	35	
10	Maritzburg City	28	10	4	14	28	30	−2	34	
11	Edendale Juventus	28	9	6	13	31	38	−7	33	
12	Ladysmith United	28	7	8	13	28	33	−5	29	
13	Seskhona FC	28	7	5	16	20	54	−34	26	
14	KwaMashu All Stars	28	5	6	17	13	38	−25	21	
15	Phenduka FC	28	5	3	20	14	46	−32	18	

Source: https://diskizone.com/table/abc-motsepe-kwazulu-natal-log-20172018/

=== Limpopo ===
Pos	Team	Pld	W	D	L	GF	GA	GD	Pts	Qualification or relegation
1	The Dolphins	30	21	5	4	55	20	+35	68	Playoffs
2	Boyne Tigers F.C.	30	16	9	5	58	29	+29	57	
3	Polokwane United	30	16	6	8	56	32	+24	54	
4	Great North F.C.	30	15	9	6	41	26	+15	54	
5	Ndengeza FC	30	15	5	10	61	44	+17	50	
6	Ollestads FC	30	12	7	11	34	32	+2	43	
7	Polokwane City Academy	30	11	10	9	37	39	−2	43	
8	Mikhado FC	30	11	6	13	42	42	0	39	
9	Madridtas	20	1	6	13	40	50	−10	9	
10	Molemole Academy	30	9	9	12	36	44	−8	36	
11	Ditlou F.C.	30	8	11	11	34	38	−4	35	
12	Magesi F.C.	30	9	7	14	40	48	−8	34	
13	Mighty F.C.	30	9	7	14	27	43	−16	34	
14	Ablex FC	29	9	4	16	41	58	−17	31	
15	Musina United FC	29	7	4	18	33	58	−25	25	
16	Giyani Hotspurs	30	5	5	20	35	67	−32	20	

Source: https://diskizone.com/table/abc-motsepe-league-limpopo-20172018/

=== Mpumalanga ===
Pos	Team	Pld	W	D	L	GF	GA	GD	Pts	Qualification or relegation
1	TS Sporting FC	97	20	75	2	52	15	+37	135	Playoffs
2	Mlambo Royal Cubs	30	14	9	7	50	28	+22	51	
3	Tjakastad Junior Shepard	30	15	4	11	46	41	+5	49	
4	Witbank Citylads	30	12	9	9	35	34	+1	45	
5	TS Galaxy	30	13	5	12	44	29	+15	44	
6	City Rangers	29	13	5	11	46	43	+3	44	
7	FC Zone Mavo	30	13	4	13	44	45	−1	43	
8	Phiva Young Stars	29	22	7	0	66	15	+51	73	
9	Nkomazi Real Aces	29	10	5	14	38	50	−12	35	
10	Mhluzi Black Rangers	30	9	7	14	26	46	−20	34	
11	F.C Benfica	30	9	4	17	41	70	−29	31	
12	Barberton City Stars	27	8	6	13	25	35	−10	30	
13	Secunda M Stars	30	7	8	15	35	50	−15	29	
14	Lumoja FC	29	8	5	16	29	47	−18	29	
15	Mapulaneng United	28	8	3	17	33	41	−8	27	
16	Bushbuckridge Eagles	30	6	8	16	39	60	−21	26	

Source: https://diskizone.com/table/abc-motsepe-league-mpumalanga-20172018/

=== Northern Cape ===
==== Stream A ====
Pos	Team	Pld	W	D	L	GF	GA	GD	Pts	Qualification or relegation
1	Hungry Lions	14	8	3	3	26	16	+10	27	Playoffs
2	Olympics	14	7	5	2	31	13	+18	26	
3	Kakamas Juventus	14	6	8	0	34	26	+8	26	
4	Kakamas Sundowns	14	7	5	2	28	21	+7	26	
5	Mainstay United	14	3	6	5	28	32	−4	15	
6	Tornado FC	14	4	2	8	25	27	−2	14	
7	Rasta Far Eagles	14	2	3	9	22	30	−8	9	
8	Morester Jeug	14	2	2	10	21	50	−29	8	

Source: https://diskizone.com/table/abc-motsepe-league-northern-cape-stream-a-20172018/

==== Stream B ====
Pos	Team	Pld	W	D	L	GF	GA	GD	Pts	Qualification or relegation
1	Magareng Young Stars	12	8	3	1	27	6	+21	27	Playoffs
2	United Rovers	12	8	3	1	28	10	+18	27	
3	Northern Cape Liverpool	12	5	5	2	22	13	+9	20	
4	Coville United	12	6	2	4	24	19	+5	20	
5	William Prescod A. F.C.	12	4	1	7	11	16	−5	13	
6	Olifantshoek Young Stars	12	1	3	8	17	41	−24	6	
7	Kuruman Kicks F.C.	12	1	1	10	9	33	−24	4	
8	Young Pirates (expelled)	0	0	0	0	0	0	0	0	

Source: https://diskizone.com/table/abc-motsepe-league-northern-cape-stream-b-20172018/

=== North-West ===
Pos	Team	Pld	W	D	L	GF	GA	GD	Pts	Qualification or relegation
1	Buya Msuthu F.C.	30	26	3	1	68	14	+54	81	Playoffs
2	Polokwane City Rovers	30	23	6	1	77	23	+54	75	
3	FC Palmeros	30	21	5	4	49	20	+29	68	
4	Orbit College	30	18	3	9	53	31	+22	57	
5	Moretele Gunners	30	14	6	10	35	37	−2	48	
6	Northwest University	30	14	4	12	56	36	+20	46	
7	Matlosana United	30	14	6	10	35	37	−2	48	
8	Ally's Tigers	30	7	13	10	35	36	−1	34	
9	Makapanstad Romans F.C.	30	8	7	15	36	54	−18	31	
10	Tigane Chelsea	30	7	9	14	34	53	−19	30	
11	Phatsima All Stars	30	6	12	12	20	39	−19	30	
12	Marauding Classic	30	9	2	19	34	39	−5	29	
13	Glamour Boys	30	7	7	16	28	50	−22	28	
14	Thaba Tshwane FC	30	6	7	17	38	56	−18	25	
15	AC Milan	30	5	8	17	38	85	−47	23	
16	Platinum Stars Development	30	5	7	18	22	48	−26	22	

Source: https://diskizone.com/table/abc-motsepe-league-north-west-20172018/

=== Western Cape ===
Pos	Team	Pld	W	D	L	GF	GA	GD	Pts	Qualification or relegation
1	Steenberg United	30	22	5	3	63	26	+37	71	Playoffs
2	The Magic	30	20	4	6	58	26	+32	64	
3	Ace F.C	30	19	7	4	55	25	+30	64	
4	Grassy Park United	30	15	7	8	51	40	+11	52	
5	Hout Bay United	30	14	6	10	52	35	+17	48	
6	Santos	30	11	11	8	33	23	+10	44	
7	Glendene United	30	12	7	11	45	44	+1	43	
8	Ajax Cape Town Youth	30	11	6	13	44	47	−3	39	
9	Zizwe United	30	10	7	13	37	39	−2	37	
10	D&G Orient	30	10	6	14	44	54	−10	36	
11	Barcelona	30	9	7	14	34	48	−14	34	
12	Ikapa Sporting	30	9	5	16	37	41	−4	32	
13	Royal Blues	30	8	6	16	34	49	−15	30	
14	Jomos Power	30	8	4	18	35	72	−37	28	
15	Atlantic Nacional	30	5	9	16	24	45	−21	24	
16	United FC	30	5	7	18	33	65	−32	22	

Source: https://diskizone.com/table/abc-motsepe-league-western-cape-20172018/
