= Maluti FET College F.C. =

Maluti TVET College
- Full name: Maluti TVET College Football Club
- Founded: 2008; 17 years ago (renamed Mathata Take Me Cool)
- Ground: Charles Mopeli Stadium, Phuthaditjhaba
- Capacity: 50,000
- Chairman: Dr mang
- Coach: (South Africa) Morena Ramoreboli
Home colours	Away colours

Maluti TVET College is a South African football club based in Phuthaditjhaba, Free State.

The team represents the Maluti TVET College which has a number of campuses around the Free State, including Bethlehem, Bonamelo, Harrismith, Itemoheleng, Kwetlisong and Sefikeng.

== History ==
The team was founded in 2008 after the purchase of Vodacom League franchise Mathata Take Me Cool. Maluti caused one of the biggest shocks in South African cup football when they defeated Premiership team Orlando Pirates 4–1 in the 2012–13 Nedbank Cup first round. Maluti won the 2012–13 SAFA Second Division Free State League and their national play-off group to win promotion to the National First Division.

They were relegated in the 2014–15 season.

=== League record ===
==== SAFA Second Division ====
- 2012–13 – 1st (Free State stream), champions, promoted

==== National First Division ====
- 2013–14 – 14th
- 2014–15 – 16th (relegated)

==== SAFA Second Division ====
- 2015–16 – 15th (Free State stream) (relegated)
