= 2018–19 National First Division =

National First Division
- Season: 2018–19
- Champions: Stellenbosch FC
- Promoted: Stellenbosch FC
- Relegated: Ubuntu Cape Town; Witbank Spurs

The 2018–19 National First Division was the season from August 2018 to May 2019 of South Africa's second tier of professional soccer, the National First Division. Stellenbosch FC were crowned champions on the final day, following a 0–0 draw with Maccabi FC.

== League table ==
Pos	Team	Pld	W	D	L	GF	GA	GD	Pts	Promotion, qualification or relegation
1	Stellenbosch F.C. (C, P)	30	16	8	6	45	21	+24	56	Promotion to 2019–20 South African Premier Division
2	Royal Eagles	30	15	8	7	42	22	+20	53	Qualification to Promotion play-offs
3	Tshakhuma Tsha Madzivhandila	30	14	9	7	39	26	+13	51	Qualification to Promotion play-offs
4	Ajax Cape Town	30	15	6	9	41	29	+12	51	
5	Uthongathi	30	11	11	8	30	24	+6	44	
6	Mbombela United	30	12	8	10	34	30	+4	44	
7	Richards Bay	30	11	9	10	28	34	−6	42	
8	TS Galaxy	30	9	11	10	31	28	+3	38	Qualification to Confederation Cup (Note: TS Galaxy qualified as 2018–19 Nedbank Cup winners.)
9	TS Sporting	30	10	8	12	26	32	−6	38	
10	Cape Umoya United	30	9	10	11	26	28	−2	37	
11	Maccabi F.C.	30	9	9	12	33	36	−3	36	
12	Real Kings F.C.	30	9	9	12	31	34	−3	36	
13	Jomo Cosmos	30	8	11	11	27	29	−2	35	
14	University of Pretoria	30	9	8	13	28	49	−21	35	
15	Ubuntu Cape Town (R)	30	9	7	14	31	38	−7	34	Relegation to 2019–20 SAFA Second Division
16	Witbank Spurs (R)	30	5	6	19	23	55	−32	21	Relegation to 2019–20 SAFA Second Division

Updated to match(es) played on 5 May 2019. Source: https://nl.soccerway.com/national/south-africa/1st-division/20182019/regular-season/r47549/
Rules for classification: 1) Points; 2) Goal difference; 3) Number of goals scored;
(C) Champions; (P) Promoted; (R) Relegated

== Play-offs ==
Pos	Lge	Team	Pld	W	D	L	GF	GA	GD	Pts	Qualification
1	PRE	Maritzburg United (P)	4	4	0	0	7	1	+6	12	Retain their place in the 2019-20 South African Premier Division
2	NFD	Tshakhuma Tsha Madzivhandila	4	1	0	3	3	6	−3	3	
3	NFD	Royal Eagles	4	1	0	3	2	5	−3	3	

Source: https://www.psl.co.za/tournament/nfd-playoffs
Rules for classification: 1) Points; 2) Goal difference; 3) Number of goals scored;
(P) Promoted

== See also ==
- 2018-19 South African Premier Division
- 2018-19 Nedbank Cup
