= Steenberg United F.C. =

South African association football club

Steenberg United
- Full name: Steenberg United Football Club
- Founded: 2003; 23 years ago
- Ground: Parow Park
- Manager: Mike Lukhubene
- League: SAFA Second Division

Steenberg United is a South African football club based in Cape Town, Western Cape, which plays its home matches at Parow Park. The club spent two seasons in the National First Division, the second tier of South African football, between 2019 and 2021.

== History ==
Steenberg United won the Western Cape Stream of the 2018–19 SAFA Second Division, earning the right to play in the play-offs for promotion to the 2019–20 National First Division for the third time in four years.

The club reached the play-off final, where it lost 1–0 to JDR Stars, but was nonetheless promoted to the National First Division for the 2019–20 season.

Steenberg finished eighth in its first National First Division season. The following season the club won only seven of its thirty matches and finished fifteenth, and was relegated to the 2021–22 SAFA Second Division.

== Seasons ==
League record in the National First Division:

Season	Division	League record							Pos.
Season	Division	Pld	W	D	L	GF	GA	Pts	Pos.
2019–20	National First Division	30	9	12	9	35	36	39	8th
2020–21	National First Division	30	7	9	14	27	41	30	15th (Note: Relegated to the SAFA Second Division.)
Total		60	16	21	23	62	77	69	

== Honours ==
- SAFA Second Division Western Cape Stream

Winners – 2008–09, 2015–16, 2017–18, 2018–19
