= M Tigers F.C. =

Association football club in South Africa

M Tigers
- Full name: Mahlangu Tigers
- Founded: 2007
- Ground: Mehlareng Stadium, Tembisa, Ekurhuleni, Gauteng, South Africa
- Capacity: 10,000
- Chairman: Elijah Mahlang
- Head Coach: Louis Mabotsa
- League: SAFA Second Division (Gauteng Stream)
- 2024–25 season: 15th

M Tigers F.C. was a South African soccer club, with the full official name Mahlangu Tigers, based in Tembisa, Gauteng. The club was previously known as PJ Stars Kings. In May 2007, PJ Stars Kings were deducted 15 points by SAFA for using unregistered players. After this point deduction, the team suffered a relegation from National First Division, to play the next season in SAFA Second Division. The club was at this point of time either sold or renamed to "M Tigers FC".

M Tigers are a feeder team for Mamelodi Sundowns.

In October 2024, the club sold its status in the Gauteng ABC Motsepe League to TUT F.C. (Tshwane University of Technology F.C.)

== Achievements ==
In the first season of the renamed club, they won the Gauteng stream of the 2007-08 SAFA Second Division and qualified for the play-off stage as one of the 5 provincial winners from the Inland stream. They finished third in the group, with 4 points from 4 matches and failed to gain promotion.

== League record ==
=== SAFA Second Division ===
- 2015–16 – 7th
- 2016–17 – 14th
- 2017–18 – 9th
- 2018–19 – 6th
- 2019–20 – 15th
- 2020–21 – 3rd (Stream A)
- 2021–22 – 8th (Stream B)
- 2022–23 – 8th
- 2023–24 – 9th
- 2024–25 – 15th (status sold)
