= Royal AM F.C. =

- Full name: Royal AM Football Club
- Nickname: Thwihli Thwahla
- Dissolved: 2024
- Ground: Harry Gwala Stadium
- Capacity: 12,000
- Owner: Shauwn Mkhize
- Chairman: Andile Mpisane
- Manager: John Maduka
- League: Premiership
- 2024–25: 16th (expelled)
colours	colours	colours

Royal AM Football Club, also commonly referred to as Thwihli Thwahla, was a South African professional soccer club based in Pietermaritzburg that played in the Premiership until expelled in 2025 due to financial collapse.

== History ==
Originally, the club was called Kings United, before changing its name to Real Kings.

In 2019, Shauwn Mkhize and her son Andile Mpisane purchased Real Kings, renaming it Royal AM.

They bought their right to play in the top tier after purchasing the Premiership license from Bloemfontein Celtic in August 2021.

The club received a transfer ban from FIFA effective 3 July 2023 after unlawfully terminating the contract of Samir Nurković and failing to pay the outstanding amount of R12 million.

== Sponsorship controversy ==
In August 2023, the heavily indebted Msunduzi Local Municipality stated that it was going ahead with a R27 million three-year sponsorship of Royal AM.

== Financial collapse ==
In January 2025, the South African Revenue Service (SARS) issued a preservation order against the club over unpaid tax debts by owner Shauwn Mkhize. In addition, players did not receive their December 2024 salaries, and the club's upcoming fixtures were postponed by the league's governing body, the Premier Soccer League (PSL). In March 2025, SARS put the club up for auction.

In April 2025, the PSL's Board of Governors, consisting of the 15 Premiership teams (excluding Royal AM), and 16 National First Division teams, voted to expel Royal AM from the league.

== Honours ==
- SAFA Second Division Kwazulu Natal Stream: 2015–16 (Note: The league was known as the ABC Motsepe League at the time due to sponsorship reasons.)
- Macufe Cup
  - Winners: 2022

== League record ==
=== SAFA Second Division (KwaZulu-Natal Stream) ===
- 2015–16 – 1st

=== National First Division ===
- 2016–17 – 11th
- 2017–18 – 4th
- 2018–19 – 12th
- 2019–20 – 4th
- 2020–21 – 2nd

=== Premiership ===
- 2021–22 – 3rd
- 2022–23 – 11th
- 2023–24 – 13th
- 2024–25 – 16th (expelled)
