= Hungry Lions F.C. =

South African football club

- Full name: Hungry Lions Football Club
- Nickname: Malapipes
- Founded: 1980s
- Ground: Griqua Park, Kimberley
- Capacity: 11,000
- Chairman: Henry Basie
- League: National First Division
- 2025–26: 5th

Hungry Lions F.C. are a South African football club based in the small Northern Cape town of Postmasburg.

They currently play in the National First Division, earning promotion after winning the 2020–21 SAFA Second Division.

== History ==
Hungry Lions was founded in the 1980s by Stefaans Basie‚ who was later replaced by his nephew Henry Basie as owner and chairman. After initially playing friendlies and once-off tournaments, they entered competitive leagues in 2000, working themselves up from local leagues, then the SAB League, until around 2004 they were promoted to the SAFA Second Division.

== Honours ==
- SAFA Second Division: 2020–21
- SAFA Second Division, Northern Cape Stream A/South Stream: 2017–18, 2018–19, 2020–21

== League record ==
=== SAFA Second Division Northern Cape Stream ===
- 2017–18 – 1st (Stream A)
- 2018–19 – 1st (Stream A)
- 2019–20 – 1st
- 2020–21 – 1st (South Stream), champions, promoted

=== National First Division ===
- 2021–22 – 11th
- 2022–23 – 5th
- 2023–24 – 8th
- 2024–25 – 13th
- 2025–26 – 5th
