= Real Native F.C. =

South African football club

Real Native
- Full name: Real Native Football Club
- Nickname: The Believers
- Founded: 2012; 14 years ago as FC Palmeiras
- Ground: Solomon Mahlangu Stadium
- Capacity: 5,000
- Chairman: Caswell Mkansi
- Coach: Joseph Bucs Mthombeni
- League: National First Division
- 2025–26: 4th of 16
- Website: https://www.realnativefc.co.za/
Home colours	Away colours

Real Native, formerly Casric Stars is a South African football club based in KwaMhlanga in Mpumalanga.

The club plays in the National First Division, after purchasing the status belonging to Free State Stars before the start of the 2022–23 National First Division.

== History ==
The club was founded in 2012/13 as FC Palmeiras, and initially competed in the North West stream of the ABC Motsepe League. It changed its name to Casric F.C. during the 2017/18 season.

Casric Stars changed its name to Real Native prior to the start of the 2026–27 National First Division.

=== Nedbank Cup ===
Stars' most notable victory came in the 2025–26 Nedbank Cup, when they defeated Orlando Pirates 4-5 via penalties in the round of 16. They reached the semi-finals after a 2–1 extra-time win against AmaZulu.

== Honours ==
- SAFA Second Division, North West Stream: 2018–19

== League record ==
=== SAFA Second Division North-West Stream ===
- 2015–16 – 6th
- 2016–17 – 3rd
- 2017–18 – 3rd
- 2018–19 – 1st

=== National First Division ===
- 2022–23 – 3rd
- 2023–24 – 7th
- 2024–25 – 3rd
- 2025–26 – 4th
