= Pretoria Callies F.C. =

South African football club based in Pretoria, Gauteng

- Full name: Pretoria Callies Football Club
- Founded: 1898
- Stadium: Lucas Masterpieces Moripe Stadium
- Capacity: 28,900
- Coordinates: 25°46′33.31″S 28°4′22.33″E
- Chairman: Moses Malada
- League: National First Division
- 2024–25: 11th

Pretoria Callies Football Club, also known as Bantu Callies or Pretoria Bantu Callies, is a South African professional soccer club based in Pretoria, Gauteng, who played in the National First Division until selling its status to Lerumo Lions prior to the start of the 2025–26 National First Division.

== History ==
The club was founded in 1898, and were founder members of the National Professional Soccer League, later playing in the National Soccer League.

In 2020, the club earned promotion to the National First Division as runners-up of the 2019–20 SAFA Second Division.

The club finished eleventh in the 2024–25 National First Division, but experienced financial difficulties, with delays in paying player's salaries.

== Stadium ==
Callies play at the Lucas Masterpieces Moripe Stadium in Atteridgeville.

== Honours ==
- SAFA Second Division
  - Runners-up (1): 2019–20

== League record ==
=== NPSL First Division ===
- 1971 – 7th
- 1974 – 4th
- 1976 – 8th

=== NSL First Division ===
- 1985 – 14th
- 1986 – 18th (relegated)

=== SAFA Second Division Gauteng Stream ===
- 2017–18 – 10th
- 2018–19 – 8th
- 2019–20 – 1st (promoted)

=== National First Division ===
- 2020–21 – 8th
- 2021–22 – 12th
- 2022–23 – 10th
- 2023–24 – 14th
- 2024–25 – 11th
