= SAFA Second Division =

South African association football league

ABC Motsepe League
- Founded: 1998; 28 years ago
- Country: South Africa
- Confederation: CAF
- Divisions: 9
- Level on pyramid: 3
- Promotion to: National First Division
- Relegation to: SAFA Regional League
- Domestic cup: Nedbank Cup
- Current champions: Hope
- Most championships: Roses United
- Website: www.safa.net
- Current: 2026–27 SAFA Second Division

The SAFA Second Division (known as the ABC Motsepe League for sponsorship reasons, and previously the Vodacom League between 1998 and 2012, was founded in 1998 as the overall third tier of South African football. The competition is regulated by SAFA, and until 2012 had been sponsored by mobile telecommunications company Vodacom.

It is divided into 9 divisions, borders decided by the 9 geo-political provinces of South Africa: Eastern Cape, Free State, KwaZulu Natal, Northern Cape, Western Cape, Gauteng, Limpopo, Mpumalanga and North West. The winner of each provincial division qualifies for the annual promotion playoffs, where the top two teams are promoted to the National First Division. In each province, teams are relegated to the fourth tier U21 SAB Regional League, which in return will promote playoff winners from the Regional Championships.

All clubs in South Africa also are allowed to compete with youth teams (U19/U21) and/or a reserve team in a lower SAFA league. If a club opt to field such teams, the U19 teams will start out at the fifth level in the U19 National League, while U21 teams or reserve teams will start out at the fourth level in the U21 SAB Regional League. If any U19 team win promotion for U21 SAB Regional League or SAFA Second Division, this promotion is fully accepted. No club are entitled to field two teams at the same level, and rule 4.6.4 of the SAFA regulations states that if the mother club play in the National First Division or Premiership, then the highest level these additional Youth/Reserve teams are allowed to compete will be the SAFA Second Division. In such cases, where a non-promotable team wins their regional division, the ticket for the promotional playoffs will instead be handed over to the second-best team in the division.

In March 2014, the Motsepe Foundation signed a five-year deal for the naming rights of the competition worth 40 million ZAR. Patrice Motsepe named the competition in honour of his late father, Augustine Butana Chaane Motsepe. The sponsorship was renewed for five years in 2018.

== Provincial divisions ==
Map of the two streams in the SAFA Second Division. Inland Stream Coastal Stream

The 9 geographical provinces of South Africa, each have a local division in the SAFA Second Division. These divisions belong either to the Inland Stream or Coastal Stream, which are used to place the provincial winners into two round robin groups, at the promotional playoff stage by the end of the season. The Coastal Stream comprises: Eastern Cape, Free State, KwaZulu-Natal, Northern Cape, Western Cape; while the Inland Stream comprises: Gauteng, Limpopo, Mpumalanga and North West. In previous years, until August 2008, the Free State province belonged to the Inland Stream.

== Maladministration ==
In June 2023, Bush Bucks owner Sturu Pasiya accused SAFA of maladministration and of not paying grants for up to three years.

== Champions and promoted teams ==
In the seasons from 1998 to 2003, the four best teams from the Vodacom League—determined by annual playoffs among the winners and runners-up of the 9 provinces in South Africa—won promotion for the National First Division. The playoff system divided the teams into an Inland Stream and Coastal Stream, where the best two teams from each stream won promotion.

In the seasons after 2003, the number of annually promoted teams decreased to 2. The concept of the playoff system, however, remained the same, in regards of dividing the teams into a Coastal Stream and Inland Stream, but now of course only to reward the winner of both streams with promotion. Both promoted teams will then finally also meet to play the overall final, where the overall league championship trophy is at stake.

The list below show all the promoted teams, since 1998.

Promoted Teams
| Season | Inland Stream | Coastal Stream |
|---|---|---|
| 1998–99 | Arcadia Shepherds; Mapate Silver Stars | Premier United; Blackburn Rovers |
| 1999–00 | Ledwaba Power Stars; Alexandra United | Maritzburg City; Basotho Tigers |
| 2000–01 | Welkom Stars; Mamelodi Juventus | William Prescod; PE Technikon |
| 2001–02 | Maholosiane; Peoples Bank Spurs | Moja United; Juventus (Western Cape) |
| 2002–03 | Winners Park; FC Sporting | Vasco da Gama; Blackburn Rovers |
Promoted Teams
| Season | Winner | Runner-up |
| 2003–04 | Pretoria University | Louisvale Pirates |
| 2004–05 | Witbank Spurs | PJ Stars Kings |
| 2005–06 | OR Tambo DC | Garankuwa United |
| 2006–07 | African Warriors | Hanover Park |
| 2007–08 | Vasco da Gama | Carara Kicks |
| 2008–09 | United | Batau |
| 2009–10 | FC AK | Blackburn Rovers |
| 2010–11 | Chippa United | Sivutsa Stars |
| 2011–12 | Roses United F.C. | Milano United F.C. |
| 2012–13 | Baroka | Maluti FET College |
| 2013–14 | Cape Town All Stars | Highlands Park |
| 2014–15 | Mbombela United | Mthatha Bucks |
| 2015–16 | Magesi F.C | Kings United |
| 2016–17 | Uthongathi | Super Eagles |
| 2017–18 | Maccabi | TS Sporting |
| 2018–19 | JDR Stars | Steenberg United |
| 2019–20 | Bizana Pondo Chiefs | Pretoria Callies |
| 2020–21 | Hungry Lions | Platinum City Rovers |
| 2021–22 | MM Platinum | Magesi |
| 2022–23 | Upington City | Orbit College |
| 2023–24 | Highbury | Kruger United |
| 2024–25 | Gomora United | The Bees, Midlands Wanderers |
| 2025–26 | Hope FC / Sea Point Swifts | North West University Soccer Institute |

== Provincial winners ==
=== Coastal Stream ===
==== Eastern Cape ====
| Year | Winner | Runner-Up |
|---|---|---|
| 1998–99 | Glenville Celtic | |
| 1999–00 | Blackburn Rovers | |
| 2000–01 | PE Technikon | PE Tigers |
| 2001–02 | Blackburn Rovers | PE Tigers |
| 2002–03 | UPE-FCK | Blackburn Rovers |
| 2003–04 | | |
| 2004–05 | | |
| 2005–06 | | |
| 2006–07 | Lion City | |
| 2007–08 | Bush Bucks | Matat Professionals F.C. |
| 2008–09 | Blackburn Rovers | |
| 2009–10 | Blackburn Rovers | Tornado |
| 2010–11 | Buffalo | Tornado |
| 2011–12 | Tornado | |
| 2012–13 | | |
| 2013–14 | | |
| 2014–15 | | |
| 2015–16 | Tornado | Lion City FC |
| 2016–17 | EC Bees FC | Future Tigers |
| 2017–18 | Tornado | EC Bees FC |
| 2018–19 | Tornado | Mthatha Bucks |
| 2019–20 | Bizana Pondo Chiefs | Spear of the Nation |
| Season | Stream A | Stream B |
| 2020–21 | Spear of the Nation | BCM Stars |
| 2021–22 | Spear of the Nation | BCM Stars |
| 2022–23 | Amavarara | Peace Makers FC |
| Year | Winner | Runner-Up |
| 2023–24 | Highbury | Sinenkani |
| 2024–25 | FC Ravens | Amavarara |
| 2025–26 | FC Ravens | Old Grey |

==== Kwazulu Natal ====
| Season | Winner | Runner-Up |
|---|---|---|
| 1998–99 | | |
| 1999–00 | | |
| 2000–01 | Nathi Stars | Leeds United |
| 2001–02 | Moja United | Greenpoint Vultures |
| 2002–03 | Nathi Stars | Italian Juventus |
| 2003–04 | | |
| 2004–05 | | |
| 2005–06 | | |
| 2006–07 | Abaqulusi | |
| 2007–08 | Island | Rangers |
| 2008–09 | Newcastle Sicilians | |
| 2009–10 | Island | African Wanderers |
| 2010–11 | Durban Stars | Sobantu Shooting Stars |
| 2011–12 | Maritzburg City | |
| 2012–13 | | |
| 2013–14 | | |
| 2014–15 | Maluti FET College | |
| 2015–16 | Kings United FC | Uthongathi FC |
| 2016–17 | Uthongathi FC | Umvoti |
| 2017–18 | Umvoti | Milford FC |
| 2018–19 | Summerfield Dynamos | Happy Wanderers |
| 2019–20 | Umvoti | Summerfield Dynamos |
| Season | Stream A | Stream B |
| 2020–21 | Umvoti | Real Kings |
| 2021–22 | Summerfield Dynamos | GWP Friends |
| 2022–23 | Milford FC | uMsinga United |
| 2023–24 | Njampela FC | uMsinga United |
| 2024–25 | Midland Wanderers | Mkhambathi |
| 2025–26 | Mkhambathi | Umvoti |

==== Northern Cape ====
| Season | Winner | Runner-Up |
|---|---|---|
| 1998–99 | | |
| 1999–00 | Glenville | |
| 2000–01 | William Prescod | Louisvale Pirates |
| 2001–02 | Young Pirates | Louisvale Pirates |
| 2002–03 | Dalton Brothers | Olympics |
| 2003–04 | | |
| 2004–05 | | |
| 2005–06 | | |
| 2006–07 | Kakamas Cosmos | |
| 2007–08 | William Pescod F.C. | Louisvale Pirates F.C. |
| 2008–09 | Real Madrid | |
| 2009–10 | Kakamas Sundowns | Wings United |
| 2010–11 | Real Madrid | Steach United |
| 2011–12 | Morester Jeug | |
| 2012–13 | | |
| 2013–14 | | |
| 2014–15 | | |
| Season | Stream A | Stream B |
| 2015–16 | Morester Jeug | Colville United |
| 2016–17 | Mainstay United | Magareng Young Stars FC |
| 2017–18 | Hungry Lions | Magareng Young Stars FC |
| 2018–19 | Hungry Lions | United Rovers |
| Season | Winner | Runner-Up |
| 2019–20 | Hungry Lions | NC Professionals |
| Season | South Stream | West Stream |
| 2020–21 | Hungry Lions | NC Professionals |
| Season | Stream A | Stream B |
| 2021–22 | Upington City | Real Madrid |
| Season | Winner | Runner-Up |
| 2022–23 | Upington City | Diamond City |
| 2023–24 | NC Professionals | Saints FC |
| 2024–25 | Kakamas Juventus | NC Professionals; Kimberly Saints |
| 2025–26 | NC Professionals | Jacksa Spears |

==== Western Cape ====
| Season | Winner | Runner-Up |
|---|---|---|
| 1998–99 | | |
| 1999–00 | | |
| 2000–01 | Vasco da Gama | Juventus |
| 2001–02 | Juventus | Rygersdal Aces |
| 2002–03 | Vasco da Gama | Clyde Pinelands |
| 2003–04 | | |
| 2004–05 | | |
| 2005–06 | | |
| 2006–07 | Hanover Park | |
| 2007–08 | | Soweto Panthers |
| 2008–09 | Steenberg United | |
| 2009–10 | Mitchells Plain United | Milano United |
| 2010–11 | Chippa United | Milano United |
| 2011–12 | Milano United | |
| 2012–13 | Cape Town All Stars | |
| 2013–14 | Cape Town All Stars | |
| 2014–15 | Glendene United | |
| 2015–16 | Steenberg United | Glendene United FC |
| 2016–17 | Zizwe United | Steenberg United |
| 2017–18 | Steenberg United | The Magic |
| 2018–19 | Steenberg United | The Magic |
| 2019–20 | Zizwe United | FN Rangers |
| 2020–21 | Glendene United | Batalion FC |
| 2021–22 | Zizwe United | FN Rangers |
| 2022–23 | Young Bafana | Zizwe United |
| 2023–24 | FN Rangers | Clarewood |
| 2024–25 | Zizwe United | Hanover Park |
| 2025–26 | Hope FC | Diadora |

=== Coastal Stream / Inland Stream ===
Free State belonged to the Inland Stream from 1998 to 2008, but was transferred to the Coastal Stream for subsequent seasons.

==== Free State ====
| Season | Winner | Runner-Up |
|---|---|---|
| 1998–99 | | |
| 1999–00 | City Drifters | |
| 2000–01 | Welkom Stars | Maholosiane |
| 2001–02 | Maholosiane | Roses United |
| 2002–03 | Phuthaditjhaba United | Dikoena |
| 2003–04 | Kroonstad Rovers | |
| 2004–05 | Motheo United Warriors | |
| 2005–06 | Black Mambas | |
| 2006–07 | African Warriors | |
| 2007–08 | Carara Kicks F.C. | Mafube United F.C. |
| 2008–09 | Crown City United | |
| 2009–10 | Captain Morgan Academy | Maluti FET College |
| 2010–11 | Roses United | Botshabelo |
| 2011–12 | Roses United | Maluti FET College |
| 2012–13 | Maluti FET College | |
| 2013–14 | Motheo Thaba Nchu | Bubchu United |
| 2014–15 | Kroonstad City | Super Eagles |
| 2015–16 | Super Eagles | Mangaung Unite |
| 2016–17 | Mangaung Unite | |
| 2017–18 | Tshiame All Stars | Bloemfontein Young Tigers |
| 2018–19 | Mangaung Unite | |
| 2019–20 | Mangaung Unite | Super Eagles |
| Season | Stream A | Stream B |
| 2020–21 | Mangaung Unite | D General FC |
| 2021–22 | Dikwena United | Bloemfontein Celtic Development |
| 2022–23 | Buffalo FC | FC Black Cross |
| Season | Winner | Runner-Up |
| 2023–24 | D'General FC | Mangaung Unite |
| 2024–25 | African Warriors | Mangaung City |
| 2025–26 | Mangaung Unite | Mangaung City |

=== Inland Stream ===
==== Gauteng ====
| Season | Winner | Runner-Up |
|---|---|---|
| 1998–99 | | |
| 1999–00 | | |
| 2000–01 | Mamelodi Juventus | Mandel Kings |
| 2001–02 | Ennerdale Arcadia | BK Callies |
| 2002–03 | Arcadia Shepherds | Luso Africa |
| 2003–04 | | |
| 2004–05 | P.J Stars | |
| 2005–06 | Yebo Yes United | |
| 2006–07 | Yebo Yes United | |
| 2007–08 | M Tigers | |
| 2008–09 | Lusitano | |
| 2009–10 | FC AK | M Tigers |
| 2010–11 | Highlands Park | Blackpool |
| 2011–12 | The Vardos | |
| 2012–13 | The Vardos | |
| 2013–14 | Highlands Park | |
| 2014–15 | African All Stars | |
| 2015–16 | JDR Stars | AmaBEE |
| 2016–17 | Maccabi | Orange Vaal Professionals |
| 2017–18 | Maccabi | JDR Stars |
| 2018–19 | JDR Stars | Baberwa |
| 2019–20 | Pretoria Callies | Pele Pele |
| Season | Stream A | Stream B |
| 2020-21 | African All Stars | FC RESA |
| 2021-22 | African All Stars | MM Platinum |
| Season | Winner | Runner-Up |
| 2022–23 | Dondol Stars | Pele Pele |
| 2023–24 | Dondol Stars | Highlands Park |
| 2024–25 | Gomora United | La Masia |
| 2025–26 | La Masia | Free Agents |

==== Limpopo ====
| Season | Winner | Runner-Up |
|---|---|---|
| 1998–99 | | |
| 1999–00 | | |
| 2000–01 | Sisterpark | Winnerspark |
| 2001–02 | Winnerspark | Gesane Arsenal |
| 2002–03 | Winnerspark | Gesane Arsenal |
| 2003–04 | | |
| 2004–05 | | |
| 2005–06 | | |
| 2006–07 | Mokopane | |
| 2007–08 | Classic F.C. | The Dolphins F.C. |
| 2008–09 | Peace Lovers | |
| 2009–10 | Peace Lovers | Limpopom United |
| 2010–11 | Baroka | Winners Park |
| 2011–12 | Baroka | |
| 2012–13 | Baroka | |
| 2013–14 | Magezi F.C. | |
| 2014–15 | Magezi F.C. | |
| 2015–16 | Magezi F.C. | The Dolphins |
| 2016–17 | The Dolphins | Bellevue Village Winners Park |
| 2017–18 | The Dolphins | Boyne Tigers F.C. |
| 2018–19 | Mikhado FC | Polokwane United |
| 2019–20 | Mikhado FC | Magesi FC |
| Season | Stream A | Stream B |
| 2020–21 | The Dolphins | Magesi FC |
| 2021–22 | Mpheni Home Defenders | Magesi FC |
| 2022–23 | Mpheni Home Defenders | The Dolphins |
| Season | Winner | Runner-Up |
| 2023–24 | Mpheni Home Defenders | Tzaneen United |
| 2024–25 | Mpheni Home Defenders | The Dolphins |
| 2025–26 | Mpheni Home Defenders | City Motors |

==== Mpumalanga ====
| Season | Winner | Runner-Up |
|---|---|---|
| 1998–99 | | |
| 1999–00 | | |
| 2000–01 | Green Nation | Ferrometals |
| 2001–02 | People's Bank Spurs | Sporting |
| 2002–03 | Sporting | Home Defenders |
| 2003–04 | | |
| 2004–05 | Witbank Spurs | |
| 2005–06 | | |
| 2006–07 | MP Black Aces | |
| 2007–08 | Barberton City Stars F.C. | Batau Killers F.C. |
| 2008–09 | Batau | |
| 2009–10 | Mologadi | Barberton City Stars |
| 2010–11 | Sivutsa Stars | Mighty Mega Force |
| 2011–12 | Batau F.C. | |
| 2012–13 | | |
| 2013–14 | | |
| 2014–15 | | |
| 2015–16 | Appolo XI FC | Acornbush United |
| 2016–17 | Acornbush United | TS Galaxy F.C. |
| 2017–18 | TS Sporting F.C. | Mlambo Royal Cubs FC |
| 2018–19 | Acornbush United | Tjakastad Junior Shepard |
| 2019–20 | Mpumalanga United | Barberton City Stars |
| Season | Stream A | Stream B |
| 2020–21 | Sivutsa Stars | Witbank Shepard |
| 2021–22 | Secunda M Stars | Sabie Bayern |
| 2022–23 | Secunda M Stars | Mlambo Royal Cubs |
| Season | Winner | Runner-Up |
| 2023–24 | Kruger United | Ehlanzeni United |
| 2024–25 | The Bees | Middleburg United |
| 2025–26 | Luthuli Brigades | Phezulu |

==== North West ====
| Season | Winner | Runner-Up |
|---|---|---|
| 1998–99 | | |
| 1999–00 | | |
| 2000–01 | Mafikeng City | Western Aces |
| 2001–02 | Leicester City | Western Aces |
| 2002–03 | Kanana Stars | Anderlecht |
| 2003–04 | | |
| 2004–05 | | |
| 2005–06 | Ga-Rankuwa United | |
| 2006–07 | Madibogopan Blizzards | |
| 2007–08 | City of Matlosane | Mothupi Birds |
| 2008–09 | RNB 54 | |
| 2009–10 | Ga-Rankuwa United | City of Matlosana United |
| 2010–11 | Ga-Rankuwa United | North West Shining Stars |
| 2011–12 | Soshanguve Sunshine | |
| 2012–13 | | |
| 2013–14 | North West Shining Stars | |
| 2014–15 | North West Shining Stars | |
| 2015–16 | Orbit College | Polokwane City Rovers |
| 2016–17 | Buya Msuthu | Polokwane City Rovers |
| 2017–18 | Buya Msuthu | Polokwane City Rovers |
| 2018–19 | Casric | Buya Msuthu |
| 2019–20 | Polokwane City Rovers | Orbit College |
| Season | Stream A | Stream B |
| 2020–21 | Ally's Tigers | Platinum City Rovers |
| 2021–22 | Orbit College | North West University |
| 2022–23 | Orbit College | North West University |
| Season | Winner | Runner-Up |
| 2023–24 | Thames FC | Army Rockets FC |
| 2024–25 | Thames FC | Lerumo Lions |
| 2025–26 | North West University Soccer Institute | Army Rockets |
