= JDR Stars F.C. =

JDR Stars
- Nickname: The Hammer Boyz
- Ground: Giant Stadium
- League: National First Division
- 2024–25: 7th
- Website: jdrstarsfc.com

JDR Stars was a South African football club based in Pretoria formed in 2011. The club played in the National First Division. The club was owned by Nditsheni Nemasisi, who is an attorney.

JDR Stars was sold to Leicesterford City at the end of the 2024–25 season.

== Honours ==
- 2011–12 SAB League Champions (Promoted to ABC Motsepe League)
- Gauteng ABC Motsepe League Champions: 2015–16, 2018–19
- National ABC Motsepe League Champions: 2018–19

=== SAFA Second Division (Gauteng Stream) ===
- 2015–16 – 1st
- 2016–17 – 3rd
- 2017–18 – 2nd
- 2018–19 – 1st (promoted)

=== National First Division ===
- 2019–20 – 7th
- 2020–21 – 6th
- 2021–22 – 4th
- 2022–23 – 6th
- 2023–24 – 5th
- 2024–25 – 7th
