= Uthongathi F.C. =

Football club in the South African National First Division

Uthongathi FC
- Founded: 2014
- Ground: Princess Magogo Stadium
- Capacity: 12,000
- League: National First Division
- Website: uthongathifc.com

Uthongathi FC is a South African professional football club based in oThongathi, KwaZulu-Natal. Their current home stadium is the Princess Magogo Stadium in KwaMashu.

== History ==
The team was founded in 2014 by Nicholas Mkhize. They won the 2016–17 ABC Motsepe League and gained promotion to the National First Division via a 1-0 play-off victory in the final against Super Eagles FC. In 2018 the chairman, Nicholas Mkhize, was shot dead after the club's weekly technical meeting.

The club was sold prior to the start of the 2023–24 National First Division. Mkhize's children stated that they were devastated because they loved the team, saying it was the only thing that brought them close to their father.

== League record ==
=== National First Division ===
- 2017–18 – 11th
- 2018–19 – 5th
- 2019–20 – 6th
- 2020–21 – 11th
- 2021–22 – 8th
- 2022–23 – 7th (licence sold)
