= TS Sporting F.C. =

South African association football club

TS Sporting
- Nickname(s): Abantu Bemthetho
- Founded: 2016
- Ground: Kabokweni Stadium
- Capacity: 8,000
- Chairman: Slungu Thobela
- League: National First Division
- Website: www.tssportingfc.co.za

TS Sporting F.C. is a South African football club. The club are from Zwelisha, near Mbombela, Mpumalanga, South Africa.

The club was created when Mbombela-based lawyers purchased a SAFA Regional League license from Barberton City Stars in 2016 following City Stars' relegation from the SAFA Second Division. In turn, the City Stars purchased a license from Justicia Celtic to stay in the SAFA Second Division. TS Sporting were promoted from the SAFA Regional League in 2017 after the second-placed team were sanctioned 33 points, and TS Sporting qualified were promoted via the playoffs. The club were promoted from the SAFA Second Division in 2018 having reached the Championship final, losing 5–4 on penalties to Maccabi F.C.

They were relegated from the 2021–22 National First Division after finishing 16th.
