= Richards Bay F.C. =

- Nickname: The Natal Rich Boys
- Founded: 2017; 9 years ago
- Ground: Richards Bay Stadium, KwaZulu-Natal
- Capacity: 10,500
- Coordinates: 28.743392°S 32.055874°E
- Chairman: Jomo Biyela
- Manager: Dimitar Pantev
- League: South African Premiership
- 2025-26: 11th
colours

Richards Bay Football Club is a South African soccer club based in Richards Bay, KwaZulu-Natal, South Africa.

== History ==
The club was formed when Thanda Zulu Royal sold their club to Brian Sifiso Biyela, who renamed it Richards Bay F.C. Thanda Zulu Royal had earned promotion to the Premiership by winning the 2016–17 National First Division, but owner Pierre Delvaux sold the club's Premiership league status to fifth-placed AmaZulu

On 7 February 2021, while still in the National First Division, the club achieved their biggest win at the time when they defeated Premiership side Kaizer Chiefs 2-1, in a Nedbank Cup last 32 match.

Richards Bay earned promotion to the Premiership after winning the 2021–22 National First Division.

== League record ==
=== National First Division ===
- 2017–18 – 12th
- 2018–19 – 7th
- 2019–20 – 12th
- 2020–21 – 3rd
- 2021–22 – 1st (promoted)

=== South African Premiership ===
- 2022–23 – 13th
- 2023–24 – 15th
- 2024–25 – 8th
- 2025–26 – 11th
