= SAFA Regional League =

Hollywoodbets Regional League
- Country: South Africa
- Confederation: South African Football Association
- Divisions: 148 (2025-26)
- Level on pyramid: 4
- Feeder to: LFA Super League
- Promotion to: SAFA Second Division
- Relegation to: LFA Super League
- Sponsor(s): Hollywoodbets
- Website: www.safa.net

The SAFA Regional League, known as the Hollywoodbets Regional League for sponsorship reasons, is the fourth tier of domestic football in the South African football pyramid. It sits below the SAFA Second Division and above the LFA Super League, and is administered by the South African Football Association through its provincial and regional structures.

Each divisional league promotes its champion into inter-regional play-offs, from which teams advance to the SAFA Second Division. Most teams are made up of players under the age of 19.

Logo when it was the SAB Regional League

== History ==
The competition was previously sponsored by South African Breweries and known as the SAB Regional League. In August 2023 SAFA announced a sponsorship agreement with the betting operator Hollywoodbets, under which the competition became the Hollywoodbets Regional League.

In March 2023, the owner of the North West team Luka Ball Controllers was taken in for police questioning after allegedly paying R1000 each to five junior players from Swartruggens FC, their next opponents, to not attend the match, with the intention of winning by walkover. SAFA stated that they would convene a disciplinary hearing.

== Structure ==
The Regional League is organised as a set of independent divisional leagues rather than a single national competition. Divisions are grouped by SAFA region, and regions in turn by province. Because the number of participating clubs varies by region, larger regions are split into multiple streams or groups, each of which is a separate league with its own table.

In the 2025-26 season the competition comprised 148 divisional leagues across the nine provinces, spread over 42 SAFA regions, together with four inter-regional play-off groups.

Divisional structure, 2025-26
Province	Regions	Divisions
Limpopo	5	32
North West	4	23
Eastern Cape	7	20
KwaZulu-Natal	7	18
Mpumalanga	3	16
Northern Cape	5	14
Free State	4	11
Gauteng	5	11
Western Cape	2	3
Total	42	148

== Champions ==
Comprehensive divisional results for the Regional League are not published centrally by SAFA. The tables below are compiled from league tables recorded by the South African football statistics site Diski Zone, which holds divisional tables for the competition from the 2016-17 season onwards.

=== 2025-26 divisional champions ===
The table below lists the champion of every divisional league contested in the 2025-26 season, grouped by province and region.

==== Eastern Cape ====
Region	Division	Champion	Pld	W	D	L	GF	GA	Pts
Alfred Nzo	Alfred Nzo - Stream A	Matatiele City FC	18	14	2	2	34	10	44
Alfred Nzo	Alfred Nzo - Stream B	Young Challengers FC	18	9	9	0	34	15	36
Amathole	Amathole - Stream A	University of Fort Hare FC	8	7	1	0	29	2	22
Amathole	Amathole - Stream B	Real Stars FC	14	10	2	2	36	13	32
Amathole	Amathole - Stream C	Pk United FC	16	15	1	0	53	12	46
Amathole	Amathole - Stream D	Qumra United Professionals FC	12	11	1	0	25	4	34
Amathole	Amathole - Stream E	Musketeers FC	20	19	1	0	62	4	58
Amathole	Amathole - Stream F	Abahlobo FC	12	11	0	1	30	5	33
Amathole	Amathole - Stream G	Ligugulethu FC	15	9	2	4	36	23	29
Buffalo City	Buffalo City - Group 1A	Prides AFC	30	22	3	5	75	29	69
Joe Gqabi	Joe Gqabi - Group 1A	Sundowns FC	20	16	3	1	36	5	51
NMB	NMB - Stream A	Royal Bucks	18	11	6	1	30	6	39
NMB	NMB - Stream B	Major Chiefs	18	15	1	2	55	12	46
OR Tambo	OR Tambo - Coastal Stream	Port Saint Giants	12	6	5	1	19	7	23
OR Tambo	OR Tambo - Inland Stream	United FC	16	12	2	2	37	7	38
Sarah Baartman	Sarah Baartman - Stream A	Super Stars FC	18	13	1	4	40	19	40
Sarah Baartman	Sarah Baartman - Stream B	Wits	16	13	1	2	52	9	40
Sarah Baartman	Sarah Baartman - Stream C	United Brothers FC	18	11	5	2	28	16	38
Sarah Baartman	Sarah Baartman - Stream D	Real Crusaders Football Club	16	13	2	1	40	13	41

==== Free State ====
Region	Division	Champion	Pld	W	D	L	GF	GA	Pts
Fezile Dabi	Fezile Dabi - Group 1A	Nicaragua FC	16	12	0	4	33	8	36
Fezile Dabi	Fezile Dabi - Group 1B	Elite Athletic FC	16	11	4	1	38	11	37
Lejweleputswa	Lejweleputswa - Group 1A	City Rangers FC	16	12	3	1	40	14	39
Lejweleputswa	Lejweleputswa - Group 1B	Harmony FC	14	9	4	1	28	12	31
Mangaung	Mangaung - Group 1A Bloemfontein	Classic XI FC	30	28	1	1	111	33	85
Mangaung	Mangaung - Group 1B Thaba Nchu	Black Eagles FC	22	16	4	2	57	25	52
Mangaung	Mangaung - Group 1C Botshabelo	Junior Birds FC	26	20	5	1	55	7	65
Mangaung	Mangaung - Group 1D R702 Dewetsdorp & Wepener	Morojaneng United FC	14	11	2	1	41	10	35
Thabo Mofutsanyana	Thabo Mofutsanyana - N3 Stream	Harrismith Aces FC	14	8	4	2	31	22	28
Thabo Mofutsanyana	Thabo Mofutsanyana - N5 Stream	Juventus FC	14	10	0	4	37	23	30
Thabo Mofutsanyana	Thabo Mofutsanyana - R26 Stream	Hackette Vultures FC	12	9	1	2	27	12	28

==== Gauteng ====
Region	Division	Champion	Pld	W	D	L	GF	GA	Pts
Ekurhuleni	Ekurhuleni - Stream A	Benoni City United FC	34	22	5	7	80	35	71
Ekurhuleni	Ekurhuleni - Stream B	Highlands Park	30	28	1	1	87	8	85
Johannesburg	Johannesburg - Blue	Mphehli All Stars	34	29	1	4	118	22	88
Johannesburg	Johannesburg - Green	1809 FC	34	25	5	4	71	24	80
Johannesburg	Johannesburg - Orange	Lesco FC	26	20	2	4	90	31	62
Johannesburg	Johannesburg - Yellow	Rangers FC	34	26	4	4	104	40	82
Sedibeng	Sedibeng	Boipatong Football Club	32	24	5	3	88	26	77
Tshwane	Tshwane - Stream A	Mamelodi All Stars FC	10	10	0	0	27	7	30
Tshwane	Tshwane - Stream B	Spartans FC	11	10	1	0	22	4	31
West Rand	West Rand - Stream A	Doornkop Students	18	14	3	1	56	12	45
West Rand	West Rand - Stream B	Sk Nations FC	26	21	3	2	80	21	66

==== KwaZulu-Natal ====
Region	Division	Champion	Pld	W	D	L	GF	GA	Pts
Amajuba	Amajuba - Stream A	Happy Crown FC	22	15	5	2	50	18	50
Amajuba	Amajuba - Stream B	Revolution FC	16	9	4	3	26	10	31
Ethekwini	Ethekwini - Stream A	Golden Arrows	30	22	5	3	48	15	71
Ethekwini	Ethekwini - Stream B	Cherrians FC	30	23	1	6	71	26	70
Harry Gwala	Harry Gwala - Group 1A	Blackpool FC	14	11	2	1	34	16	35
Harry Gwala	Harry Gwala - Group 1B	Kr Arsenal	12	9	2	1	18	6	29
King Cetshwayo	King Cetshwayo - Stream A	Happy Stars FC	30	23	3	4	55	26	72
King Cetshwayo	King Cetshwayo - Stream B	Unizulu FC	24	19	2	3	48	12	59
King Cetshwayo	King Cetshwayo - Stream C 1	Eshowe Citizen FC	0	0	0	0	0	0	0
King Cetshwayo	King Cetshwayo - Stream C2	9.9 Junior FC	0	0	0	0	0	0	0
Umgungundlovu	Umgungundlovu - Play-Offs	Celtic United	3	2	0	1	2	2	6
Umgungundlovu	Umgungundlovu - Stream A	Celtic United	22	15	6	1	49	14	51
Umgungundlovu	Umgungundlovu - Stream B	Midlands Academy FC	20	14	1	5	38	20	43
Umgungundlovu	Umgungundlovu - Stream C	Maqongqo City	22	13	7	2	45	21	46
Umgungundlovu	Umgungundlovu - Stream D	Dargle United FC	22	15	7	0	55	18	52
Umzinyathi	Umzinyathi - Stream A	Dundee United FC	0	0	0	0	0	0	0
Umzinyathi	Umzinyathi - Stream B	Flyers FC	0	0	0	0	0	0	0
Uthukela	Uthukela - Stream A	Ladysmith Juventus FC	30	28	1	1	94	14	85

==== Limpopo ====
Region	Division	Champion	Pld	W	D	L	GF	GA	Pts
Capricorn	Capricorn - Stream A1	Avon Psg FC	13	9	3	1	62	15	30
Capricorn	Capricorn - Stream A2	Mighty Killers FC	8	6	0	2	20	9	18
Capricorn	Capricorn - Stream B	Seomong Jumbers	14	11	3	0	39	7	36
Capricorn	Capricorn - Stream C1	Mapesa Football Club	21	15	5	1	45	14	50
Capricorn	Capricorn - Stream C2	Star Sign FC	19	14	3	2	41	12	45
Capricorn	Capricorn - Stream D1	Phinnet City FC	18	16	1	0	51	10	49
Capricorn	Capricorn - Stream D2	Mandebele Happy Boys FC	14	13	1	0	42	7	40
Mopani	Mopani - Baobab Stream	FC Rellen	28	26	0	2	69	9	78
Mopani	Mopani - Marula Stream	MJM Hotspurs FC	24	22	2	0	76	7	68
Mopani	Mopani - Molototsi Stream	Nhlahla Northern Bucs FC	20	14	5	1	38	4	47
Mopani	Mopani - Tropical Stream	Bakgaga United FC	28	23	4	1	62	9	73
Mopani	Mopani - Zebra Stream	Gawula Classic FC	30	21	7	2	67	17	70
Sekhukhune	Sekhukhune - Stream A	Seokodibeng Vultures	32	25	7	0	64	11	82
Sekhukhune	Sekhukhune - Stream B	The Masters Sports Academy	30	25	5	0	78	22	80
Sekhukhune	Sekhukhune - Stream C	Matsebeng Real Hearts FC	22	21	1	0	55	8	64
Sekhukhune	Sekhukhune - Stream D	Tsa Saboshego FC	26	24	1	1	75	10	73
Sekhukhune	Sekhukhune - Stream E	Moganyaka-mighty Blues FC	20	19	0	1	59	8	57
Sekhukhune	Sekhukhune - Stream F	Zebras FC	20	17	3	0	55	12	54
Vhembe	Vhembe - Stream A	Ntsemi	32	24	5	3	57	15	77
Vhembe	Vhembe - Stream B	Mahagala Young Stars	40	33	4	3	90	20	103
Vhembe	Vhembe - Stream C	Saudi FC	34	25	3	6	74	24	78
Vhembe	Vhembe - Stream D	Ndiitwani Shooting Stars	42	34	4	4	79	29	106
Vhembe	Vhembe - Stream E	Ramahantsha Blackpool FC	34	24	10	0	85	18	82
Vhembe	Vhembe - Stream F	Mukondeni Royal FC	30	23	6	1	74	10	75
Vhembe	Vhembe - Stream G	Maelula United Brothers FC	42	38	1	3	102	15	115
Vhembe	Vhembe - Stream H	Berea FC	30	26	4	0	67	16	82
Vhembe	Vhembe - Stream I	Abc FC	44	40	4	0	106	15	124
Vhembe	Vhembe - Stream J	FC Basel	30	27	3	0	113	8	84
Waterberg	Waterberg - Play-Offs	SUNRISE LITE FC	4	3	1	0	15	3	10
Waterberg	Waterberg - Stream A	Sporting FC	16	9	4	3	24	11	31
Waterberg	Waterberg - Stream B	Bakwena FC	8	8	0	0	30	2	24
Waterberg	Waterberg - Stream C	Sun Rise Lite FC	8	7	0	1	30	13	21

==== Mpumalanga ====
Region	Division	Champion	Pld	W	D	L	GF	GA	Pts
Ehlanzeni	Ehlanzeni - Kruger 1	Bakoena Chiefs FC	34	30	4	0	69	4	94
Ehlanzeni	Ehlanzeni - Kruger 2	Edinburg United	34	22	10	2	59	18	76
Ehlanzeni	Ehlanzeni - Kruger 3	Bayern FC	20	17	2	1	61	15	53
Ehlanzeni	Ehlanzeni - Mgwenya 1	Bazooka XI FC	34	24	4	6	61	24	76
Ehlanzeni	Ehlanzeni - Mgwenya 2	Mashaba United FC	32	18	11	3	47	19	65
Gert Sibande	Gert Sibande - Stream A	Onpoint FC	22	12	6	2	34	15	42
Gert Sibande	Gert Sibande - Stream B	Somhlolo United	26	20	5	1	44	17	65
Gert Sibande	Gert Sibande - Stream C	Ravens FC	28	20	7	1	52	18	67
Gert Sibande	Gert Sibande - Stream D	Mjali All Stars	20	16	4	0	70	16	52
Nkangala	Nkangala - Group 1A	Botleng United FC	18	13	2	2	37	8	41
Nkangala	Nkangala - Group 1B A	Chakalaka	14	12	0	2	33	13	36
Nkangala	Nkangala - Group 1B B	Emalahleni United FC	14	10	1	3	25	13	31
Nkangala	Nkangala - Group 1C	Phaphama Football Club	18	14	2	1	37	9	44
Nkangala	Nkangala - Group 1D	No Fear FC	18	15	1	2	50	14	46
Nkangala	Nkangala - Group 1E	Malombo Royals FC	30	24	4	2	89	29	76
Nkangala	Nkangala - Group 1F	Amajali FC	0	0	0	0	0	0	0

==== North West ====
Region	Division	Champion	Pld	W	D	L	GF	GA	Pts
Bojanala	Bojanala - Stream A1	Mathibestad Romans FC	12	9	2	1	25	6	29
Bojanala	Bojanala - Stream A2	Maximum FC	8	5	1	2	25	11	16
Bojanala	Bojanala - Stream B1	Brits Special Force FC	20	17	3	0	63	11	54
Bojanala	Bojanala - Stream B2	Dream Team FC	30	23	6	1	49	12	75
Bojanala	Bojanala - Stream C1	khuseleka All Stars fc	26	19	3	4	72	31	60
Bojanala	Bojanala - Stream C2	Debunkers FC	24	20	1	3	63	21	61
Bojanala	Bojanala - Stream D	Swartruggens United FC	20	14	4	2	46	18	46
Bojanala	Bojanala - Stream E1	Bakgatla Football Club	14	12	1	1	39	10	37
Bojanala	Bojanala - Stream E2	Pella Crocodile FC	16	10	4	2	26	12	34
Dr Kenneth Kaunda	Dr Kenneth Kaunda - Stream A	Wollies Academy	24	20	2	2	47	10	62
Dr Kenneth Kaunda	Dr Kenneth Kaunda - Stream B	Golden Palace FC	22	17	2	3	79	27	53
Dr Kenneth Kaunda	Dr Kenneth Kaunda - Stream C	Kanana Rybakina FC	22	18	3	1	72	12	57
Dr Kenneth Kaunda	Dr Kenneth Kaunda - Stream D	Rising Stars Academy	20	17	3	0	53	14	54
Dr Kenneth Kaunda	Dr Kenneth Kaunda - Stream E	Ikageng Giants FC	20	18	0	2	71	18	54
Dr Ruth Segomotsi Mompati	Dr Ruth Segomotsi Mompati - Stream A1	Brazil FC	18	13	3	2	46	20	42
Dr Ruth Segomotsi Mompati	Dr Ruth Segomotsi Mompati - Stream A2	Mogopela Wonderous	20	18	2	0	56	13	56
Dr Ruth Segomotsi Mompati	Dr Ruth Segomotsi Mompati - stream B1	Keleku	12	8	2	2	33	21	26
Dr Ruth Segomotsi Mompati	Dr Ruth Segomotsi Mompati - Stream B2	Barcelona FC	14	9	2	3	36	22	29
Ngaka Modiri Molema	Ngaka Modiri Molema - Stream A	Bonca Dortmond FC	24	20	1	2	95	29	61
Ngaka Modiri Molema	Ngaka Modiri Molema - Stream B	Mafikeng Rocks	18	13	4	1	53	17	43
Ngaka Modiri Molema	Ngaka Modiri Molema - Stream C	Soccer Institute	20	15	3	2	67	16	48
Ngaka Modiri Molema	Ngaka Modiri Molema - Stream D	Eleven Experience FC	18	15	3	0	39	14	48
Ngaka Modiri Molema	Ngaka Modiri Molema - Stream E	Try Again FC	14	11	2	1	44	17	35

==== Northern Cape ====
Region	Division	Champion	Pld	W	D	L	GF	GA	Pts
Frances Baard	Frances Baard - Stream A	Dalton Brothers FC	26	16	6	4	62	28	54
Frances Baard	Frances Baard - Stream B	FC Barcelona	18	13	4	1	40	16	43
Frances Baard	Frances Baard - Stream C	Pampierstad Express FC	20	15	4	1	47	10	49
John Taolo Gaetsewe	John Taolo Gaetsewe - Eastern Stream	Red Devils FC	16	12	3	1	49	17	39
John Taolo Gaetsewe	John Taolo Gaetsewe - Northern Stream	Kuruman Kicks FC	16	12	2	2	33	11	38
John Taolo Gaetsewe	John Taolo Gaetsewe - West Stream	FC United	16	12	2	2	46	19	38
Namakwa	Namakwa - Stream A	Heroes FC	16	11	4	1	32	8	37
Namakwa	Namakwa - Stream B	Osk Eagles FC	16	9	4	3	40	20	31
Pixley ka Seme	Pixley ka Seme - Stream A	Wafa FC	14	8	3	3	23	16	27
Pixley ka Seme	Pixley ka Seme - Stream B	Blue Birds	10	6	2	2	18	10	20
Pixley ka Seme	Pixley ka Seme - Stream C	Hanover Rovers FC	14	8	3	3	44	34	27
ZF Mgcawu	ZF Mgcawu - Dawid Kruiper	Black Cats	20	14	5	1	53	26	47
ZF Mgcawu	ZF Mgcawu - Kai Garib	Grootdrink Sundowns FC	18	11	4	3	48	22	37
ZF Mgcawu	ZF Mgcawu - West	Birds United FC	18	13	4	1	55	25	43

==== Western Cape ====
Region	Division	Champion	Pld	W	D	L	GF	GA	Pts
Cape Town	Cape Town	Saxon Rovers FC	34	24	6	4	72	33	78
Winelands	Winelands - Stream A	FC Kayamandi	3	2	1	0	16	2	7
Winelands	Winelands - Stream B	Worcester City FC	3	2	1	0	7	3	7

=== Inter-regional play-offs ===
Divisional champions enter inter-regional play-offs to determine promotion to the SAFA Second Division.

Season	Play-off group	Winner	Pts
2025-26	Limpopo	Abc FC	10
2025-26	Group 1B	Elite Athletics FC	4
2025-26	Group 1A	Mkabadeli Heroes FC	6
2023-24	Gauteng	Eersterus Rams Football Club	10

=== Divisions by season ===
Season	Divisions with a recorded champion
2026-27	8
2025-26	150
2024-25	76
2023-24	44
2022-23	41
2021-22	35
2020-21	24
2019-20	44
2018-19	18
2017-18	14
2016-17	6

== Promotion ==
Divisional champions do not promote directly. Champions enter inter-regional play-offs, and the winners of those play-offs advance to the SAFA Second Division, the third tier of the South African pyramid.

== See also ==
- Football in South Africa
- South African football league system
- SAFA Second Division
- LFA Super League
