= Athlone Stadium =

Stadium in Athlone on the Cape Flats in Cape Town, South Africa

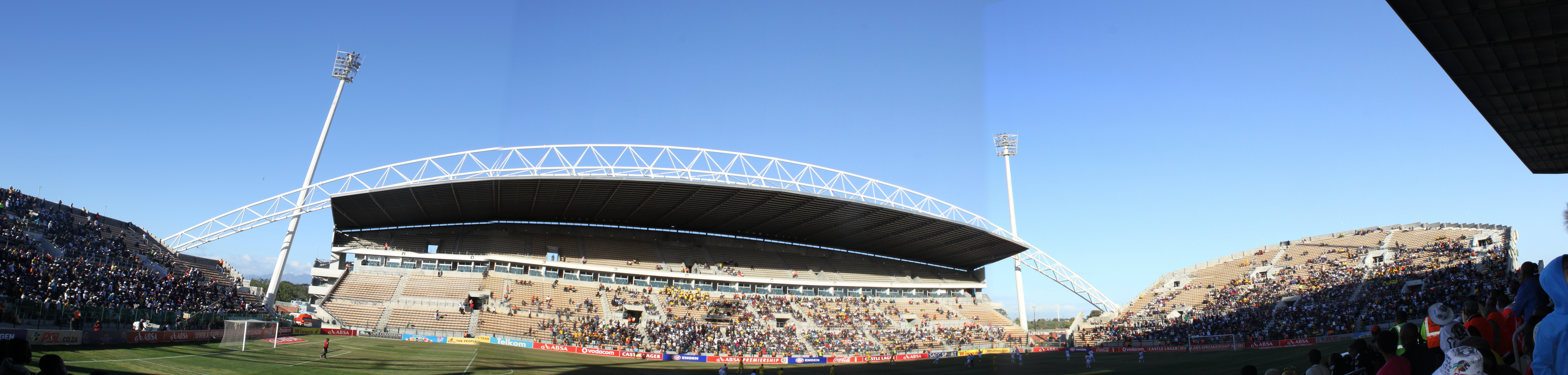
- Interactive map of Athlone Stadium
- Full name: Athlone Stadium
- Location: Cross Boulevard, Athlone, Cape Town, South Africa
- Coordinates: 33°57′43.14″S 18°31′02.33″E
- Owner: City of Cape Town
- Capacity: 34,000
- Surface: Grass

Construction
- Opened: 1972

Tenant
- Cape Town City

The Athlone Stadium is a stadium in Athlone on the Cape Flats in Cape Town, South Africa. It is used mostly for soccer matches, but is sometimes used for Currie Cup rugby matches. The stadium holds 34,000 people and it was built in 1972.

The stadium was upgraded in the lead up to the 2010 FIFA World Cup with the intention of using it as a training venue. The estimated cost of the upgrade was R297 million.
