= List of Ajax Cape Town F.C. players =

This list includes past footballers who have played for Ajax Cape Town F.C. from 11 January 1999 to 28 September 2020.

== List of players ==
For the current squad, see Ajax Cape Town#Current squad.

Name	Nationality	Position	Ajax CT career	Captaincy	Notes
Ali Abondo	Kenya	Midfielder	2016–present	—	
George Akpabio	Nigeria	Forward	2012–2014	—	^{[1]}
Cole Alexander	South Africa	Midfielder	2008–2014	—	^{[2]}
Nazeer Allie	South Africa	Defender	2005–2015	—	
Bradley August	South Africa	Forward	2002–2005	—	
Brendan Augustine	South Africa	Midfielder	1999–2001	—	
Dikilu Bageta	Democratic Republic of the Congo	Defender	2003–2005; 2006–2008	—	
Khama Billiat	Zimbabwe	Midfielder	2010–2013	—	
Matthew Booth	South Africa / England	Defender	2011–2013	—	
Mario Booysen	South Africa	Defender	2007–2011	—	^{[3]}
Rolf de Boer	Netherlands	Midfielder	1999–2000	—	
Geert Brusselers	Netherlands	Midfielder	2001–2002	—	
Danzyl Bruwer	Namibia	Goalkeeper	2008–2009	—	
Franklin Cale	South Africa	Forward	2004–2009; 2013–present	—	
Brent Carelse	South Africa	Midfielder	2001–2007; 2011	—	^{[4]}
Martin Carelse	South Africa	Defender	2008–2009	—	
Morgan Cathey	United States	Goalkeeper	2007–2008	—	
Thomas Chideu	Zimbabwe	Forward	2015–present	—	
Erick Chipeta	Zimbabwe	Defender	2016–present	—	
Daylon Claasen	South Africa	Midfielder	2006–2008	—	
Antonio Correia	Angola	Forward	2011	—	
Clayton Daniels	South Africa	Defender	2006–2011	—	
Lance Davids	South Africa	Defender	2009–2010; 2013–2015	—	
Derek Decamps	France	Defender	2009–2011	—	
Mohammed Diallo	Côte d'Ivoire	Midfielder	2009–2010	—	
Floris Diergaardt	Namibia	Forward	2000–2001	—	
Edelbert Dinha	Zimbabwe	Midfielder	1999–2002	—	
Keagan Dolly	South Africa	Midfielder	2012–2015	—	
Sameehg Doutie	South Africa	Forward	2007–2011	—	
Eyong Enoh	Cameroon	Midfielder	2007–2008	—	
Brett Evans	South Africa	Defender	1999–2012	2004–2011	
Thembinkosi Fanteni	South Africa	Forward	2005–2008; 2010–2012	—	
Jody February	South Africa	Goalkeeper	2017–present	—	
Eduardo Ferreira	Brazil	Defender	2007–2009	—	
Taariq Fielies	South Africa	Defender	2012–2013	—	
Nathan Gertse	South Africa	Defender	2011–2013	—	^{[5]}
Alcardo van Graan	South Africa	Forward	2011–2013	—	^{[6]}
Travis Graham	South Africa	Midfielder	2012–present	2016–present	
Bradley Grobler	South Africa	Forward	2012–2013	—	
Chad Harpur	South Africa	Goalkeeper	2009–2010	—	
Anathi Ashley Sobekiwe	South Africa	Midfielder	2008-2016	—	
Rowan Hendricks	South Africa	Midfielder	2001–2002	—	
Thulani Hlatshwayo	South Africa	Defender	2009–2014	—	
Grant Igesund	South Africa	Forward	2002-2005		
Dominic Isaacs	South Africa	Defender	1999–2008; 2013–2015	—	
Erwin Isaacs	South Africa	Forward	2015–present	—	
Deniss Ivanovs	Latvia	Defender	2009–2010	—	
Anssi Jaakkola	Finland	Goalkeeper	2013–present	—	
Quinton Jacobs	Namibia	Midfielder	2005–2006	—	
Aidan Jenniker	South Africa	Defender	2007–present	—	^{[7]}
Moeneeb Josephs	South Africa	Goalkeeper	1999–2006	—	
Roderick Kabwe	Zambia	Midfielder	2017–present	—	
David Kannemeyer	South Africa	Defender	1999–2001	—	
Edzai Kasinauyo	Zimbabwe	Midfielder	2000–2001; 2002–2003	—	
Willard Katsande	Zimbabwe	Midfielder	2010–2011	—	
Mabhuti Khenyeza	South Africa	Forward	2008–2009; 2013	—	
Salmaan King	South Africa	Forward	2003–2005	—	
Christos Kostis	Greece	Forward	2006–2007	—	
Ritus Krjauklis	Latvia	Defender	2013–2014	—	
Koen van de Laak	Netherlands	Midfielder	2012–2014	—	
Lawrence Lartey	Ghana	Defender	2015–present	—	
Mosa Lebusa	South Africa	Defender	2012–present	—	
Duncan Lechesa	South Africa	Midfielder	2001–2004	—	
Stanton Lewis	South Africa	Forward	2005–2006; 2009–2011	—	^{[8]}
Cecil Lolo	South Africa	Defender	2009–2015	—	^{[9]}
Toriq Losper	South Africa	Midfielder	2011–present	—	
Abel Mabaso	South Africa	Defender	2015–2016	—	
Hillary Makasa	Zambia	Defender	1999–2001	—	
George Maluleka	South Africa	Midfielder	2009–2012	—	
Lebogang Manyama	South Africa	Midfielder	2010–2013	—	
Norman Mapeza	Zimbabwe	Midfielder	2005–2006	—	
Calvin Marlin	South Africa	Goalkeeper	1999–2003	—	
Lizo Mjempu	South Africa	Defender	2010–2011	—	
George Mofokeng	South Africa	Defender	2005–2006	—	
Thato Mokeke	South Africa	Midfielder	2010–2014	—	
Tsweu Mokoro	South Africa	Midfielder	2008–2009	—	
Bryce Moon	South Africa	Defender	2005–2008	—	
Thierry Mouyouma	Gabon	Forward	2005–2006	—	
Cyrille Mubiala Kitambala	Democratic Republic of the Congo	Defender	2004–2006	—	
Wilfred Mugeyi	Zimbabwe	Forward	2003–2006	—	^{[M]}
Clifford Mulenga	Zambia / South Africa	Midfielder	2014–2015	—	
Russell Mwafulirwa	Malawi	Forward	2006–2008	—	
Abia Nale	South Africa	Midfielder	2013	—	^{[10]}
Robert Nauseb	Namibia	Midfielder	2002–2004	—	^{[11]}
Milton Ncube	Zimbabwe	Defender	2014–2016	—	
Tendai Ndoro	Zimbabwe	Forward	2018–present	—	
Stefan van Neel	South Africa	Goalkeeper	2012–2014	—	
Robin Ngalande	Malawi	Forward	2014–2015	—	^{[12]}
Clifford Ngobeni	South Africa	Midfielder	2005–2010	—	
Ashley Opperman	South Africa	Defender	2000–2005	—	^{[13]}
Soumaila Ouattara	Burkina Faso	Defender	2017–present	—	
Nathan Paulse	South Africa	Forward	2000–2001; 2002–2008; 2010	—	^{[14]}
Brandon Peterson	South Africa	Goalkeeper	2013–present	—	
Andre Petim	South Africa	Goalkeeper	2004–present	—	^{[15]}
Alfred Phiri	South Africa	Midfielder	2003–2005	—	
Steven Pienaar	South Africa	Midfielder	1999–2001	—	
Shane Poggenpoel	South Africa	Midfielder	2001–2006	—	
Sean Roberts	South Africa / England	Goalkeeper	2008–2014	—	
Eleazar Rodgers	South Africa	Forward	2013–2014	—	^{[16]}
Tafadzwa Rusike	Zimbabwe	Forward	2010–2013	—	
Noah Sadaoui	Morocco / United States	Midfielder	2014–2015	—	
Ibrahim Somé Salombo	Democratic Republic of the Congo	Forward	2005–2006	—	
Roberto Santo	South Africa	Forward	2006–2008	—	
Shane Saraline	Ghana	Defender	2017–present	—	
Carlo Scott	South Africa	Forward	1999–2004	—	
Granwald Scott	South Africa	Midfielder	2004–2016	2011–2016	
Dipsy Selolwane	Botswana	Forward	2008–2010	—	
Thulani Serero	South Africa	Midfielder	2008–2011	—	
Nhlanhla Shabalala	South Africa	Midfielder	2003–2013	—	
Sici Shelembe	South Africa	Midfielder	2011–2013	—	^{[17]}
Dillon Sheppard	South Africa	Forward	1999–2004	—	
Mfundo Shumana	South Africa	Midfielder	2004–2009; 2011–2014	—	^{[18]}
Diyo Sibisi	South Africa	Forward	2009–2011	—	^{[18]}
Simba Sithole	Zimbabwe	Forward	2013–2014	—	
Mkhanyiseli Siwahla	South Africa	Midfielder	2004–2010	—	
Seydouba Soumah	Guinea	Midfielder	2010–2011	—	^{[19]}
Gerald Takwara	Zimbabwe	Midfielder	2017–present	—	
Telinho	Mozambique	Midfielder	2013–2014	—	
Tsholola Tshinyama	Democratic Republic of the Congo	Midfielder	2003–2007	—	
Ndumiso Vasi	South Africa	Midfielder	2012–2014	—	
Nhlanhla Vilakazi	South Africa	Forward	2010–2013	—	
Marciano Vink	Netherlands / Suriname	Midfielder	1999–2000	—	
Hans Vonk	South Africa / Netherlands	Goalkeeper	2006–2008; 2009–2011	—	
Wanderson	Brazil	Forward	2012–2013	—	
Sander Westerveld	Netherlands	Goalkeeper	2011–2013	—	
Kamogelo Wolff	South Africa	Midfielder	2011–2013	—	
Yannick Zakri	Ivory Coast	Forward	2018	—	

== Ajax Cape Town players on international cups ==
Cup	Players
(Ghana) (Nigeria) 2000 Africa Cup of Nations	(Zambia) Hillary Makasa
(Mali) 2002 Africa Cup of Nations	(South Africa) David Kannemeyer (South Africa) Dillon Sheppard
(South Korea) (Japan) 2002 FIFA World Cup	(South Africa) Calvin Marlin
(Tunisia) 2004 Africa Cup of Nations	(Democratic Republic of the Congo) Cyrille Mubiala Kitambala (Zimbabwe) Wilfred Mugeyi
(Egypt) 2006 Africa Cup of Nations	(South Africa) Moeneeb Josephs (Democratic Republic of the Congo) Cyrille Mubiala Kitambala (Democratic Republic of the Congo) Tsholola Tshinyama
(Ghana) 2008 Africa Cup of Nations	(South Africa) Brett Evans (South Africa) Bryce Moon
(South Africa) 2010 FIFA World Cup	(South Africa) Lance Davids
(Equatorial Guinea) 2015 Africa Cup of Nations	(South Africa) Rivaldo Coetzee

== Notes ==
M. ^{a} Player who later managed the club.

1. George Akpabio was playing for Vasco da Gama on loan for the 2012–2013 season, and Chippa United for the 2013–2014 season.

2. Cole Alexander played for Vasco da Gama on loan for the 2010–2011 season, and Chippa United in 2012–13.

3. Mario Booysen played for Bloemfontein Celtic on loan in 2009, Maritzburg United on loan for the 2009–2010 season, and SuperSport United on loan in 2011, leaving Ajax CT after his loan spell.

4. Brent Carelse played for Ajax Cape Town from 2001 to 2007, and was loaned to Ajax Cape Town from SuperSport United in 2011.

5. Nathan Gertse played for Ajax Cape Town starting in 2011, in the winter of 2012 he was loaned to Vasco da Gama for six months, and the loan was then extended for another year.

5. Alcardo van Graan was loaned to Milano United in January 2013 on a six-month loan, where he is currently active.

6. Aidan Jenniker played for Vasco da Gama on loan during the 2010–2011 season, before returning to Ajax CT where he still active.

7. Stanton Lewis played for Ajax Cape Town from 2005 to 2006, and was loaned to Ajax Cape Town from Ajax Amsterdam for the 2009–2010 season, signing with Ajax CT who loaned him to Kaizer Chiefs in 2011.

8. Cecil Lolo played for iKapa Sporting on loan for the 2009–2010 season, returning to Ajax Cape Town, where he is currently active, after his loan period.

9. Abia Nale played for Ajax Cape Town on loan from Kaizer Chiefs in 2013, where he is currently active.

10. Robert Nauseb played for Bloemfontein Celtic on loan in 2004, before leaving Ajax Cape Town after his loan spell.

11. Ashley Opperman played for Avendale Athletico on a loan from 2002 to 2003, before returning to Ajax CT for two more seasons.

12. Robin Ngalande was loaned to Ajax Cape Town from Bidvest Wits in 2014, leaving Ajax Cape Town after his loan spell.

13. Nathan Paulse was loaned to Ajax Cape Town from Hammarby IF in 2010, leaving Ajax Cape Town after his loan spell.

14. Andre Petim was loaned to Golden Arrows for the 2012–2013 season, where he is currently on loan.

15. Mfundo Shumana was loaned to Chippa United on loan during the 2012–13 season, returning to Ajax CT after his loan spell.

16. Eleazar Rodgers was loaned to Ajax Cape Town from Mamelodi Sundowns in 2013, where he is currently active.

17. Sici Shelembe is playing for Vasco da Gama on loan for the 2012–2013 season, where he is currently active.

18. Diyo Sibisi played for Maritzburg United on loan during the 2010–2011 season, leaving Ajax CT after his loan spell.

19. Seydouba Soumah played for iKapa Sporting on a loan from 2008 to 2009, and F.C. Cape Town from 2009 to 2010, before making his senior debut for Ajax CT the next year.

20. Corburn Woodington played for Ajax Cape Town and Supersport United 2005 to 2010. Trialist for FCStrausburg in France and Ajax Amsterdam
