= 2003–04 National First Division =

South African soccer season

National First Division
- Season: 2003–04
- Champions: Bush Bucks (Coastal); Bloemfontein Celtic (Inland)
- Promoted: Bush Bucks, Bloemfontein Celtic

The 2003–04 National First Division was the 8th season of the National First Division, the second tier of South African soccer.

It consisted of two streams, an Inland stream of 16 teams, and a Coastal stream of 14 teams. Fourteen teams were relegated as a result of the 2004–05 National First Division combining the two streams into a single national league.

The Coastal stream was won by Bush Bucks and the Inland stream by Bloemfontein Celtic, with both earning promotion to the 2004–05 Premier Soccer League.

== Coastal stream ==
=== League table ===
Pos	Team	Pld	W	D	L	GF	GA	GD	Pts	Promotion, qualification or relegation
1	Bush Bucks (C, P)	26	16	7	3	48	26	+22	55	Promoted to 2004–05 Premier Soccer League
2	Avendale Athletico	26	14	5	7	47	36	+11	47	
3	Durban Stars	26	12	6	8	38	27	+11	42	
4	FC Fortune	26	12	5	9	51	30	+21	41	
5	Vasco Da Gama	26	11	8	7	40	35	+5	41	
6	Maritzburg United	26	12	4	10	38	36	+2	40	
7	Basotho Tigers	26	12	4	10	39	30	+9	40	
8	Uthukela	26	11	5	10	44	39	+5	38	
9	Park United (R)	26	10	6	10	32	29	+3	36	Relegation to 2004–05 SAFA Second Division
10	Rainbow Stars (R)	26	10	6	10	40	41	−1	36	Relegation to 2004–05 SAFA Second Division
11	Maritzburg City (R)	26	9	8	9	41	33	+8	35	Relegation to 2004–05 SAFA Second Division
12	Premier United (R)	26	10	2	14	42	40	+2	32	Relegation to 2004–05 SAFA Second Division
13	African Wanderers (R)	26	5	2	19	24	63	−39	17	Relegation to 2004–05 SAFA Second Division
14	Blackburn Rovers (R)	26	4	0	22	22	81	−59	12	Relegation to 2004–05 SAFA Second Division

(C) Champions; (P) Promoted; (R) Relegated

== Inland stream ==
=== League table ===
Pos	Team	Pld	W	D	L	GF	GA	GD	Pts	Promotion, qualification or relegation
1	Bloemfontein Celtic (C, P)	30	22	4	4	63	22	+41	70	Promoted to 2004–05 Premier Soccer League
2	Free State Stars	30	19	3	8	48	29	+19	60	
3	Pietersburg Pillars	30	17	7	6	50	28	+22	58	
4	Bloemfontein Young Tigers	30	18	4	8	46	24	+22	58	
5	Mabopane Young Masters	30	15	5	10	47	38	+9	50	
6	Winners Park	30	14	7	9	44	39	+5	49	
7	Dangerous Darkies	30	13	6	11	42	32	+10	45	
8	Tembisa Classic	30	12	9	9	45	37	+8	45	
9	Dobsonville All Nations (R)	30	12	8	10	47	40	+7	44	Relegation to 2004–05 SAFA Second Division
10	Welkom Stars (R)	30	12	6	12	39	38	+1	42	Relegation to 2004–05 SAFA Second Division
11	Ledwaba Power Stars (R)	30	12	2	16	36	47	−11	38	Relegation to 2004–05 SAFA Second Division
12	Peoples Bank Spurs (R)	30	8	12	10	37	35	+2	36	Relegation to 2004–05 SAFA Second Division
13	FC Sporting (R)	30	6	6	18	30	59	−29	24	Relegation to 2004–05 SAFA Second Division
14	Sporting (R)	30	5	8	17	20	56	−36	23	Relegation to 2004–05 SAFA Second Division
15	Alexandra United (R)	30	4	6	20	23	44	−21	18	Relegation to 2004–05 SAFA Second Division
16	City Sharks (R)	30	3	3	24	22	71	−49	12	Relegation to 2004–05 SAFA Second Division

(C) Champions; (P) Promoted; (R) Relegated
