= 1997–98 National First Division =

South African soccer season

National First Division
- Season: 1997–98
- Champions: Dynamos (Inland); Seven Stars (Coastal)
- Promoted: Dynamos, Seven Stars

The 1997–98 National First Division was the 2nd season of the second tier of South African soccer since the reorganisation in 1996.

With a new sponsor, United Bank, the number of stream was cut from four to two, an Inland stream and a Coastal stream of 20 teams each.

The Coastal stream was won by Dynamos and the Inland stream by Seven Stars, with both earning promotion to the 1998–99 Premier Soccer League.

The number of teams was again reduced at the end of the season, with the Coastal stream being reduced to 14 teams, and the Inland stream to 16 teams, in the 1998–99 season.

== Coastal stream ==
=== League table ===
Pos	Team	Pld	W	D	L	GF	GA	GD	Pts	Promotion, qualification or relegation
1	Seven Stars (C, P)	38	30	8	0	94	16	+78	98	Promoted to 1998–99 Premiership
2	Michau Warriors	38	29	7	2	93	24	+69	94	
3	Wynberg St Johns	38	20	9	9	66	31	+35	69	
4	Saxon Rovers	38	19	8	11	82	55	+27	65	
5	Golden Arrows	38	17	12	9	55	42	+13	63	
6	Avendale Athletico	38	17	10	11	67	45	+22	61	
7	Park United	38	15	13	10	57	43	+14	58	
8	Royal Tigers	38	17	7	14	60	57	+3	58	
9	Milano	38	14	11	13	58	49	+9	53	
10	Trinitarians	38	14	9	15	45	57	−12	51	
11	Bush Bucks	38	13	9	16	39	54	−15	48	
12	Vasco da Gama	38	11	14	13	57	55	+2	47	
13	FN Rangers	38	13	8	17	47	57	−10	47	
14	Maritzburg United	38	12	6	20	67	98	−31	42	
15	Blackburn Rovers (R)	38	10	11	17	28	46	−18	41	Relegated to 1998–99 SAFA Second Division
16	Leeds United (R)	38	10	10	18	52	79	−27	40	Relegated to 1998–99 SAFA Second Division
17	Newcastle Blizzards (R)	38	8	13	17	41	62	−21	37	Relegated to 1998–99 SAFA Second Division
18	Mitchells Plain United (R)	38	6	8	24	31	65	−34	26	Relegated to 1998–99 SAFA Second Division
19	Stanger United (R)	38	4	11	23	30	84	−54	23	Relegated to 1998–99 SAFA Second Division
20	Blues United (R)	38	4	10	24	34	97	−63	22	Relegated to 1998–99 SAFA Second Division

(C) Champions; (P) Promoted; (R) Relegated

== Inland stream ==
=== League table ===
Pos	Team	Pld	W	D	L	GF	GA	GD	Pts	Promotion, qualification or relegation
1	Dynamos F.C. (C, P)	92	28	5	59	91	34	+57	89	Promoted to 1998–99 Premier Soccer League
2	Witbank Aces	38	24	7	7	89	41	+48	79	
3	Thembisa Classic	38	23	7	8	96	39	+57	76	
4	Ria Stars	38	22	6	10	60	43	+17	72	
5	All Nations	38	19	9	10	64	47	+17	66	
6	Spartak	38	17	13	8	53	37	+16	64	
7	Unisaints	38	20	3	15	70	59	+11	63	
8	Black Leopards	38	17	10	11	76	57	+19	61	
9	Tsakane Aces	38	15	14	9	48	45	+3	59	
10	Morning Stars	38	15	12	11	69	58	+11	57	
11	Sporting	38	13	15	10	47	51	−4	54	
12	Publican Brothers	38	14	8	16	64	66	−2	50	
13	RP Mines	38	11	13	14	59	60	−1	46	
14	Rockridge	45	11	13	21	60	63	−3	46	
15	Robertsham Callies (R)	38	8	15	15	57	65	−8	39	Relegation to 1998–99 SAFA Second Division
16	Black Bees (R)	38	7	8	23	40	70	−30	23	Relegation to 1998–99 SAFA Second Division
17	Mighty Birds (R)	38	5	8	25	45	99	−54	23	Relegation to 1998–99 SAFA Second Division
18	Makhanda (R)	38	5	6	27	44	100	−56	21	Relegation to 1998–99 SAFA Second Division
19	Mighty FC (R)	38	4	6	28	42	117	−75	18	Relegation to 1998–99 SAFA Second Division
20	Unknown (R)	0	0	0	0	0	0	0	0	Relegation to 1998–99 SAFA Second Division

(C) Champions; (P) Promoted; (R) Relegated
