= 1996–97 National First Division =

South African soccer season

National First Division
- Season: 1996–97
- Champions: Black Leopards, (Northern); Tembisa Classic (Southern); Santos (Western Cape); African Wanderers (Natal/Eastern Cape)

The 1996–97 National First Division was the 1st season of the second tier of South African soccer since the reorganisation in 1996.

It consisted of 76 clubs in four streams; Northern, Southern, Western Cape and Natal/Eastern Cape, with the winners being Black Leopards, (Northern), Tembisa Classic (Southern), Santos (Western Cape) and African Wanderers (Natal/Eastern Cape) respectively.

At the end of the season, the division was reduced to two stream of 20 teams each.

== Northern Stream ==
Pos	Team	Pld	W	D	L	GF	GA	GD	Pts	Promotion, qualification or relegation
1	Black Leopards (C)	42	26	10	6	86	43	+43	88	Promoted to 1998–99 Premier Soccer League
2	Ria Stars	41	26	7	8	83	34	+49	85	
3	Dynamos F.C.	42	24	11	7	93	42	+51	83	
4	RP Mines	42	23	11	8	59	35	+24	80	
5	Morning Stars	42	23	6	13	78	56	+22	75	
6	Pretoria Callies	42	22	9	11	66	44	+22	75	
7	Tsakane Aces	42	20	15	7	69	49	+20	75	
8	Acornbush	42	21	9	12	68	38	+30	72	
9	Ravens	42	20	11	11	68	47	+21	71	
10	Benfica	42	20	11	11	54	40	+14	71	
11	Oriental (R)	42	19	9	14	62	55	+7	66	Relegation to 1998–99 SAFA Second Division
12	Ferrometals (R)	42	17	12	13	52	54	−2	63	Relegation to 1998–99 SAFA Second Division
13	Middelburg (R)	42	18	8	16	63	65	−2	62	Relegation to 1998–99 SAFA Second Division
14	Witbank All Stars (R)	42	14	10	18	44	53	−9	52	Relegation to 1998–99 SAFA Second Division
15	Witbank City (R)	42	14	7	21	61	80	−19	49	Relegation to 1998–99 SAFA Second Division
16	Barberton (R)	42	11	11	20	51	81	−30	44	Relegation to 1998–99 SAFA Second Division
17	Highlanders (R)	42	11	8	23	42	70	−28	41	Relegation to 1998–99 SAFA Second Division
18	Barcelona (R)	42	9	9	24	23	34	−11	36	Relegation to 1998–99 SAFA Second Division
19	BA XI (R)	42	10	6	26	49	99	−50	36	Relegation to 1998–99 SAFA Second Division
20	Tihabane Swallows (R)	42	7	9	26	35	102	−67	30	Relegation to 1998–99 SAFA Second Division
21	Messina Kaizer XI (R)	42	7	4	31	34	63	−29	25	Relegation to 1998–99 SAFA Second Division
22	Rabali (R)	42	4	3	35	20	57	−37	15	Relegation to 1998–99 SAFA Second Division

(C) Champions; (R) Relegated

== Western Cape Stream ==
Pos	Team	Pld	W	D	L	GF	GA	GD	Pts	Promotion, qualification or relegation
1	Santos (C, P)	30	26	1	3	88	19	+69	79	Qualified for playoffs
2	Seven Stars	30	24	3	3	77	23	+54	75	
3	Trinitarians	30	17	5	8	52	38	+14	56	
4	Avendale Athletico	30	16	4	10	48	29	+19	52	
5	Wynberg St Johns	30	14	8	8	42	30	+12	50	
6	Vasco da Gama	30	12	8	10	59	45	+14	44	
7	Saxon Rovers	30	11	10	9	39	39	0	43	
8	FNB Rangers	30	13	2	15	51	65	−14	41	
9	Mutual (R)	30	12	4	14	40	61	−21	40	Relegation to 1997–98 SAFA Second Division
10	Edgemead (R)	30	10	6	14	42	46	−4	36	Relegation to 1997–98 SAFA Second Division
11	Battswood (R)	30	10	5	15	39	41	−2	35	Relegation to 1997–98 SAFA Second Division
12	Bellville (R)	30	8	7	15	33	45	−12	31	Relegation to 1997–98 SAFA Second Division
13	Camps Bay (R)	30	6	10	14	29	53	−24	28	Relegation to 1997–98 SAFA Second Division
14	Newtons (R)	30	6	6	18	33	56	−23	24	Relegation to 1997–98 SAFA Second Division
15	Norway Parks (R)	30	4	11	15	21	52	−31	23	Relegation to 1997–98 SAFA Second Division
16	Stephanians (R)	30	3	6	21	23	74	−51	15	Relegation to 1997–98 SAFA Second Division

(C) Champions; (P) Promoted; (R) Relegated
