= 2002–03 National First Division =

South African soccer season

National First Division
- Season: 2002–03
- Champions: AmaZulu (Coastal); Silver Stars (Inland)
- Promoted: AmaZulu, Silver Stars

The 2002–03 National First Division was the 7th season of the second tier of South African soccer since the reorganisation in 1996.

It consisted of two streams, an Inland stream of 16 teams, and a Coastal stream of 14 teams.

The Coastal stream was won by AmaZulu and the Inland stream by Silver Stars, with both earning promotion to the 2003–04 Premier Soccer League.

== Coastal stream ==
=== League table ===
Pos	Team	Pld	W	D	L	GF	GA	GD	Pts	Promotion, qualification or relegation
1	AmaZulu (C, P)	26	18	4	4	48	19	+29	58	Promoted to 2003–04 Premier Soccer League
2	Premier United	26	16	8	2	50	20	+30	56	
3	Avendale Athletico	26	14	5	7	37	26	+11	47	
4	FC Fortune	26	14	3	9	40	27	+13	45	
5	Basotho Tigers	26	13	4	9	43	38	+5	43	
6	Park United	26	13	3	10	51	36	+15	42	
7	Maritzburg City	26	10	5	11	32	33	−1	35	
8	Rainbow Stars	26	9	7	10	31	40	−9	34	
9	Uthukela	26	8	7	11	20	27	−7	31	
10	Royal Tigers	26	7	7	12	26	34	−8	28	
11	Moja United	26	8	4	14	31	41	−10	28	
12	Juventus	26	7	7	12	27	39	−12	28	
13	William Pescod	26	5	7	14	20	31	−11	22	
14	PE Technikon (R)	26	3	3	20	24	69	−45	12	Relegation to 2003–04 SAFA Second Division

(C) Champions; (P) Promoted; (R) Relegated

== Inland stream ==
=== League table ===
Pos	Team	Pld	W	D	L	GF	GA	GD	Pts	Promotion, qualification or relegation
1	Silver Stars (C, P)	30	24	3	3	69	15	+54	75	Promoted to 2003–04 Premier Soccer League
2	Bloemfontein Celtic	30	23	5	2	62	18	+44	74	
3	Pietersburg Pillars	30	19	3	8	54	29	+25	60	
4	City Sharks	30	16	7	7	46	23	+23	55	
5	Tembisa Classic	29	14	7	8	36	29	+7	49	
6	Bloemfontein Young Tigers	30	14	6	10	50	34	+16	48	
7	Maholosiane	30	13	6	11	44	39	+5	45	
8	Dobsonville All Nations	30	9	9	12	32	35	−3	36	
9	Mabopane Young Masters	30	9	7	14	41	40	+1	34	
10	Dangerous Aces	30	9	7	14	27	40	−13	34	
11	Peoples Bank Spurs	30	9	4	17	29	44	−15	31	
12	Alexandra United	30	7	10	13	34	53	−19	31	
13	Ledwaba Power Stars	29	7	8	14	32	49	−17	29	
14	Sporting	30	5	10	15	26	55	−29	25	
15	Welkom Stars	30	5	9	16	26	51	−25	24	
16	Spartak (R)	30	4	3	23	19	73	−54	15	Relegation to 2003–04 SAFA Second Division

(C) Champions; (P) Promoted; (R) Relegated
