= 2000–01 National First Division =

South African soccer season

National First Division
- Season: 2000–01
- Champions: AmaZulu (Coastal); Black Leopards (Inland)
- Promoted: AmaZulu, Black Leopards

The 2000–01 National First Division was the 5th season of the second tier of South African soccer since the reorganisation in 1996.

It consisted of two streams, an Inland stream of 16 teams, and a Coastal stream of 14 teams.

The Coastal stream was won by AmaZulu and the Inland stream by Black Leopards, with both earning promotion to the 2001–02 Premier Soccer League.

Arcadia Shepherds were relegated just short of 100 years after their formation, while Real Rovers were relegated after earning just two wins and six points all season, with a goal difference of minus 68.

== Prize money ==
Sides received R50 000 each for winning the stream, with the winner of the championship playoff receiving a further R25 000.

== Coastal stream ==
=== League table ===
Pos	Team	Pld	W	D	L	GF	GA	GD	Pts	Promotion, qualification or relegation
1	AmaZulu (C, P)	25	17	5	3	47	17	+30	56	Promoted to 2001–02 Premier Soccer League
2	Park United	26	17	4	5	51	24	+27	55	
3	Saxon Rovers	26	12	3	11	45	40	+5	39	
4	Maritzburg City	26	9	9	8	39	37	+2	36	
5	Avendale Athletico	26	10	6	10	30	31	−1	36	
6	Zulu Royals	26	10	6	10	36	30	+6	36	
7	FC Fortune	26	9	8	9	36	33	+3	35	
8	Mother City	25	8	8	9	32	31	+1	32	
9	Newtons	26	7	10	9	29	39	−10	31	
10	Rainbow Stars	26	7	8	11	35	40	−5	29	
11	Basotho Tigers	26	8	5	13	26	34	−8	29	
12	Royal Tigers	26	8	5	13	28	41	−13	29	
13	Phoenix City (R)	26	8	5	13	29	50	−21	29	Relegation to 2001–02 SAFA Second Division
14	Durban United (R)	26	8	4	14	35	51	−16	28	Relegation to 2001–02 SAFA Second Division

(C) Champions; (P) Promoted; (R) Relegated

== Inland stream ==
=== League table ===
Pos	Team	Pld	W	D	L	GF	GA	GD	Pts	Promotion, qualification or relegation
1	Black Leopards (C, P)	30	21	4	5	77	29	+48	67	Promoted to 2001–02 Premier Soccer League
2	Bloemfontein Young Tigers	30	16	6	8	46	28	+18	54	
3	Mabopane Young Masters	30	16	5	9	56	35	+21	53	
4	Dobsonville All Nations	30	13	10	7	56	40	+16	49	
5	Ledwaba Power Stars	30	15	4	11	46	46	0	49	
6	City Sharks	30	14	5	11	38	34	+4	47	
7	Pietersburg Pillars	30	14	4	12	43	37	+6	46	
8	Spartak	30	11	8	11	27	30	−3	41	
9	Katlehong City	30	12	4	14	45	45	0	40	
10	Silver Stars	30	9	12	9	38	33	+5	39	
11	Alexandra United	30	10	7	13	37	44	−7	37	
12	Dynamos	30	10	7	13	28	45	−17	37	
13	Witbank Black Aces	30	9	9	12	51	65	−14	36	
14	Sporting	30	10	6	14	42	40	+2	36	
15	Arcadia Shepherds (R)	30	10	5	15	44	55	−11	35	Relegation to 2001–02 SAFA Second Division
16	Real Rovers (R)	30	2	0	28	20	88	−68	6	Relegation to 2001–02 SAFA Second Division

(C) Champions; (P) Promoted; (R) Relegated
