= 2001–02 National First Division =

South African soccer season

National First Division
- Season: 2001–02
- Champions: African Wanderers (Coastal); Dynamos (Inland)
- Promoted: African Wanderers, Dynamos

The 2001–02 National First Division was the 6th season of the second tier of South African soccer since the reorganisation in 1996.

It consisted of two streams, an Inland stream of 16 teams, and a Coastal stream of 14 teams.

The Coastal stream was won by African Wanderers and the Inland stream by Dynamos, with both earning promotion to the 2002–03 Premier Soccer League.

Two seasons after setting a number of records for worst performing team in the Premier Division, Mother City were relegated from the Coastal Stream, finishing bottom.

== Bribery allegations ==
The manager of promotion-chasing Avendale Athletico, Trevor Heinrich, along with the coach, David Byrne, claimed to have been approached shortly before the club's game against William Pescod by a man offering that he could arrange for the game to go their way, for R6,000. The man claimed that another club, also in the promotion race, had offered the referee R4,500. Avendale refused the offer, and the game was drawn 1-1, with Avendale having a goal disallowed in the last minute.

League winners Wanderers defeated Avendale Athletico 1–0 in another key game, with a goal controversially disallowed amongst allegations of bribery and corruption.

== Coastal stream ==
=== League table ===
| Pos | Team | Pld | W | D | L | GF | GA | GD | Pts | Promotion, qualification or relegation |
|---|---|---|---|---|---|---|---|---|---|---|
| 1 | African Wanderers (C, P) | 26 | 16 | 7 | 3 | 45 | 21 | +24 | 55 | Promoted to 2002–03 Premier Soccer League |
| 2 | Avendale Athletico | 26 | 13 | 9 | 4 | 48 | 23 | +25 | 48 | |
| 3 | Maritzburg City | 25 | 13 | 6 | 6 | 37 | 18 | +19 | 45 | |
| 4 | Park United | 26 | 11 | 9 | 6 | 32 | 28 | +4 | 42 | |
| 5 | Saxon Rovers | 26 | 10 | 11 | 5 | 41 | 35 | +6 | 41 | |
| 6 | Rainbow Stars | 26 | 10 | 8 | 8 | 37 | 38 | −1 | 38 | |
| 7 | Basotho Tigers | 26 | 10 | 6 | 10 | 39 | 38 | +1 | 36 | |
| 8 | William Pescod | 26 | 8 | 8 | 10 | 34 | 39 | −5 | 32 | |
| 9 | PE Technikon | 26 | 8 | 8 | 10 | 24 | 32 | −8 | 32 | |
| 10 | Premier United | 26 | 7 | 8 | 11 | 33 | 38 | −5 | 29 | |
| 11 | Royal Tigers | 26 | 6 | 10 | 10 | 27 | 41 | −14 | 28 | |
| 12 | FC Fortune | 26 | 6 | 9 | 11 | 30 | 43 | −13 | 27 | |
| 13 | Newtons (R) | 25 | 5 | 5 | 15 | 25 | 37 | −12 | 20 | Relegation to 2002–03 SAFA Second Division |
| 14 | Mother City (R) | 26 | 1 | 10 | 15 | 20 | 41 | −21 | 13 | Relegation to 2002–03 SAFA Second Division |

(C) Champions; (P) Promoted; (R) Relegated

== Inland stream ==
=== League table ===
| Pos | Team | Pld | W | D | L | GF | GA | GD | Pts | Promotion, qualification or relegation |
|---|---|---|---|---|---|---|---|---|---|---|
| 1 | Dynamos (C, P) | 30 | 19 | 8 | 3 | 51 | 22 | +29 | 65 | Promoted to 2002–03 Premier Soccer League |
| 2 | Silver Stars | 30 | 18 | 7 | 5 | 52 | 32 | +20 | 61 | |
| 3 | Pietersburg Pillars | 30 | 19 | 3 | 8 | 53 | 29 | +24 | 60 | |
| 4 | Bloemfontein Celtic | 30 | 17 | 8 | 5 | 48 | 29 | +19 | 59 | |
| 5 | Bloemfontein Young Tigers | 30 | 14 | 7 | 9 | 44 | 29 | +15 | 49 | |
| 6 | Welkom Stars | 30 | 14 | 5 | 11 | 53 | 48 | +5 | 47 | |
| 7 | Mabopane Young Masters | 30 | 14 | 4 | 12 | 37 | 30 | +7 | 46 | |
| 8 | Spartak | 30 | 12 | 5 | 13 | 48 | 41 | +7 | 41 | |
| 9 | City Sharks | 30 | 11 | 8 | 11 | 37 | 41 | −4 | 41 | |
| 10 | Ledwaba Power Stars | 30 | 10 | 7 | 13 | 49 | 48 | +1 | 37 | |
| 11 | Alexandra United | 30 | 8 | 9 | 13 | 37 | 45 | −8 | 33 | |
| 12 | Dobsonville All Nations | 30 | 9 | 5 | 16 | 43 | 55 | −12 | 32 | |
| 13 | Sporting | 30 | 8 | 6 | 16 | 35 | 53 | −18 | 30 | |
| 14 | Witbank Black Aces | 30 | 7 | 6 | 17 | 38 | 56 | −18 | 27 | |
| 15 | Katlehong City (R) | 30 | 5 | 8 | 17 | 28 | 56 | −28 | 23 | Relegation to 2002–03 SAFA Second Division |
| 16 | Mamelodi Juventus (R) | 30 | 4 | 6 | 20 | 29 | 68 | −39 | 18 | Relegation to 2002–03 SAFA Second Division |

(C) Champions; (P) Promoted; (R) Relegated
