= 2004–05 National First Division =

South African soccer season

National First Division
- Season: 2004–05
- Champions: Free State Stars
- Promoted: Free State Stars, Tembisa Classic
- Relegated: Dangerous Darkies; North-West Tigers; Avendale Athletico; Louisvale Pirates

The 2004–05 National First Division (known as the Mvela Golden League for sponsorship reasons) was the 9th season of the National First Division, the second tier of South African soccer.

Under the new sponsor, the two streams, Coastal and Inland, were merged into a single national league.

The champions were Free State Stars, who were promoted to the South African Premier Division. Tembisa Classic also earned promotion, after winning the playoffs.

Four clubs were relegated, as the following 2005–06 National First Division was reduced from 18 to 16 teams.

Basotho Tigers were renamed North-West Tigers, moving to Vryburg from Kimberley and after another change of ownership, to Johannesburg.

Pos	Team	Pld	W	D	L	GF	GA	GD	Pts	Promotion, qualification or relegation
1	Free State Stars (C, P)	34	19	10	5	46	23	+23	67	Promoted to 2005–06 Premier Soccer League
2	Durban Stars	34	17	9	8	48	35	+13	60	Promotion Playoff
3	Hellenic	34	18	5	11	60	43	+17	59	Promotion Playoff
4	Tembisa Classic (P)	34	18	5	11	54	41	+13	59	Promotion Playoff
5	Maritzburg United	34	16	9	9	54	36	+18	57	
6	Zulu Royals	34	15	8	11	44	31	+13	53	
7	Vasco Da Gama	34	14	11	9	43	39	+4	53	
8	FC Fortune	34	11	13	10	36	33	+3	46	
9	Pietersburg Pillars	34	11	10	13	43	44	−1	43	
10	Bloemfontein Young Tigers	34	11	9	14	51	51	0	42	
11	Winners Park	34	10	12	12	37	43	−6	42	
12	Pretoria University	34	10	11	13	48	44	+4	41	
13	Mabopane Young Masters	34	9	11	14	45	51	−6	38	
14	Uthukela	34	9	11	14	33	45	−12	38	
15	Dangerous Darkies (R)	34	7	15	12	34	45	−11	36	Relegation to 2005–06 SAFA Second Division
16	North-West Tigers (R)	34	7	14	13	27	40	−13	35	Relegation to 2005–06 SAFA Second Division
17	Avendale Athletico (R)	34	8	8	18	47	65	−18	32	Relegation to 2005–06 SAFA Second Division
18	Louisvale Pirates (R)	34	6	9	19	22	63	−41	27	Relegation to 2005–06 SAFA Second Division

(C) Champions; (P) Promoted; (R) Relegated

== Promotion play-off ==
=== Semi-finals ===
4 June 2005
First leg

Tembisa Classic	2–1	Durban Stars

12 June 2005
Second leg

Durban Stars	1–1	Tembisa Classic

5 June 2005
First leg

Hellenic	3–1	Manning Rangers

11 June 2005
Second leg

Manning Rangers	2–3	Hellenic

Manning Rangers, who finished 15th in the 2004–05 Premier Soccer League, were relegated to the 2005–06 National First Division

=== Final ===
19 June 2005
First leg

Tembisa Classic	3–0	Hellenic

25 June 2005
Second leg

Hellenic	2–1	Tembisa Classic

Tembisa Classic earned promotion to the 2006–07 Premier Soccer League.
