= Ashley Opperman =

South African soccer player

Personal information
- Date of birth: 13 January 1983 (age 43)
- Place of birth: Cape Town, South Africa
- Height: 1.78 m (5 ft 10 in)
- Position: Right back

Team information
- Current team: Hanover Park

Youth career
- 19??–1999: Seven Stars
- 1999–2000: Ajax Cape Town

Senior career*
Years	Team	Apps	(Gls)
2000–2005	Ajax Cape Town		
2002–2003	→ Avendale Athletico (loan)		
2005–2007	Moroka Swallows		
2007–2008	Ikapa Sporting		
2008–2010	Vasco da Gama		
2010–2011	Hanover Park		
2011-2012	Chippa United		
- * Club domestic league appearances and goals as of 1:00, 25 December 2023 (UTC)

Ashley Opperman (born 13 January 1983 in Cape Town, Western Cape) is a South African football (soccer) defender who plays for Hanover Park of the National First Division.

He made his Premier Soccer League (PSL) debut with Ajax Cape Town as a teenager during the 2000–01 season before spending time on loan at First Division club Avendale Athletico. In 2005, he returned to the PSL with Moroka Swallows, then spent a season with Ikapa Sporting before joining Vasco da Gama, who released him following their promotion to the PSL. In September 2010 he signed for Hanover Park. After playing for Hanover Park for just one season, he left the team and joined Chippa United, where he remained for the rest of his Soccer career until his retirement in July 2012.
