= 2005–06 National First Division =

South African soccer season

National First Division
- Season: 2005–06
- Champions: Wits University
- Relegated: FC Fortune; Bloemfontein Young Tigers

The 2005–06 National First Division (known as the Mvela Golden League for sponsorship reasons) was the 10th season of the National First Division, the second tier of South African soccer.

The champions were Wits University, who were promoted to the South African Premier Division.

Pos	Team	Pld	W	D	L	GF	GA	GD	Pts	Promotion, qualification or relegation
1	Wits University (C, P)	30	23	2	5	55	26	+29	71	Promoted to 2006–07 Premier Soccer League
2	City Pillars	30	17	8	5	57	36	+21	59	Promotion Playoff
3	Vasco Da Gama	30	16	8	6	59	38	+21	56	Promotion Playoff
4	Benoni Premier United (P)	30	14	10	6	41	30	+11	52	Promotion Playoff
5	PJ Stars Kings	30	13	8	9	49	40	+9	47	
6	Mabopane Young Masters	30	11	8	11	43	48	−5	41	
7	Nathi Lions	30	11	6	13	39	39	0	39	
8	Zulu Royals	30	9	11	10	32	31	+1	38	
9	Winners Park	30	9	10	11	37	37	0	37	
10	Durban Stars	30	10	5	15	39	48	−9	35	
11	Pretoria University	30	7	14	9	38	48	−10	35	
12	Manning Rangers	30	7	10	13	33	44	−11	31	
13	Witbank Spurs	30	8	5	17	40	51	−11	29	
14	Maritzburg United	30	6	11	13	23	38	−15	29	
15	FC Fortune (R)	30	5	13	12	34	51	−17	28	Relegation to 2006–07 SAFA Second Division
16	Bloemfontein Young Tigers (R)	30	5	9	16	29	43	−14	24	Relegation to 2006–07 SAFA Second Division

(C) Champions; (P) Promoted; (R) Relegated

== Promotion play-off ==
=== Semi-finals ===
13 May 2006
First leg

Bush Bucks	0–2	Vasco da Gama

28 May 2006
Second leg

Vasco da Gama	2–1	Bush Bucks

Bush Bucks, who finished 15th in the 2005–06 Premier Soccer League, were relegated to the 2006–07 National First Division

14 May 2006
First leg

Benoni Premier United	3–1	City Pillars

27 May 2006
Second leg

City Pillars	0–1	Benoni Premier United

=== Final ===
3 June 2006
First leg

Benoni Premier United	0–0	Vasco da Gama

11 June 2006
Second leg

Vasco da Gama	0–1	Benoni Premier United

Benoni Premier United were promoted to the 2006–07 Premier Soccer League.
