= Augustine Mahlonoko =

South African soccer player

Personal information
- Date of birth: 17 August 2001 (age 25)
- Place of birth: Gauteng [Sebokeng]
- Height: 1.72 m (5 ft 8 in)
- Position: Midfielder

Team information
- Current team: Moroka Swallows
- Number: 80

Youth career
- –2018: Orlando Pirates

Senior career*
Years	Team	Apps	(Gls)
2018–2020	Orlando Pirates	4	(0)
2020–2021	Baroka	6	(0)
2021–2022	Pretoria Callies	4	(0)
2022–2024	La Masia	23	(2)
2024–	Moroka Swallows	3	(1)
- * Club domestic league appearances and goals as of 20 March 2024

Augustine Mahlonoko (born 17 August 2001) is a South African professional soccer player who plays as a midfielder for Moroka Swallows. He is a graduate of the Orlando Pirates academy and became the club's youngest ever debutant in August 2018 before being released two years later.

== Club career ==
=== Orlando Pirates ===
Mahlonoko began his footballing career with Orlando Pirates where he excelled for the club's academy and captained their MultiChoice Diski Challenge side. In 2018, he won the club's Development Player of the Season award and was part of the u-21 side which traveled to Brazil for the Project X tournament. His performances during the tournament impressed first-team coach Milutin Sredojević who subsequently included him in the club's pre-season tour of Zambia. His rapid rise to prominence continued and on 3 August, despite not having played a single match for the club's reserve side, he was promoted to the first team permanently ahead of the 2018–19 PSL campaign. He made his debut the following day, coming on as a late substitute in a 1–1 draw with Highlands Park. Upon entering the field of play, Mahlonoko broke the record set by Lyle Foster the season before for the youngest player to debut for Orlando Pirates, doing so at the age of 16 years and 352 days. The following season, he was demoted to the club's reserve team before being released from his contract in July 2020.

=== Baroka ===
He joined Baroka on a three-year contract in September 2020.

== Career statistics ==
=== Club ===
As of match played 20 July 2020

Appearances and goals by club, season and competition
Club	Season	League			Cup^{1}		League Cup^{2}		Continental^{3}		Other^{4}		Total	
Club	Season	Division	Apps	Goals	Apps	Goals	Apps	Goals	Apps	Goals	Apps	Goals	Apps	Goals
Orlando Pirates	2018–19	PSL	4	0	0	0	0	0	0	0	0	0	4	0
Orlando Pirates	2019–20	PSL	0	0	0	0	0	0	0	0	0	0	0	0
Career total			0	0	0	0	0	0	0	0	0	0	0	0

^{1} Includes Nedbank Cup matches.
^{2} Includes Telkom Knockout matches.
^{3} Includes CAF Champions League matches.
^{4} Includes MTN 8 matches.

== Honours and achievements ==
=== Individual ===
- Orlando Pirates Development Player of the Year: 2018

=== Records ===
==== Orlando Pirates ====
- Youngest player: 16 years and 352 days
