= 2011 MTN 8 =

Tournament details
- Country: South Africa
- Teams: 8

Final positions
- Champions: Orlando Pirates (9th title)
- Runners-up: Kaizer Chiefs

Tournament statistics
- Matches played: 9
- Goals scored: 22 (2.44 per match)
- Top goal scorer: Thembinkosi Fanteni (Ajax Cape Town) 3

The 2011 MTN 8 was the 37th time that this South African annual football tournament took place. It was contested by the eight top teams of the Premier Soccer League table at the end of the 2010-11 season. The tournament began on 5 August 2011 and was won by Orlando Pirates.

== Teams ==
The eight teams that competed in the MTN 8 Wafa Wafa knockout competition are: (listed according to their finishing position in the 2010–11 Premier Soccer League).

1. Orlando Pirates
2. Ajax Cape Town
3. Kaizer Chiefs
4. Mamelodi Sundowns
5. Bloemfontein Celtic
6. Bidvest Wits
7. Supersport United
8. Santos

== Fixtures & Results ==
=== New rule for MTN8 ===
On 28 July 2011 The PSL Executive Committee held a meeting to discuss the issue of home and away fixtures. There has been an amendment to the MTN8 rules pertaining to the issue of home and away fixtures.

The approved rule reads as follows: In the first round of the competition (last 8 or quarter-finals) the clubs finishing in the top four positions of the Premier Division in the previous season will be the home clubs.

=== Quarter-finals ===
5 August 2011
20:00

Ajax Cape Town	5–2	Supersport United
Thembinkosi Fanteni 9', 85'; Khama Billiat 23', 89'; Sici Shelembe 33'	Report	54' Thandani Ntshumayelo; 71' Jabulani Maluleke

Cape Town Stadium, Cape Town

6 August 2011
15:00

Mamelodi Sundowns	1–0	Bloemfontein Celtic
Khenyeza 79'	Report

Lucas Masterpieces Moripe Stadium, Atteridgeville

6 August 2011
20:15

Orlando Pirates	1–0 aet	Santos
Sangweni 105'	Report

Orlando Stadium, Soweto

7 August 2011
15:00

Kaizer Chiefs	2–1	Bidvest Wits
Bernard Parker (pen.), 20'; Mandla Masango 41'	Report	11' Sboniso Fredericks

FNB Stadium, Soweto
Attendance: 84,000

=== Teams through to the Semi-finals ===
- 1 Ajax Cape Town
- 2 Mamelodi Sundowns
- 3 Orlando Pirates
- 4 Kaizer Chiefs

The draw for the Semi-finals was held on Monday 8 August 2011.

=== Semi-finals ===
Team 1	Agg.	Team 2	1st leg	2nd leg
Kaizer Chiefs (South Africa)	*1 - 1	(South Africa) Ajax Cape Town	0 - 0	1 - 1
Orlando Pirates (South Africa)	4 - 3	(South Africa) Mamelodi Sundowns	3 - 2	1 - 1

- Kaizer Chiefs advance to the final on away goal.

==== 1st leg ====
20 August 2011
20:15

Kaizer Chiefs	0–0	Ajax Cape Town

FNB Stadium, Soweto
21 August 2011
15:00

Orlando Pirates	3–2	Mamelodi Sundowns

Orlando Stadium, Soweto

==== 2nd leg ====
27 August 2011
20:15

Ajax Cape Town	1–1	Kaizer Chiefs

Cape Town Stadium, Cape Town
29 August 2011
15:00

Mamelodi Sundowns	1–1	Orlando Pirates

Loftus Versfeld Stadium, Pretoria

=== Final ===
10 September 2011
20:15

Orlando Pirates	1–0 aet	Kaizer Chiefs
Oupa Manyisa 107'

FNB Stadium, Soweto
