= 2006–07 National First Division =

National First Division
- Season: 2006–07
- Champions: Free State Stars
- Promoted: Free State Stars
- Relegated: OR Tambo District; PJ Stars Kings

The 2006–07 National First Division (known as the Mvela Golden League for sponsorship reasons) was the 11th season of the National First Division, the second tier of South African soccer.

The champions were Free State Stars, who finished eighteen points ahead of their nearest rivals, and were promoted to the South African Premier Division.

== Points deductions ==
PJ Stars Kings were deducted 15 points by SAFA for using unregistered players, and as a result suffered relegation to the SAFA Second Division. Nathi Lions and City Pillars were deducted 1 point and 4 points respectively for the same reason.

== League table ==
Pos	Team	Pld	W	D	L	GF	GA	GD	Pts	Promotion, qualification or relegation
1	Free State Stars (C, P)	30	22	4	4	74	26	+48	70	Promoted to the 2007–08 Premier Soccer League
2	Winners Park	30	13	13	4	51	34	+17	52	Qualification to Promotion play-off
3	University of Pretoria	30	13	12	5	44	28	+16	51	Qualification to Promotion play-off
4	FC AK	30	14	6	10	42	30	+12	48	Qualification to Promotion play-off
5	City Pillars	30	13	10	7	53	39	+14	45	
6	Dynamos	30	13	6	11	45	36	+9	45	
7	Durban Stars	30	12	6	12	39	46	−7	42	
8	Witbank Spurs	30	12	5	13	39	44	−5	41	
9	Fidentia Rangers	30	12	4	14	43	42	+1	40	
10	Nathi Lions	30	10	8	12	33	37	−4	37	
11	Ga-Rankuwa United	30	8	11	11	35	38	−3	35	
12	Vasco da Gama	30	9	8	13	39	51	−12	35	
13	Bay United	30	7	12	11	32	43	−11	33	
14	Western Province United	30	6	7	17	35	60	−25	25	
15	OR Tambo District (R)	30	6	4	20	29	63	−34	22	Relegation to SAFA Second Division
16	PJ Stars Kings (R)	30	8	8	14	32	48	−16	17	Relegation to SAFA Second Division

(C) Champions; (P) Promoted; (R) Relegated

== Promotion play-offs ==
Semi-finals

Team 1	Agg.	Team 2	1st leg	2nd leg
Pretoria University	1a–1	Winners Park	0–0	1–1
FC AK	1–4	AmaZulu	0–3	1–1

Final

Team 1	Agg.	Team 2	1st leg	2nd leg
Pretoria University	1–3	AmaZulu	0–0	1–3
