= Van Graan =

van Graan is a surname. Notable people with the surname include:

- Alcardo van Graan (born 1986), South African footballer
- Johann van Graan (born 1980), South African rugby union coach
- Robbie van Graan (1939–2014), South African cricketer
- Tanya van Graan (born 1983), South African actress
