= 2020–21 SAFA Second Division =

SAFA Second Division
- Season: 2020–21
- Champions: Hungry Lions
- Promoted: Platinum City Rovers

The 2020–21 SAFA Second Division (known as the ABC Motsepe League for sponsorship reasons) was the 23rd season of the SAFA Second Division, the third tier for South African association football clubs, since its establishment in 1998. Due to the size of South Africa, the competition was split into nine divisions, one for each region. After the league stage of the regional competition was completed, the nine winning teams of each regional division entered the playoffs.

Due to the COVID-19 pandemic in South Africa, divisions were divided into two streams, and all games were played behind closed doors.

Hungry Lions defeated Platinum City Rovers 5–4 on penalties, with both teams winning promotion to the 2021-22 National First Division. The teams earned R1 million and R500,000 respectively, with R200,000 and R100,000 being earmarked for youth development projects.

== Regions ==
=== Eastern Cape ===
==== Stream A ====
Pos	Team	Pld	W	D	L	GF	GA	GD	Pts	Qualification or relegation
1	Spear of the Nation	16	14	2	0	31	7	+24	44	Playoffs
2	Sibaya All Stars	16	10	3	3	34	19	+15	33	
3	Amavarara	16	7	4	5	23	15	+8	25	
4	Bush Bucks	16	7	4	5	22	17	+5	25	
5	Bisho Stars	16	5	6	5	20	17	+3	21	
6	Siyanda	16	5	5	6	15	17	−2	20	
7	Highbury FC	16	3	6	7	21	33	−12	15	
8	Swartkops Valley United Brothers	16	2	3	11	11	36	−25	9	
9	Tede United	16	1	3	12	14	30	−16	6	

Source: https://diskizone.com/table/abc-motsepe-eastern-cape-stream-a-log-2020-2021/

==== Stream B ====
Pos	Team	Pld	W	D	L	GF	GA	GD	Pts	Qualification or relegation
1	BCM Stars	16	12	3	1	34	7	+27	39	Playoffs
2	Sinenkani	16	10	4	2	32	12	+20	34	
3	Matta Milan	16	9	3	4	14	11	+3	30	
4	Bush Pirates	16	7	1	8	22	26	−4	22	
5	AmaMpondo United	16	6	1	9	36	38	−2	19	
6	Birmingham City	16	5	4	7	22	34	−12	19	
7	PE Stars	16	3	7	6	14	21	−7	16	
8	Manchester United	16	3	4	9	19	27	−8	13	
9	Port Elizabeth	16	3	1	12	15	32	−17	10	

Source: https://diskizone.com/table/abc-motsepe-eastern-cape-stream-b-log-2020-2021/

=== Free State ===
==== Stream A ====
Pos	Team	Pld	W	D	L	GF	GA	GD	Pts	Qualification or relegation
1	Mangaung Unite	16	13	3	0	45	4	+41	42	Playoffs
2	Super Eagles	16	10	3	3	30	15	+15	33	
3	Dikwena United	16	8	2	6	20	20	0	26	
4	Small Tigers	16	7	3	6	22	21	+1	24	
5	Bloemfontein Young Tigers	16	8	0	8	24	24	0	24	
6	Kovsies	16	5	2	9	18	23	−5	17	
7	Harmony FC	16	4	4	8	12	26	−14	16	
8	Central University	16	3	3	10	10	26	−16	12	
9	Mphatlalatsane United	16	3	2	11	14	36	−22	11	

Source: https://diskizone.com/table/abc-motsepe-free-state-stream-a-log-2020-2021/

==== Stream B ====
Pos	Team	Pld	W	D	L	GF	GA	GD	Pts	Qualification or relegation
1	D General FC	14	9	2	3	26	15	+11	29	Playoffs
2	Caledon FC	14	8	3	3	22	13	+9	27	
3	Mathaithai	14	7	1	6	19	18	+1	22	
4	Bloemfontein Celtic Development	14	4	5	5	13	15	−2	17	
5	African Warriors	14	5	2	7	17	20	−3	17	
6	Marquard Dynamos	14	4	5	5	15	19	−4	17	
7	FC Matjhabeng	14	5	1	8	18	22	−4	16	
8	Sibanye Golden Stars	14	2	5	7	21	29	−8	11	
9	Questus FC	0	0	0	0	0	0	0	0	

Source: https://diskizone.com/table/abc-motsepe-free-state-stream-b-log-2020-2021/

=== Gauteng ===
==== Stream A ====
Pos	Team	Pld	W	D	L	GF	GA	GD	Pts	Qualification or relegation
1	African All Stars	14	7	6	1	17	9	+8	27	Playoffs
2	Leruma United	14	6	6	2	21	15	+6	24	
3	M Tigers	14	5	5	4	21	15	+6	20	
4	Tembisa Sports Centre	14	5	5	4	16	14	+2	20	
5	Dondol Stars	14	5	4	5	10	14	−4	19	
6	Mamelodi All Stars	14	3	5	6	15	17	−2	14	
7	Senaoane Gunners	14	3	5	6	14	19	−5	14	
8	Blue Lions	14	3	2	9	13	24	−11	11	
9	La Masia	0	0	0	0	0	0	0	0	

Source: https://diskizone.com/table/abc-motsepe-gauteng-stream-a-log-2020-2021/

==== Stream B ====
Pos	Team	Pld	W	D	L	GF	GA	GD	Pts	Qualification or relegation
1	FC RESA	14	6	7	1	18	10	+8	25	Playoffs
2	Highlands Park	14	7	3	4	17	10	+7	24	
3	Pele Pele	14	4	7	3	14	12	+2	19	
4	Dube Continental	14	5	4	5	18	19	−1	19	
5	NMVU Vaal	14	4	5	5	19	17	+2	17	
6	Wits University	14	3	7	4	20	26	−6	16	
7	Alexandra Black Aces	14	4	3	7	16	22	−6	15	
8	Maholosiane	14	2	6	6	13	19	−6	12	
9	AJ United	0	0	0	0	0	0	0	0	

Source: https://diskizone.com/table/abc-motsepe-gauteng-stream-b-log-2020-2021/

=== Kwazulu-Natal ===
==== Stream A ====
Pos	Team	Pld	W	D	L	GF	GA	GD	Pts	Qualification or relegation
1	Umvoti	18	14	3	1	41	9	+32	45	Playoffs
2	uMsinga United	18	12	4	2	30	16	+14	40	
3	Happy Wanderers	18	9	7	2	45	23	+22	34	
4	GWP Friends	18	10	2	6	32	15	+17	32	
5	Summerfield Dynamos	18	9	5	4	35	22	+13	32	
6	Ethekwini Coastal	18	6	5	7	19	17	+2	23	
7	G Millionariare	18	7	1	10	25	27	−2	22	
8	XI Experience	18	4	2	12	15	42	−27	14	
9	Running Water	18	2	3	13	23	50	−27	9	
10	Royal Eagles	18	1	0	17	10	54	−44	3	

Source: https://diskizone.com/table/abc-motsepe-kzn-stream-a-log-2020-2021/

==== Stream B ====
Pos	Team	Pld	W	D	L	GF	GA	GD	Pts	Qualification or relegation
1	Real Kings	16	11	2	3	28	12	+16	35	Playoffs
2	KwaDabeka Sporting	16	9	3	4	31	10	+21	30	
3	Milford FC	16	8	6	2	16	6	+10	30	
4	Njampela FC	16	7	5	4	19	16	+3	26	
5	Durban FC	16	5	4	7	20	36	−16	19	
6	Muzi King Masters	16	4	5	7	15	18	−3	17	
7	Asande FC	16	4	2	10	11	18	−7	14	
8	Black Lions	16	3	5	8	15	25	−10	14	
9	Qwabe United	16	4	2	10	14	28	−14	14	

Source: https://diskizone.com/table/abc-motsepe-kzn-stream-b-log-2020-2021/

=== Limpopo ===
==== Stream A ====
Pos	Team	Pld	W	D	L	GF	GA	GD	Pts	Qualification or relegation
1	The Dolphins	16	10	4	2	41	11	+30	34	Playoffs
2	Mikhado FC	16	8	8	0	18	7	+11	32	
3	Munaca FC	16	7	4	5	18	16	+2	25	
4	TRON FC	15	7	4	4	18	17	+1	25	
5	Venda Football Academy	14	4	6	4	11	12	−1	18	
6	Ablex United	16	5	2	9	16	25	−9	17	
7	Giyani Happy Boys	16	4	4	8	18	22	−4	16	
8	Ollesdas FC	16	3	5	8	13	20	−7	14	
9	Makotopong Brazil FC	15	1	5	9	11	34	−23	8	

Source: https://diskizone.com/table/abc-motsepe-limpopo-stream-a-log-2020-2021/

==== Stream B ====
Pos	Team	Pld	W	D	L	GF	GA	GD	Pts	Qualification or relegation
1	Magesi F.C.	15	11	2	2	30	12	+18	35	Playoffs
2	Polokwane City Academy	15	11	2	2	34	17	+17	35	
3	Ngwaabe City Motors FC	15	6	5	4	21	14	+7	23	
4	Ditlou F.C.	15	5	4	6	20	18	+2	19	
5	Dennilton Callies	16	5	2	9	27	36	−9	17	
6	Mighty F.C.	14	3	6	5	14	20	−6	15	
7	Berachah Valley F.C.	15	3	5	7	19	23	−4	14	
8	Eleven Fast Tigers	14	4	2	8	18	25	−7	14	
9	Terrors FC	13	4	0	9	13	31	−18	12	

Source: https://diskizone.com/table/abc-motsepe-limpopo-stream-b-log-2020-2021/

=== Mpumalanga ===
==== Stream A ====
Pos	Team	Pld	W	D	L	GF	GA	GD	Pts	Qualification or relegation
1	Sivutsa Stars	16	13	2	1	28	7	+21	41	Playoffs
2	Passion FC	16	9	2	5	29	16	+13	29	
3	Kanyamazane All Stars	16	8	4	4	20	14	+6	28	
4	Kriel Football Academy	16	8	3	5	21	16	+5	27	
5	Gemsbok Classic	16	4	6	6	21	21	0	18	
6	Barberton City Stars	15	5	3	7	21	23	−2	18	
7	Lekwa City	16	5	2	9	22	27	−5	17	
8	Witbank Citylads	15	4	4	7	13	19	−6	16	
9	FC Benfica	16	2	0	14	10	42	−32	6	

Source: https://diskizone.com/table/abc-motsepe-mpumalanga-stream-a-log-2020-2021/

==== Stream B ====
Pos	Team	Pld	W	D	L	GF	GA	GD	Pts	Qualification or relegation
1	Witbank Shepard	16	14	1	1	33	11	+22	43	Playoffs
2	VOC United FC	16	10	5	1	33	13	+20	35	
3	Mlambo Royal Cubs	16	9	2	5	26	17	+9	29	
4	Sabie Bayern	16	7	5	4	32	21	+11	26	
5	Secunda M Stars	16	6	4	6	16	13	+3	22	
6	Mbombela City Lads	16	6	1	9	21	24	−3	19	
7	Elshaddai United	16	5	2	9	20	25	−5	17	
8	BTM Sports	16	2	2	12	8	34	−26	8	
9	Mpumalanga Young Eagles	16	1	2	13	15	46	−31	5	

Source: https://diskizone.com/table/abc-motsepe-mpumalanga-stream-b-log-2020-2021/

=== North West ===
==== Stream A ====
Pos	Team	Pld	W	D	L	GF	GA	GD	Pts	Qualification or relegation
1	Ally's Tigers	16	11	1	4	41	16	+25	34	Playoffs
2	TUT F.C.	16	9	2	5	28	15	+13	29	
3	Master Peace	16	8	3	5	24	23	+1	27	
4	NWU Tawana	16	6	6	4	28	26	+2	24	
5	Captain Eleven	16	5	4	7	25	33	−8	19	
6	City Rovers	16	5	3	8	26	39	−13	18	
7	Taung Mega Stars	16	4	4	8	30	35	−5	16	
8	Tigane United	15	4	4	7	23	31	−8	16	
9	Young Zebras F.C.	15	4	3	8	22	29	−7	15	

Source: https://diskizone.com/table/abc-motsepe-north-west-stream-a-log-2020-2021/

==== Stream B ====
Pos	Team	Pld	W	D	L	GF	GA	GD	Pts	Qualification or relegation
1	Platinum City Rovers	16	13	1	2	31	7	+24	40	Playoffs
2	FC Maginim	16	7	3	6	16	23	−7	24	
3	Orbit College	16	7	2	7	21	11	+10	23	
4	Buya Msuthu F.C.	16	6	5	5	17	13	+4	23	
5	North West University	16	6	4	6	20	18	+2	22	
6	Thaba Tshwane FC	16	6	4	6	14	14	0	22	
7	Makapanstad Romans F.C.	16	4	6	6	13	18	−5	18	
8	Red Lions	16	3	5	8	16	32	−16	14	
9	Stilfontein Real Hearts	16	3	4	9	17	29	−12	13	

Source: https://diskizone.com/table/abc-motsepe-north-west-stream-b-log-2020-2021/

=== Northern Cape ===
==== South Stream ====
Pos	Team	Pld	W	D	L	GF	GA	GD	Pts	Qualification or relegation
1	Hungry Lions	16	16	0	0	44	4	+40	48	Playoffs
2	NC Zasco	16	8	3	5	22	23	−1	27	
3	Tsantshabane Stars FC	16	6	3	7	29	31	−2	21	
4	NC Liverpool	16	6	2	8	23	23	0	20	
5	United Rovers	16	6	1	9	28	32	−4	19	
6	Colville United	16	4	6	6	24	32	−8	18	
7	Kuruman Kicks	16	5	3	8	16	26	−10	18	
8	Real Madrid	16	4	4	8	24	28	−4	16	
9	Rasta Far Eagles	16	4	4	8	18	29	−11	16	

Source: https://diskizone.com/table/abc-motsepe-northern-cape-south-stream-log-2020-2021/

==== West Stream ====
Pos	Team	Pld	W	D	L	GF	GA	GD	Pts	Qualification or relegation
1	NC Professionals	16	13	3	0	55	15	+40	42	Playoffs
2	Southey Stars	16	8	2	6	31	21	+10	26	
3	CF Mots	16	8	1	7	30	26	+4	25	
4	Olifantshoek Young Stars	16	7	1	8	35	44	−9	22	
5	Tornado FC	16	6	3	7	33	35	−2	21	
6	Khumalo Chiefs	16	5	5	6	25	30	−5	20	
7	Kakamas Juventus	16	5	4	7	23	42	−19	19	
8	Kakamas Sundowns	16	5	1	10	29	34	−5	16	
9	Mainstay United	16	4	2	10	21	35	−14	14	

Source: https://diskizone.com/table/abc-motsepe-northern-cape-west-stream-log-2020-2021/

=== Western Cape ===
Pos	Team	Pld	W	D	L	GF	GA	GD	Pts	Qualification or relegation
1	Glendene United	12	11	0	1	23	7	+16	33	Playoffs
2	Batalion FC	12	7	2	3	22	16	+6	23	
3	Zizwe United	12	5	4	3	18	13	+5	19	
4	Hout Bay United	12	5	2	5	18	15	+3	17	
5	Ubuntu Cape Town	12	3	3	6	21	25	−4	12	
6	Young Pirates	12	0	7	5	13	20	−7	7	
7	Police	12	0	4	8	11	30	−19	4	

Source: https://diskizone.com/table/abc-motsepe-western-cape-log-2020-2021/

== Playoff stage ==
=== Group A ===
Pos	Team	Pld	W	D	L	GF	GA	GD	Pts
1	Glendene United FC	2	1	1	0	4	3	+1	4
2	Mangaung Unite	2	1	0	1	4	4	0	3
3	Umvoti	2	0	1	1	2	3	−1	1

Source: https://diskizone.com/table/abc-motsepe-promotion-playoff-group-a-log-2020-2021/

=== Playoff final ===
Hungry Lions	0 - 0	Platinum City Rovers
Penalties
	5 - 4
