= 1998–99 National First Division =

South African soccer season

National First Division
- Season: 1998–99
- Champions: Thembisa Classic (Inland); African Wanderers (Coastal)
- Promoted: Thembisa Classic, African Wanderers

The 1998–99 National First Division was the 3rd season of the second tier of South African soccer since the reorganisation in 1996.

It consisted of two streams, an Inland stream of 16 teams, and a Coastal stream of 14 teams, reduced from 20 teams apiece the previous season.

The Coastal stream was won by African Wanderers and the Inland stream by Thembisa Classic, with both earning promotion to the 1999–2000 Premier Soccer League.

== Coastal stream ==
=== League table ===
Pos	Team	Pld	W	D	L	GF	GA	GD	Pts	Promotion, qualification or relegation
1	African Wanderers (C, P)	26	17	4	5	40	20	+20	55	Promoted to 1999–2000 Premier Soccer League
2	Avendale Athletico	26	16	3	7	40	23	+17	51	
3	Golden Arrows	26	11	10	5	41	25	+16	43	
4	Saxon Rovers	26	12	7	7	37	25	+12	43	
5	Durban United	26	11	8	7	38	22	+16	41	
6	Cape Town City	26	11	7	8	42	31	+11	40	
7	Newtowns	26	9	11	6	31	32	−1	38	
8	Park United	26	9	7	10	41	39	+2	34	
9	Phoenix City	26	7	10	9	32	37	−5	31	
10	Royal Tigers	26	8	5	13	27	32	−5	29	
11	Trinitarians	26	7	8	11	22	30	−8	29	
12	FC Fortune	26	7	8	11	32	44	−12	29	
13	Bush Bucks	26	7	5	14	22	36	−14	26	
14	Tornado (R)	26	2	3	21	18	67	−49	9	Relegation to 1999–2000 SAFA Second Division

(C) Champions; (P) Promoted; (R) Relegated

== Inland stream ==
=== League table ===
Pos	Team	Pld	W	D	L	GF	GA	GD	Pts	Promotion, qualification or relegation
1	Thembisa Classic (C, P)	30	21	3	6	55	25	+30	66	Promoted to 2000–01 Premier Soccer League
2	Ria Stars	30	16	10	4	48	24	+24	58	
3	Real Rovers	30	17	5	8	54	34	+20	56	
4	Unisaints	30	15	6	9	46	28	+18	51	
5	Young Tigers	30	12	9	9	42	22	+20	45	
6	Sporting	30	14	2	14	47	49	−2	44	
7	Giant Aces	30	13	4	13	35	38	−3	43	
8	Spartak	30	13	3	14	40	36	+4	42	
9	Black Leopards	30	12	6	12	39	37	+2	42	
10	Witbank Aces	30	11	8	11	44	42	+2	41	
11	All Nations	30	11	8	11	29	30	−1	41	
12	Morning Stars	30	9	7	14	36	39	−3	34	
13	City Sharks	30	8	9	13	43	44	−1	33	
14	Mkhuhlu United (R)	30	6	9	15	31	55	−24	27	Relegation to 2000–01 SAFA Second Division
15	Giant Killers (R)	30	7	4	19	36	76	−40	25	Relegation to 2000–01 SAFA Second Division
16	Tsakane Aces (R)	30	2	7	21	11	57	−46	13	Relegation to 2000–01 SAFA Second Division

(C) Champions; (P) Promoted; (R) Relegated
