= Calvin Marlin =

South African footballer

Personal information
- Full name: Calvin Donovan Marlin
- Date of birth: 20 April 1976 (age 50)
- Place of birth: Port Elizabeth, South Africa
- Height: 1.83 m (6 ft 0 in)
- Position: Goalkeeper

Senior career*
Years	Team	Apps	(Gls)
1996–1998	Michau Warriors		
1998–1999	Seven Stars	17	(0)
1999	→ Cape Town Spurs (loan)	11	(0)
1999–2003	Ajax Cape Town	107	(0)
2003–2006	SuperSport United	122	(0)
2006–2013	Mamelodi Sundowns	73	(0)
2013–2015	Mpumalanga Black Aces	0	(0)

International career
2002–2009	South Africa	16	(0)
- * Club domestic league appearances and goals

Calvin Donovan Marlin (born 20 April 1976 in Port Elizabeth, Eastern Cape) is a retired South African football goalkeeper who works as a goalkeeping coach for Cape Town City.

He played club football for Michau Warriors, Seven Stars, Ajax Cape Town, SuperSport United, Mamelodi Sundowns and Mpumalanga Black Aces as well as representing South Africa internationally.

Marlin was a participant at the 2002 FIFA World Cup. He was South Africa's first choice keeper at the 2006 African Nations Cup in Egypt and was capped 16 times.

He kicks left-footed but throws right-handed.

== Coaching career ==
Marlin was appointed assistant coach of Ajax Cape Town in 2017, later becoming interim head coach.

After departing Ajax, he was appointed head coach of Cape Town All Stars and later goalkeeping coach of Cape Town Spurs before departing during the 2023–24 season after Spurs had suffered seven consecutive defeats at the start of the season.
