= Kerjean =

Kerjean may refer to:

== People ==
- Germaine Kerjean (1893–1975), French actress
- Jean-Yves Kerjean (born 1958), French footballer

== Places ==
- Château de Kerjean, Finistère, Brittany, France
