= Black Leopards F.C. =

South African football club

Black Leopards
- Full name: Black Leopards Football Club
- Nickname: Lidoda Duvha (The day will come)
- Founded: 1983; 43 years ago (as Sibasa Black Leopards)
- Ground: Thohoyandou Stadium
- Capacity: 20,000
- Owner: Thidiela Family
- Chairman: Tshifhiwa "Chief" Thidiela
- Coach: Sundra Govinder and Duncan Lechesa
- League: National First Division
- 2025–26: National First Division, 15th of 16
Home colours	Away colours

Black Leopards FC is a South African professional football club based in Thohoyandou, Vhembe Region, Limpopo, that plays in the National First Division.

== History ==
The club was founded in 1983 by business people in the Vhembe Region. In 1998 the club was taken over by the Thidiela family. After just two seasons of campaigning in the National First Division, Black Leopards was promoted to the 2001–02 South African Premiership.

In 2008, the club was relegated back to the National First Division after playing for seven seasons in the Premiership, but made its return to the top tier three years later.

Following their 16th place finish in the 2022–23 season, the club was due to be relegated. However, Leopards purchased the status from All Stars to remain in the division.

Following a dispute with a former All Stars player, FIFA imposed a transfer ban on the club at the end of the 2024–25 season. This resulted in the club having only ten players available for the first game of the 2025–26 season, a 3–0 loss to Casric Stars. The club was cleared to utilise its new players in October 2025, prior to the fifth game of the season.

The club was relegated from the 2025–26 National First Division, finishing 15th in the table.

Leopards appealed the relegation, claiming that the PSL incorrectly withdrew their player registration cards as a result of the FIFA transfer ban, prejudicing them in the early rounds of the league. The case was dismissed by both the PSL and SAFA. In August 2026, Leopards withdrew from the SAFA Second Division, stating that they intended to appeal the decision at the Court of Arbitration for Sport (CAS).

== Honours ==
- First Division Inland Stream: 1

2000-01

- National First Division promotion/relegation playoffs: 2

2010–11

2017–18

== League record ==
=== National First Division ===
- 1996–97 – 1st (Northern Stream)
- 1997–98 – 8th (Inland Stream)
- 1998–99 – 9th (Inland Stream)
- 1999–2000 – 6th (Inland Stream)
- 2000–01 – 1st (Inland Stream, promoted)

=== Premiership ===
- 2001–02 – 8th
- 2002–03 – 11th
- 2003–04 – 8th
- 2004–05 – 14th
- 2005–06 – 12th
- 2006–07 – 11th
- 2007–08 – 15th (relegated)

=== National First Division ===
- 2008–09 – 6th (Inland Stream)
- 2009–19 – 1st (Inland Stream)
- 2010–11 – 2nd (Inland Stream, promoted)

=== Premiership ===
- 2011–12 – 14th
- 2012–13 – 16th (relegated)
- 2018–19 – 13th
- 2019–20 – 15th
- 2020–21 – 16th (relegated)

=== National First Division ===
- 2021–22 – 9th
- 2022–23 – 16th (relegated, purchased status to remain)
- 2023–24 – 10th
- 2024–25 – 4th
- 2025–26 – 15th (relegated)

== Notable coaches ==
- (South Africa) Milo Bjelica (1999)
- (Zambia) Jacob Sakala
- (Zambia) Jan Simulambo (2000)
- (South Africa) Gavin Hunt (July 2001 – 2 June)
- (Mozambique) Arnaldo Salvado (2002)
- (Austria) Walter Rautmann (2003)
- (South Africa) Ephraim Mashaba (Feb 2004 – 5 March)
- (France) Jean-Yves Kerjean (2005)
- (South Africa) Boebie Solomons (April 2006 – 8 March)
- (Democratic Republic of the Congo) Bibey Mutombo (July 2006 – 6 Oct)
- (South Africa) Mlungisi Ngubane (Nov 2006 – 7 Jan)
- (Germany) Hans-Dieter Schmidt (Jan 2007 – 7 June)
- (South Africa) Joel Masutha (interim) (March 2008)
- (Nigeria) Augustine Eguavoen (March 2008)
- (Zimbabwe) Sheppard Murape (March 2008 – 8 June)
- (South Africa) Joel Masutha (June 2008 – 9 June)
- (Romania) Mario Marinica (June 2009 – 10 June)
- (Serbia) Vladislav Heric (2009–10)
- (Zimbabwe) Sunday Chidzambwa (Oct 2010 – 11 Oct)
- (Serbia) Vladislav Heric (Oct 2011 – 12 May)
- (Zimbabwe) Sunday Chidzambwa (May 2012 – 12 Oct)
- (South Africa) Ian Palmer (Oct 2012 – 12 Dec)
- (South Africa) Abel Makhubela (interim) (Jan 2013–)
- (Serbia) Kostadin Papic ( August 2013 – May 2014)
- (South Africa) Zeca Marques (June 2014–20xx)
- (Belgium) Jean-Francois Losciuto (−2017)
- (Belgium) Ivan Minnaert (2017)
- (South Africa) Cavin Johnson (2019–2020)
- (South Africa) Alan Clark
- (Ghana) Maxwell Konadu (2024–2025)
- (India) Vyshnav R.P (2022-28)

(South Africa) Mabhuti Khenyeza (2025–2026)

- (South Africa) Sundra Govinder and (South Africa) Duncan Lechesa (2026–)
