= Lizo =

Lizo is a given name. Notable people with the name include:

- Lizo Gqoboka (born 1990) South African rugby union player
- Lizo Makhosi (born 1999), South African cricketer
- Lizo Mjempu (born 1984), South African footballer
- Lizo Mzimba, English journalist and television presenter
