= Norman Smith (South African soccer) =

South African soccer player

Personal information
- Full name: Norman Ashley Smith
- Date of birth: 25 February 1982 (age 44)
- Place of birth: Kimberley, South Africa
- Height: 1.74 m (5 ft 9 in)
- Position: Striker

Senior career*
| Years | Team | Apps | (Gls) |
| 2004–2005 | Louisvale Pirates | | |
| 2005–2008 | Golden Arrows | 41 | (10) |
| 2008–2009 | Thanda Royal Zulu | 3 | (0) |
| 2009 | Supersport United | 4 | (0) |
| 2009–2010 | Maritzburg United | 10 | (0) |
| 2010–2011 | Jomo Cosmos | 6 | (0) |
| 2011–2012 | United FC | | |
| 2012–2014 | Golden Arrows | 19 | (7) |

International career^{‡}
| 2007 | South Africa | 3 | (0) |
- * Club domestic league appearances and goals as of 13 November 2022 ‡ National team caps and goals as of 13 November 2022

Norman Smith (born 25 February 1982) is a South African soccer player who played two periods for Premier Soccer League club Golden Arrows. He has three caps for the South Africa national soccer team.
