= George Mofokeng =

George Mofokeng may refer to:

- George Mofokeng (soccer) (born 1979)
- George Mofokeng (runner) (born 1979)
