= Miphy Lupini =

Democratic Republic of the Congo footballer

Miphy Lupini (born 20 May 1980 in Kinshasa) is football goalkeeper who last played for Golden Arrows.

Lupini moved to South Africa to play for Durban Stars F.C. in 2003. He joined Mabopane Young Masters before moving to Golden Arrows.

Lupini played for the Democratic Republic of the Congo national football team in a 2002 FIFA World Cup qualification match against Côte d'Ivoire on 29 July 2001.
