= Sici Shelembe =

South African soccer player

Personal information
- Full name: Sici Shelembe
- Date of birth: 10 October 1990 (age 36)
- Place of birth: Msinga, Kwazulu-Natal, South Africa
- Position: Midfielder

Team information
- Current team: Vasco da Gama (on loan from Ajax Cape Town)
- Number: 29

Youth career
- –2011: Ajax Cape Town

Senior career*
Years	Team	Apps	(Gls)
2011–2013	Ajax Cape Town	5	(0)
2012–2013	→ Vasco da Gama (loan)	26	(4)
2013–2014	Witbank Spurs	18	(5)
- * Club domestic league appearances and goals as of 30 March 2014

Sici Shelembe is a South African soccer player who plays as a midfielder in the National First Division for Vasco da Gama, on loan from Ajax Cape Town.

== Career ==
=== Ajax Cape Town ===
Sici Shelembe made his debut for Ajax CT in the 2011-12 season. He scored a goal in his only appearance in the 2011 MTN 8 tournament, and made 5 regular season appearances for the Cape club, during his first season with the A-selection.

==== Vasco da Gama (loan) ====
Sici Shelembe was loaned to the neighboring club Vasco da Gama for the duration of the 2012-13 season, in order to gain more experience and enjoy more playing time, where he will play in the National First Division.
