= Roberto Santo =

South African soccer player

Personal information
- Full name: Roberto Do Espirito Santo
- Date of birth: 7 March 1986 (age 40)
- Place of birth: Cape Town, South Africa
- Height: 1.71 m (5 ft 7 in)
- Position: Right winger

Team information
- Current team: Vasco da Gama
- Number: 20

Youth career
- Vasco da Gama

Senior career*
Years	Team	Apps	(Gls)
–2006	Vasco da Gama	?	(?)
2006–2008	Ajax Cape Town	?	(?)
2008–	Vasco da Gama	?	(?)
- * Club domestic league appearances and goals as of 13 June 2013 ‡ National team caps and goals as of 13 June 2013

Roberto Santo (born 7 March 1986) is a South African football midfielder who plays for National First Division club Vasco da Gama.
