= Pietersburg Pillars =

- Founded: 2000
- Dissolved: 2007
- League: National First Division

Pietersburg Pillars was a South African football club.

The club was renamed City Pillars after the South African government changed the name of the town where the team was based from Pietersberg to Polokwane on 25 February 2005. In December 2006, the franchise was sold to the Morfou brothers who wished to re-introduce the Mpumalanga Black Aces brand to the league following the original club's demise in 2002.

Year	Position	Division	Team name	Played	Won	Drawn	Loss	Goals for	Goals against	Points	Source
2000–01	7	National First Division	Pietersburg Pillars	30	14	4	12	43	37	46	
2001–02	3	National First Division	Pietersburg Pillars	30	19	3	8	53	29	60	
2002–03	3	National First Division	Pietersburg Pillars	30	19	3	8	54	29	60	
2003–04	3	National First Division	Pietersburg Pillars	30	17	7	6	50	28	58	
2004–05	9	National First Division	Pietersburg Pillars	34	11	10	13	43	44	43	
2005–06	2	National First Division	City Pillars	30	17	8	5	57	36	59	
2006–07	5	National First Division	City Pillars	30	13	10	7	53	39	45	
