= Louisvale Pirates =

- Ground: Danie Kuys Stadium, Upington
Home colours

Louisvale Pirates (often misspelt as Louisville Pirates) are a football club from the town of Louisvale in the Northern Cape.

They were promoted from the SAFA Second Division (Vodacom League for sponsorship reasons) in 2004. In the 2004–05 season they were relegated from the National First Division.

Until Hungry Lions in 2021, they were the only team from the Northern Cape province to play in the PSL.
