= Arnaldo Salvado =

Mozambican football manager (born 1959)

Personal information
- Full name: Arnaldo José da Silva Salvado
- Date of birth: 27 January 1959 (age 67)
- Place of birth: Quelimane, Mozambique

Managerial career
- Years: Team
- 1983–1986: Clube Ferroviário Pemba
- 1990–1994: CD Costa do Sol
- 1995–2001: Clube Ferroviário de Maputo
- 1997–2000: Mozambique
- 2001–2002: Black Leopards FC
- 2003: CD Maxaquene
- 2005–2006: CD Costa do Sol
- 2008–2009: Atlético Muçulmano da Matola
- 2010–2014: CD Maxaquene
- 2014: CD Costa do Sol
- 2016–2017: Clube Ferroviário de Nampula

Arnaldo José da Silva Salvado (born 27 January 1959) is a Mozambican former football manager who last managed Clube Ferroviário de Nampula.

== Life and career ==
Salvado was born on 27 January 1959 in Quelimane, Mozambique. He studied civil engineering. He has been described as a "temperamental man". In 1983, he was appointed manager of Mozambican side Clube Ferroviário Pemba. In 1990, he was appointed manager of Mozambican side CD Costa do Sol. In 1995, he was appointed manager of Mozambican side Clube Ferroviário de Maputo. In 1997, he was appointed manager of the Mozambique national football team. In 2001, he was appointed manager of South African side Black Leopards FC. In 2003, he was appointed manager of Mozambican side CD Maxaquene.

In 2005, he returned as manager of Mozambican side CD Costa do Sol. In 2008, he was appointed manager of Mozambican side Atlético Muçulmano da Matola. In 2010, he returned as manager of Mozambican side CD Maxaquene. In 2014, he returned as manager of Mozambican side CD Costa do Sol for the second time. In 2016, he was appointed manager of Mozambican side Clube Ferroviário de Nampula. He has been regarded as one of the most decorated managers in Mozambican football.
