= SJ Smith Stadium =

Building in South Africa

- Interactive map of SJ Smith Stadium
- Location: 133 Lower Marine Parade, Lamontville district, Chatsworth, Durban, KwaZulu-Natal, South Africa
- Owner: eThekwini Municipality
- Operator: eThekwini Municipality
- Capacity: N/A
- Surface: Grass

Construction
- Groundbreaking: 29.949160°S 30.951390°E
- Renovated: 2008

Tenants
- Durban Stars, African Wanderers

SJ Smith Stadium is a multi-use stadium at the Lamontville district, in the Chatsworth suburb of Durban, situated in the KwaZulu-Natal province of South Africa. It is currently used mostly for football matches, and was the home venue of Durban Stars and African Wanderers during the 2010-11 season of Vodacom League.

== Recently implemented upgrades ==
The stadium received a major upgrade in 2008, in order for it to comply with FIFA standards for "training venues", ahead of the 2010 FIFA World Cup. Upgrading the stadium costed 18.8 million Rand, and provided the following improvements:

- New improved walling and fencing around the stadium.
- Installation of a PA system.
- New grandstand, including medical facilities, VOC, JOC and VIP area.
- Demolished area around the stadium to create additional seating area, on the northern and southern side of the stadium.
- "Dug outs" for reserve players.
- Improved floodlighting.
- A formal pitch irrigation and drainage system.
