= Vasili Sofiadellis =

South African soccer player

Vasili Sofiadellis is a South African former soccer player who played as a midfielder.

== Career ==
Sofiadellis started his career with South African side Bloemfontein Celtic. He debuted for the club at the age of fifteen. Sofiadellis was described as one of the Bloemfontein Celtic's "most talented players from the 1990s". After that, he signed for South African side AmaZulu.

== Personal life ==
After retiring from professional football, Sofiadellis worked as an accountant. He also worked as an entrepreneur.
