= 2024 Carling Knockout Cup =

Tournament details
- Country: South Africa
- Dates: 18 October 2024 – 23 November 2024
- Teams: 16

Final positions
- Champions: Magesi
- Runners-up: Mamelodi Sundowns

The 2024 Carling Knockout Cup is the second season of the South African association football competition, the Carling Knockout Cup, under its new sponsored name. It was organised by the Premier Soccer League and Carling and ran from October 2024.

== Teams ==
The teams consisted of the 16 teams from the 2024–25 South African Premiership.

- AmaZulu
- Cape Town City
- Chippa United
- Golden Arrows
- Kaizer Chiefs
- Magesi
- Mamelodi Sundowns
- Marumo Gallants
- Orlando Pirates
- Polokwane City
- Royal AM
- Richards Bay
- Sekhukhune United
- Stellenbosch
- SuperSport United
- TS Galaxy

== Round of 16 ==
18 October 2024
19:00

| AmaZulu | 1–2 | Stellenbosch |

Durban
19 October 2024
15:00

| Orlando Pirates | 2–3 | Magesi |
|---|---|---|
| Dlamini 86'; Makgopa 89' | Report | Abrahams 33'; Sasane 39'(O.G); Chirambadare |

Soweto
19 October 2024
15:00

| Polokwane City | 2–3 | Marumo Gallants |

19 October 2024
18:00

| Mamelodi Sundowns | 5–0 | Golden Arrows |
|---|---|---|
| Morena 14'; Rayners 25'; Mvala; Shalulile; Letlhaku | Report |

19 October 2024
20:00

| Cape Town City | 3–0 | Royal AM |

19 October 2024
20:00

| SuperSport United | 0–4 | Kaizer Chiefs |
|---|---|---|
| | Report |

20 October 2024
15:00

| TS Galaxy | 1–0 (a.e.t.) | Chippa United |
|---|---|---|
| Zajmovic 14' | Report |

Mbombela Stadium, Mbombela
20 October 2024
17:30

| Richards Bay | 1–0 | Sekhukhune United |
|---|---|---|
| Mabuya 42' | Report |

King Zwelithini Stadium, Durban

== Quarter Finals ==
2 November 2024
15:00 SAST

| Richards Bay | 0–0 (a.e.t.) | Cape Town City |
Penalties
| | 5–4 |

King Zwelithini Stadium
2 November 2024
18:00 SAST

| Kaizer Chiefs | 0–4 | Mamelodi Sundowns |
|---|---|---|
| | | Rayners 14' (pen.) 22'; Shalulile; Mudau |

FNB Stadium
3 November 2024
15:00 SAST

| TS Galaxy | 0–1 | Magesi |
|---|---|---|
| | | Mokone 44' |

Mbombela Stadium
3 November 2024
15:00 SAST

| Marumo Gallants | 1–0 | Stellenbosch |
|---|---|---|
| Shai 17' |

Thohoyandou Stadium

== Semi-Finals ==
9 November 2024
15:00

| Magesi | 1-0 | Richards Bay F.C. |
|---|---|---|
| Mashigo 27' |

King Zwelithini Stadium, Umlazi
10 November 2024
15:00

| Marumo Gallants | 0-2 | Mamelodi Sundowns |
|---|---|---|
| | | Ribeiro 53' (pen.); Maema 90+4' |

Dr. Petrus Molemela Stadium, Bloemfontein

== Final ==
23 November 2024
18:00

| Magesi | 2–1 | Mamelodi Sundowns |
|---|---|---|
| Kakora 48' Abrahams 87' | Report | Rayners 36' |

Free State Stadium, Bloemfontein
