= Michau Warriors F.C. =

Michau Warriors
- Full name: Michau Warriors Football Club
- Nickname(s): Warriors
- Founded: 1996
- Dissolved: 1998
- Ground: Port Elizabeth

Michau Warriors was a South African soccer club.

They played in the inaugural 1996–97 season of the Premiership, where they were relegated to the National First Division (NFD) after finishing in 17th place. The club was relegated after relegation rivals AmaZulu were awarded an additional two points by the governing Premier Soccer League after AmaZulu protested that two players from their drawn game with Bush Bucks had failed to produce identity documents. Warriors lost their appeal against this decision, and as a result were relegated.

The following 1997–98 season they finished second in the NFD coastal stream.

The club was based in Port Elizabeth.

Warriors experienced financial difficulties after owner Michau Huiseman was arrested in the United Kingdom, allegedly for smuggling marijuana, and the club disbanded prior to the start of the 1998–99 season.
