= David Kannemeyer =

South African soccer player

Personal information
- Full name: David Charles Kannemeyer
- Date of birth: 8 July 1977 (age 49)
- Place of birth: Cape Town, South Africa
- Height: 1.79 m (5 ft 10 in)
- Position: Left back

Senior career*
Years	Team	Apps	(Gls)
1995–1999	Cape Town Spurs	118	(12)
1999–2001	Ajax Cape Town	66	(3)
2001–2004	Kaizer Chiefs	41	(3)
2004–2008	Mamelodi Sundowns	45	(1)
2008–2011	SuperSport United	39	(0)
2011–2012	Mpumalanga Black Aces		

International career
2000–2006	South Africa	15	(0)
- * Club domestic league appearances and goals

David Kannemeyer (born 8 July 1977) is a South African former professional soccer player who played as a left back. He played for Cape Town Spurs, Ajax Cape Town, Kaizer Chiefs, Mamelodi Sundowns, SuperSport United and Mpumalanga Black Aces, and he also played for the South Africa national team.

== Club career ==
Kannemeyer was a founding member of Ajax Cape Town when Cape Town Spurs and Seven Stars amalgamated in 1999. In 2001, he moved to Kaizer Chiefs for R700 000.
