= Nathan Gertse =

South African footballer

Personal information
- Date of birth: 17 September 1991 (age 35)
- Place of birth: Cape Town, South Africa
- Position: Centre back

Youth career
- –2011: Ajax Cape Town

Senior career*
Years	Team	Apps	(Gls)
2011–2013	Ajax Cape Town	2	(0)
2012–2013	→ Vasco da Gama (loan)	16	(4)
2013–2016	Vasco da Gama	97	(7)
2017	Santos FC	13	(0)
2017–2018	Cape Town All Stars	24	(1)
2018–2019	Chippa United		
2019–	Ubuntu Cape Town	10	(0)
2019–2020	Cape Umoya United	15	(0)
- * Club domestic league appearances and goals as of 13 November 2022

Nathan Gertse is a South African soccer player who last played as a defender in the National First Division for Cape Umoya United.
