= Cyrille Mubiala =

Congolese footballer

Personal information
- Full name: Cyrille Mubiala Kitambala
- Date of birth: 7 July 1974 (age 52)
- Place of birth: Kinshasa, Zaire
- Height: 1.74 m (5 ft 9 in)
- Position: Defender

Senior career*
Years	Team	Apps	(Gls)
1998–1999	CS Style du Congo	28	(0)
1999–2000	AS Dragons	27	(1)
2000–2004	AS Vita Club	88	(7)
2004–2006	Ajax Cape Town	65	(7)
2006–2008	Bloemfontein Celtic	52	(3)
Total		260	(18)

International career
2002–2006	DR Congo	23	(2)
- * Club domestic league appearances and goals

Cyrille Mubiala Kitambala (born 7 July 1974) is a Congolese former footballer who played as a defender.

He was part of the DR Congo squad for the 2004 African Cup of Nations, as well as for the 2006 Africa Cup of Nations.

Scores and results list DR Congo's goal tally first, score column indicates score after each Mubiala goal.

List of international goals scored by Cyrille Mubiala
No.	Date	Venue	Opponent	Score	Result	Competition	Ref.
1	25 August 2002	Brazzaville, Republic of the Congo	Congo	2–1	3–1	Friendly	
2	4 September 2005	Stade des Martyrs, Kinshasa, Democratic Republic of the Congo	Cape Verde	1–0	2–1	2006 FIFA World Cup qualification	
