= Alan Clark (football manager) =

South African football manager (born 1980)

Personal information
- Date of birth: 26 February 1980 (age 46)
- Place of birth: Benoni, South Africa

Managerial career
- Years: Team
- 2013: Sundowns (youth)
- 2013–2015: SuperSport United (assistant)
- 2017: Kosovo U21 (advisor)
- 2017–2020: AmaZulu (assistant)
- 2020: Black Leopards
- 2020–2021: Llapi (assistant)
- 2021–: Kosovo U21 (assistant)

Alan Clark (born 26 February 1980) is a South African football manager who is an assistant manager of the Kosovo national under-21 football team.

== Life and career ==
Clark was born on 26 February 1980 in Benoni, South Africa. He obtained a UEFA Pro License. In 2013, he was appointed as a youth manager of South African side Sundowns. After that, he was appointed as an assistant manager of South African side SuperSport United. In 2017, he was appointed as an advisor for the Kosovo national under-21 football team. He also worked as an advisor for the Kosovo national under-17 football team. After that, he was appointed as an assistant manager of South African side AmaZulu.

In 2020, he was appointed manager of South African side Black Leopards. He became the seventh youngest manager in professional football worldwide at the time. He was described as helped them "play good football" while managing the club. He helped them reach the quarter-finals of the 2019–20 Nedbank Cup. After that, he was appointed as an assistant manager of Kosovan side Llapi. He also worked as a youth manager for the club. In 2021, he returned to the Kosovo national under-21 football team as an assistant manager. After that, he worked for Harrow International School in China.
