= La Masia F.C. =

- Nickname: La Masia
- Ground: Education Through Sports
- League: SAFA Second Division (Gauteng Stream)
- 2025–26: 1st

La Masia (known as MM Platinum prior to 2022) is a South African football club based in Westbury, Johannesburg that plays in the SAFA Second Division.

The club gained promotion to the 2022–23 National First Division after winning the 2021–22 SAFA Second Division, winning Gauteng Stream B as well as the playoffs, defeating Magesi in the final. La Masia was relegated at the end of the 2023–24 National First Division season.

== League record ==
=== SAFA Second Division Gauteng Division ===
- 2019–20 – 5th
- 2020–21 – 9th (Stream A)
- 2021–22 – 1st (Stream B)

=== National First Division ===
- 2022–23 – 13th
- 2023–24 – 15th (relegated)

=== SAFA Second Division Gauteng Division ===
- 2024–25 – 3rd of 18
- 2025–26 – 1st of 18

== Honours ==
- SAFA Second Division
  - Champions (1): 2021–22
- SAFA Second Division (Gauteng Stream)
  - Champions (2): 2021–22, 2025–26
