= Dillon Sheppard =

South African soccer coach and former player

Personal information
- Date of birth: 27 February 1979 (age 47)
- Place of birth: Durban, South Africa
- Height: 1.80 m (5 ft 11 in)
- Position: Left winger

Team information
- Current team: Kaizer Chiefs (assistant)

Youth career
- School of Excellence
- Barcelona

Senior career*
Years	Team	Apps	(Gls)
1997–1999	Seven Stars	24	(1)
1999–2004	Ajax Cape Town	105	(15)
2004	Dynamo Moscow	4	(0)
2005–2006	Panionios	10	(0)
2006–2009	Mamelodi Sundowns	37	(1)
2009–2011	Platinum Stars	39	(12)
2011–2013	Golden Arrows	33	(4)
2013–2014	Maritzburg United	27	(0)
2014–2017	Bidvest Wits	19	(0)

International career
1996	South Africa U17	24	(12)
1997–1999	South Africa U20	9	(0)
2000–2002	South Africa U23	9	(0)
2000–2007	South Africa	32	(11)

Managerial career
- 2016–2020: Bidvest Wits (youth)
- 2020–: Kaizer Chiefs (assistant)
- * Club domestic league appearances and goals

Dillon Sheppard (born 27 February 1979) is a South African soccer coach and a former player who played as a left winger. He is an assistant coach of South African team Kaizer Chiefs.
