= 2021–22 SAFA Second Division =

SAFA Second Division
- Season: 2021–22
- Champions: MM Platinum
- Promoted: MM Platinum, Magesi F.C.

The 2021–22 SAFA Second Division (known as the ABC Motsepe League for sponsorship reasons) was the 24th season of the SAFA Second Division, the third tier for South African association football clubs, since its establishment in 1998. Due to the size of South Africa, the competition was split into nine divisions, one for each region. After the league stage of the regional competition was completed, the nine winning teams of each regional division entered the playoffs.

MM Platinum beat Magesi F.C. 1-0 in the final, with both teams earning promotion to the 2022–23 National First Division. As winners, MM Platinum earned R1.25 million in prize money, while Magesi earned R600,000.

== Regions ==
=== Eastern Cape ===
==== Stream A ====
Pos	Team	Pld	W	D	L	GF	GA	GD	Pts	Qualification or relegation
1	Spear of the Nation	16	15	1	0	32	8	+24	46	Playoffs
2	Amavarara	16	8	4	4	22	14	+8	28	
3	Bizana Pondo Chiefs	16	8	3	5	21	15	+6	27	
4	Highbury FC	16	7	3	6	26	26	0	24	
5	Bush Bucks	16	5	3	8	21	25	−4	18	
6	Seven Stars	16	5	2	9	13	25	−12	17	
7	Sibaya All Stars	16	3	6	7	16	25	−9	15	
8	FC Siyanda	16	4	2	10	14	18	−4	14	
9	Bisho Stars	16	3	4	9	15	24	−9	13	

Source: https://diskizone.com/leagues/abc-motsepe-eastern-cape-stream-a-151?seasonID=8

==== Stream B ====
Pos	Team	Pld	W	D	L	GF	GA	GD	Pts	Qualification or relegation
1	BCM Stars	16	11	4	1	38	12	+26	37	Playoffs
2	Sinenkani	15	9	5	1	34	9	+25	32	
3	AmaMpondo United	16	8	5	3	30	19	+11	29	
4	Thohoyandou FC	16	7	5	4	25	23	+2	26	
5	Matta Milan	16	5	6	5	14	24	−10	21	
6	Bush Pirates	16	5	2	9	17	25	−8	17	
7	Lion City	15	4	4	7	18	26	−8	16	
8	Birmingham City	16	2	3	11	15	36	−21	9	
9	Swartkops Valley United Brothers	14	1	2	11	13	30	−17	5	

Source: https://diskizone.com/leagues/abc-motsepe-eastern-cape-stream-b-152?seasonID=8

=== Free State ===
==== Stream A ====
Pos	Team	Pld	W	D	L	GF	GA	GD	Pts	Qualification or relegation
1	Dikwena United	16	13	2	1	29	7	+22	41	Playoffs
2	D General FC	16	12	3	1	37	14	+23	39	
3	Super Eagles	16	9	4	3	30	15	+15	31	
4	Mathaithai	16	6	4	6	13	19	−6	22	
5	FC Matjhabeng	16	5	5	6	21	29	−8	20	
6	Central University	16	3	4	9	19	25	−6	13	
7	Small Tigers	16	3	4	9	22	29	−7	13	
8	Clever Boys	16	3	3	10	8	24	−16	12	
9	Kovsies	16	2	3	11	11	28	−17	9	

Source: https://diskizone.com/leagues/abc-motsepe-free-state-stream-a-8?seasonID=8

==== Stream B ====
Pos	Team	Pld	W	D	L	GF	GA	GD	Pts	Qualification or relegation
1	Bloemfontein Celtic Development	16	13	3	0	38	8	+30	42	Playoffs
2	FC Black Cross	16	10	3	3	38	11	+27	33	
3	Sibanye Golden Stars	16	9	3	4	37	27	+10	30	
4	Bloemfontein Young Tigers	16	6	3	7	31	27	+4	21	
5	Marquard Dynamos	16	5	5	6	15	20	−5	20	
6	Excelsior United	16	5	2	9	13	35	−22	17	
7	African Warriors	16	5	1	10	16	27	−11	16	
8	FC Spartans	16	3	3	10	16	30	−14	12	
9	Harmony FC	16	3	3	10	14	33	−19	12	

Source: https://diskizone.com/leagues/abc-motsepe-free-state-stream-b-9?seasonID=8

=== Gauteng ===
==== Stream A ====
Pos	Team	Pld	W	D	L	GF	GA	GD	Pts	Qualification or relegation
1	African All Stars	16	10	2	4	20	10	+10	32	Playoffs
2	Hollywood Thunder	16	9	4	3	22	13	+9	31	
3	JBM FC	16	8	6	2	22	13	+9	30	
4	Wits University	16	7	4	5	28	21	+7	25	
5	Senaoane Gunners	16	7	4	5	16	14	+2	25	
6	Dube Continental	16	6	3	7	28	24	+4	21	
7	Tembisa Sports Centre	16	6	2	8	17	24	−7	20	
8	Vaal Professionals	16	4	0	12	15	35	−20	12	
9	NMVU Vaal	16	2	1	13	13	27	−14	7	

Source: https://diskizone.com/leagues/abc-motsepe-gauteng-stream-a-63?seasonID=8

==== Stream B ====
Pos	Team	Pld	W	D	L	GF	GA	GD	Pts	Qualification or relegation
1	MM Platinum	16	9	5	2	23	11	+12	32	Playoffs
2	Highlands Park	16	9	3	4	23	11	+12	30	
3	Dondol Stars	16	8	4	4	26	16	+10	28	
4	Pele Pele	16	6	5	5	23	22	+1	23	
5	Casric F.C.	16	5	6	5	18	12	+6	21	
6	Mamelodi Newcastle	16	4	5	7	20	33	−13	17	
7	Leruma United	16	3	6	7	13	19	−6	15	
8	M Tigers	16	3	5	8	14	25	−11	14	
9	Mamelodi All Stars	16	2	7	7	16	27	−11	13	

Source: https://diskizone.com/leagues/abc-motsepe-gauteng-stream-b-64?seasonID=8

=== Kwazulu-Natal ===
==== Stream A ====
Pos	Team	Pld	W	D	L	GF	GA	GD	Pts	Qualification or relegation
1	Summerfield Dynamos	18	13	3	2	40	9	+31	42	Playoffs
2	Milford FC	18	11	5	2	23	8	+15	38	
3	Njampela FC	18	11	2	5	34	12	+22	35	
4	Muzi King Masters	18	9	3	6	24	16	+8	30	
5	Happy Wanderers	18	9	3	6	18	15	+3	30	
6	Asande FC	18	8	4	6	21	27	−6	28	
7	Real Magic	18	5	5	8	16	36	−20	20	
8	Stone Breakers	18	5	2	11	13	24	−11	17	
9	Durban Pioneers	18	4	2	12	18	34	−16	14	
10	Nongoma FC	18	0	1	17	9	35	−26	1	

Source: https://diskizone.com/leagues/abc-motsepe-kwazulu-natal-stream-a-20?seasonID=8

==== Stream B ====
Pos	Team	Pld	W	D	L	GF	GA	GD	Pts	Qualification or relegation
1	GWP Friends	18	14	1	3	32	16	+16	43	Playoffs
2	uMsinga United	18	12	5	1	39	13	+26	41	
3	Umvoti	18	12	3	3	30	10	+20	39	
4	Newcastle All Stars	18	10	2	6	26	20	+6	32	
5	Midlands Wanderers	18	7	3	8	26	20	+6	24	
6	Mkhambathi FC	18	5	7	6	14	16	−2	22	
7	Classic FC	18	5	5	8	17	23	−6	20	
8	Ethekwini Coastal	18	2	6	10	12	28	−16	12	
9	XI Experience	18	2	5	11	11	40	−29	11	
10	Running Water	18	1	3	14	16	37	−21	6	

Source: https://diskizone.com/table/abc-motsepe-kzn-stream-b-log-2021-2022/

=== Limpopo ===
==== Stream A ====
Pos	Team	Pld	W	D	L	GF	GA	GD	Pts	Qualification or relegation
1	Mpheni Home Defenders	16	9	5	2	29	14	+15	32	Playoffs
2	Musina United	16	9	2	5	16	9	+7	29	
3	Ablex United	16	8	3	5	20	21	−1	27	
4	Giyani Happy Boys	16	6	5	5	19	21	−2	23	
5	Mikhado FC	16	6	3	7	24	18	+6	21	
6	Munaca FC	16	6	3	7	18	18	0	21	
7	Emmanuel FC	16	5	4	7	20	27	−7	19	
8	Vondwe XI Bullets	16	6	0	10	20	25	−5	18	
9	Blackpool	16	2	5	9	12	25	−13	11	

Source: https://diskizone.com/leagues/abc-motsepe-limpopo-stream-a-18?seasonID=8

==== Stream B ====
Pos	Team	Pld	W	D	L	GF	GA	GD	Pts	Qualification or relegation
1	Magesi F.C.	16	14	1	1	36	12	+24	43	Playoffs
2	The Dolphins	16	10	1	5	25	11	+14	31	
3	Ngwaabe City Motors FC	16	7	6	3	29	16	+13	27	
4	Phinnet F.C.	16	7	3	6	15	18	−3	24	
5	Mighty F.C.	16	6	3	7	27	26	+1	21	
6	Eleven Fast Tigers	16	5	4	7	17	21	−4	19	
7	Ditlou F.C.	16	5	3	8	13	18	−5	18	
8	Tubatse United	16	5	3	8	19	27	−8	18	
9	Dennilton Callies	16	0	2	14	14	46	−32	2	

Source: https://diskizone.com/leagues/abc-motsepe-limpopo-stream-b-19?seasonID=8

=== Mpumalanga ===
==== Stream A ====
Pos	Team	Pld	W	D	L	GF	GA	GD	Pts	Qualification or relegation
1	Secunda M Stars	16	12	2	2	30	11	+19	38	Playoffs
2	Sivutsa Stars	16	9	3	4	33	18	+15	30	
3	Mlambo Royal Cubs	16	9	3	4	27	14	+13	30	
4	Destiny College	16	8	6	2	24	11	+13	30	
5	Fernie Battalion FC	16	8	3	5	27	21	+6	27	
6	Witbank Citylads	16	3	4	9	16	29	−13	13	
7	Witbank Shepard	16	3	4	9	16	29	−13	13	
8	Gemsbok Classic	16	3	4	9	15	33	−18	13	
9	Lekazi Brothers FC	16	0	5	11	14	36	−22	5	

Source: https://diskizone.com/leagues/abc-motsepe-mpumalanga-stream-a-50?seasonID=8

==== Stream B ====
Pos	Team	Pld	W	D	L	GF	GA	GD	Pts	Qualification or relegation
1	Sabie Bayern	16	13	2	1	44	10	+34	41	Playoffs
2	Kriel Football Academy	16	11	3	2	34	14	+20	36	
3	Passion FC	16	8	4	4	31	18	+13	28	
4	Kanyamazane All Stars	16	6	5	5	34	16	+18	23	
5	Phaphama FC	16	6	5	5	28	25	+3	23	
6	BTM Sports	16	6	3	7	22	22	0	21	
7	Bakoena Chiefs	16	3	5	8	22	29	−7	14	
8	Mathithiya FCs	16	3	1	12	14	38	−24	10	
9	FC Benfica	16	1	2	13	12	69	−57	5	

Source: https://diskizone.com/leagues/abc-motsepe-mpumalanga-stream-b-51?seasonID=8

=== North West ===
==== Stream A ====
Pos	Team	Pld	W	D	L	GF	GA	GD	Pts	Qualification or relegation
1	Orbit College	16	12	2	2	37	11	+26	38	Playoffs
2	Thaba Tshwane FC	16	8	5	3	20	14	+6	29	
3	FC Maginim	16	8	3	5	27	19	+8	27	
4	Army Rockets FC	16	6	7	3	29	25	+4	25	
5	Maboloka United	16	5	5	6	20	23	−3	20	
6	Kgositlile FC	16	5	4	7	18	23	−5	19	
7	NWU Tawana	16	4	5	7	22	29	−7	17	
8	Stilfontein Real Hearts	16	3	5	8	18	25	−7	14	
9	Captain Eleven	16	3	0	13	13	35	−22	9	

Source: https://diskizone.com/leagues/abc-motsepe-north-west-stream-a-59?seasonID=8

==== Stream B ====
Pos	Team	Pld	W	D	L	GF	GA	GD	Pts	Qualification or relegation
1	North West University	16	10	4	2	35	15	+20	34	Playoffs
2	Black Eagles	16	9	5	2	40	5	+35	32	
3	FC Maberethe	16	10	2	4	30	18	+12	32	
4	TUT FC	16	7	7	2	41	12	+29	28	
5	Tigane United	16	5	4	7	15	39	−24	19	
6	Taung Mega Stars	16	4	5	7	22	33	−11	17	
7	City Rovers	16	5	2	9	21	32	−11	17	
8	Red Lions	16	5	0	11	25	41	−16	15	
9	Ally's Tigers	16	2	1	13	16	50	−34	7	

Source: https://diskizone.com/leagues/abc-motsepe-north-west-stream-b-60?seasonID=8

=== Northern Cape ===
==== Stream A ====
Pos	Team	Pld	W	D	L	GF	GA	GD	Pts	Qualification or relegation
1	Upington City	16	12	4	0	43	9	+34	40	Playoffs
2	NC Professionals	16	12	3	1	51	5	+46	39	
3	His Desire Sports Academy	16	9	2	5	30	21	+9	29	
4	Olympics	16	8	3	5	33	35	−2	27	
5	Kakamas Juventus	16	7	3	6	25	20	+5	24	
6	Kakamas Sundowns	16	6	2	8	24	31	−7	20	
7	Tornado FC	16	5	1	10	21	30	−9	16	
8	Olifantshoek Young Stars	16	3	1	12	13	37	−24	10	
9	Mainstay United	16	0	1	15	12	64	−52	1	

Source: https://diskizone.com/leagues/abc-motsepe-northern-cape-stream-a-25?seasonID=8

==== Stream B ====
Pos	Team	Pld	W	D	L	GF	GA	GD	Pts	Qualification or relegation
1	Real Madrid	16	10	4	2	31	17	+14	34	Playoffs
2	Colville United	16	9	5	2	28	12	+16	32	
3	Zoo Movement FC	16	6	3	7	28	27	+1	21	
4	Tsantshabane Stars FC	16	5	6	5	21	21	0	21	
5	Kuruman Scorpions	16	4	7	5	21	24	−3	19	
6	United Rovers	16	5	3	8	24	30	−6	18	
7	NC Liverpool	16	4	6	6	18	24	−6	18	
8	Rasta Far Eagles	16	4	4	8	22	30	−8	16	
9	Kuruman Kicks	16	4	4	8	20	28	−8	16	

Source: https://diskizone.com/leagues/abc-motsepe-northern-cape-stream-b-26?seasonID=8

=== Western Cape ===
==== Stream A ====
Pos	Team	Pld	W	D	L	GF	GA	GD	Pts	Qualification or relegation
1	Zizwe United	19	14	3	2	41	7	+34	45	Playoffs
2	Grassy Park United	19	13	2	4	33	13	+20	41	
3	Ubuntu Cape Town	20	12	2	6	46	24	+22	38	
4	Clarewood JPM FC	19	10	3	6	38	27	+11	33	
5	Santos	17	9	3	5	29	18	+11	30	
6	Mbekweni Sundowns	19	8	6	5	35	25	+10	30	
7	Cape Town Spurs Youth	17	6	4	7	23	22	+1	22	
8	Royal Blues	19	6	1	12	23	46	−23	19	
9	Jomos Power	20	5	2	13	25	58	−33	17	
10	Black Cats	19	3	4	12	20	38	−18	13	
11	Gansbaai City	20	3	0	17	14	49	−35	9	

Source: https://diskizone.com/leagues/abc-motsepe-western-cape-stream-a-10?seasonID=8

==== Stream B ====
Pos	Team	Pld	W	D	L	GF	GA	GD	Pts	Qualification or relegation
1	FN Rangers	18	14	3	1	44	15	+29	45	Playoffs
2	Glendene United	18	12	5	1	56	18	+38	41	
3	Trojan United	18	11	2	5	36	20	+16	35	
4	Hout Bay United	18	8	9	1	36	16	+20	33	
5	Norway Parks Magic	18	7	5	6	34	29	+5	26	
6	Cape Town Hotspurs	18	6	5	7	23	20	+3	23	
7	Ikapa Sporting	18	4	4	10	20	30	−10	16	
8	Maties FC	18	3	6	9	28	27	+1	15	
9	Police	18	3	2	13	19	50	−31	11	
10	Langebaan FC	18	1	1	16	13	84	−71	4	

Source: https://diskizone.com/leagues/abc-motsepe-western-cape-stream-b-11?seasonID=8

== Playoff stage ==
=== Semi-finals ===
June 2022

MM Platinum	1 - 0	Spear of the Nation
	Report

Olën Park
June 2022

Magesi	2 - 1	North West University
	Report

Olën Park

=== Playoff final ===
June 2022

MM Platinum	1 - 0	Magesi
	Report

Olën Park
