= Bloemfontein Young Tigers =

- Ground: Air Force Base, Bloemfontein, Free State
- Capacity: N/A
- Owner: Mr Khoroai
- Chairman: Mr Khoroai
- Manager: Coach Chuku
- League: SAFA Regional League, Free State
- 2025–26: 1st

Bloemfontein Young Tigers are a South African football (soccer) club based in Bloemfontein that participates in the SAFA Regional Division.

== History ==
The club was formed in 1925 and plays their home matches at Air Force Base.

Their most successful season was when they finished second in the Inland Stream of the 2000–01 National First Division.

== League results ==
=== National First Division ===
- 1998–99 – 5th (Inland Stream)
- 1999–2000 – 4th (Inland Stream)
- 2000–01 – 2nd (Inland Stream)
- 2001–02 – 5th (Inland Stream)
- 2002–03 – 6th (Inland Stream)
- 2003–04 – 4th (Inland Stream)
- 2004–05 – 10th
- 2005–06 – 16th (relegated)

=== SAFA Second Division (Free State Stream) ===
- 2015–16 – 6th
- 2016–17 – 3rd
- 2017–18 – 2nd
- 2018–19 – 2nd
- 2019–20 – 4th
- 2020–21 Stream A – 5th
- 2021–22 Stream B – 4th
- 2022–23 Stream B – 7th
- 2023–24 Stream A – 9th
- 2024–25 Group 1B – 7th
- 2025–26 Group 1B – 15th

== Notable former players ==
- Kagisho Dikgacoi
- Thabang Rakhosi
