= Alcardo van Graan =

South African soccer player

Personal information
- Full name: Alcardo van Graan
- Date of birth: 22 June 1986 (age 40)
- Place of birth: Cape Town, South Africa
- Height: 1.77 m (5 ft 10 in)
- Positions: Striker; center forward

Youth career
- Idas Valley AFC
- Nelsons FC
- Maties
- Battswood FC
- Western Province United

Senior career*
Years	Team	Apps	(Gls)
2010–11	Milano United	32	(31)
2011–14	Ajax Cape Town	20	(1)
2013	→ Milano United (loan)	0	(0)
2014	Maties	0	(0)
- * Club domestic league appearances and goals as of 2 March 2014

Alcardo van Graan (born 22 June 1986) is a South African professional soccer player, who last played as a forward for South African club Maties and is currently a free agent.

== Club career ==
=== Early career ===
Alcardo van Graan grew up playing at youth level for various clubs around Cape Town, in South Africa's Western Cape, including Idas Valley AFC, Nelsons FC, Maties FC, Battswood FC and Western Province United.

=== Milano United ===
He made his professional debut with Milano United in the 2011-2012 season, where he scored 31 goals for the club from Grassy Park, playing in the Vodacom League, the second tier of professional football in South Africa. Alcardo played a strong season that year, which brought him to the attention of the bigger South African clubs from the PSL, of which Ajax Cape Town signed the young forward.

=== Ajax Cape Town ===
Picked up by Ajax CT in the summer of 2012, after an impressive showing the previous season in the Second Division, Alcardo van Graan played in the MTN 8 and scored on his Premier Soccer League debut for Ajax Cape Town. He would go on to make a total of twelve appearances for the Cape club that year, having only found the back of the net once.

On 21 July 2012, during a friendly encounter against his favorite club Manchester United, Alcardo scored the opening goal after his first contact with a lovely backheel touch. Manchester United would eventually level the score with the match ending in a 1-1 draw in Cape Town. When asked about this luck of scoring on his all-time favorite team, Alcardo expressed having to still pinch himself after the match.

==== Milano United (loan) ====
After eight regular season appearances for Ajax CT during the 2012-13 season without scoring, Alcardo was loaned back to the club from which they recruited him on 4 February 2013, for the remainder of the season.

==== Maties ====
In 2014 van Graan represented Stellenbosch University. He played in the Nedbank Cup.
