= Nhlanhla Shabalala =

South African soccer player

Personal information
- Full name: Enoch Nhlanhla Shabalala
- Date of birth: 16 December 1985 (age 40)
- Place of birth: Villiers, South Africa
- Height: 1.68 m (5 ft 6 in)
- Position: Central midfielder

Youth career
- Paradise
- Remember
- Early Birds
- Ajax Cape Town

Senior career*
Years	Team	Apps	(Gls)
2002–2014	Ajax Cape Town	106	(1)
2013–2015	AmaZulu	23	(0)
2015–2016	Moroka Swallows	7	(0)
- * Club domestic league appearances and goals

Nhlanhla Shabalala (born 16 December 1985) is a South African former football player who played as a midfielder. He played for Ajax Cape Town, AmaZulu and Moroka Swallows.
