= Salmaan King =

South African association footballer

Personal information
- Date of birth: 13 March 1985 (age 41)
- Place of birth: Cape Town, South Africa
- Height: 1.69 m (5 ft 7 in)
- Position: Left winger

Youth career
- Juventus Mitchell's Plain
- Ajax Cape Town

Senior career*
Years	Team	Apps	(Gls)
2003–2005	Ajax Cape Town		
2005–2008	Maritzburg United		
2008–2013	Engen Santos		
2013–2014	Free State Stars	5	(0)
2014–2015	Cape Town All Stars	11	(2)
- * Club domestic league appearances and goals

Salmaan King, previously Graham King (born 13 March 1985 in Cape Town), is a South African football (soccer) midfielder playing as a left-winger.

He hails from Mitchell's Plain on the Cape Flats.
