= Aidan Jenniker =

South African soccer player

Personal information
- Full name: Aidan Jenniker
- Date of birth: 3 June 1989 (age 37)
- Place of birth: Cape Town, South Africa
- Position: Left-back

Team information
- Current team: Cape Town All Stars
- Number: 24

Youth career
- Westridge FC
- Ajax Cape Town

Senior career*
Years	Team	Apps	(Gls)
2007–2016	Ajax Cape Town	93	(2)
2010–2011	→ Vasco da Gama CT (loan)	25	(1)
2017–	Cape Town All Stars	6	(0)
- * Club domestic league appearances and goals as of 29 November 2017

Aidan Jenniker (born 3 June 1989) is a South African football (soccer) left-back for Premier Soccer League club Cape Town All Stars.
