= Rolf de Boer =

Dutch footballer

Personal information
- Date of birth: 19 July 1977 (age 49)
- Place of birth: Bedum, Netherlands
- Position: Striker

Youth career
- CVVB
- Groningen
- Heerenveen

Senior career*
Years	Team	Apps	(Gls)
1999-2000	Cape Town Spurs	8	(0)
2000-2010	ACV		
- * Club domestic league appearances and goals

Rolf de Boer (born 19 July 1977) is a Dutch retired footballer.

== Career ==
De Boer played in the academies of Groningen and Heerenveen but never made it to the latter's senior team except for one Intertoto match. In 1999, de Boer, signed for South African top flight side Cape Town Spurs after trialing for KuPS in Finland, where he made 8 appearances and scored 0 goals and said, "In the Netherlands, everything is always arranged to perfection. In South Africa it is different and sometimes things go wrong. That was the case in this case. It turned out that there were no linesmen present and the corresponding flags were also missing. Then linesmen had to be sought in haste. Fortunately, we succeeded just in time, but the flags could no longer be arranged. That is why the pseudo-flags used the traditional Ajax shirts as a flag. Out of the corner of my eye I saw that my friends were 'not amused'. Afterwards they expressed their shame about the fact that the Ajax shirts were used as flags for the linesmen. Such a thing would indeed not happen with us. It's quintessentially South African." After that, he signed for ACV in the Dutch fifth division.

In summer 2012, de Boer succeeded Jan Schulting as manager of SV Urk. He had coached CVVB in the two years before. He announced his departure from Urk in 2016.

== Personal life ==
De Boer lives with his wife Xandra and their two daughters in Nieuw-Roden.
