= Brett Evans =

Brett Evans may refer to:

- Brett Evans (soccer, born 1982), South African soccer player
- Brett Evans (Australian footballer) (born 1972), Australian rules footballer
