= Jean-Yves Kerjean =

French footballer and coach (born 1958)

Personal information
- Date of birth: 25 June 1958 (age 68)
- Place of birth: Ploudalmézeau, France
- Position: Defender

Senior career*
Years	Team	Apps	(Gls)
1976–1982	Stade Rennais		
1982–1983	FC Chaumont		
1983–1985	Olympique de Marseille		
1985–1987	FC Istres		
1987–1989	Dijon FCO		
1989–1990	FC Perpignan		
1990–1992	Vannes OC		

Managerial career
- 1992–1996: Vannes OC
- 1996–1998: US Concarneau
- 1998–1999: Amicale de Lucé
- 1999–2000: FC Annecy
- 2000–2001: Limoges FC
- 2001–2002: Orlando Pirates
- 2003–2004: Olympique Tizi Rached
- 2005: Black Leopards
- 2007–2010: Stade Brestois B
- * Club domestic league appearances and goals

Jean-Yves Kerjean (born 25 June 1958) is a French retired football coach and footballer who is last known to have managed Stade Brestois B in his home country.

== South Africa ==
Given the Orlando Pirates head coach post in 2001 after several negotiations, Kerjean was obstinate about his system of promoting young talents near the end of the year and guided the Bucs to third-place in the league and a 3–0 triumph over Kaizer Chiefs in the Soweto Derby. However, he was discharged from his post in summer 2002 following poor results and the failure of his young talent system. After a stop in Dubai, Kerjean was announced as head coach of Black Leopards in 2005, aiming for a top eight finish before being dismissed a month later.

Reflecting on his stay in South Africa, the French mentor claimed that safety was an issue and that he had to be accompanied by bodyguards.

He applied to coach a few South African clubs in 2010.
