= Andre Petim =

South African soccer player

Personal information
- Full name: Andre De Abreu Petim
- Date of birth: 3 August 1985 (age 41)
- Place of birth: Cape Town, South Africa
- Height: 1.78 m (5 ft 10 in)
- Position: Goalkeeper

Team information
- Current team: Ajax Cape Town (South Africa)
- Number: 16

Youth career
- Vasco Da Gama
- Ajax Cape Town

Senior career*
| Years | Team | Apps | (Gls) |
| 2004–2015 | Ajax Cape Town | 102 | (0) |
| 2012 | → Golden Arrows (loan) | 3 | (0) |
| 2012–2013 | Vasco Da Gama(Loan) | 5 | (0) |
- * Club domestic league appearances and goals as of 17 May 2012 ‡ National team caps and goals as of 17 May 2012

Andre Petim (born 3 August 1985 in Cape Town, Western Cape) is a South African football (soccer) goalkeeper for Premier Soccer League club Vasco Da Gama. He was born to Portuguese settlers from Madeira.

== Career ==
He started off his career at Vasco Da Gama and started off his Ajax Cape Town career at the age of 15 years, at the age of 19 years he made his 1st team debut. He has represented the South African U23 team and has also played in the African Champions League with Ajax. He was also part of the successful Ajax team that won the ABSA Cup in 2007. Petim also played a big part in the winning of the 2008 Telkom Knockout for Ajax when he saved two penalties in the 1st round and had a fantastic game in the final and was also a nominee for goalkeeper of the tournament.

He is currently the Head Goalkeeper Coach at Ajax Cape Town.
