= Bibey Mutombo =

Congolese footballer and manager

Kalambay "Bibey" Mutombo (2 October 1961 – 8 August 2008) was a Congolese football manager. He was born in Kinshasa.

He died on 8 August 2008 in Belgium after a long illness.

== Clubs managed ==
- Orlando Pirates FC, South Africa (Head coach)
- Black Leopards FC, South Africa (Head coach)
- AS Vita Club, DR Congo (Head coach)
- DRC National Team (Assistant coach)
- R.E. Virton, Belgium (Assistant coach)
- FC Rodange 91, Luxembourg (Head coach)
- Sporting Mertzig, Luxembourg (Head coach)
