= George Mofokeng (soccer) =

South African soccer player

Personal information
- Full name: George Agisanyang Mofokeng
- Date of birth: 20 June 1979 (age 47)
- Place of birth: Ganyesa, South Africa
- Height: 1.89 m (6 ft 2 1/2 in)
- Position: Central defender

Youth career
- 2000–2001: Southy Young Tigers
- 2001–2002: Young Pirates
- 2002–2003: R.S.C. Anderlecht
- 2003–2004: Basotho Tigers

Senior career*
Years	Team	Apps	(Gls)
2004–2005	Louisvale Pirates		
2005–2006	Ajax Cape Town	36	(2)
2007	Supersport United	15	(2)
2007–2011	Platinum Stars	73	(4)

International career
2006	South Africa	3	(0)
- * Club domestic league appearances and goals

George Mofokeng (born 20 June 1979 in Ganyesa) is a South African former soccer player who played as a defender. He last played for Platinum Stars. He was capped thrice for South Africa.
