= Lizo Mjempu =

South African soccer player (born 1984)

Personal information
- Full name: Lizo Matthews Mjempu
- Date of birth: 1 January 1984 (age 42)
- Place of birth: Queenstown, South Africa
- Height: 1.75 m (5 ft 9 in)
- Position: Left back

Team information
- Current team: Passion FC (manager)

Youth career
- Remember FC
- Early Birds
- Jomo Cosmos

Senior career*
Years	Team	Apps	(Gls)
- Jomo Cosmos
- Mpumalanga Black Aces
- Lusitano
2010–2011	Ajax Cape Town	17	(0)
2011–2012	Orlando Pirates	3	(0)
2012–2015	Moroka Swallows		

Managerial career
- 2020–: Passion FC
- * Club domestic league appearances and goals

Lizo Mjempu (born 1 January 1984) is a South African professional soccer player who played as a defender for Moroka Swallows.

== Career ==
Lizo Mjempu began his professional career in the South African Premier Soccer League playing for Mpumalanga Black Aces, followed by Jomo Cosmos and Lusitano F.C. before signing with Ajax Cape Town as a free transfer in the summer of 2010. His last club was Moroka Swallows until 2015.

In 2020, he became manager of Passion FC.
