= Saxon Rovers F.C. =

Saxon Rovers
- Full name: Saxon Rovers Football Club
- Founded: 1944
- Ground: Cape Town
- Chairman: Allan Roman
- Website: http://www.saxonroversfc.co.za/

Saxon Rovers are a South African football club based in Cape Town. They currently play in the amateur leagues.

Season	Position	Division	Games played	Won	Drew	Lost	Goals for	Goals against	Points	Notes
2001/2002	5	National First Division (Coastal Stream)	26	10	11	5	41	−35	41	
2000/2001	3	National First Division (Coastal Stream)	26	12	3	11	45	−40	39	
1999/2000	6	National First Division (Coastal Stream)	26	11	3	12	46	−46	36	
1998/1999	4	National First Division (Coastal Stream)	26	12	7	7	37	−25	43	
1997/1998	4	National First Division (Coastal Stream)	38	19	8	11	82	−55	65	
1996/1997	7	National First Division (Western Cape Stream)	30	11	10	9	39	−39	43	
