= Bloemfontein Celtic F.C. =

Bloemfontein Celtic
- Full name: Bloemfontein Celtic Football Club
- Nicknames: Phunya Sele Sele, Siwelele
- Founded: 1969; 57 years ago, as Mangaung United
- League: SAFA Second Division
- 2024-25: Withdrew from Free State Group B
Home colours	Away colours

Bloemfontein Celtic Football Club (simply known as Celtic) is a South African soccer club based in Bloemfontein.

Bloemfontein Celtic has a large fan base in the Free State and competed in the Premiership before selling their status to Royal AM before the start of the 2021–22 South African Premiership season.

Its supporters were known as Siwelele.

== History ==
The club was founded by Norman Mathobisa and Victor Mahatane in 1969. They administered the club until the early 1980s when financial challenges forced them to sell the club to Petrus "Whitehead" Molemela. In November 2001, after the relegation of Phunya Sele Sele, Molemela sold his shares in the club to Demetri "Jimmy" Augousti, a former Celtic player.

After only three years out of the top-flight, the club regained its Premiership status with an impressive season in 2003–04 when they were crowned First Division champions. They also managed to win the 2005 SAA Supa 8 and the 2007 Telkom Charity Cup.

In 2009 they formed a partnership with Portuguese club Sporting CP, that included the creation of a youth academy, based in the capital of the Free State.

Max Tshabalala, who also owns Roses United, took over from Augousti on 21 July 2014.

After selling their Premiership status, they competed in the amateur Free State stream of the amateur SAFA Second Division before withdrawing in January 2025, intending to purchase their way back to the Premiership.

As of May 2025, they are looking to purchase a National First Division status.

In July 2025, a consortium affiliated with Sports Minister Gayton McKenzie bought SuperSport United, and renamed it Siwelele F.C. McKenzie has been vocal about restoring Bloemfontein Celtic to the Premiership. However, fans have not accepted the new club as Bloemfontein Celtic.

== Honours ==
- Mainstay Cup
  - Winners: 1985
- MTN8/SAA Sup 8 Cup
  - Winners (1): 2005
  - Runners-up: 2020
- Telkom Charity Cup
  - Winners: 2007
- First Division Inland Stream
  - Winners: 2003–04
- Telkom Knockout
  - Winner: 2012
- Charity Showdown
  - Winners: 2014
- Nedbank Cup
  - Runners-up: 2019–20

== Club records ==
- Most starts: (South Africa) Willem Vries 306
- Most goals: (South Africa) Benjamin Reed 75
- Most capped player: (Lesotho) Lehlohonolo Seema
- Most starts in a season: (South Africa) Jeffrey Lekgetla 39 (1992)
- Most goals in a season: (South Africa) Troy Saila 20 (1987)
- Record victory: 8–0 vs University of Stellenbosch (26/2/14, Nedbank Cup)
- Record defeat: 0–6 vs Kaizer Chiefs (29/3/91, NSL)

=== Premiership ===
- 1996–97 – 10th
- 1997–98 – 12th
- 1998–99 – 7th
- 1999–00 – 14th
- 2000–01 – 17th (relegated)

=== National First Division ===
- 2001–02 Inland Stream – 4th
- 2002–03 Inland Stream – 2nd
- 2003–04 Inland Stream – 1st (promoted)

=== Premiership ===
- 2004–05 – 8th
- 2005–06 – 10th
- 2006–07 – 8th
- 2007–08 – 11th
- 2008–09 – 14th
- 2009–10 – 6th
- 2010–11 – 5th
- 2011–12 – 8th
- 2012–13 – 5th
- 2013–14 – 6th
- 2014–15 – 7th
- 2015–16 – 11th
- 2016–17 – 12th
- 2017–18 – 11th
- 2018–19 – 8th
- 2019-20 – 8th
- 2020–21 – 11th (Premiership franchise sold)

=== SAFA Second Division ===
- 2021–22 Stream B – 1st
- 2023–24 Stream A – 2nd
- 2024–25 Stream 1B – withdrew

== Former players ==
- (South Africa) Vasili Sofiadellis

== Chairmen ==
- (Union of South Africa) Norman Mathobisa and Victor Mahatanya (1969–1984)
- (Union of South Africa) Petros Molemela (1984 – November 2001)
- (South Africa) Jimmy Augousti (November 2001 – 21 July 2014)
- (South Africa) Max Tshabalala (21 July 2014 – 26 October 2024)
- (South Africa) Tshilo Mahatanya (16 October 2025 - Present)

== Coaches ==
- (France) Paul Dolezar (2005–06)
- (South Africa) Tony De Nobrega (2006–07)
- (South Africa) Khabo Zondo (1 July 2007 – 9 April 2008)
- (South Africa) David Modise (interim) (April 2008 – 8 June)
- (South Africa) Mich d'Avray (1 July 2008 – 27 December 2008)
- (South Africa) Owen Da Gama (28 Dec 2008 – 30 June 2010)
- (South Africa) Clinton Larsen (9 Aug 2010 – 7 October 2013)
- (Germany) Ernst Middendorp (11 Oct 2013 – 15 December 2014)
- (South Africa) Clinton Larsen (15 Dec 2014–2015)
- Serame Letsoaka ( 3 Dec 2015–30 Oct 2016)
- (Malawi) John Maduka & (Lesotho) Lehlohonolo Seema(interim)(30 Oct 2016–3 Jul 2017)
- Veselin Jelusic (3 July 2017 – 14 June 2018)
- Steve Khompela ( 20 June 2018–27 Dec 2018)
- (Lesotho) Lehlohonolo Seema (28 Dec 2018– 5 Jul 2020)
- John Maduka (6 July 2020–?)
