= Durban Stars F.C. =

Durban Stars FC
- Full name: Durban Stars Football Club
- Nickname(s): Isivunguvungu Segagasi (stormy waves), Friends
- Founded: July 2003
- Ground: SJ Smith Stadium, Chatsworth, Durban, KwaZulu-Natal, South Africa
- Capacity: N/A
- Owner: Phindani Nene
- Coach: Ramadhan Nsanzurwimo
- League: Vodacom League, KwaZulu-Natal province
- 2010–11 season: 1
| Home colours | Away colours |

Durban Stars is a semi-professional association football club based in the Chatsworth suburb of Durban, in the KwaZulu-Natal province of South Africa. The club was founded in July 2003, when the businessman Phindani Nene acquired the Castle League franchise of the National First Division club Moja United from Pietermaritzburg, and thereby established his new club Durban Stars FC, directly into the second level of South African football. The club played at that level from 2003–09, before being relegated to Vodacom League.

At the subsequent 2009–10 season, the club got relegated to the fourth level, known as the SAB Regional League, after having received no less than 14 "disciplinary 0–2 defeats" from SAFA. Presumably, the disciplinary irregularity arose from the fact that the team had fielded ineligible players during almost half of the matches in the season. To avoid the relegation for the fourth level, the club decided to buy the Castle League franchise of Globe City in Vodacom League. In the 2010–11 season, the newly reinforced Durban Stars won the KwaZulu-Natal division of Vodacom League. In June 2011, they participated in the Vodacom League playoffs, competing for a promotion back to the National First Division.

== Durban Stars company and affiliations ==
The company Durban Stars is based in the La-Lucia suburb of Durban, and handles events and marketing across South Africa. Durban Stars Sports and Marketing is a subdivision of Durban Stars, that specialises in Sports Development, Sports Events, Branding, Digital Advertising and Sports Sponsorship and Sales. Among the customers of the services provided by Durban Stars are: MTN Group, Nedbank, SuperSport, SABC, Ethekwini Municipality and KwaZulu-Natal provincial government. As of 2008, the annual events organised by Durban Stars include: Varsity Cup, Mini Soccer World Cup, MTN Top 32 Schools Soccer Tournament, and Durban Summer Splash.

The company also opted to establish the Durban Stars Sporting Club as a subdivision, to develop sporting clubs within several sports disciplines. As of 2008, they have created professional teams within Beach soccer, BMX, Skateboarding, Touch rugby, Beach cricket, Basketball, Volleyball and Indigenous Games.

== Club records and best achievements ==
- Won the silver medal of the National First Division in 2004–05.
- Reached the 1/8-Finals (round 16) of the 2004 ABSA cup.
- Highest scored point average, 2.33 points per match, was achieved when the club won the KwaZulu-Natal province of Vodacom League in 2010–11.
- Nqobizizwe Que Kunene remains the clubs all time goal scorer with 78 goals scored.

=== Historical League results ===
- 2003–04 (NFD) – 3rd (in Coastal stream)
- 2004–05 (NFD) – 2nd
- 2005–06 (NFD) – 10th
- 2006–07 (NFD) – 7th
- 2007–08 (NFD) – 6th (in Coastal stream)
- 2008–09 (NFD) – 8th (in Coastal stream => Relegated)
- 2009–10 (VL) – 16th (in Kwazulu-Natal)
- 2010–11 (VL) – 1st (in Kwazulu-Natal)

== Team squad in 2010–11 ==
The list below highlight the team's most valuable players as of May 2011, according to the South African soccer site KickOff.

Note: Flags indicate national team as defined under FIFA eligibility rules; some limited exceptions apply. Players may hold more than one non-FIFA nationality.

| No. | Pos. | Nation | Player |
|---|---|---|---|
| — | MF | (South Africa) RSA | Nkosinathi Dlamuka (c) |

Head Coach: Ramadhan Nsanzurwimo
1st Assistant: Alex Zondi

== Stadium ==
According to available match statistics from 2007–09, the preferred home venue for the team while playing in the National First Division, was Chatsworth Stadium with a capacity of 22,000. After the relegation to Vodacom League in June 2009, the team moved their home venue for the next season to Kings Park Stadium with a capacity of 55,000. In the 2010–11 season, the team could however only afford to play at much smaller venues in Durban. The preferred home venue in this season, was the SJ Smith Stadium, being situated in the Lamontville district, at the Chatsworth suburb in Durban.
