= Seven Stars F.C. =

Seven Stars
- Full name: Seven Stars Football Club
- Founded: 1995
- Dissolved: 1999 (merged with Cape Town Spurs to form Ajax Cape Town)
- Ground: Cape Town

Seven Stars was an association football club from Cape Town, Western Cape, South Africa.

== History ==
Seven Stars was formed in 1995 by Rob Moore. They are also known for the commitment to develop talent in under developed the Langa, Khayelitsha and Nyanga and used the under-developed Nyanga Stadium as a home venue. In the 1997–98 National First Division season, Seven Stars were unbeaten in the 38 games under Gavin Hunt, finished as champions of the coastal stream. The team scored 94 goals and conceded 16 in their allotted 38 games, amassing 98 points to gain promotion to the Premier Division.

In the 1998/99 season, Seven Stars finished 5th in the Castle Premiership. Stars merged with Cape Town Spurs and became Ajax Cape Town in 1999. However, none of the club's identity, ethos, or commitment to township football was retained after the Ajax merger. It is widely regarded that the ethos of Seven Stars and a winning mentality in Cape Town football were restored by the launch of Cape Town City in 2016.

== Notable former managers ==
- (South Africa) Gavin Hunt (1995–1998)
