= National First Division =

- Organising body: Premier Soccer League
- Founded: 1996
- Country: South Africa
- Confederation: CAF
- Divisions: 1
- Number of clubs: 16
- Level on pyramid: 2
- Promotion to: Premiership
- Relegation to: SAFA Second Division
- Domestic cup: Nedbank Cup
- Current champions: Kruger United (1st title) (2025–26)
- Most championships: Free State Stars; Jomo Cosmos; Chippa United; Polokwane City (2 titles)
- Website: psl.co.za/national-first-division
- Current: 2026–27 National First Division

The National First Division, officially known as the Motsepe Foundation Championship for sponsorship reasons, is the second-highest league of South African football after the South African Premiership. Both the Championship and Premiership are organised by the Premier Soccer League.

== Structure and rules ==
=== Seasons 2007–2011 ===
The restructured NFD was divided into two streams, one inland and another coastal – each of which consisted of 8 teams. The winners of the two streams played against each other in a 'final' at the end of the season – the winner of which was promoted to the Premiership. The loser of the 'final' played in a mini-tournament/play-offs against the two second-placed teams in each stream and the 15th-placed team on the Premiership log. The winner of this tournament was automatically promoted to the top flight.

Inland provinces

- Gauteng
- Limpopo
- Free State
- Mpumalanga
- North West

Coastal provinces

- Eastern Cape
- KwaZulu-Natal
- Northern Cape
- Western Cape

Map of League streams: Inland Stream / Coastal Stream

=== Season 2011 onwards ===
A new structure and new rules were decided, beginning from the 2011-12 season. The new rules are, that competing NFD teams, at all times during NFD matches, are required to field:

- Minimum 5 South African-born under 23 players.
- Maximum 3 foreign players.

The new structure of the league, is a re-introduction of the one division format, previously used for the three seasons in 2004-07. This means, that the two former geographical split streams, will merge into one common division. The winner of the NFD will gain automatic promotion to Premiership (replacing the lowest ranked team in Premiership). Teams to finish 2nd and 3rd in NFD, will enter a playoff stage with a round robin format, against the team ranked as nr.15 in Premiership. Only the winner of this playoff stage gets promoted to the Premiership.

Relegation/promotion rules between the NFD and the SAFA Second Division remain more or less unchanged. After each season, the two lowest ranked teams in the NFD will be relegated to the SAFA Second Division. In the opposite direction, the two best teams of SAFA Second Division will get promoted to the NFD, decided by a round robin playoff stage between the 9 provincial winners.

== History ==

The first non-racial second level of South African football, was established in March 1987 as the OK League. This league served as the competing place, for promotion/relegation to and from the topflight NSL. In the former years from 1978–1986, a topflight non-racial First Level had already been established, after the merger of the NFL and NPSL, to form the new common topflight NPSL. In the early years from 1978–1986 relegation/promotion to and from the topflight league, according to official records actually did happen, but apparently it happened from a Second Level league structure, still divided into whites/blacks/coloureds.

When the new topflight South African Premiership was established in 1996, the organizers at the same time for the Second Level, replaced the former OK League with the new National First Division. Apart from being covered by a better sponsor deal, the most significant change -both at the First and Second Level- was to change the fixtures from yearly seasons, into the more Internationally adapted: September–May football season.

The first sponsors were United Bank who sponsored the league in 1997 and 1998. From November 1998 until the end of the 2001/2001 season, the league was sponsored by MTN. It was reported that MTN withdrew from sponsorship the First Division as they were unhappy with their treatment from the PSL - the division organisers. MTN had been rebuffed by the PSL in their efforts to sponsor the PSL-organised Charity Cup because Orlando Pirates and Kaizer Chiefs would refuse to play in the tournament as the two clubs were sponsored by MTN's telecommunication rivals, Vodacom. The First Division could not find a new sponsor until May 2004.

From 2004 until 2007 the league was sponsored by business magnate Tokyo Sexwale's Mvelaphanda Group and known as Mvela Golden League. For those three seasons, there was no geographical split and all 16 teams played in one division. The league was then initially unable to find a sponsor, and there was again a geographical split into two or four streams until the 2011–12 season.

Streams
Year	Western Cape	Natal/Eastern/Cape	Northern	Southern
	Winner	Winner	Winner	Winner
1996–97	Santos	African Wanderers	Black Leopards	Tembisa Classic
Streams
Year	Coastal		Inland	
	Winner	Runner-up	Winner	Runner-up
1997–98	Seven Stars	Michau Warriors	Dynamos	Witbank Aces
1998–99	African Wanderers	Avendale Athletico	Tembisa Classic	Ria Stars
1999–2000	Golden Arrows	Avendale Athletico	Ria Stars	Dynamos
2000–01	Amazulu	Park United	Black Leopards	Bloemfontein Young Tigers
2001–02	African Wanderers	Avendale Athletico	Dynamos	Silver Stars
2002–03	AmaZulu	Premier United	Silver Stars	Bloem Celtic
2003–04	Bush Bucks	Avendale Athletico	Bloemfontein Celtic	Free State Stars
National
	Winner	Runner-up	Third place	Fourth place
2004–05	Free State Stars	Durban Stars	Hellenic	Tembisa Classic
2005–06	Wits University	City Pillars	Vasco Da Gama	Benoni Premier United
2006–07	Free State Stars	Winners Park	Pretoria University	FC AK
Streams
Year	Coastal		Inland	
	Winner	Runner-up	Winner	Runner-up
2007–08	Maritzburg United	Bay United	FC AK	Dynamos
2008–09	Carara Kicks	FC Cape Town	Jomo Cosmos	Mpumalanga Black Aces
2009–10	Vasco Da Gama	Nathi Lions	Black Leopards (Note: Black Leopards participated in a two-legged promotion/relegation playoff with Mpumalanga Black Aces and lost 5-3 on penalties. They were not promoted.)	African Warriors
2010–11	Bay United	Thanda Royal Zulu	Jomo Cosmos	Black Leopards
National
	Winner	Runner-up	Third place	Fourth place
2011–12	Pretoria University	Chippa United	Thanda Royal Zulu	Blackburn Rovers
2012–13	Polokwane City	Santos	Mpumalanga Black Aces	Thanda Royal Zulu
2013–14	Chippa United	Black Leopards	Maritzburg United	Baroka
2014–15	Lamontville Golden Arrows	Jomo Cosmos	Black Leopards	Thanda Zulu Royal
2015–16	Baroka	Highlands Park	Mbombela United	Witbank Spurs
2016–17	Thanda Royal Zulu F.C. (Note: Thanda Zulu Royal were not promoted as their league status was purchased by fifth-placed Amazulu.)	Black Leopards	Stellenbosch	Royal Eagles
2017–18	Highlands Park	Black Leopards	Jomo Cosmos	Real Kings
2018–19	Stellenbosch	Royal Eagles	Tshakhuma Tsha Madzivhandila	Ajax Cape Town
2019–20	Moroka Swallows	Ajax Cape Town	Tshakhuma Tsha Madzivhandila (Note: TTM lost in the playoffs, but purchased their position in the 2020–21 South African Premier Division by buying the Premier League status of Bidvest Wits.)	Real Kings
2020–21	Sekhukhune United	Royal AM (Note: Royal AM did not participate in the playoffs, but purchased their position in the 2021–22 South African Premier Division by buying the Premier League status of Bloemfontein Celtic.)	Richards Bay	TS Sporting
2021–22	Richards Bay	Tuks	Cape Town All Stars	JDR Stars
2022–23	Polokwane City	Cape Town Spurs	Casric Stars	All Stars
2023–24	Magesi	University of Pretoria	Baroka	Maritzburg United
2024–25	Durban City	Orbit College	Casric Stars	Black Leopards
2025–26	Kruger United	Cape Town CIty	Milford	Casric Stars

Promoted to Premiership

Playoff losers

== See also ==
- Nedbank Cup
