= Avendale Athletico =

- Ground: Field Crescent, Cape Town

Avendale Athletico is a South African football club from Cape Town.

== History ==
Owner Keith Bougaard spent millions on a push for promotion to the top tier, but the club failed each time, finishing runners up in the National First Division four times.

They came close to promotion from the 2001–02 National First Division but lost a controversial game to African Wanderers amidst accusations of bribery and corruption, eventually finishing second behind Wanderers. They also claimed to have been approached for a bribe during the season.

They were relegated from the National First Division in 2004/2005.

== Achievements ==
- National First Division – Coastal Stream
  - Runners-up (4): 1998/99, 1999/00, 2001/02, 2003/04
