= Western Province United F.C. =

Western Province United
- Full name: Western Province United Football Club
- Founded: 1998, as FC Fortune
| Home colours | Away colours |

Western Province United is a South African football club. Formed via the purchase of Umtata Bucks by Delphisure Insurance Brokers owner Mr Vango Kolovos. In September 2006, they finally settled with the current name of the club: Western Province United FC.

In late 2007, businessman Dumisani Ndlovu, who previously owned Benoni Premier United, purchased WP United for R6.2 million. The club was relegated in May 2008 to play in Vodacom League, and was further relegated in May 2011 to SAFA Regional League, being the fourth and lowest level of South African football. The Western Province United FC is currently owned by Western Cape Sport School.
