= 2010–11 SAFA Second Division =

Vodacom League
- Season: 2010–11
- Champions: Chippa United
- Promoted: Chippa United and Sivutsa Stars

The 2010–11 SAFA Second Division season, also known as Vodacom League due to a sponsoring deal, took place in South Africa between the months of September and May. The league is the third tier of South African football, and is divided geographically into 5 divisions in the Coastal Stream and 4 divisions in the Inland Stream.

== Coastal Stream ==
=== Eastern Cape Province ===
Map indicating the extent of Eastern Cape within the Republic of South Africa

Pos	Team	Pld	W	D	L	GF	GA	GD	Pts
1	Buffalo	30	21	5	4	60	18	+42	68
2	Tornado	30	18	8	4	63	28	+35	62
3	Mthata Liverpool	30	17	6	7	61	30	+31	57
4	Manchester United	30	17	5	8	50	38	+12	56
5	Happy Brothers	30	15	7	8	42	32	+10	52
6	Bay Academy	30	13	11	6	39	24	+15	50
7	Matta Milan	30	14	7	9	36	37	−1	49
8	Tembu Royals	30	12	9	9	34	29	+5	45
9	Kokstad Liverpool	30	10	6	14	32	52	−20	36
10	Cloud 9 (aka African Winners)	30	10	5	15	41	41	0	35
11	O.R. Tambo D.C.	30	8	9	13	42	56	−14	33
12	Matat Professionals	30	7	9	14	31	44	−13	30
13	Bush Bucks	30	9	3	18	38	55	−17	30
14	Mighty Greens	30	7	8	15	36	44	−8	29
15	Young Stars	30	6	8	16	31	49	−18	26
16	Royals	30	1	4	25	25	84	−59	7

Leaving for 2011-12: Young Stars (relegated), Royals (relegated).
Joining for 2011-12: Two promoted teams from SAB Regional League.

Team name	Stadium	City
Buffalo	Jan Smuts Stadium	East London
Bay Academy	NU 2 Stadium	Port Elizabeth
Bush Bucks	Jan Smuts Stadium	East London
Cloud 9 (Aka African Winners)	Bredbach Sport Field	Breidbach
Happy Brothers	Rotary Stadium	Mthatha
Kokstad Liverpool	Bongweni Sports Field	Bongweni
Manchester United	Ward 4 Sports Fields	Mthonjaneni
Matat Professionals	Matatiele Stadium	Matatiele
Matta Milan	Dutywa Stadium	Dutywa
Mighty Greens	Kwezi Naledi Stadium	Lady Grey
Mthata Liverpool	Rotary Stadium	Mthatha
O.R. Tambo D.C.	Jan Smuts Stadium	East London
Royals	Dutywa Stadium	Dutywa
Tembu Royals	Rotary Stadium	Mthatha
Tornado	Jan Smuts Stadium	East London
Young Stars	Sauer Park	Aliwal North

=== Free State Province ===
Map indicating the extent of Free State within the Republic of South Africa

Pos	Team	Pld	W	D	L	GF	GA	GD	Pts
1	Roses United	30	25	4	1	91	19	+72	79
2	Botshabelo	30	25	2	3	82	26	+56	77
3	Maluti Fet College	30	21	6	3	61	20	+41	69
4	Super Eagles	30	18	2	10	52	27	+25	56
5	Bloemfontein Young Tigers	29	17	3	9	59	36	+23	54
6	Moving Spurs	30	13	6	11	59	45	+14	45
7	Harmony	30	12	7	11	38	39	−1	43
8	Liverpool BTX	30	10	9	11	36	41	−5	39
9	Bubchu United	29	10	7	12	54	67	−13	37
10	Celtic Colts	30	9	6	15	46	46	0	33
11	Tower United	29	9	5	15	30	52	−22	32
12	Sasolburg Juventus	30	7	5	18	35	62	−27	26
13	United All Tigers	30	7	4	19	25	57	−32	25
14	Free State Champs	30	6	6	18	30	50	−20	24
15	Mangaung City	30	7	3	20	31	85	−54	24
16	Harrismith United	29	4	1	24	19	76	−57	13

Leaving for 2011-12: Mangaung City (relegated), Harrismith United (relegated).
Joining for 2011-12: Two promoted teams from SAB Regional League.

Team name	Stadium	City
Bloemfontein Young Tigers	Tempe Military Base	Bloemfontein
Botshabelo	Botshabelo Stadium	Botshabelo
Bubchu United	Clive Solomons Stadium	Bloemfontein
Celtic Colts	Westdene Stadium	Bloemfontein
Free State Champs	Zamdela Stadium	Sasolburg
Harmony	Zuka Baloyi Stadium	Welkom
Harrismith United	Tshiame Stadium	Harrismith
Liverpool BTX	Zuka Baloyi Stadium	Welkom
Maluti Fet College	Platberg Stadium	Harrismith
Mangaung City	Selosesha Stadium	Thaba Nchu
Moving Spurs	Phuthaditjhaba Stadium	Phuthaditjhaba
Roses United	Westdene Stadium	Bloemfontein
Sasolburg Juventus	Flavius Mareka Sports Ground	Sasolburg
Super Eagles	Bohlokong Stadium	Bohlokong
Tower United	Botshabelo Stadium	Botshabelo
United All Tigers	Excelsior Stadium	Excelsior

=== KwaZulu-Natal Province ===
Map indicating the extent of KwaZulu-Natal within the Republic of South Africa

Pos	Team	Pld	W	D	L	GF	GA	GD	Pts
1	Durban Stars	30	21	7	2	57	20	+37	70
2	Sobantu Shooting Stars	30	16	7	7	45	34	+11	55
3	Real Classic	30	16	5	9	53	28	+25	53
4	Island	30	16	3	11	60	46	+14	51
5	Amajuba United Killers	30	15	4	11	45	40	+5	49
6	Dundee XI Experience	30	13	6	11	52	48	+4	45
7	Durban Warriors	30	11	7	12	41	42	−1	40
8	SAPS Callies	30	10	10	10	45	47	−2	40
9	KwaMashu All Stars	30	10	8	12	32	34	−2	38
10	Wembezi Juventus	29	10	5	14	25	39	−14	35
11	Newcastle Sicilians	30	9	7	14	39	49	−10	34
12	Gqikazi All Stars	30	10	4	16	43	60	−17	34
13	African Wanderers	29	9	6	14	33	41	−8	33
14	Maritzburg City	30	10	3	17	36	50	−14	33
15	Abaqulusi	30	9	6	15	36	54	−18	33
16	Bright Stars	30	9	2	19	36	46	−10	29

Leaving for 2011-12: Abaqulusi (relegated), Bright Stars (relegated).
Joining for 2011-12: Two promoted teams from SAB Regional League.

Team name	Stadium	City
Abaqulusi	Kandahar Sports Fields	Ladysmith
African Wanderers	SJ Smith Stadium	Durban (Chatsworth)
Amajuba United Killers	Osizweni Stadium	Osizweni
Bright Stars	Richards Bay Stadium	Richards Bay
Dundee XI Experience	Mpumelelo Stadium	Dundee
Durban Stars	SJ Smith Stadium	Durban (Chatsworth)
Durban Warriors	Princess Magogo Stadium	Durban (KwaMashu)
Gqikazi All Stars	Ulundi Stadium	Ulundi
Island	Ulundi Stadium	Ulundi
Kwa-Mashu All Stars	Makhehleni Ground 1	Durban (KwaMashu)
Maritzburg City	Wadley Stadium	Pietermaritzburg
Newcastle Sicilians	Arbor Park	Newcastle
Real Classic	Richards Bay Stadium	Richards Bay
SAPS Callies	Ugu Sports and Leisure Centre	Port Shepstone
Sobantu Shooting Stars	Sobantu Stadium	Pietermaritzburg
Wembezi Juventus	AG Magubane Stadium	Ladysmith

=== Northern Cape Province ===
Map indicating the extent of Northern Cape within the Republic of South Africa

Pos	Team	Pld	W	D	L	GF	GA	GD	Pts
1	Real Madrid	30	23	6	1	92	14	+78	75
2	Steach United	30	23	5	2	106	21	+85	74
3	Olympics	30	16	5	9	44	34	+10	53
4	William Prescod	30	15	6	9	50	32	+18	51
5	Kakamas Juventus	29	13	8	8	48	39	+9	47
6	Young Pirates	30	12	10	8	35	28	+7	46
7	Charlton	30	13	7	10	55	54	+1	46
8	Wanderers	30	14	2	14	44	46	−2	44
9	Kakamas Sundowns	30	13	3	14	35	57	−22	42
10	Wings United	30	11	5	14	41	44	−3	38
11	Morester Jeug	30	10	5	15	49	58	−9	35
12	North East Celtics	30	9	4	17	38	47	−9	31
13	Louisvale Pirates	30	9	4	17	33	58	−25	31
14	Ray Madrid	30	9	2	19	45	91	−46	29
15	Kakamas Cosmos	29	8	3	18	34	65	−31	27
16	Amalawus	30	2	3	25	23	84	−61	9

Leaving for 2011-12: Kakamas Cosmos (relegated), Amalawus (relegated).
Joining for 2011-12: Two promoted teams from SAB Regional League.

Team name	Stadium	City
Amalawus	Pabellelo Stadium	Upington
Charlton	Douglas Stadium	Douglas
Kakamas Cosmos	Langverwagt Stadium	Kakamas
Kakamas Juventus	Langverwagt Stadium	Kakamas
Kakamas Sundowns	Langverwagt Stadium	Kakamas
Louisvale Pirates	Louisvale Stadium	Upington
Morester Jeug	Union Ground Stadium	Upington
North East Celtics	Pabellelo Stadium	Upington
Olympics	Okiep Stadium	Okiep
Ray Madrid	Okiep Stadium	Okiep
Real Madrid	Galeshewe Stadium	Kimberley
Steach United	Galeshewe Stadium	Kimberley
Wanderers	Bakgat Stadium	Kimberley
William Prescod	Bakgat Stadium	Kimberley
Wings United	Pabellelo Stadium	Upington
Young Pirates	Greenpoint Stadium	Kimberley

=== Western Cape Province ===
Map indicating the extent of Western Cape within the Republic of South Africa

Pos	Team	Pld	W	D	L	GF	GA	GD	Pts
1	Chippa United	32	26	5	1	96	18	+78	83
2	Milano United	32	25	5	2	102	24	+78	80
3	Mitchells Plain United	32	17	11	4	65	30	+35	62
4	Steenberg United	32	16	7	9	64	42	+22	55
5	Tygerberg	32	16	6	10	53	38	+15	54
6	Cape Town All Stars	32	15	5	12	48	40	+8	50
7	Beaufortwest City	32	12	9	11	37	42	−5	45
8	Ajax Cape Town U19	32	12	8	12	59	50	+9	44
9	Jomo Powers	32	11	9	12	48	58	−10	42
10	Old Mutual Academy	32	9	11	12	44	55	−11	38
11	Mbekweni United	32	10	6	16	31	65	−34	36
12	Baltic Rangers	32	9	7	16	44	50	−6	34
13	Royal Blues	32	9	7	16	34	61	−27	34
14	Ikapa Sporting	32	8	7	17	40	64	−24	31
15	Knysna Bafana	32	7	8	17	39	71	−32	29
16	Battswood	32	7	5	20	31	55	−24	26
17	Western Province United	32	4	2	26	26	98	−72	14

Leaving for 2011-12: Chippa United (promoted), Battswood (relegated), WP United (relegated).
Joining for 2011-12: Hanover Park (relegated), Two promoted teams from SAB Regional League.

Team name	Stadium	City
Ajax Cape Town U19	Ikamva Stadium	Cape Town (Parow)
Baltic Rangers	Youngsfield Military Base	Cape Town (Ottery)
Battswood	William Herbert	Cape Town (Wynberg)
Beaufortwest City	Rustdene Stadium	Beaufort West
Cape Town All Stars	Inyanga Stadium	Cape Town (Crossroads)
Chippa United	Philippi Stadium	Cape Town (Philippi)
Ikapa Sporting	(unknown stadium in 2010–11)	Cape Town (Belhar)
Jomo Powers	Robinvale Sport Field	Atlantis
Knysna Bafana	Knysna Stadium	Knysna
Mbekweni United	Mbekweni Stadium	Wellington
Milano United	Rooikrans Sports Complex	Cape Town (Grassy Park)
Mitchells Plain United	Lansdowne Academy	Cape Town (Lansdowne)
Old Mutual Academy	Mutual Park	Cape Town (Pinelands)
Royal Blues	Rustdene Stadium	Beaufort West
Steenberg United	Rooikrans Sports Complex	Cape Town (Grassy Park)
Tygerberg	Symphony Park	Cape Town (Belhar)
Western Province United	Western Cape Sports School	Cape Town (Kuils River)

== Inland Stream ==
=== Gauteng Province ===
Map indicating the extent of Gauteng within the Republic of South Africa

Pos	Team	Pld	W	D	L	GF	GA	GD	Pts
1	Highlands Park	30	20	7	3	65	30	+35	67
2	Blackpool	30	18	7	5	46	26	+20	61
3	Alexandra United	30	17	4	9	53	34	+19	55
4	Soweto Panthers	30	14	7	9	47	35	+12	49
5	The Vardos	30	14	5	11	42	45	−3	47
6	Berea – Albion	30	12	8	10	51	45	+6	44
7	Arcadia Shepherds	30	10	11	9	44	48	−4	41
8	SuperSport T.H. Academy	30	11	7	12	39	43	−4	40
9	M Tigers	30	9	12	9	39	38	+1	39
10	Bid Boys	30	9	10	11	59	54	+5	37
11	Yebo Yes United	30	8	11	11	43	45	−2	35
12	African All Stars	30	8	10	12	40	45	−5	34
13	Trabzon	30	8	9	13	25	35	−10	33
14	Benoni Premier United	30	8	7	15	35	48	−13	31
15	Real Barcelona	30	4	9	17	34	53	−19	21
16	Lesedi Shooting Stars	30	4	8	18	19	57	−38	20

Leaving for 2011-12: Real Barcelona (relegated), Lesedi Shooting Stars (relegated).
Joining for 2011-12: Two promoted teams from SAB Regional League.

Team name	Stadium	City
African All Stars	KwaThema Stadium	KwaThema
Alexandra United	Alexandra Stadium	Alexandra
Arcadia Shepherds	Caledonian Stadium	Pretoria
Benoni Premier United	Sinaba Stadium	Benoni
Berea - Albion	Martimo Sports Ground	Pretoria
Bid Boys	Bidvest Stadium	Johannesburg
Blackpool	Cecil Payne Stadium	Johannesburg
Highlands Park	Modderfontein Stadium	Johannesburg
Lesedi Shooting Stars	Zone 15 Hostel, Sebokeng	Sebokeng
M Tigers	Mehlareng Stadium	Tembisa
Real Barcelona	George Thabe Stadium	Sharpeville
Soweto Panthers	Highveld College, 17 Shaft	Soweto
SuperSport T.H. Academy	Pilditch Stadium	Pretoria
The Vardos	Makhulong Stadium	Tembisa
Trabzon	Mohlakeng Stadium	Randfontein
Yebo Yes United	Arthur Block Park	Johannesburg

=== Limpopo Province ===
Map indicating the extent of Limpopo within the Republic of South Africa

Pos	Team	Pld	W	D	L	GF	GA	GD	Pts
1	Baroka	30	25	3	2	68	17	+51	78
2	Winners Park	30	19	6	5	59	30	+29	63
3	Modimolle Aces	30	19	3	8	59	36	+23	60
4	Vhembe	30	17	5	8	62	33	+29	56
5	Blue Rocks	30	14	4	12	54	42	+12	46
6	Maniini All Blacks	30	13	5	12	44	44	0	44
7	Fanang Diatla	30	11	6	13	46	50	−4	39
8	Lephalale Young Killers	30	11	6	13	43	48	−5	39
9	Mighty	30	11	6	13	34	45	−11	39
10	The Dolphins	30	11	4	15	35	52	−17	37
11	Nobela All Stars	30	8	12	10	41	47	−6	36
12	Peace Lovers	30	11	3	16	37	46	−9	36
13	Naughty Boys	30	10	4	16	33	50	−17	34
14	Phungo All Stars	30	9	6	15	30	42	−12	33
15	Karee Young Stars	30	7	8	15	42	43	−1	29
16	Phalaborwa Real Rovers	30	3	1	26	25	87	−62	10

Leaving for 2011-12: Karee Young Stars (relegated), Phalaborwa Real Rovers (relegated).
Joining for 2011-12: Super Eagles (promoted), Davhana Shooting Stars (promoted).

Team name	Stadium	City
Baroka	Ngwana Mohube Sports Ground	Ga-Mphahlele
Blue Rocks	Nkowa-Nkowa Stadium	Tzaneen
Fanang Diatla	Lebowakgomo Stadium	Lebowakgomo
Karee Young Stars	Seshego Stadium	Seshego
Lephalale Young Killers	Mogoi Club Stadium	Lephalale
Maniini All Blacks	Makwarela Stadium	Makwarela
Mighty	Peter Mokaba Stadium	Polokwane
Modimolle Aces	Ephraim Mohale Stadium	Modimolle
Naughty Boys	Seshego Stadium	Seshego
Nobela All Stars	Bungeni Stadium	Bungeni
Peace Lovers	Peter Mokaba Stadium	Polokwane
Phalaborwa Real Rovers	Namakgale Stadium	Phalaborwa (Namakgale)
Phungo All Stars	Malamulele Stadium	Malamulele
The Dolphins	Seshego Stadium	Seshego
Vhembe	Makwarela Stadium	Makwarela
Winners Park	Mookgopong Grounds	Mookgopong

=== Mpumalanga Province ===
Map indicating the extent of Mpumalanga within the Republic of South Africa

Pos	Team	Pld	W	D	L	GF	GA	GD	Pts
1	Sivutsa Stars	30	22	3	5	74	27	+47	69
2	Mighty Mega Force	30	20	6	4	55	21	+34	66
3	Phiva Young Stars	30	12	8	10	59	52	+7	44
4	Mbombela United	30	12	7	11	57	51	+6	43
5	Benfica	30	11	9	10	44	53	−9	42
6	Sekhukhune Lions	30	11	8	11	42	37	+5	41
7	Middleburg Mighty Saints	30	12	5	13	42	46	−4	41
8	Lynville All Stars	30	12	5	13	40	46	−6	41
9	Thabo All Stars	30	10	10	10	42	43	−1	40
10	Amazayoni	30	9	11	10	34	34	0	38
11	Henemat	30	10	6	14	43	55	−12	36
12	Calaska	30	8	10	12	45	52	−7	34
13	Barberton City Stars	30	9	6	15	41	51	−10	33
14	MP Highlanders	30	9	6	15	41	67	−26	33
15	Mologadi	30	7	10	13	30	39	−9	31
16	Secunda Stars	30	7	8	15	31	46	−15	29

Leaving for 2011-12: Sivutsa Stars (promoted), Mologadi (relegated), Secunda Stars (relegated).
Joining for 2011-12: Batau (relegated), Two promoted teams from SAB Regional League.

Team name	Stadium	City
Amazayoni	Kriel Mine Stadium	Kriel
Barberton City Stars	Barberton Prison Farm	Barberton
Benfica	Thulamahashe Old Stadium	Bushbuckridge (Thulamahashe)
Calaska	Ackerville Stadium	Witbank (Ackerville)
Henemat	Mpumalanga Stadium	Ermelo
Lynville All Stars	Lynnville Stadium	Witbank (Lynnville)
Mbombela United	KaNyamazane Stadium	Nelspruit (KaNyamazane)
Middleburg Mighty Saints	Mhluzi Stadium	Middelburg
Mighty Mega Force	Kriel Mine Stadium	Kriel
Mologadi	AJ Swanepoel Stadium	Ermelo
MP Highlanders	Thulamahashe New Stadium	Bushbuckridge (Thulamahashe)
Phiva Young Stars	Driekoppies Stadium	Driekoppies
Secunda Stars	Embalenhle Stadium	Secunda (Embalenhle)
Sekhukhune Lions	AJ Swanepoel Stadium	Ermelo
Sivutsa Stars	Kabokweni Stadium	Nelspruit (Kabokweni)
Thabo All Stars	KaNyamazane Stadium	Nelspruit (KaNyamazane)

=== North-West Province ===
Map indicating the extent of North West within the Republic of South Africa

Pos	Team	Pld	W	D	L	GF	GA	GD	Pts
1	Garankuwa United	30	19	6	5	61	22	+39	63
2	North West Shining Stars	29	19	5	5	55	33	+22	62
3	Soshanguve Sunshine	29	18	7	4	65	32	+33	61
4	Real Stars	30	14	7	9	65	61	+4	49
5	Als Puk Tawana	30	14	3	13	59	45	+14	45
6	Inter SA	30	12	6	12	41	36	+5	42
7	Impala Warriors	30	12	6	12	48	49	−1	42
8	North West University	29	10	11	8	37	27	+10	41
9	Southern NW Stars	30	11	6	13	44	45	−1	39
10	Mamusa United	30	11	6	13	52	54	−2	39
11	Bakubung BK United	29	10	7	12	49	60	−11	37
12	City of Matlosana	30	10	6	14	41	54	−13	36
13	Moretele United	30	9	7	14	42	54	−12	34
14	Rustenburg Sea Eagles	30	10	3	17	36	53	−17	33
15	Oxygen	30	7	9	14	39	48	−9	30
16	Mothupi Birds United	30	3	3	24	26	87	−61	12

Leaving for 2011-12: Oxygen (relegated), Mothupi Birds United (relegated).
Joining for 2011-12: Two promoted teams from SAB Regional League.

Team name	Stadium	City
Als Puk Tawana	NWU Potchefstroom Campus	Potchefstroom
Bakubung BK United	Mogwase Stadium	Mogwase
City of Matlosana	Oppenheimer Stadium	Orkney
Garankuwa United	Pilditch Stadium	Pretoria (Note: Four teams were allowed to play outside the borders of North West Province, at stadiums in Pretoria.)
Impala Warriors	Rustenburg Hostel 8	Rustenburg
Inter SA	ACPP Sports Grounds	Pretoria
Mamusa United	Huhudi Stadium	Vryburg
Moretele United	Eersterust Stadium	Pretoria
Mothupi Birds United	Lehurutshe Stadium	Zeerust (Lehurutshe)
North West Shining Stars	Letlhabile Stadium	Brits (Lethlabile)
North West University	NWU Mafikeng Campus	Mafikeng
Oxygen	Itsoseng Stadium	Itsoseng
Real Stars	Matlosana Stadium	Klerksdorp
Rustenburg Sea Eagles	Olympia Stadium	Rustenburg
Soshanguve Sunshine	Giant Stadium	Pretoria (Soshanguve)
Southern NW Stars	Bafokeng Sports Campus	Phokeng

== Provincial winners decided by appeal cases ==
The first 4 out of 9 provincial winners, were decided without any appeal case being involved, after the last round of Vodacom League in April 2011. For the other five divisions in Eastern Cape, Northern Cape, Free State, Limpopo and North-West, the provincial winners were only found by 5 June, after the SAFA disciplinary committee and Sports Court had judged one or several appeal cases in each division. The list below summarizes the outcome of all those cases.

- In the Eastern Cape division: An appeal was filed by runner-up Tornado (62p), asking SAFA to deduct FC Buffalo (68p) minimum 6p, for the alleged use of an ineligible player. This appeal was however rejected by SAFA.
- In the Northern Cape division: The appeal was about the initial 2–2 result, of a match played between the two log leaders Real Madrid (75p) and Steach United (74p). If SAFA had decided to award a "disciplinary defeat" for Real Madrid, then it would have been Steach United to be crowned as divisional winner. The decision however was, to let the result achieved on the playing field stand, and thus Real Madrid managed to win the division with 1p ahead of Steach United.
- In the Free State division: The first important appeal concerned an undecided match, between the runner-up Botshabelo against one of the other teams in the division. As Botshabelo managed to win their appeal, they gained 3 additional points and thus moved up to become the new winner of the division, ahead of Roses United. At the same time, Roses United however had appealed their 2–1 defeat against Sasolburg Juventus, asking for the result to be changed into a victory for Roses United, due to the match being unfairly abrupt after 75 minutes, when several rugby fans suddenly invaded the pitch. This last appeal was upheld by SAFA, awarding a 2–0 victory to Roses United, and thus they managed to win the division ahead of Botshabelo.
- In the Limpopo division: After Baroka had won the division by 15p over Winners Park, the runner-up lodged an appeal claiming Baroka had fielded an ineligible player, and thus should be deducted minimum 15 points. This appeal was however rejected by SAFA.
- In the North-West division: All top-3 teams were each involved in two or three appeal cases. As Soshanguve Sunshine did not win any of their appeals, while the other two teams each managed to win one of their appeals, the log ended at 15 May, with Garankuwa United (63p) as 1st, NW Shining Stars (62p) as 2nd, and Soshanguve Sunshine (61p) as 3rd. Around 31 May, the appeal drama was however reignited, as two of the previously solved cases involving NW Shining Stars, result-wise were reverted to "a pending matter". The two unsolved appealed matches for the team, was a 2–0 win against Oxygen from 16 April, and a 2–3 defeat against Real Stars from 26 February. The Sports Court made a final decision at 1 June, to upheld the result of the first match, and award a new 2–0 result for NW Shining Stars in the second match against Real Stars; as the former result was ruled to be "unfairly achieved". Thus, the arbitration by the Sports Court, had now moved NW Shining Stars up at 65p in the log, which at this point of time meant, that they were now at a position to win the division.
  SAFA however announced at 2 June, that the team now also was involved in a third appeal. This time it was Soshanguve Sunshine pushing forward a final appeal to the Sports Court, to overrule the initial disciplinary decision by SAFA, for the imposed 0–2 defeat against NW Shining Stars. The case arose after allegations by NW Shining Stars, that Soshanguve Sunshine had fielded an unregistered player (Benjamin Nthethe) in the match between the two log leaders at 19 March, and thus had achieved their victory at the playing field by unfair means. SAFA initially agreed. If the Sports Court decide to nullify SAFAs decision, it will however mean, that the initial win for Soshanguve Sunshine will stand. In that case, Soshanguve will be crowned as the final winner of the division, with a total of 64p in the log, while NW Shining Stars has to settle with only 62p and a second place. If the court settle the case between the two opponents as a draw -i.e. due to disciplinary violations committed by both teams in the match-, then we have a tight situation, with Garankuwa United taking the final win of the division, with 63p and a better goal score than NW Shining Stars. The result of this last appeal was apparently decided at 5 June, with Garankuwa as the new final winner of the division. No references have yet been published to confirm the exact details about the final decision of the Sports Court.

== Playoff stage ==
At the playoff stage, a round robin format with two groups, comprising respectively the 5 provincial winners from the Coastal stream and the 4 provincial winners from the Inland stream, were set to decide the two promoting teams for the National First Division. A final match to decide the overall Vodacom League champion, will finally also be arranged between the two promoted group winners. The playoffs were planned to take place at 7–12 June 2011 in Cape Town, at the venues Erica Park and Philippi Stadium. Upon inspection of the fields at 6 June, the quality at Erica Park was however found to be inadequate. SAFA therefore decided, instead to organise all matches at Philippi Stadium and the nearby UWC Stadium.

=== Group A (Coastal) ===
Pos	Team	Pld	W	D	L	GF	GA	GD	Pts
1	Chippa United (Western Cape)	4	3	1	0	7	1	+6	10
2	Buffalo (Eastern Cape)	4	2	2	0	7	3	+4	8
3	Roses United (Free State)	4	2	1	1	4	5	−1	7
4	Durban Stars (KwaZulu-Natal)	4	1	0	3	2	5	−3	3
5	Real Madrid (Northern Cape)	4	0	0	4	1	7	−6	0

Match results:

7 June 2011 (12:00)

Durban Stars	0–1	Roses United
	report	Kenoshi Motshegwa

Philippi Stadium
7 June 2011 (15:00)

Chippa United	0–0	Buffalo
	report

Philippi Stadium
8 June 2011 (12:00)

Chippa United	2–0	Real Madrid
Andile Mbenyane (2)	report

UWC Stadium
8 June 2011 (12:00)

Buffalo	1–1	Roses United
Loyolo Mbiko Nomdlelo	report	Alex Ngomane

Philippi Stadium
9 June 2011 (15:00)

Real Madrid	0–1	Roses United
	report	Alex Ngomane

UWC Stadium
9 June 2011 (15:00)

Buffalo	3–1	Durban Stars
Matseothata November; Lesly Baloyi; Pikolomzi Noqazo	report	Khulakani Magubane

Philippi Stadium
10 June 2011 (12:00)

Roses United	1–4	Chippa United
Lebohang Kukame	report	Roscoe Pieterson; Clayton Edem; Diego Brown (2)

Philippi Stadium
10 June 2011 (12:00)

Durban Stars	1–0	Real Madrid
Khulekani Magubane	report

UWC Stadium
11 June 2011 (12:00)

Real Madrid	1–3	Buffalo
Tshepo Modise	report	Mfondo Bonyongo; Solomzi Makholwa (2)

Philippi Stadium
11 June 2011 (12:00)

Chippa United	1–0	Durban Stars
Diego Brown	report

UWC Stadium

=== Group B (Inland) ===
Pos	Team	Pld	W	D	L	GF	GA	GD	Pts
1	Sivutsa Stars (Mpumalanga)	3	3	0	0	4	0	+4	9
2	Baroka (Limpopo)	3	2	0	1	5	3	+2	6
3	Garankuwa United (North-West)	3	0	1	2	3	6	−3	1
4	Highlands Park (Gauteng)	3	0	1	2	1	4	−3	1

Match results:

8 June 2011 (15:00)

Baroka	2–0	Highlands Park
Katlego Mashego; Thobani Mncwango	report

Philippi Stadium
8 June 2011 (15:00)

Garankuwa United	0–2	Sivutsa Stars
	report	Ennocent Mkhabela; Bongani Masinga

UWC Stadium
9 June 2011 (12:00)

Baroka	0–1	Sivutsa Stars
	report	Velile Zitha

Philippi Stadium
9 June 2011 (12:00)

Highlands Park	1–1	Garankuwa United
Professor Ramorwasi	report	Lebogang Moilewa

UWC Stadium
10 June 2011 (15:00)

Sivutsa Stars	1–0	Highlands Park
Velile Zitha	report

UWC Stadium
10 June 2011 (15:00)

Garankuwa United	2–3	Baroka
Tshepang Mabatla; Mutomi Mosena	report	Msimeli Baloyi; Johannes Ramatsela (2)

Philippi Stadium

=== Playoff Final ===
12 June 2011 (15:00)

Chippa United	1–0	Sivutsa Stars
Robin Rhode	report

Philippi Stadium

=== Playoff honours ===
A number of awards were issued at the concluding ceremony.

Best referee	Robert Sithole
Best coach	Michael Lukhubeni (Chippa United)
Best goalkeeper	Vusumuzi Magagula (Sivutsa Stars)
Top goal scorer	Diego Brown (Chippa United, 3 goals)
Best overall player	Andile Mbeyane (Chippa United)
