= List of soccer stadiums in South Africa =

The following is a list of soccer stadiums in South Africa, ordered by capacity.

== Current stadiums ==
Image	Stadium	Capacity	City	Province	Home team(s)	Opened
	FNB Stadium	94,736	Johannesburg	Gauteng	Kaizer Chiefs F.C. South Africa national soccer team	2009
	Ellis Park Stadium	62,567	Johannesburg	Gauteng		1928
	Cape Town Stadium	55,000	Cape Town	Western Cape	Cape Town City F.C.	2009
	Moses Mabhida Stadium	55,000	Durban	KwaZulu-Natal	AmaZulu F.C.	2009
	Kings Park Stadium	54,000	Durban	KwaZulu-Natal		1891
	Loftus Versfeld Stadium	51,762	Pretoria	Gauteng	Mamelodi Sundowns F.C.	1906
	Nelson Mandela Bay Stadium	46,000	Gqeberha	Eastern Cape	Chippa United	2009
	Royal Bafokeng Stadium	44,530	Phokeng	North West		1999
	Mbombela Stadium	43,500	Mbombela	Mpumalanga	TS Galaxy	2009
	Free State Stadium	42,000	Bloemfontein	Free State		1995
	Peter Mokaba Stadium	41,733	Polokwane	Limpopo	Sekhukhune United	2010
	Orlando Stadium	40,000	Orlando	Gauteng	Orlando Pirates F.C.	2008
	Johannesburg Stadium	37,500	Johannesburg	Gauteng		1992
	Charles Mopeli Stadium	35,000	Phuthaditjhaba	Free State		
	Athlone Stadium	34,000	Cape Town	Western Cape	Cape Town Spurs	1972
	Olympia Park	30,000	Rustenburg	North West		1989
	Rand Stadium	30,000	Johannesburg	Gauteng		1951
	Lucas Moripe Stadium	28,900	Pretoria	Gauteng	Mamelodi Sundowns F.C.	
	Independence Stadium	25,000	Mthatha	Eastern Cape	Umtata Bush Bucks	1976
	Vosloorus Stadium	25,000	Ekurhuleni	Gauteng		
	Dobsonville Stadium	24,000	Johannesburg	Gauteng		1975
	Chatsworth Stadium	22,000	Durban	KwaZulu-Natal	Durban City	
	Bellville Stadium	20,000	Cape Town	Western Cape		1992
	Kaizer Sebothelo Stadium	20,000	Botshabelo	Free State	Mathaithai	
	Giyani Stadium	20,000	Giyani	Limpopo		
	Goble Park	20,000	Bethlehem	Free State		
	Moruleng Stadium	20,000	Moruleng	North West		2009
	Pilditch Stadium	20,000	Pretoria	Gauteng		
	Seisa Ramabodu Stadium	20,000	Bloemfontein	Free State		1982
	Thohoyandou Stadium	20,000	Thohoyandou	Limpopo	Black Leopards, Venda	
	Germiston Stadium	18,000	Germiston	Gauteng		
	Griqua Park	18,000	Kimberley	Northern Cape	Hungry Lions, United FC	
	Sisa Dukashe Stadium	17,000	Mdantsane	Eastern Cape		
	Buffalo City Stadium	16,000	East London	Eastern Cape		1934
	Danie Craven Stadium	16,000	Stellenbosch	Western Cape	Stellenbosch	1979
	Witbank Stadium	15,000	Witbank	Mpumalanga	Witbank Spurs F.C. (2010)	
	Kwa Masiza Stadium (Iscor Stadium)	15,000	Sebokeng	Gauteng	Vaal Professionals (to 2000)	
	KaNyamazane Stadium	15,000	Nelspruit	Mpumalanga	Mbombela United F.C., Thabo All Stars F.C.	
	Makhulong Stadium	15,000	Durban	KwaZulu-Natal		
	Old Peter Mokaba Stadium	15,000	Polokwane	Limpopo	Polokwane City, Magesi	1976
	Ruimsig Stadium	15,000	Johannesburg	Gauteng		
	Sinaba Stadium	15,000	Benoni	Gauteng		
	Seshego Stadium	15,000	Polokwane	Limpopo		
	Eldorado Park Stadium	12,000	Johannesburg	Gauteng	FC AK	
	Harry Gwala Stadium	12,000	Pietermaritzburg	KwaZulu-Natal	Royal AM (to 2025)	
	Princess Magogo Stadium	12,000	Durban	KwaZulu-Natal	Milford	
	Ackerville Stadium	11,000	Witbank	Mpumalanga	Calaska F.C.	
	Richards Bay Stadium	10,500	Richards Bay	KwaZulu-Natal	Richards Bay	
	King Zwelithini Stadium	10,000	Durban	KwaZulu-Natal	Lamontville Golden Arrows	
	Philippi Stadium	10,000	Cape Town	Western Cape		
	Bidvest Stadium (Milpark Stadium)	5,000	Johannesburg	Gauteng	Wits University	
	Solomon Mahlangu Stadium	5,000	KwaMhlanga	Mpumalanga	Casric Stars	

== Defunct stadiums ==
#	Stadium	Capacity	City	Province	Team	Opened	Closed	Demolished
1	Odi Stadium	60,000	Mabopane	Gauteng	Garankuwa United		2010	
2	Mmabatho Stadium	59,000	Mmabatho	North West		1981	2010	
3	Newlands Rugby Stadium	51,900	Cape Town	Western Cape	Cape Town Spurs F.C.	1919	2020	
4	EPRU Stadium	33,832	Gqeberha	Eastern Cape	Bay United	1959	2010	2019
5	HM Pitje Stadium	25,000	Mamelodi	Gauteng			2010	2023
6	PAM Brink Stadium	25,000	Springs	Gauteng		1949	2008	
7	Oppenheimer Stadium	23,000	Orkney	North West		1960	2011	

== See also ==
- List of African stadiums by capacity
- List of association football stadiums by capacity
- List of stadiums in South Africa
- Lists of stadiums
- Soccer in South Africa
