= List of stadiums in South Africa =

The following is a list of stadiums in South Africa, ordered by capacity. Stadiums in South Africa with a capacity of 5,000 or more are included.

== Existing stadiums ==
#	Stadium	Capacity	City	Province	Home team(s)	Images
1	FNB Stadium	94,736	Johannesburg	Gauteng	South Africa national team Kaizer Chiefs	
2	Ellis Park Stadium	62,567	Johannesburg	Gauteng	Golden Lions	
3	Odi Stadium	60,000	Mabopane	Gauteng	Unused	
4	Mmabatho Stadium	60,000	Mahikeng	North West	training ground for North-West University	
5	Cape Town Stadium	58,300	Cape Town	Western Cape	Cape Town City F.C. Stormers, Western Province	
6	Moses Mabhida Stadium	54,000	Durban	KwaZulu-Natal	AmaZulu	
7	Kings Park Stadium	52,000	Durban	KwaZulu-Natal	Sharks	
8	Newlands Stadium	51,900	Cape Town	Western Cape		
9	Loftus Versfeld Stadium	51,762	Pretoria	Gauteng	Blue Bulls	
10	Nelson Mandela Bay Stadium	48,459	Gqeberha	Eastern Cape	Eastern Province Elephants	
11	Mbombela Stadium	43,500	Mbombela	Mpumalanga	Pumas	
12	Royal Bafokeng Stadium	42,000	Rustenburg	North West		
13	Peter Mokaba Stadium	41,733	Polokwane	Limpopo	Sekhukhune United	
14	Free State Stadium	40,911	Bloemfontein	Free State	Cheetahs, Free State Cheetahs	
15	Orlando Stadium	40,000	Soweto	Gauteng	Orlando Pirates F.C.	
16	Johannesburg Stadium	37,500	Johannesburg	Gauteng	training ground for Golden Lions	
17	Charles Mopeli Stadium	35,000	Phuthaditjhaba	Free State	Maluti FET College F.C.	
18	Wanderers Stadium	34,000	Johannesburg	Gauteng	Highveld Lions cricket team, Gauteng cricket team	
19	Athlone Stadium	30,000	Cape Town	Western Cape	Cape Town Spurs	
20	Rand Stadium	30,000	Johannesburg	Gauteng	training ground for Orlando Pirates	
21	Giant Stadium	30,000	Soshanguve	Gauteng	Soshanguve Sunshine	
22	Olympia Park	30,000	Rustenburg	North West	no current tenant	
23	Lucas Moripe Stadium	28,900	Pretoria	Gauteng	no current tenant	
24	HM Pitje Stadium	25,000	Pretoria	Gauteng	Mamelodi Sundowns F.C.	
25	Tsakane Stadium	25,000	Tsakane	Gauteng	African All Stars	
26	Newlands Cricket Ground	25,000	Cape Town	Western Cape	Cape Cobras cricket team, Western Province cricket team	
27	Kingsmead Cricket Ground	25,000	Durban	KwaZulu-Natal	KwaZulu-Natal Dolphins	
28	Independence Stadium	25,000	Mthatha	Eastern Cape	Mthatha Bush Bucks F.C.	
29	Dobsonville Stadium	24,000	Soweto	Gauteng	Moroka Swallows F.C.	
30	Oppenheimer Stadium	23,000	Orkney	North West	no current tenant	
31	Chatsworth Stadium	22,000	Durban	KwaZulu-Natal	Durban City	
32	Centurion Park	22,000	Centurion	Gauteng	Titans cricket team, Northerns cricket team	
33	Dr. Petrus Molemela Stadium	22,000	Bloemfontein	Free State	No current tenant	
34	Moruleng Stadium	22,000	Moruleng	North West	No current tenant	
35	Olën Park	22,000	Potchefstroom	North West	Leopards	
36	Botshabelo Stadium	20,000	Bloemfontein	Free State	Botshabelo F.C.	
37	Goble Park	20,000	Bethlehem	Free State	No current tenant	
38	Buffalo Park	20,000	East London	Eastern Cape	Border cricket team, Warriors	
39	Giyani Stadium	20,000	Giyani	Limpopo	Ndengeza F.C.	
40	Pilditch Stadium	20,000	Pretoria	Gauteng	Garankuwa United F.C., Gauteng North Athletics	
41	Willowmoore Park	20,000	Benoni	Gauteng	Titans cricket team	
42	Mangaung Oval	20,000	Bloemfontein	Free State	Knights	
43	Thohoyandou Stadium	20,000	Thohoyandou	Limpopo	Black Leopards F.C.	
44	St George's Park Cricket Ground	19,000	Gqeberha	Eastern Cape	Eastern Province	
45	Griqua Park	18,000	Kimberley	Northern Cape	Griquas	
46	Senwes Park	18,000	Potchefstroom	North West	Highveld Lions	
47	Germiston Stadium	18,000	Germiston	Gauteng	Central Gauteng Athletics	
48	North West Stadium	17,000	Welkom	Free State	Griffons	
49	Sisa Dukashe Stadium	17,000	Mdantsane	Eastern Cape	Border Bulldogs	
50	Buffalo City Stadium	16,000	East London	Eastern Cape	Border Bulldogs	
51	Danie Craven Stadium	16,000	Stellenbosch	Western Cape	Stellenbosch University, Stellenbosch F.C.	
52	Ruimsig Stadium	15,000	Johannesburg	Gauteng	no current tenant	
53	Sinaba Stadium	15,000	Benoni	Gauteng	Benoni Premier United	
54	Iscor Stadium	15,000	Sebokeng	Gauteng	No current tenant	
55	Tshego Stadium	15,000	Polokwane	Limpopo	No current tenant	
56	KwaNyamazane Stadium	15,000	Mbombela	Mpumalanga	Mbombela United F.C.	
57	Puma Stadium	15,000	Witbank	Mpumalanga	Pumas	
58	Old Peter Mokaba Stadium	15,000	Polokwane	Limpopo	Polokwane City, Magesi	
59	Harry Gwala Stadium	12,000	Pietermaritzburg	KwaZulu-Natal	Midlands Wanderers	
60	Princess Magogo Stadium	12,000	Durban	KwaZulu-Natal	AmaZulu F.C.	
61	Pietermaritzburg Oval	12,000	Pietermaritzburg	KwaZulu-Natal	Natal Cricket	
62	Milpark	12,000	Johannesburg	Gauteng		
63	Eldorado Park Stadium	12,000	Johannesburg	Gauteng	F.C. AK	
64	De Beers Diamond Oval	11,000	Kimberley	Northern Cape	Griqualand West	
65	Ackerville Stadium	11,000	Witbank	Mpumalanga	Calaska F.C.	
66	Boland Stadium	11,000	Wellington	Western Cape	Boland Cavaliers	
67	Outeniqua Park	10,000	George	Western Cape	SWD Eagles	
68	Makhulong Stadium	10,000	Tembisa	Gauteng	Jomo Cosmos F.C.	
69	King Goodwill Zwelithini Stadium	10,000	Durban	KwaZulu-Natal	Lamontville Golden Arrows F.C.	
70	Silvermine Stadium	10,000	Cape Town	Western Cape	Avendale Athletico F.C.	
71	Philippi Stadium	10,000	Cape Town	Western Cape	No current tenant	
72	Boland Park	10,000	Paarl	Western Cape	Boland cricket team Cape Cobras; Paarl Rocks	
73	Isaac Wolfson Stadium	10,000	KwaZakele	Eastern Cape	Zwide United, PE Villagers, St. Cyprian and Sunday Stars amateur rugby clubs, City Lads Ladies FC	
74	Prince Mangosuthu Buthelezi Regional Stadium	10,000	Ulundi	Kwa-Zulu Natal	Njampela FC	
75	Themba Senamela Stadium	10,000	Witbank	Mpumalanga	No current tenant	
76	Mehlareng Stadium	10,000	Thembisa	Gauteng	Tembisa Sports Center FC	
77	North West Stadium	8,500	Welkom	Free State	Griffons	
78	Coetzenburg Stadium	8,000	Stellenbosch	Western Cape	Stellenbosch University; Stellenbosch F.C.	
79	Tuks Stadium	8,000	Hatfield, Pretoria	Gauteng	University of Pretoria F.C.	
80	Kabokweni Stadium	8,000	Kabokweni	Mpumalanga	TS Sporting F.C.	
81	Richards Bay Stadium	8,000	Richards Bay	KwaZulu-Natal	Richards Bay	
82	Barnard Stadium	7,000	Kempton Park	Gauteng	Valke	
83	Sugar Ray Xulu Stadium	6,500	Durban	KwaZulu-Natal	Real Kings F.C. Durban Ladies	
84	Alexandra Stadium	5,000	Johannesburg	Gauteng	Alexandra United and Northrand Local Football Association	
85	Isak Steyl Stadium	5,000	Vanderbijlpark	Gauteng	No current tenant	
86	Faure Street Stadium	5,000	Paarl	Western Cape	Multiple Sports	
87	Solomon Mahlangu Stadium	5,000	KwaMhlanga	Mpumalanga	Casric Stars; TS Galaxy Queens	

== See also ==
- List of soccer stadiums in South Africa
- List of African stadiums by capacity
- Lists of stadiums
