= 2009–10 SAFA Second Division =

Vodacom League
- Season: 2009–10
- Champions: FC AK
- Promoted: FC AK and Blackburn Rovers

The 2009–10 SAFA Second Division season, also known as Vodacom League due to a sponsoring deal at the time, took place in South Africa between August and April. The season was scheduled to begin and end one month earlier than normal, due to the country's 2010 FIFA World Cup preparation. The league is the third tier of South African football, and is divided geographically into five divisions in the Coastal Stream and four divisions in the Inland Stream.

== Coastal Stream ==
=== Eastern Cape Province ===
Eastern Cape within the Republic of South Africa

Pos	Team	Pld	W	D	L	GF	GA	GD	Pts
1	Blackburn Rovers	30	23	3	4	65	21	+44	72
2	Tornado	30	20	6	4	52	25	+27	66
3	Bush Bucks	30	18	7	5	66	19	+47	61
4	O.R. Tambo D.C.	30	15	7	8	43	24	+19	52
5	Young Stars	30	13	7	10	37	42	−5	46
6	Bay Academy	30	11	9	10	32	32	0	42
7	Royals	30	11	8	11	38	33	+5	41
8	Hotspurs (Note: new name: Matta Milan)	30	10	8	12	38	41	−3	38
9	Tembu Royals	30	10	8	12	29	33	−4	38
10	Manchester United	30	10	7	13	38	51	−13	37
11	Cloud 9	30	10	6	14	28	41	−13	36
12	Mthata Liverpool	30	9	5	16	24	43	−19	32
13	Matat Professionals	30	6	11	13	30	45	−15	29
14	The Guys (Note: new name: Buffalo)	30	5	12	13	32	46	−14	27
15	Mighty Greens	30	6	6	18	35	61	−26	24
16	African Juventus	30	4	8	18	31	61	−30	20

Source: https://www.rsssf.org/tablesz/zaf2010.html
Notes:

Leaving for 2010-11: Blackburn Rovers (promoted), African Juventus (relegated).
Joining for 2010-11: Happy Brothers (promoted), Kokstad Liverpool (promoted).

=== Free State Province ===
Free State within the Republic of South Africa

Pos	Team	Pld	W	D	L	GF	GA	GD	Pts
1	Roses United	30	26	4	0	73	15	+58	82
2	Maluti FET College	30	22	6	2	69	25	+44	72
3	Bloemfontein Young Tigers	30	17	6	7	50	29	+21	57
4	Tower United	30	14	7	9	60	46	+14	49
5	Hellas (Note: new name: Celtic Colts)	30	13	5	12	49	39	+10	44
6	Botshabelo	30	11	10	9	48	44	+4	43
7	Harmony	30	12	6	12	36	29	+7	42
8	Moving Spurs	30	13	2	15	40	45	−5	41
9	Sasolburg Juventus	30	11	8	11	41	47	−6	41
10	Mangaung City	30	11	7	12	49	60	−11	40
11	Super Eagles	30	10	6	14	38	47	−9	36
12	Free State Arsenal (Note: new name: Free State Champs)	30	8	5	17	27	55	−28	29
13	Liverpool BTX	30	7	7	16	32	44	−12	28
14	Harrismith United	30	7	4	19	24	53	−29	25
15	Welkom Real Hearts	30	7	3	20	26	57	−31	24
16	Milan United	30	5	6	19	22	49	−27	21

Source: https://www.rsssf.org/tablesz/zaf2010.html
Notes:

Leaving for 2010-11: Welkom Real Hearts (relegated), Milan United (relegated).
Joining for 2010-11: Bubchu United (promoted), United All Tigers (promoted).

=== KwaZulu-Natal Province ===
KwaZulu-Natal within the Republic of South Africa

Pos	Team	Pld	W	D	L	GF	GA	GD	Pts
1	Island	30	22	4	4	70	26	+44	70
2	African Wanderers	30	21	5	4	61	23	+38	68
3	Newcastle Sicilians	30	17	6	7	48	30	+18	57
4	Amajuba United Killers	30	14	7	9	45	36	+9	49
5	KwaMashu All Stars	30	13	8	9	47	36	+11	47
6	Wembezi Juventus	30	14	2	14	42	41	+1	44
7	Sobantu Shooting Stars	30	12	5	13	36	32	+4	41
8	Rangers (Note: new name: Real Classic)	30	11	6	13	36	37	−1	39
9	Durban Warriors	30	10	9	11	23	25	−2	39
10	Abaqulusi	30	10	8	12	36	48	−12	38
11	Dundee XI Experience	30	10	7	13	42	47	−5	37
12	Globe City (Note: new name: Durban Stars)	30	10	7	13	35	43	−8	37
13	Bright Stars	30	10	6	14	41	47	−6	36
14	Maritzburg City	30	10	3	17	34	50	−16	33
15	Brazil	30	8	8	14	29	49	−20	32
16	Durban Stars (will merge with Globe City)	30	2	1	27	17	72	−55	7

Source: https://www.rsssf.org/tablesz/zaf2010.html
Notes:

Leaving for 2010-11: Brazil (relegated), Durban Stars (2nd team will disband).
Joining for 2010-11: SAPS Callies (promoted), Gqikazi All Stars (promoted).

=== Northern Cape Province ===
Northern Cape within the Republic of South Africa

Pos	Team	Pld	W	D	L	GF	GA	GD	Pts
1	Kakamas Sundowns	30	19	6	5	56	22	+34	63
2	Wings United	30	18	8	4	61	28	+33	62
3	Real Madrid	30	18	5	7	57	34	+23	59
4	Olympics	30	16	7	7	51	28	+23	55
5	Young Pirates	30	15	10	5	43	21	+22	55
6	Steach United	30	16	6	8	59	43	+16	54
7	William Prescod	30	11	9	10	49	39	+10	42
8	Kakamas Juventus	30	10	12	8	57	55	+2	42
9	Charlton	30	10	10	10	44	37	+7	40
10	Morester Jeug	30	10	7	13	44	68	−24	37
11	Wanderers	30	9	6	15	49	69	−20	33
12	Kakamas Cosmos	30	7	8	15	33	48	−15	29
13	Amalawus	30	8	5	17	28	48	−20	29
14	Louisvale Pirates	30	7	3	20	31	62	−31	24
15	Namaqua Stars	30	4	9	17	29	42	−13	21
16	Kuruman Rovers	30	5	3	22	34	81	−47	18

Source: https://www.rsssf.org/tablesz/zaf2010.html

Leaving for 2010-11: Namaqua Stars (relegated), Kuruman Rovers (relegated).
Joining for 2010-11: North East Celtics (promoted), Ray Madrid (promoted).

=== Western Cape Province ===
Western Cape within the Republic of South Africa

Pos	Team	Pld	W	D	L	GF	GA	GD	Pts
1	Mitchells Plain United	30	21	7	2	71	25	+46	70
2	Milano United	30	21	5	4	64	23	+41	68
3	WP United	30	14	7	9	45	33	+12	49
4	Mr Price Parkhurst (Note: new name: Cape Town All Stars)	30	14	7	9	44	33	+11	49
5	Old Mutual Academy	30	12	9	9	47	40	+7	45
6	Baltic Rangers	30	11	9	10	56	44	+12	42
7	Mbekweni United	30	10	9	11	35	42	−7	39
8	Knysna Bafana	30	10	9	11	42	58	−16	39
9	Kuils River (Note: new name: Tygerberg)	30	10	8	12	32	35	−3	38
10	Ajax Cape Town U19	30	10	7	13	52	54	−2	37
11	Battswood	30	11	4	15	34	37	−3	37
12	Royal Blues	30	10	6	14	36	55	−19	36
13	Mbekweni Cosmos (Note: new name: Chippa United)	30	10	5	15	48	48	0	35
14	Steenberg United	30	9	8	13	32	36	−4	35
15	Stellenbosch University	30	7	10	13	37	46	−9	31
16	Briton Stars	30	4	2	24	23	89	−66	14

Source: https://www.rsssf.org/tablesz/zaf2010.html
Notes:

Leaving for 2010-11: Stellenbosch University (relegated), Briton Stars (relegated).
Joining for 2010-11: Beaufortwest City (promoted), Jomo Powers (promoted), Ikapa Sporting (relegated).

== Inland Stream ==
=== Gauteng Province ===
Gauteng within the Republic of South Africa

Pos	Team	Pld	W	D	L	GF	GA	GD	Pts
1	FC AK	32	22	7	3	66	33	+33	73
2	M Tigers	32	22	6	4	52	29	+23	72
3	Soweto Panthers	32	18	8	6	59	31	+28	62
4	Trabzon	32	15	8	9	48	36	+12	53
5	City Tigers (Note: new name: The Vardos)	32	15	8	9	36	35	+1	53
6	Lusitano (Note: new name: Blackpool)	32	16	4	12	30	31	−1	52
7	Highlands Park	32	13	10	9	38	32	+6	49
8	Bid Boys	32	12	10	10	53	47	+6	46
9	Yebo Yes United	32	11	7	14	46	40	+6	40
10	African All Stars	32	10	9	13	52	53	−1	39
11	Arcadia Shepherds	32	10	8	14	44	48	−4	38
12	Real Barcelona	32	9	8	15	35	45	−10	35
13	Berea - Albion	32	6	15	11	31	38	−7	33
14	Alexandra United	32	7	12	13	29	41	−12	33
15	Benoni Premier United	32	7	8	17	32	60	−28	29
16	Senaoana Blackpool	32	7	1	24	27	59	−32	22
17	Abakah	32	6	3	23	28	48	−20	21

Source: https://www.rsssf.org/tablesz/zaf2010.html
Notes:

Leaving for 2010-11: FC AK (promoted), Senaoana Blackpool (relegated), Abakah (relegated).
Joining for 2010-11: Supersport United 2nd team (promoted), Lesedi Shooting Stars (promoted).

=== Limpopo Province ===
Limpopo within the Republic of South Africa

Pos	Team	Pld	W	D	L	GF	GA	GD	Pts
1	Peace Lovers	30	26	3	1	95	18	+77	81
2	Limpopo United (Note: new name: Phalaborwa Real Rovers)	30	24	4	2	75	13	+62	76
3	All Nation Shining Stars (Note: new name: Vhembe)	30	23	4	3	58	20	+38	73
4	Naughty Boys	30	20	2	8	57	21	+36	62
5	Baroka	30	16	6	8	59	28	+31	54
6	Dundee United (Note: new name: Phungo All Stars)	30	13	8	9	52	42	+10	47
7	The Dolphins	30	10	8	12	34	35	−1	38
8	Mighty	30	11	4	15	38	47	−9	37
9	Modimolle Aces	30	10	4	16	40	45	−5	34
10	Lephalale Young Killers	30	10	4	16	37	46	−9	34
11	Lephalale Young Cosmos (Note: new name: Nobela All Stars)	30	10	4	16	51	64	−13	34
12	Fanang Diatla	30	8	5	17	26	60	−34	29
13	Mahwelereng United (Note: new name: Karee Young Stars)	30	7	6	17	31	73	−42	27
14	Tebcon	30	6	3	21	25	80	−55	21
15	Bahwiti	30	5	5	20	33	87	−54	20
16	Z. Mathote Elephants	30	3	6	21	14	46	−32	15

Source: https://www.rsssf.org/tablesz/zaf2010.html
Notes:

Leaving for 2010-11: Tebcon (relegated), Bahwiti (relegated), Z. Mathote Elephants (relegated).
Joining for 2010-11: Blue Rocks (promoted), Maniini All Blacks (promoted), Winners Park (relegated).

=== Mpumalanga Province ===
Mpumalanga within the Republic of South Africa

Pos	Team	Pld	W	D	L	GF	GA	GD	Pts
1	Mologadi	30	21	2	7	63	20	+43	65
2	Barberton City Stars	30	16	9	5	68	39	+29	57
3	Secunda Stars	29	17	6	6	58	37	+21	57
4	Mighty Mega Force	30	16	8	6	47	22	+25	56
5	Witbank Citylads (Note: new name: Calaska)	30	15	4	11	47	43	+4	49
6	Aces Academy (Note: new name: Amazayoni)	30	13	8	9	44	27	+17	47
7	Manchester (Note: new name: Sivutsa Stars)	30	12	8	10	46	43	+3	44
8	Benfica	29	11	10	8	41	38	+3	43
9	ELB Movers (Note: new name: Mbombela United)	30	11	3	16	37	46	−9	36
10	Middleburg Mighty Saints	30	10	5	15	42	50	−8	35
11	MP Highlanders	30	10	5	15	32	60	−28	35
12	Sekhukhune Lions	30	7	10	13	27	38	−11	31
13	Enhlanzeni Barcelona (Note: new name: Phiva Young Stars)	30	7	9	14	42	60	−18	30
14	Henemat	30	8	4	18	34	60	−26	28
15	Citizen	30	7	6	17	32	57	−25	27
16	York	30	6	7	17	35	55	−20	25

Source: https://www.rsssf.org/tablesz/zaf2010.html
Notes:

Leaving for 2010-11: Citizen (relegated), York (relegated).
Joining for 2010-11: Lynville All Stars (promoted), Thabo All Stars (promoted).

=== North-West Province ===
North West within the Republic of South Africa

Pos	Team	Pld	W	D	L	GF	GA	GD	Pts
1	Garankuwa United	30	20	6	4	72	20	+52	66
2	City of Matlosana United	30	19	6	5	78	33	+45	63
3	North West University	30	16	7	7	54	33	+21	55
4	North West Shining Stars	30	14	10	6	44	29	+15	52
5	Als Puk Tawana	30	12	11	7	66	37	+29	47
6	Impala Warriors	30	10	13	7	36	38	−2	43
7	Inter SA	30	12	6	12	42	46	−4	42
8	RNB 54 (Note: new name: Soshanguve Sunshine)	30	11	8	11	60	66	−6	41
9	Kgale United (Note: new name: Rustenburg Sea Eagles)	30	11	8	11	59	72	−13	41
10	Klerksdorp Digagabi (Note: new name: Real Stars)	30	10	9	11	45	41	+4	39
11	Southern NW Stars	30	9	5	16	43	62	−19	32
12	Moretele United	30	8	7	15	41	48	−7	31
13	Mothupi Birds Utd	30	9	3	18	38	51	−13	30
14	Oxygen	30	7	8	15	37	55	−18	29
15	Sea Rovers	30	5	10	15	39	74	−35	25
16	Bophirima NW Stars	30	5	7	18	31	80	−49	22

Source: https://www.rsssf.org/tablesz/zaf2010.html
Notes:

Leaving for 2010-11: Sea Rovers (relegated), Bophirima NW Stars (relegated).
Joining for 2010-11: Mamusa United (promoted), Bakubung BK (promoted).

== Playoff stage ==
The nine provincial winners were drawn into a round robin stage. The five Coastal stream teams and four Inland stream teams were put respectively into Group A and Group B. All the playoff matches were played from 6–12 April, at two big stadiums in the Mpumalanga region: Themba Senamela Stadium in Mhluzi, Middelburg and Ackerville Stadium in eMalahleni. The respective winners of the two groups, would both gain promotion to the National First Division, beside meeting each other in a last show-off final, where only the champion honour was at stake.

=== Group A (Coastal) ===
Pos	Team	Pld	W	D	L	GF	GA	GD	Pts
1	Blackburn Rovers (Eastern Cape)	4	3	0	1	10	4	+6	9
2	Mitchells Plain United (Western Cape)	4	2	1	1	9	4	+5	7
3	Roses United (Free State)	4	2	1	1	9	4	+5	7
4	Island (KwaZulu-Natal)	4	1	1	2	5	9	−4	4
5	Kakamas Sundowns (Northern Cape)	4	0	1	3	4	19	−15	1

=== Group B (Inland) ===
Pos	Team	Pld	W	D	L	GF	GA	GD	Pts
1	FC AK (Gauteng)	3	2	1	0	9	3	+6	7
2	Peace Lovers (Limpopo)	3	1	2	0	6	3	+3	5
3	Mologadi (Mpumalanga)	3	1	0	2	4	10	−6	3
4	Garankuwa United (North West)	3	0	1	2	3	6	−3	1

=== Playoff final ===
12 April 2010

FC AK	3 - 2	Blackburn Rovers
	Report

Ackerville Stadium
