= Cloud 9 F.C. =

African Winners
- Founded: 1989
- Ground: Bhisho Stadium
- Capacity: N/A
- Owner: Anele Mbambani
- League: Vodacom League, Eastern Cape Province
- 2010-11 season: 10

African Winners is a South African association football club founded in 1989. The team originate from King William's Town in the Eastern Cape. Since September 2010, they have been competing in the Eastern Cape stream of Vodacom League, with the new name Cloud 9.

== History ==
By the end of the 2009–10 season, the team had won SAFA Amathole-SAB Stream B, and thereby qualified for the Amathole District Championship, to be held 13 March at Jan Smuts Stadium in East London, Eastern Cape. Each year the two best teams from Stream A and Stream B will meet at the District Championship to decide the overall champion after a round robin stage. The overall District champion will then subsequently participate at the Provincial Playoffs for Vodacom League.

African Winners managed to win the Regional Amathole District Championship 2010, after a: 2–0 win against FC Buffalo, 3–1 win against Young Aces and a 2–2 draw against TUBS. The next challenge was to participate at the SAB-Castle Regional League Provincial Playoffs, to be held May 2010 in Port Elizabeth, where the two best teams would win promotion to the Vodacom League. The provincial playoffs were however won by Happy Brothers and Kokstad Liverpool, with African Winners finishing just behind. At first this meant no qualification for African Winners to the Vodacom League, but the team then decided to buy the league franchise held by the team Cloud 9, and thereby bought themselves a ticket to the Vodacom League.

As a curiosity, one of the teams local rivals from the Amathole District, FC Buffalo, at the same time opted to follow the same economical promotion path to the Eastern Cape Stream of Vodacom League, as they purchased the Franchise position from The Guys F.C.

Despite the fact, that African Winners ahead of the 2010–11 season had bought the Vodacom League Franchise from Cloud 9, it can be seen from the data published by SAFA, that the club apparently decided to trash their old name, and preferred to continue in the 2010–11 season with the name Cloud 9, at the venue Bredbach Sport Field.
