= Miguel Timm =

South African footballer

Personal information
- Full name: Miguel Raoul Timm
- Date of birth: 31 January 1992 (age 34)
- Place of birth: Durban, South Africa
- Position: Midfielder

Team information
- Current team: Hope FC
- Number: 6

Youth career
- 2004–2005: Ajax Cape Town
- 2005–2011: Supersport United

Senior career*
Years	Team	Apps	(Gls)
2011–2014	Bidvest Wits	22	(1)
2014–2015	Mpumalanga Black Aces	34	(3)
2016–2017	Phoenix Rising	26	(0)
2018–2019	Chippa United	3	(0)
2019–2020	Maritzburg United	33	(0)
2020–2022	TTM/Marumo Gallants	46	(0)
2022–2025	Orlando Pirates	46	(0)
2025–2026	Sekhukhune United	10	(0)
2026	Cape Town City		
2026-	Hope FC		
- * Club domestic league appearances and goals as of 4 January 2026

Miguel Timm (born 31 January 1992) is a South African football midfielder who currently plays for Hope FC.

== Career ==
Timm was born in Durban, South Africa, but was raised in Johannesburg. His youth career began in a suburb in South Johannesburg called Mondeor.

He soon started to attract the likes of Orlando Pirates FC and SuperSport United F.C. academies. After a brief stint with Orlando Pirates FC U-12's he went to play in Ajax Cape Town F.C.'s development.

Miguel's professional playing career started with Bidvest Wits FC between 2011 and 2014 and then for Mpumalanga Black Aces F.C. from 2014 to 2015. Timm played in the United States with Phoenix Rising between 2016 and 2018. After returning to South Africa he played for Chippa United, Maritzburg United and TTM/Marumo Gallants. He won the 2020–21 Nedbank Cup with TTM.

On 5 November 2022, Timm won the 2022 MTN 8 with Orlando Pirates after defeating AmaZulu in the final, with Timm named man of the match.
