= Bongi Ntuli =

South African soccer player (1991–2023)

Personal information
- Full name: Bonginkosi Ntuli
- Date of birth: 28 March 1991
- Place of birth: Pietermaritzburg, South Africa
- Date of death: 5 November 2023 (aged 32)
- Place of death: Pietermaritzburg, South Africa
- Height: 1.80 m (5 ft 11 in)
- Position: Striker

Youth career
- 2009–2011: Sobantu Shooting Stars
- 2011–2012: Golden Arrows B

Senior career*
Years	Team	Apps	(Gls)
2012–2014	Golden Arrows	54	(13)
2014–2019	Mamelodi Sundowns	1	(0)
2015	→ AmaZulu (loan)	12	(6)
2015–2018	→ Platinum Stars (loan)	63	(14)
2018	→ AmaZulu (loan)	15	(5)
2019–2023	AmaZulu	85	(35)
Total		230	(73)
- * Club domestic league appearances and goals

Bonginkosi Ntuli (28 March 1991 – 5 November 2023) was a South African professional soccer player who played as a striker for AmaZulu.

== Career ==
Ntuli began his career in the Vodacom League with Sobantu Shooting Stars before joining the Golden Arrows reserve team. He made his debut for Arrows in January 2012. He went on to join Mamelodi Sundowns in 2014, however, he battled to break into the team and six months later he joined AmaZulu on loan. From 2015 to 2018, Ntuli was on loan at Platinum Stars.

In July 2018, Ntuli went on trial with Djurgårdens IF. This due to Ntuli and Djurgården not being able to agree on the financials of his deal. In August 2018, it was confirmed that Ntuli had joined AmaZulu on loan, with his deal becoming permanent after being part of a swap deal which saw him stay onboard with AmaZulu and Emiliano Tade go the other way and join Sundowns.

== Death ==
Bongi Ntuli died from a rare form of cancer in Pietermaritzburg, on 5 November 2023, at the age of 32. His last soccer game happened only seven weeks earlier, on 17 September 2023.
