= Real Madrid (South Africa) =

- Full name: Real Madrid Football Club
- Nickname: Valentines’ Boys
- Founded: 1987
- Ground: Galeshewe Stadium, Galeshewe, Kimberley, Northern Cape, South Africa
- Capacity: N/A
- Owner: Lucky Mohayi
- Chairman: Tate Moyahi
- Manager: Andrew Seleka
- Coach: Olebogeng Wesi
- League: SAFA Second Division; Northern Cape province
- 2020–21 season: 8th
Home colours	Away colours	Third colours

Real Madrid is a semi-professional association football club, based in the Galeshewe suburb of Kimberley, in the Northern Cape province of South Africa. The club was initially established in 1987 with the name Ipogeng Stars. As the founder and current president of the club, Andrew Seleka, was a big fan of Real Madrid, he decided to rename the club Real Madrid in 1989. After having ended the 2005–06 season as fourth, in the Free State province of the Vodacom League, they were hit by financial troubles, and had to sell their league status.

They underwent a change of ownership in June 2006, after which they gained promotion from the SAB Regional League in 2008. In both the 2008–09 and 2010–11 seasons, Real Madrid managed to win the Northern Cape province of Vodacom League, but subsequently fell short at the Promotional Play-offs, to also win promotion for the National First Division. Currently they still compete in the SAFA Second Division.

== Best achievements ==
- Winners of the SAFA Second Division (known as the Vodacom League for sponsorship reasons) Northern Cape Province: 2008–09 and 2010–11.
- Reached the 1/16-Finals (round 32) in the 2009 Nedbank Cup, where they were defeated 1–0 by Peace Lovers.
- Reached the 1/16-Finals (round 32) in the 2010–11 Nedbank Cup, where they were defeated 5–0 by AmaZulu

== Historical League results ==
The highest competing level of Real Madrid in 1987–2011, was at the third level of South African football.
Due to a lack of sources, their league results from 1987 to 2005 are not included below.

- 2005–06 (VL) – 4th (in Free State)
- 2006–07 (RL) – ??
- 2007–08 (RL) – 1st (in Northern Cape → promoted)
- 2008–09 (VL) – 1st (in Northern Cape)
- 2009–10 (VL) – 3rd (in Northern Cape)
- 2010–11 (VL) – 1st (in Northern Cape)

=== Vodacom League playoffs ===
At the Promotional play-offs in 2008–09, Real Madrid were defeated in all of their four played games.

After the 2010–11 season, uncertainty existed for a while, if the club indeed had won the Northern Cape division and qualified for the play-offs. The log listed them with 75 points, being 1 point more than their league rivals Steach United. When the two teams met in spring 2011, the match had been abrupt in second half with the score 2–2, and after the season, Steach United lodged an appeal to have a replay of the match. SAFA however decided, to let the result achieved on the playing field stand, and thus Real Madrid managed to win the division with 1p ahead of Steach United. At the Promotional play-offs in 2010–11, the team delivered a repeat of the disappointing performance in 2008–09, as they again lost all of their four played games.

== Stadium ==
The club always played their home games at stadiums in Kimberley. During their spell in 2006–08 at the SAB Regional League, the exact name of the stadium is however unknown. Ever since the clubs return to Vodacom League in June 2008, they have been playing all home games at Galeshewe Stadium. As a curiosity, this home venue is currently being shared, with the clubs fellow league rivals from Steach United.
