= Mpho Tshivhase =

South African philosopher (b. 1986)

- Born: 21 April 1986 (age 40); Makwarela, South Africa

Education
- Education: University of Johannesburg

Philosophical work
- Region: Applied philosophy
- Main interests: African philosophy, applied ethics, philosophy of psychology

Mpho Tshivhase is a South African philosopher who teaches at the University of Pretoria. In April 2018, Tshivhase became the first black woman to receive a PhD in philosophy in all of South Africa. Tshivhase teaches applied ethics and her research is focused on uniqueness and individuality.

== History ==
Mpho Tshivhase's academic studies began at the University of Johannesburg in psychology. Later, at the graduate level, Tshivhase entered philosophy proper, where she completed her Master's thesis research on personal identity.

Tshivhase's doctoral dissertation, entitled “Towards a Normative Theory of Uniqueness of Persons,” was supervised by Thaddeus Metz. As the first black South African woman to receive a PhD in philosophy, Tshivhase was celebrated and the Independent Online described her achievements as "pioneering." Tshivhase's achievement also led to discussions on the sociology of race and ethnic relations in South Africa.

== Research ==
A primary question in Tshivase's research is whether uniqueness is an element of personal development that is worth pursuing at the expense of other things. Her overarching research concern aims to delineate what uniqueness amongst persons is (a mix combination of rarity, irreplacability and incomparability that is constructed through a process that involves autonomy and authenticity, rather than a given quality) and how humans relate to the concept of uniqueness.

== See also ==
- Africana philosophy
