= Thaddeus Metz =

American philosopher (born 1968)

- Born: 1968 (age 57–58)
- Occupation: Philosopher

Academic background
- Education: Cornell University

Academic work
- Discipline: Philosophy
- Sub-discipline: The meaning of life; ethics; political philosophy; philosophy of law; African philosophy; non-Western philosophy
- Institutions: University of Pretoria

Thaddeus Metz (born 1968) is an American philosopher, academic and author who has lectured at mainly South African universities. He currently teaches at the University of Pretoria.

== Education and career ==
Metz earned a PhD from the Sage School of Philosophy at Cornell University in 1997. In 2015, Metz was appointed to the position of Distinguished Professor at the University of Johannesburg, a position he held until 2020. This was followed by a position as Research Professor of Philosophy at the University of Pretoria in 2020.

Metz has supervised doctoral students from many different countries, including Mpho Tshivhase, the first African woman from South Africa to get a PhD in philosophy, and Doreen Sesiro, the first African woman from Botswana to do so.

== Philosophical work ==
Much of his work 'takes an analytic approach to African morality, the meaning of life, the nature of mental health, the point of a university, the role of a legal system, and a range of other topics in value theory and moral-political philosophy'. In particular, he (alongside Susan R. Wolf) is often credited for having helped develop life's meaning as a distinct field in Anglo-American philosophy. In recognition of having brought African philosophical ideas to global audiences of scholars, Metz was once designated one of ‘The World’s Top 50 Thinkers’ by Prospect Magazine.

== Bibliography ==
=== Books ===
- A Relational Theory of Justice: African Economic, Political, and Legal Philosophy in and Beyond the Continent (Oxford University Press, 2026). ISBN 9780192866745
- What Makes Life Meaningful? A Debate, with Joshua Seachris (London: Routledge, 2024). ISBN 9781032566153
- A Relational Moral Theory: African Ethics in and Beyond the Continent (Oxford: Oxford University Press, 2022). ISBN 9780198748960
- God,Soul and the Meaning of Life (Cambridge: Cambridge University Press, 2019). ISBN 9781108661652
- Meaning in Life: An Analytic Study (Oxford: Oxford University Press, 2013). ISBN 9780191747632

=== Articles ===
- Metz, Thaddeus (2012). An African Theory of Moral Status: A Relational Alternative to Individualism and Holism. Ethical Theory and Moral Practice 15 (3): 387-402.
- Metz, Thaddeus (2011). The Good, the True and the Beautiful: Toward a Unified Account of Great Meaning in Life. Religious Studies: An International Journal for the Philosophy of Religion 47 (4): 389-409.
- Metz, Thaddeus (2011). Ubuntu as a Moral Theory and Human Rights in South Africa. African Human Rights Law Journal 11 (2):532-559.
- Metz, Thaddeus and Gaie, Joseph (2010). The African Ethic of Ubuntu/Botho: Implications for Research on Morality. Journal of Moral Education 39 (3): 273-290.
- Metz, Thaddeus (2007). Toward an African Moral Theory. Journal of Political Philosophy 15 (3):321-341.
- Metz, Thaddeus (2002). Recent Work on the Meaning of Life. Ethics 112 (4):781-814.
- Metz, Thaddeus (2001). The Concept of a Meaningful Life. American Philosophical Quarterly 38 (2): 137-153.
- Metz, Thaddeus (2001). Respect for Persons and Perfectionist Politics. Philosophy and Public Affairs 30 (4): 417-442.

== Secondary literature ==
Special journal issues and books devoted to Metz's research include:

- Luis Cordeiro-Rodrigues, Joyline Gwara, Wang Jun, and Cornelius Ewuoso (eds) 'Thaddeus Metz, A Relational Moral Theory’, Ethical Theory and Moral Practice 29 (2026).
- Kirk Lougheed (ed.) 'Thaddeus Metz's A Relational Moral Theory’, Social Theory and Practice 51 (2025).
- Olatunji Oyeshile (ed.) 'On an African Moral Theory', African Philosophical Inquiry 11 (2023).
- Paul Slama and Carien Smith (eds) 'Meanings of Gods. Questions to Thaddeus Metz', International Journal of Philosophy and Theology 82 (2021).
- Yujin Nagasawa (ed.) 'Book Symposium: Thaddeus Metz's Meaning in Life', European Journal for Philosophy of Religion 8 (2016).
- Masahiro Morioka (ed.) Reconsidering Meaning in Life: A Philosophical Dialogue with Thaddeus Metz (Saitama, Japan: Waseda University, 2015).

== Honours ==
- Metz was designated one of "The World's Top 2% Scientists".
- Metz has been awarded an ‘A’ rating for the quality and impact of his research four times by the South African National Research Foundation.
- Metz was elected to the Academy of Science of South Africa.

== See also ==
- African philosophy
- Analytic philosophy
