= Ngwana Mohube Sports Ground =

Football stadium in Lebowakgomo, Limpopo, South Africa

- Ngwana Mohube Sports Complex
- Interactive map of Ngwana Mohube Sports Ground
- Location: Seleteng village, Ga-Mphahlele, Lebowakgomo, Limpopo, South Africa
- Coordinates: 24.3049°S 29.6234°E (NB: Might also be situated at 2km more to the East)
- Owner: Lepelle Nkumpi Municipality
- Capacity: N/A

Tenant
- Baroka F.C.

Ngwana Mohube Sports Ground, also commonly referred to as Ngwana Mohube Sports Complex, is a low level football stadium in the village Ga-Mphahlele; situated around 8 km East of Lebowakgomo and 60 km South of Polokwane, in the Limpopo province of South Africa.

Ngwana Mohube Sports Ground is situated at the very same address of the Secondary School.

== Football related tenants ==
Since June 2010, the main tenant of Ngwana Mohube Sports Ground is Baroka FC. This club is based in the same village, and currently compete at the third level of South African football, known as Vodacom League. As Baroka in 2008-10 had opted to play their home games at the somewhat greater Lebowakgomo Stadium, one might speculate, that at least the playing field of Ngwana Mohube Sports Ground, perhaps got improved in 2010.

== Facilities ==
The capacity of the Sports Ground is currently unknown. In regards of facilities, they were in April 2011 described as being second to none. Currently the Sports Ground lack some proper dressing rooms, and is even without toilets and running water.
