= Mayibuye Uprising =

Series of protests against apartheid in South Africa in 1952

The Mayibuye Uprising was a sequence of protests and demonstrations, led by the African National Congress, South African Indian Congress and the African People's Organisation that took place around No.2 Location Galeshewe, in Kimberley, on 7–8 November 1952. The uprising was not an isolated event, but part of the Defiance Campaign which started in June 1952. The aim of the campaign was to peacefully defy the laws of the apartheid government across the country.

== Cause of the uprising ==
The uprising came in reaction to some of the laws put in place by the National Party, which ruled from 1948–1994. These laws were deemed unjust and inhumane by numerous members of the community and thus, as part of the Defiance Campaign in Kimberley Dr Arthur Letele, who was the ANC branch chairperson of the No.2 Location, organized a group of volunteers to defy the apartheid laws.

Some of the laws under protest included:

- The Native Labour Regulation Act 1911, which resulted in the movement and remuneration control of the African that essentially established migrant labour and an average standard wage.
- The 1913 Native Land Act was passed to allocate only about 7% of arable land to Africans and leave the more fertile land for whites. This law incorporated territorial segregation into legislation for the first time since Union in 1910.
- The Population Registration Act of 1950, which required each inhabitant of South Africa to be classified and registered in accordance with his/her racial characteristics as part of the system of apartheid.
- The Group Areas Act 1950, which assigned racial groups to different residential and business sections in the white-dominated urban areas.
- The Pass Laws Act of 1952, which stipulated that all people of colour (above the age of 16) should carry a passbook at all times when outside their designated homelands.

== Uprising ==
On 7 November 1952, protestors took to town and demonstrated against apartheid and its laws by occupying racially segregated public spaces in Kimberley. Protestors then continued to block the whites-only entrance to the main post office and defiantly sat on whites-only benches at the Kimberley railway station. Dr Arthur Letele and seven other No. 2 Location executive ANC members namely Sam Phakedi, Pepys Madibane, Olehile Sehume, Alexander Nkoane, Daniel Chabalala and David Mpiwa were arrested. The arrests intensified further resentment and led to public uprisings in the streets of No. 2 Location which led to the destruction of both private and public property. The protests continued the following day, 8 November, with more arrests and property destruction as the police station, two nearby clinics, a power station and several other buildings including a crèche were burnt down. Many police, municipal and private vehicles were torched. Protestors intended to march towards the centre of town and threatened to burn the petrol depot in Cecil Suzman Road. However, before they could reach the depot, the police stopped the march by firing into the people

=== Casualties ===
13 people were killed and 78 others wounded. According to oral testimony and witnesses, some of those killed and injured were innocent bystanders. A mass funeral was held at the field next to the Methodist Church at the corners of Mzikinya, Rhabe and Sanduza Streets in Galeshewe. The deceased were all buried at the Kimberley West End Cemetery. Their graves were then declared provincial heritage sites.

== See also ==
- African National Congress
- Apartheid
- History of South Africa
- Pass laws
