= 2025–26 SAFA Second Division =

ABC Motsepe League
- Season: 2025–26
- Champions: Hope FC / Sea Point Swifts
- Promoted: Hope FC / Sea Point Swifts, NWU Soccer Institute

The 2025–26 SAFA Second Division (known as the ABC Motsepe League for sponsorship reasons) is the 28th season of the SAFA Second Division, the third tier for South African association football clubs, since its establishment in 1998. Due to the size of South Africa, the competition was split into nine divisions, one for each region. After the league stage of the regional competition is completed, the nine winning teams of each regional division will enter the playoffs.

The competition is administered by the South African Football Association.

Due the expulsion of Premiership team Royal AM, three teams were promoted from the previous season rather than the usual two. The start of the season was again affected by legal challenges following the decision to conclude the previous season's playoffs with only seven teams, after the exclusion of the Eastern Cape and Limpopo representatives.

== Eastern Cape ==
=== Eastern Cape Coastal Stream ===
Pos	Team	Pld	W	D	L	GF	GA	GD	Pts	Qualification or relegation
1	Old Grey	18	10	8	0	38	15	+23	38	Qualification for Eastern Cape final
2	Komani United	18	12	2	4	28	13	+15	38	
3	Gqeberha United	18	10	3	5	30	22	+8	33	
4	Buffalo City Relatives	18	9	2	7	34	25	+9	29	
5	Amavarara	18	7	3	8	21	23	−2	24	
6	Camdeboo Football Academy	18	7	3	8	26	29	−3	24	
7	Makana Rhini United	18	6	2	10	21	33	−12	20	
8	Sundays River Valley Academy	18	4	7	7	17	20	−3	19	
9	Seven Stars	18	4	4	10	22	31	−9	16	
10	Emi	18	2	4	12	11	37	−26	10	

Source: https://inqaku.com/leagues/view?season_id=15204&stream_id=23316

=== Eastern Cape Inland Stream ===
Pos	Team	Pld	W	D	L	GF	GA	GD	Pts	Qualification or relegation
1	FC Ravens	18	14	3	1	42	9	+33	45	Qualification for Eastern Cape final
2	SA Spear of the Nation	18	12	4	2	29	11	+18	40	
3	Bizana Pondo City	18	8	4	6	23	19	+4	28	
4	Matta Milan	18	7	7	4	14	12	+2	28	
5	Sinenkani	18	6	7	5	18	11	+7	25	
6	Bush Bucks	18	5	7	6	16	21	−5	22	
7	FC Battalion	18	4	4	10	17	32	−15	16	
8	Amaxesibe	18	4	4	10	13	28	−15	16	
9	Fast Eleven	18	4	3	11	11	27	−16	15	
10	Mighty Eagles	18	0	9	9	11	24	−13	9	Relegation to the Hollywoodbets Regional League

Source: https://inqaku.com/leagues/view?season_id=15204&stream_id=23315

=== Eastern Cape final ===
FC Ravens	1-0	Old Grey
	Report

== Free State ==
In March 2026, Mathaithai pulled out of the league, citing SAFA's failure to pay five years worth of grants, and lack of sponsorship.

Pos	Team	Pld	W	D	L	GF	GA	GD	Pts	Qualification or relegation
1	Mangaung Unite	33	25	7	1	75	20	+55	82	Qualification for Promotion play-offs
2	Mangaung City	33	19	9	5	57	30	+27	66	
3	Sasolburg United	33	19	8	6	47	30	+17	65	
4	Kovsies	33	17	7	9	61	37	+24	58	
5	Super Eagles	33	16	9	8	51	32	+19	57	
6	African Warriors	33	15	7	11	44	46	−2	52	
7	Kamele FC	33	15	5	13	52	39	+13	50	
8	Tower United	33	13	10	10	57	53	+4	49	
9	Welkom Real Stars	33	10	12	11	51	52	−1	42	
10	Sibanye Stillwater	33	12	5	16	47	54	−7	41	
11	Motsomotle	33	9	11	13	46	50	−4	38	
12	Free State United	32	10	7	15	47	55	−8	37	
13	Central University	33	9	7	17	44	61	−17	34	
14	Remember Elite Soccer Academy	33	7	10	16	39	60	−21	31	
15	Bloemfontein Young Tigers	32	7	6	19	45	71	−26	27	
16	Mathathai	17	6	4	7	18	21	−3	22	
17	Brave Eleven	33	4	10	19	36	59	−23	22	Relegation to the SAFA Regional League
18	Mountain Eagles	33	4	8	21	28	75	−47	20	Relegation to the SAFA Regional League

Source: https://inqaku.com/leagues/view?season_id=15203&stream_id=-1

== Gauteng ==
Pos	Team	Pld	W	D	L	GF	GA	GD	Pts	Qualification or relegation
1	La Masia	34	20	9	5	47	23	+24	69	Qualification for Promotion play-offs
2	Free Agents	34	19	11	4	48	17	+31	68	
3	Tembisa Hollywood Thunder	34	16	13	5	36	22	+14	61	
4	Dinoko City	34	16	12	6	51	34	+17	60	
5	Mabopane JM	34	17	6	11	45	30	+15	57	
6	Rrr Rams	34	18	6	10	51	40	+11	60	
7	Orlando Pirates B	34	16	7	11	52	33	+19	55	
8	Soweto Super United M-17	34	15	10	9	54	36	+18	55	
9	University of Johannesburg	34	14	7	13	39	34	+5	49	
10	Young Pirates	34	13	7	14	41	45	−4	46	
11	JBM	34	10	10	14	37	43	−6	40	
12	Wits University	34	11	7	16	36	46	−10	40	
13	Jomo Cosmos	34	9	12	13	38	51	−13	39	
14	Tshwane University of Technology	34	9	9	16	35	49	−14	36	
15	Mike-1-Stars	34	9	7	18	36	56	−20	34	
16	Tshwane South College	34	9	6	19	44	54	−10	33	
17	Dube Continental	34	7	10	17	43	56	−13	31	Relegation to Hollywoodbets Regional League
18	Leruma United	34	1	5	28	15	79	−64	8	Relegation to Hollywoodbets Regional League

Source: https://inqaku.com/leagues/view?season_id=15254&stream_id=23918
Rules for classification: 1) points; 2) head-to-head points; 3) head-to-head goal difference; 4) head-to-head goals scored; 5) goal difference; 6) goals scored; 7) playoff.

== KwaZulu-Natal ==
=== KwaZulu-Natal Stream A ===
Pos	Team	Pld	W	D	L	GF	GA	GD	Pts	Qualification or relegation
1	Umvoti	22	19	2	1	43	9	+34	59	Qualification for KwaZulu-Natal final
2	Njampela	22	18	2	2	43	13	+30	56	
3	Summerfield Dynamos	22	11	7	4	30	15	+15	40	
4	Ulundi United	22	11	7	4	28	17	+11	40	
5	Tornado	22	8	7	7	30	24	+6	31	
6	Umlazi Young Lions	22	7	7	8	24	23	+1	28	
7	Asande	22	8	4	10	21	24	−3	28	
8	Durban Pioneers	22	6	4	12	22	32	−10	22	
9	Hellenic	22	6	3	13	22	36	−14	21	
10	Good Fellas	22	6	2	14	27	43	−16	20	
11	University of KwaZulu-Natal	22	5	1	16	21	48	−27	16	
12	Umzinto United	22	3	2	17	22	49	−27	11	Relegation to the SAFA Regional League

Source: https://inqaku.com/leagues/view?season_id=15255&stream_id=23904

=== KwaZulu-Natal Stream B ===
Pos	Team	Pld	W	D	L	GF	GA	GD	Pts	Qualification or relegation
1	Mkhambathi	22	17	4	1	42	7	+35	55	Qualification for KwaZulu-Natal final]
2	Msinga United	22	16	5	1	43	9	+34	53	
3	Umshwathi United	22	11	7	4	24	13	+11	40	
4	Chess	22	11	5	6	22	13	+9	38	
5	Falcons	22	10	6	6	28	19	+9	36	
6	KwaMashu Durban Knights	22	8	6	8	23	27	−4	30	
7	Umgungundlovu United	22	7	8	7	19	17	+2	29	
8	Ethekwini Coastal	22	7	1	14	17	43	−26	22	
9	Ditlou	22	3	7	12	17	30	−13	16	
10	Newcastle All Stars	22	3	5	14	14	31	−17	14	
11	Newcastle Warriors	22	2	8	12	15	34	−19	14	
12	Drakensberg	22	2	8	12	11	32	−21	14	

Source: https://inqaku.com/leagues/view?season_id=15255&stream_id=23905

=== KwaZulu-Natal final ===
Umvoti	0–1	Mkhambathi

== Limpopo ==
In March, the game between Ngwaabe City Motors and Eleven Fast Tiger was abandoned after a penalty was awarded to Ngwaabe. Tigers felt that the decision was unfair, and that they had had two clear penalties denied, and left the pitch in protest.

=== Limpopo Stream A ===
Pos	Team	Pld	W	D	L	GF	GA	GD	Pts	Qualification or relegation
1	Mpheni Home Defenders	22	14	6	2	43	14	+29	48	Qualification for Limpopo final
2	Tzaneen United	22	13	4	5	40	26	+14	43	
3	The Dolphins	22	12	6	4	29	19	+10	42	
4	Mukondeni Young Chiefs	22	9	9	4	27	21	+6	36	
5	White Vultures	22	8	9	5	34	28	+6	33	
6	Musina United	22	7	7	8	24	28	−4	28	
7	Vondwe XI Bullets	22	8	4	10	17	23	−6	28	
8	Phalaborwa United	22	6	7	9	21	23	−2	25	
9	Nkowankowa Continental	22	6	4	12	25	35	−10	22	
10	Baduzah Celtics	22	4	9	9	22	28	−6	21	
11	Tshakhuma Tsha Madzivhandila	21	3	7	11	18	36	−18	16	
12	Lebash Football Academy	21	3	4	14	22	41	−19	13	Relegation to the SAFA Regional League

Updated to match(es) played on 13 May 2026. Source: https://inqaku.com/leagues/view?season_id=15205&stream_id=23326

=== Limpopo Stream B ===
Pos	Team	Pld	W	D	L	GF	GA	GD	Pts	Qualification or relegation
1	City Motors	22	12	6	4	30	10	+20	42	Qualification for Limpopo final
2	Makotopong Bahumi	22	11	6	5	33	21	+12	39	
3	Mohlabile United	22	9	9	4	24	22	+2	36	
4	Mighty	22	10	6	6	33	33	0	36	
5	Ramatlaohle Mogalakwena United	22	9	7	6	29	26	+3	34	
6	Mokopane Pj Stars United	22	8	5	9	25	27	−2	29	
7	Eleven Fast Tigers	22	7	7	8	26	26	0	28	
8	Royal Pirates	22	8	3	11	30	31	−1	27	
9	Ditlou	22	5	11	6	19	20	−1	26	
10	Tubatse United	21	7	5	9	21	27	−6	26	
11	Gosebe United	22	6	5	11	30	34	−4	23	
12	University of Limpopo Academy	21	1	6	14	16	39	−23	9	Relegation to the SAFA Regional League

Updated to match(es) played on 13 May 2026. Source: https://inqaku.com/leagues/view?season_id=15205&stream_id=23327

=== Limpopo final ===
16 May 2026	Mpheni Home Defenders	1–0	City Motors	Seshego Stadium, Seshego

== Mpumalanga ==
=== Mpumalanga Stream A ===
Pos	Team	Pld	W	D	L	GF	GA	GD	Pts	Qualification or relegation
1	Phezulu	22	20	2	0	67	12	+55	62	Qualification for Mpumalanga final
2	Middelburg United	22	13	6	3	39	16	+23	45	
3	Shimadel	22	12	6	4	36	17	+19	42	
4	Secunda M Stars	22	11	8	3	29	18	+11	41	
5	Home Culture Express	22	9	7	6	28	18	+10	34	
6	Carolina Young Boys	22	9	6	7	23	16	+7	33	
7	KwaNdebele United	21	6	5	10	22	39	−17	23	
8	Witbank City Lads	21	5	7	9	18	24	−6	22	
9	Amsterdam United	22	5	5	12	14	36	−22	20	
10	Home Defenders	22	4	5	13	20	46	−26	17	
11	Machidi Lion Brothers	22	3	5	14	19	35	−16	14	
12	Tiger Boys	22	1	4	17	11	49	−38	7	

Source: https://inqaku.com/leagues/view?season_id=15236&stream_id=23576
Rules for classification: 1) points; 2) head-to-head points; 3) head-to-head goal difference; 4) head-to-head goals scored; 5) goal difference; 6) goals scored; 7) playoff.

=== Mpumalanga Stream B ===
Pos	Team	Pld	W	D	L	GF	GA	GD	Pts	Qualification or relegation
1	Luthuli Brigades	18	13	3	2	31	9	+22	42	Qualification for Mpumalanga final
2	Fernie Battalion	18	11	4	3	29	8	+21	37	
3	KaMhlushwa Real Madrid	18	11	4	3	25	11	+14	37	
4	Liver Brothers	18	7	6	5	18	16	+2	27	
5	Junior Callies	18	4	8	6	15	19	−4	20	
6	Makhonjwa All Stars	18	4	7	7	16	21	−5	19	
7	Dankie Son	18	4	6	8	14	28	−14	18	
8	Zebras	18	3	7	8	15	23	−8	16	
9	Sibange Young Bucks	18	2	8	8	10	19	−9	14	
10	Acornhoek United	18	2	5	11	12	31	−19	11	Relegation to Hollywoodbets Regional League

Rules for classification: 1) points; 2) head-to-head points; 3) head-to-head goal difference; 4) head-to-head goals scored; 5) goal difference; 6) goals scored; 7) playoff.

=== Mpumalanga final ===
Phezulu	v	Luthuli Brigades

== Northern Cape ==
=== Northern Cape Stream A ===
Pos	Team	Pld	W	D	L	GF	GA	GD	Pts	Qualification or relegation
1	NC Professionals	8	6	1	1	26	6	+20	19	Qualification for Northern Cape final
2	Amalawus	7	6	0	1	15	6	+9	18	
3	Kakamas Juventus	6	5	0	1	16	5	+11	15	
4	Benfica	9	5	0	4	12	12	0	15	
5	Rasta Far Eagles	9	5	0	4	11	12	−1	15	
6	Olympics	8	3	3	2	18	14	+4	12	
7	Kakamas United	7	3	1	3	12	11	+1	10	
8	Upington Tornado	6	3	1	2	10	10	0	10	
9	Tsantsabane Stars	8	2	2	4	9	11	−2	8	
10	Kakamas Sundowns	8	2	1	5	7	16	−9	7	
11	Postmasburg	7	1	0	6	3	17	−14	3	
12	Young Ones	9	0	1	8	11	30	−19	1	

Updated to match(es) played on 10 December 2025. Source: https://inqaku.com/leagues/view?season_id=15232&stream_id=-1

=== Northern Cape Stream B ===
Pos	Team	Pld	W	D	L	GF	GA	GD	Pts	Qualification or relegation
1	Gaza United	17	12	3	2	33	13	+20	39	Qualification for Northern Cape final
2	Pearls United	17	10	5	2	22	10	+12	35	
3	Jacksa Spears	13	9	1	3	35	15	+20	28	
4	United Rovers	18	7	4	7	33	32	+1	25	
5	Mighty Moovers	16	7	3	6	32	34	−2	24	
6	G Stasie	14	6	4	4	25	18	+7	22	
7	Mighty Reds	18	6	3	9	31	28	+3	21	
8	SPU	16	6	1	9	27	29	−2	19	
9	Ocean Swallows	16	5	3	8	25	42	−17	18	
10	Blues	17	4	4	9	20	34	−14	16	
11	Destiny United	14	3	4	7	19	30	−11	13	Relegation to the SAFA Regional League
12	Kimberley Saints	14	2	1	11	10	27	−17	7	Relegation to the SAFA Regional League

Updated to match(es) played on 2 March 2026. Source: https://inqaku.com/leagues/view?season_id=15232&stream_id=24252

=== Northern Cape final ===
NC Professionals	1–1 (4–3 p)	Jacksa Spears

== North West ==
=== North West Stream A ===
Pos	Team	Pld	W	D	L	GF	GA	GD	Pts	Qualification or relegation
1	Army Rockets FC	21	15	4	2	50	11	+39	49	North West final
2	Kgositlile FC	21	12	5	4	40	26	+14	41	
3	Lerumo Lions	21	11	7	3	32	23	+9	40	
4	Cheeky Boys	21	11	6	4	36	21	+15	39	
5	Thaba Tshwane	20	9	6	5	34	20	+14	33	
6	Platinum City Rovers	20	9	4	7	24	21	+3	31	
7	NW Signal	21	8	7	6	27	25	+2	31	
8	Spain FC	21	5	8	8	27	20	+7	23	
9	NWU Tawana FC	21	4	7	10	16	30	−14	19	
10	Bokone NW FC	20	4	3	13	15	28	−13	15	
11	Jack All Stars	21	3	2	16	17	50	−33	11	
12	Lethabong United	20	3	1	16	13	56	−43	10	Relegation to Hollywoodbets Regional League

Updated to match(es) played on 28 May 2026. Source: https://inqaku.com/leagues/view?season_id=15235&stream_id=23671

=== North West Stream B ===
Pos	Team	Pld	W	D	L	GF	GA	GD	Pts	Qualification or relegation
1	Thames	5	4	1	0	11	1	+10	13	North West final
2	Stilfontein Real Hearts	5	3	2	0	6	3	+3	11	
3	North West University	4	3	1	0	10	1	+9	10	
4	Gm5 United	5	3	0	2	10	5	+5	9	
5	Real Movers	5	3	0	2	11	9	+2	9	
6	Milan	4	2	1	1	6	6	0	7	
7	Belligerators	5	2	0	3	6	12	−6	6	
8	Montshioa Swallows	5	1	2	2	3	5	−2	5	
9	Nkamodira	5	1	1	3	5	7	−2	4	
10	Homeboys United	4	1	0	3	5	10	−5	3	
11	Indomitable Lions	5	1	0	4	5	10	−5	3	
12	Mahika Champions	4	0	0	4	0	9	−9	0	Relegation to Hollywoodbets Regional League

Updated to match(es) played on 11 November 2025. Source: https://inqaku.com/leagues/view?season_id=15235&stream_id=23672

=== North West final ===
North West University Soccer Institute	1–0	Army Rockets	Potchefstroom
			Stadium: Fanie Du Toit Sportsground

== Western Cape ==
Prior to the start of the season, in November 2025, Santos were expelled from the league. This came after SAFA had excluded Santos from the Nedbank Cup over outstanding financial obligations. Santos had taken the matter to court, and SAFA were interdicted from going ahead with the Nedbank Cup fixture without Santos, and the matter referred to arbitration. SAFA then expelled Santos from the league. Santos appealed and won, and were reinstated in the league, expanding it to 25 teams.

During the campaign, Sea Point Swifts were renamed Hope FC.

=== Western Cape Stream A ===
Pos	Team	Pld	W	D	L	GF	GA	GD	Pts	Qualification or relegation
1	Seapoint Swifts / Hope FC	24	16	5	3	43	17	+26	53	Qualification for Western Cape final
2	Hanover Park	24	14	6	4	37	27	+10	48	
3	Cape Town Spurs	24	13	4	7	36	25	+11	43	
4	Hout Bay United	24	13	3	8	40	18	+22	42	
5	FN Rangers	24	12	5	7	37	27	+10	41	
6	Santos	24	10	7	7	35	32	+3	37	
7	Vasco da Gama	24	9	7	8	34	25	+9	34	
8	Seaside Spurs	24	9	4	11	33	42	−9	31	
9	Ubuntu	24	7	5	12	33	41	−8	26	
10	Zizwe United/Ikapa Sporting	24	8	1	15	21	31	−10	25	
11	Young Bafana	24	6	7	11	25	35	−10	25	
12	Inter City	24	6	5	13	20	31	−11	23	
13	Junction Rovers	24	2	3	19	20	61	−41	9	

Source: https://inqaku.com/leagues/view?season_id=15233&stream_id=24233

=== Western Cape Stream B ===
Pos	Team	Pld	W	D	L	GF	GA	GD	Pts	Qualification or relegation
1	Diadora	22	14	5	3	60	28	+32	47	Qualification for Western Cape final
2	Ammar Soccer Academy	22	13	4	5	54	21	+33	43	
3	Grassy Park United	22	12	5	5	43	17	+26	41	
4	Royal Blues	22	11	6	5	34	27	+7	39	
5	Maties F.C.	22	10	5	7	22	17	+5	35	
6	Barcelona	22	9	6	7	33	36	−3	33	
7	Ubuntu Spartans	22	10	3	9	36	40	−4	33	
8	Batalions FC	22	9	4	9	34	34	0	31	
9	Nanini Na All Stars	22	9	2	11	31	42	−11	29	
10	Mbekweni Cosmos	22	5	4	13	19	32	−13	19	
11	Bayhill United	22	3	4	15	18	42	−24	13	
12	Hillside	22	2	2	18	17	65	−48	8	

Source: https://inqaku.com/leagues/view?season_id=15233&stream_id=24234

=== Western Cape final ===
Hope FC	1–0	Diadora

== Promotion play-offs ==
=== Group A ===
- NWU Soccer Institute (North West)
- La Masia (Gauteng)
- Luthuli Brigades (Mpumalanga)

==== Results ====
2 June 2026	Luthuli Brigades	0–0	NWU Soccer Institute	Mthatha Stadium, Mthatha

3 June 2026	Luthuli Brigades	2–1	La Masia	Mthatha Stadium, Mthatha

4 June 2026	La Masia	2–3	NWU Soccer Institute	Mthatha Stadium, Mthatha

=== Group B ===
- Hope FC / Sea Point Swifts (Western Cape)
- FC Ravens (Eastern Cape)
- Mangaung Unite (Free State)

==== Results ====
2 June 2026	Hope FC / Sea Point Swifts	3–1	FC Ravens	Mthatha Stadium, Mthatha

3 June 2026	FC Ravens	2–1	Mangaung Unite	Mthatha Stadium, Mthatha

4 June 2026	Mangaung Unite	1–1	Hope FC / Sea Point Swifts	Mthatha Stadium, Mthatha

=== Group C ===
- NC Professionals (Northern Cape)
- Mpheni Defenders (Limpopo)
- Mkhambathi FC (KwaZulu-Natal)

==== Results ====
2 June 2026	NC Professionals	2–0	Mpheni Defenders	Mthatha Stadium, Mthatha

3 June 2026	Mpheni Defenders	0–2	Mkhambathi FC	Mthatha Stadium, Mthatha

4 June 2026	Mkhambathi FC	0–0	NC Professionals	Mthatha Stadium, Mthatha

=== Semi-finals ===
6 June 2026	Mkhambathi FC	1–2	NWU Soccer Institute	Mthatha Stadium, Mthatha
11:00 SAST

6 June 2026	NC Professionals	1–4	Hope FC / Sea Point Swifts	Mthatha Stadium, Mthatha
15:00 SAST

=== Final ===
7 June 2026	Hope FC / Sea Point Swifts	1–1 (5–3 p)	NWU Soccer Institute	Mthatha Stadium, Mthatha
15:00 SAST
