= Pirates Cup =

Soccer Tournament

- Organiser(s): Orlando Pirates F.C.
- Founded: 2016; 10 years ago
- Region: South Africa
- Teams: 54
- Current champions: FC Leapers (1st title)
- Most championships: Orlando Pirates U/21 (3 titles)
- Website: www.orlandopiratesfc.com
- 2026

The Pirates Cup is an U/21 soccer tournament hosted annually by Orlando Pirates.

The current champions are FC Leapers who defeated TS Galaxy 4-3 via penalties in the final.

== History ==
The inaugural edition was founded in 2016. Orlando Pirates won the first three editions of the tournament.

In 2019, the tournament started allowing U/21 teams from the PSL and the NFD to participate and increased the numbers of teams from 24 to 32 teams. Orlando Pirates were defeated 1-0 in the final by SuperSport United making Matsatsantsa the first team other than the Buccaneers to win the tournament.

== Champions ==
Year	Champions	Runners-up
2016	Orlando Pirates	
2017	Orlando Pirates	
2018	Orlando Pirates	
2019	SuperSport United	Orlando Pirates
2020	Cancelled due to the COVID-19 pandemic in South Africa	
2021	Cancelled due to the COVID-19 pandemic in South Africa	
2022	Ambassadors FC	Bosso 90
2023	Stars of Africa Football Academy	Orbit College
2024	University of Johannesburg	Teltonika Amahle
2025	Lerumo Lions	Orlando Pirates
2026	FC Leapers	TS Galaxy

== Project X ==
The best players at the tournament get to feature in the Project X team. Project X, is a developmental team formed by Orlando Pirates to develop its future stars and expose them to the highest level of football. The team has a yearly tour in which they play matches against some best academies.

The 2017 and 2019 Project X tours saw the team jet out to England. In 2018, they toured Brazil.

== Awards ==
The following players were rated best:

Year	Golden Boot	Team	MVP	Team	Golden Glove	Team
2016						
2017						
2018						
2019	Rodi Sibanda (12 goals)	Orlando Pirates	Reagan Appollis	SuperSport United	not awarded	
2020	Cancelled due to the COVID-19 pandemic in South Africa					
2021	Cancelled due to the COVID-19 pandemic in South Africa					
2022	Mehluleli Maphumulo	Ambassadors	Relebogile Ratomo	Transnet School of Excellence	not awarded	
2023	Lungile Mokoena	Amahle	Siyabulela Mabele	Orbit College	not awarded	
2024	Thokozani Sibanyoni	eMalahleni United	Mpendulo Phewa	Midlands Academy	Lungelo Sithole	University of Johannesburg
2025	Alfred Kwanele	eMalahleni United	Lucky Malatsi	Lerumo Lions	not awarded	
2026	Promise Phephenyan (5 goals)	Lambani Football Academy	Moeketsi Koalepe	FC Leapers	Moeketsi Koalepe	FC Leapers

== Sponsor ==
The tournament is sponsored by:

- Orlando Pirates (host)
- Vodacom
- adidas
- aQuelle
- Oppo
- Marriott Bonvoy
