= University of Johannesburg F.C. =

UJ F.C.
- Full name: University of Johannesburg Football Club
- Nickname: OrangeArmy
- Ground: UJ Soweto Stadium
- Capacity: 900
- Coordinates: 26.1785° S, 27.9908° E
- Manager: (South Africa) Thapelo Pule
- League: SAFA Second Division
- 2025–26: 9th
- Website: uj-fc.co.za
Home colours

The University of Johannesburg F.C., also knowns as UJ F.C., is the football club representing the University of Johannesburg based in Johannesburg, Gauteng. The senior team competes in the SAFA Second Division, the third tier men's football league in South Africa.

In 2024 they won their maiden Pirates Cup going undefeated in all 11 matches in the tournament.

== History ==
In June 2023 they were promoted to the SAFA Second Division after winning the SAFA Johannesburg Regional League Blue Stream which qualified them for the Gauteng SAFA Second Division provincial playoffs.

== U/21 ==
In March 2024, they won the Pirates Cup. They defeated Teltonika Amahle 2-1 in the final to win the U/21 tournament hosted by Orlando Pirates.

== League record ==
=== SAFA Second Division Gauteng Division ===
- 2023–24 – 11th of 18
- 2024–25 – 8th of 18
- 2025–26 – 9th of 18

== Honours ==
SAFA Johannesburg Regional League Blue Stream: 2022/23
