= Bellville Stadium =

Multi-use stadium in Bellville, South Africa

- Interactive map of Bellville Stadium
- Location: Bellville, Western Cape, South Africa
- Coordinates: 33°52′52.42″S 18°37′59.41″E
- Owner: City of Cape Town
- Surface: Grass

Construction
- Opened: March 1992

Tenant
- Vasco Da Gama

Bellville Stadium is a multi-use stadium in Bellville, South Africa. It is currently used mostly for football matches and is the home stadium of Vasco Da Gama.

It has two artificial turfs. The Western Province rugby team also known as #Stormers for franchise purposes sometimes trains here.
