= Ephraim Mohale Stadium =

Multi-use stadium in Modimolle, Limpopo, South Africa

- Interactive map of Ephraim Mohale Stadium
- Location: Modimolle, Limpopo
- Coordinates: 24.69724°S 28.44266°E

Ephraim Mohale Stadium is a multi-use stadium in Modimolle, Limpopo, South Africa. It is currently used mostly for football matches and is the home venue of Modimolle Aces in the SAFA Second Division.
