= Flavius Mareka Sports Ground =

Multi-use stadium in Sasolburg, Free State, South Africa

- Interactive map of Flavius Mareka Sports Ground
- Location: Sasolburg, Free State
- Coordinates: 26.8164°S 27.8400°E

Flavius Mareka Sports Grounds is a multi-use stadium in Sasolburg, Free State, South Africa. It is currently used mostly for football matches and is the home ground of Manco Milano F.C.
