= William Herbert Sports Ground =

Cricket ground

Coordinates: 34.0103123759037°S 18.481774696794083°E

- Location: Wynberg, Cape Town, Western Cape, South Africa
- Establishment: 1879
- Last used: 2010
- As of 17 December 2023; Source: ESPNcricinfo

William Herbert Sports Ground is a cricket ground in Wynberg, Cape Town, a region of Western Cape province in South Africa. The ground was first used in 1879. It hosted two first-class matches of the Dadabhay Trophy from 1972 to 1974. It also hosted matches of the Dadabhay Trophy, prior to getting first-class status, between 1958 and 1968. The first recorded match having official status on the ground was held on 1 January 1972, between Western Province and Natal.
