= George Thabe Stadium =

Multi-purpose stadium in Sharpeville, Gauteng, South Africa

- Interactive map of George Thabe Stadium
- Location: Sharpeville, Gauteng
- Coordinates: 26.68769°S 27.86610°E

George Thabe Stadium is a multi-use stadium in Sharpeville, Gauteng, South Africa. It is currently used mostly for football matches and is the home venue of Real Barcelona F.C. in the SAFA Second Division.
