= Galeshewe Stadium =

Multi-use stadium in Kimberley, South Africa

- Interactive map of Galeshewe Stadium
- Former names: King George Sports Ground
- Location: Phakedi Street, Galeshewe, Kimberley, Northern Cape, South Africa
- Coordinates: 28.716786°S 24.740857°E
- Capacity: N/A

Tenants
- Real Madrid and Steach United

Galeshewe Stadium, formerly known as King George Sports Ground, is a multi-use stadium in the Galeshewe suburb of Kimberley, in the Northern Cape province of South Africa. It is currently used mostly for soccer matches, and has been the home ground of two football clubs, Real Madrid, and Steach United.

== Corruption ==
In 2018, the National Lottery awarded a company, Inqaba Yokulinda, R15 million, of which R10 million was earmarked for upgrading the Galeshewe Stadium athletics track. The company director was pressured to sub-contract this to an IT company with no track record of building infrastructure, who failed to deliver any of the project. The lottery awarded a further R4.7 million in September 2019, and the upgrade was completed by February 2020, as well as renovating and painting the stadium, renovating the change rooms and fixing broken and leaking taps and toilets.
