= Kwezi Naledi Stadium =

Multi-use stadium in Lady Grey, Eastern Cape, South Africa

- Location: Lady Grey, Eastern Cape

Kwezi Naledi Stadium is a multi-use stadium in Lady Grey, Eastern Cape, South Africa. It is currently used mostly for football matches and is the home ground of EMI F.C.
