= Galeshewe =

Township in Kimberley, South Africa

Galeshewe is a township in Kimberley, South Africa. Within the Sol Plaatje Local Municipality in the Northern Cape Province, it is named after Kgosi Galeshewe.

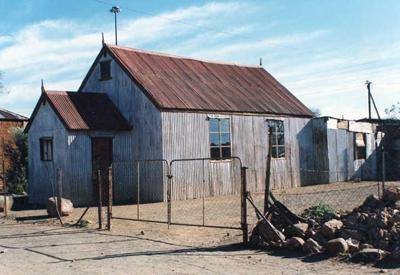
Greater No 2, Galeshewe township

== History ==
The township of Galeshewe was founded in 1878 after diamonds were discovered at kopje (hill) near Colesberg in 1871. The diamond rush which followed the discovery of diamonds saw an influx of people from all over, seeking fortune in the sprawling town of Kimberley. In 1873 Kimberley's population had grown to 40,000. The first parts of Galeshewe sprung up in the early 1870s to accommodate the migrant labour population in Kimberley. In 1886, the first large compounds for workers known as the Greater No 2 were introduced at the De Beers Mine. Galeshewe started to grow west from the Greater No 2 in the 1930s. The central part of the present Galeshewe was built between 1950s and 1970s.

In 1952 the Native Advisory Committee of Kimberley approved a recommendation from residents to name the township Galeshewe after Kgosi (Chief) Galeshewe of the Batlhaping tribe. On 1 August 1973, the Kimberley Council granted control of Galeshewe township to the Bantu Administration Board of the Diamond Fields. A May 5, 1976 edition of the Kimberley newspaper "The Diamond Fields Advertiser" reported that “slums” in the township were a problem with at least 9 or 10 people living in a four-roomed house. This was due to a lack of suitable housing and high unemployment. On 2 January 1978, the Community Board took over the control of the township.

Galeshewe Municipality was inaugurated on 30 November 1983 making the township the first Black-controlled municipality in South Africa. According to a report by the Galeshewe town council, the population of the township was 81202, and made up of 10110 families. There were 10327 residential sites, of which 9525 were still being developed. The township had 10 creche sites, 68 parks, 71 business sites (64 developed), 54 church sites (12 developed) and 30 school sites. In 1988 there were several new suburbs making up Greater Galeshewe. No 2 was still there, but there was also Ikageng (Redirile, and referred to as Stocks and Stocks), Ikageleng, Retswele, KwaNobantu, Zone Six (Extension Six), Ipeleng, and Vergenoeg. In 1994, after the election of South Africa's first democratic government, Galeshewe became part of the Sol Plaatje Local Municipality.

== Mayibuye Uprising ==
On 7 November 1952, Greater No 2, Galeshewe ANC, leader Dr Arthur Letele organised a group of volunteers to defy the segregation laws by sitting on the 'Europeans Only' benches at the Kimberley Station in support of the ANC's Defiance Campaign. They were arrested and fined £3 or 10 days imprisonment. They all opted for the latter. A day later on 8 November, a group of men shouted political slogans, giving the Defiance Campaign salute and were ordered out of the Municipal African Beer Hall in No. 2 Location, Galeshewe because they were doing the salutes in the beer hall. This led to a riot and the destruction of six buildings in the township, including the police station, two nearby clinics, a power station and a crèche. Kimberley police fired at the rioters as they approached the city centre. Thirteen people were killed and 78 others wounded. At dawn the following morning the police detained Dr Arthur Letele, Sam Phakedi, Pepys Madibane, Olehile Sehume, Alexander Nkoane, Daniel Chabalala and David Mpiwa, who were regarded as the ringleaders. On 12 November 1952, a mass funeral was held at the field next to the Methodist Church at the corners of Mzikinya, Rhabe and Sanduza Streets in Galeshewe. The deceased were all buried at the Kimberley West End Cemetery. The uprising and massacre came to be known as the Mayibuye Uprising. In November 2002, a sculpture of a clenched fist with a raised thumb was unveiled in Galeshewe in honour of the Mayibuye Uprising.

== Galeshewe Now ==
According to Census 2011, Galeshewe has a population of 107, 920 people, half of Sol Plaatje Local Municipality. 92.2 of the township's population is Black African, 7.28% is Coloured, 0.22% Indian Asian, 0.07% White and 0.30% is identified as "other". 56,8% of the population speaks Setswana with Afrikaans being the second-most spoken language at 24,9%. Out of the 25,429 households in Galeshewe, 54,6% have access to clean drinking water and 78,1% have electricity for lighting. The Sol Plaatje Local Municipality: Integrated Development Plan - IDP (2017 – 2022), which also includes Galeshewe, states that 31.9% of the population in the area is unemployed. The youth make up 41.7% of the unemployed population in the municipality. 14,8% of the households in the township do not have a source of income while 20,4% (highest percentage) has an income between R19,601 and R38,200. The township's formal housing sits at 74,3%.

There are three main health facilities in Galeshewe; the Galeshewe Day Hospital, MaDoyle Clinic and the Galeshewe Clinic. The township has a central police station known as the Galeshewe Police Station. The key points for sports and entertainment in the township are Galeshewe Stadium and the Galeshewe Open Air Arena.

== Notable people from Galeshewe ==
- Robert Sobukwe
- Ronnie Joel
- Manne Dipico
- Dipuo Peters
- Jimmy Tau
- Connie Ferguson
- Richard Henyekane
- Thebe Magugu
- Gail Nkoane Mabalane
