= Jan Smuts Stadium =

Building in Africa

- Interactive map of Jan Smuts Stadium
- Location: Arcadia, East London
- Coordinates: 33.007°S 27.905°E

Tenants
- FC Buffalo, Bush Bucks, OR Tambo DC, Tornado

The Jan Smuts Stadium is an athletics and football stadium in the Arcadia suburb of East London, Buffalo City. The stadium is named in honour of Jan Smuts, and is adjacent to the Buffalo City Stadium.

== Football related tenants ==
During the 2009–10 football season, it was named as Blackburn Rovers FC's home venue, competing at the Eastern Cape province of Vodacom League. When the team after the season won promotion for National First Division, they however moved their home venue to the adjacent Buffalo City Stadium. In the 2010–11 season, no less than 4 other teams from Vodacom League (FC Buffalo, Bush Bucks, OR Tambo DC, Tornado), picked the Jan Smuts Stadium as their preferred home venue.
