= AJ Swanepoel Stadium =

Multi-sports stadium in Ermelo, Mpumalanga, South Africa

- Interactive map of AJ Swanepoel Stadium
- Location: Ermelo, Mpumalanga
- Coordinates: 26.517803°S 29.998670°E

AJ Swanepoel Stadium is a multi-sports stadium in Ermelo, Mpumalanga, South Africa.

It is the home venue of Vodacom League football teams Mologadi FC and Sekhukhune Lions.
