= Ulundi Stadium =

Multi-use stadium in Ulundi, KwaZulu-Natal, South Africa

Prince Mangosuthu Stadium
- Interactive map of Prince Mangosuthu Stadium
- Former names: Ulundi Stadium
- Location: Ulundi, South Africa
- Coordinates: 28°17′53″S 31°25′59″E
- Owner: Ulundi Municipality
- Capacity: 8,000
- Surface: Grass

Construction
- Groundbreaking: 1991
- Built: 1992
- Opened: 1993
- Renovated: 2009

Prince Mangosuthu Stadium, previously called the Ulundi Stadium, is a multi-use stadium in Ulundi, KwaZulu-Natal, South Africa. It is currently used mostly for soccer matches, and hosts the annual Prince Mangosuthu Legacy Cup.

The stadium has an athletics track, which as of 2025, had fallen into disrepair.

It also hosted the Mangosuthu Buthelezi memorial service.
