= Bohlokong Stadium =

Multi-use stadium in Bohlokong, Free State, South Africa

- Interactive map of Bohlokong Stadium
- Location: Bohlokong, Free State
- Coordinates: 28.21931°S 28.31647°E
- Capacity: 10 000

Tenant
- Super Eagles F.C

Bohlokong Stadium is a multi-use stadium in Bohlokong, Free State, South Africa. It is currently used mostly for football matches and is the home ground of Super Eagles F.C.
