= Platberg Stadium =

Sport stadium in Harrismith, Free State, South Africa

Coordinates: 28°16′26″S 29°08′16″E

- Interactive map of Platberg Stadium
- Location: Harrismith, Free State

Platberg Stadium is a multi-use stadium situated in Harrismith, Free State, South Africa. It is currently used mostly for football matches and is the home ground of Maluti Fet College. It is accessed via Greyling Street.
