= Wadley Stadium =

Football stadium in Edendale, South Africa

- Interactive map of Wadley Stadium
- Full name: First National Bank Wadley Stadium
- Location: Edendale, South Africa
- Coordinates: 29.646362°S 30.294081°E

Construction
- Built: 2008

Wadley Stadium (known as FNB Wadley Stadium for sponsorship reasons) is an association football stadium located in the township of Georgetown, Edendale near Pietermaritzburg.

It is home to Vodacom League side Maritzburg City F.C..
