= Hope F.C. =

Football club in the South African National First Division

Hope FC
- League: National First Division
- SAFA Second Division: 1st
- Website: www.facebook.com/Hopefcza/

Hope FC is a South African soccer club, based in Erica Park, Belhar, Western Cape, that plays in the National First Division.

== History ==
Initially affiliated with Sea Point Swifts and playing under that name, Hope FC won the Western Cape Stream of the 2025–26 SAFA Second Division, before winning the national playoffs to earn promotion to the 2026–27 National First Division.

== Honours ==
- SAFA Second Division winners: 2026–27
- SAFA Second Division Western Cape Stream winners: 2026–27

== League record ==
=== SAFA Second Division Western Cape Stream ===
- 2025–26 – 1st
