= Cecil Payne Stadium =

Building in Africa

- Interactive map of Cecil Payne Stadium
- Location: Roodepoort, Gauteng, South Africa
- Coordinates: 26°10′54″S 27°55′50″E
- Owner: City of Johannesburg

Cecil Payne Stadium is a multi-purpose stadium located in Roodepoort, a suburb of Johannesburg, South Africa. It is used mostly for football matches and was utilized as a training field for teams participating in the 2010 FIFA World Cup after being brought up to FIFA standards.
