= Sauer Park =

Multi-use stadium in Aliwal North, South Africa

- Former names: George Montgomery Stadium
- Location: Aliwal North, Eastern Cape
- Owner: Walter Sisulu Local Municipality

Sauer Park is a multi-use stadium in Aliwal North, Eastern Cape, South Africa. It is currently used mostly for football matches and served as the home ground of Young Stars when they were competing in the Vodacom League (ABC Motsepe League).

Recent renovations to the stadium include the addition of an athletics tracks as well as the replacement of old seats on the grand stand.

The stadium also plays host to various events such as the Sondela Youth Festival.
