= Tembu Royals F.C. =

Tembu Royals FC
- Full name: Tembu Royals Football Club
- Short name: Tembu Royals
- Founded: 1930
- Ground: Rotary Stadium (South Africa), Mthatha, Eastern Cape
- Capacity: 2.000
- Chairman: (South Africa) ??
- Coach: (South Africa) Lwandile Magula
- League: Vodacom League

Tembu Royals FC is a South African football (soccer) club based in Mthatha suburb of the city of Eastern Cape that plays in the Vodacom League.

The team was founded in 1930.

== Stadium ==
Currently the team plays at the 2000 capacity Rotary Stadium (South Africa).
