= Zuka Baloyi Stadium =

Multi-use stadium in Welkom, South Africa

Coordinates: 29.1247°S 19.3877°E

- Interactive map of Zuka Baloyi Stadium
- Address: Welkom; South africa
- Location: Welkom, Free State

Zuka Baloyi Stadium is a multi-use stadium in Welkom, Free State , South Africa. It is currently used mostly for football matches and is the home ground of Dinonyana F.C and Harmony F.C.
