= Rotary Stadium (South Africa) =

Stadium in Mthatha, Eastern Cape, South Africa

- Location: Mthatha, Eastern Cape

Rotary Stadium, also known as Mthatha Stadium and the Jerald Hawkes Stadium, is a multi-use stadium in Mthatha, Eastern Cape, South Africa. It is currently used mostly for soccer matches.

The stadium hosted the 2025–26 SAFA Second Division playoffs.

The stadium was upgraded in 2016.
