= Als Puk Tawana =

- Full name: Als Puk Tawana Football Club
- Nickname: Pukkies
- Founded: 1994
- Ground: North-West University, Potchefstroom
- Owner: North-West University
- League: SAFA Second Division, North West Province
- 2012–13 season: 15th

Als Puk Tawana is a football club from the city of Potchefstroom, North West, South Africa. They were founded in 1994 and currently play in the SAFA Second Division, the third tier of South African soccer. The club's biggest achievement, came when they knocked Platinum Stars out of the Nedbank Cup in 2010 Nedbank Cup.

The club was purchased by the North-West University in 2003, and serves as a reserve team to Premier Soccer League club Mamelodi Sundowns.
