= Makwarela =

- Location within Limpopo Location within South Africa
- Coordinates: 22.964°S 30.502°E
- Country: South Africa
- Province: Limpopo
- District: Vhembe
- Municipality: Thulamela
- Main Place: Thohoyandou

Area
  - Total: 1.65 km^{2} (0.64 sq mi)

Population (2011)
  - Total: 6,113
  - Density: 3,700/km^{2} (9,600/sq mi)

Racial makeup (2011)
  - Black African: 99.8%
  - Other: 0.2%

First languages (2011)
  - Venda: 89.7%
  - Tsonga: 2.4%
  - English: 1.4%
  - Other: 6.5%
- Time zone: UTC+2 (SAST)

Makwarela is a township situated in Limpopo Province in Vhembe district. Makwarela is one of the townships which were built in the apartheid period. Makwarela has a large variety of people mainly coming from rural backgrounds who reside there to improve their quality of life.
