= Sobantu Shooting Stars =

- Ground: Sobantu Stadium, Sobantu, Pietermaritzburg, KwaZulu-Natal, South Africa
- Capacity: N/A
- Manager: Professor Ngubane
- League: Vodacom League, KwaZulu-Natal Province
- 2010–11 season: 2

Sobantu Shootings Stars, is a South African football club based in the Sobantu township, which is a small suburb situated 4 km from the city centre of Pietermaritzburg. The club currently play in the KwaZulu-Natal province of Vodacom League.
