= Lebowakgomo Stadium =

Stadium in South Africa

- Interactive map of Lebowakgomo Stadium
- Location: Lebowakgomo, Limpopo, South Africa
- Coordinates: 24.3143°S 29.4904°E (Training field at 1km more north)
- Owner: Lepelle Nkumpi Municipality
- Capacity: 2,000

Tenant
- Fanang Diatla F.C.

Lebowakgomo Stadium is a multi-use stadium in Lebowakgomo, situated 60 km south of Polokwane, at the Limpopo province in South Africa. It is currently used mostly for football matches, and is the home venue of Fanang Diatla F.C. in the Vodacom League.

== Facilities ==
In 1993, the capacity of the stadium when hosting local community events, was reported to be 2000. The main stadium is currently dedicated to host football matches, with an adjacent training field being situated 1 km north of the stadium. Around the main stadium, there are several sports fields for other disciplines than football. The stadium was used as an official "public viewing site" during the 2010 FIFA World Cup, with local residents invited to visit and watch all 64 world cup games free of charge, at a big TV screen.

== Upgrade ==
Lepelle Nkumpi Municipality developed a refurbishment and upgrade project for Lebowakgomo stadium, with the deadline for contractors to bid at 12 November 2010.
