= Ruimsig Stadium =

Building in South Africa

- Interactive map of Ruimsig Stadium
- Location: Roodepoort, Gauteng, South Africa
- Coordinates: 26°04′18″S 27°52′00″E
- Owner: City of Johannesburg
- Capacity: 15,000

Construction
- Renovated: 2009
- Cost: R10 million (2009 refurbishment)

Ruimsig Stadium is a multi-purpose stadium located in Roodepoort, South Africa. It is used mostly for football matches and was used as a training field for teams participating in the 2010 FIFA World Cup after being renovated in 2009 and brought up to FIFA standards.

At the 2009 FIFA Confederations Cup, Iraq used Ruimsig Stadium for their training sessions.

The stadium hosted an international friendly between Australia and Denmark on 1 June 2010, and one between the USA and Australia on 5 June 2010.

Ruimsig Stadium was constructed in 1994 at a cost of R24 million as an international Athletics venue to the latest IAAF standards at the time. The track is an 8 lane full polyurethane track with duplicate facilities in both directions for all field events. Between 1995 and 2001 it hosted a number of international Athletics meetings including an IAAF Grand Prix Athletics Meeting in April 1995 as the opening event of the track [O'Neil Fourie, Stadium Designer and Project Manager Ruimsig Stadium].

The venue forms part of a multi-sport events complex which was designed so that sporting codes that require access to open land and open water can also be staged at this venue, and the events that have taken place include Road Running, Cross County Running, Triathlon, Duathlon, Mountain Biking, Off-road Triathlon, Road Cycling and model aeroplanes. The terrain was also designed to accommodate BMX, model cars and moto cross, although the various managers have at different times not always allowed motorised sport. The annual Urban Assault Mountain Bike Race at the stadium attracts up to 2,000 participants and has been running for ten years.

The facilities for the other sporting codes planned on the site have never been completed, and there are two Cricket ovals, two Football pitches, and a Hockey pitch that are grassed and in use, but the spectator seating and clubhouses planned for these facilities have never been constructed. The master plan also includes a multi-purpose indoor hall, Tennis courts, Netball courts, and multi-purpose courts, but the platforms for these facilities are used as grassed events areas for the start and finish of mountain bike races, etc.
