= Olympia Park =

Sports stadium in South Africa

Olympia Park Stadium
- Interactive map of Olympia Park Stadium
- Location: Rustenburg, South Africa
- Coordinates: 25°39′45″S 27°13′19″E
- Owner: City of Rustenburg
- Capacity: 32,000

Construction
- Opened: 1989

Tenant
- Orbit College

Olympia Park Stadion is a multi-purpose stadium located in Rustenburg, South Africa. Not to be confused with the Royal Bafokeng Stadium, where the 2010 FIFA World Cup games were played, it is currently used mostly for soccer and rugby matches; it was utilized as a training field for teams participating in the 2010 FIFA World Cup after being upgraded to meet FIFA specifications.

The ground is the home stadium of Orbit College. Upon their promotion to the 2025–26 South African Premiership, Orbit College had to utilise another stadium at the start of the season due to the floodlights not being up to Premiership standard.

== Notable matches ==
=== 1995 Rugby World Cup ===
During the 1995 Rugby World Cup, the stadium hosted three group-stage matches.

Date	Team #1	Res.	Team #2	Round	Attendance
1995-05-26	Ivory Coast	0–89	Scotland	Group D	20,000
1995-05-31	France	54–18	Ivory Coast	Group D	17,000
1995-06-04	Ivory Coast	11–29	Tonga	Group D	16,000

=== 2005 ABSA Cup final ===
The stadium hosted the 2005 ABSA Cup final, with Supersport United defeating Wits University 1–0.

== Cricket ==
=== Cricket ground ===
Olympia Park
- Interactive map of Olympia Park

Ground information
- Country: South Africa

International information
- Only women's ODI: 26 March 2005: Australia v West Indies
- As of 7 September 2020; Source: CricketArchive

In 2005, the stadium hosted a women's one-day international.

== See also ==
- List of stadiums in South Africa
- List of African stadiums by capacity
