= Alexandra Stadium (South Africa) =

Building in South Africa

- Interactive map of Alexandra Stadium
- Location: Johannesburg, Gauteng
- Coordinates: 26.10546°S 28.09973°E

Alexandra Stadium is a multi-use stadium in Alexandra, Johannesburg, Gauteng, South Africa. It is primarily used for soccer matches.

Host to top tier games between the 1940s and 1980s, featuring Orlando Pirates, Moroka Swallows, Pimville United Brothers, Pretoria Callies and others, it had fallen into dilapidation by 2019.

The stadium was revamped in 2020.

The stadium hosted the Gauteng leg of the 113th anniversary celebrations of the African National Congress.
