= HM Pitje Stadium =

Multi-purpose stadium in Mamelodi, Tshwane, South Africa

Hezekiel Mothibe Pitje Stadium
- Interactive map of Hezekiel Mothibe Pitje Stadium
- Location: Mamelodi, Tshwane, South Africa
- Coordinates: 25°42′29″S 28°20′20″E
- Owner: City of Tshwane
- Capacity: 25,000

Construction
- Renovated: 2009
- Closed: 2020
- Demolished: 2023
- Cost: R74 million (2009 refurbishment)

HM Pitje Stadium was a multi-purpose stadium located in Mamelodi, a suburb of the City of Tshwane, South Africa. It was used mostly for soccer matches and was utilized as a training field for teams participating in the 2010 FIFA World Cup after being renovated in 2009 and brought up to FIFA standards. Mamelodi Sundowns stopped using the stadium for its home games long before renovations.

In the past, it was the part-time home stadium of the Mamelodi Sundowns, who now play at the Loftus Versfeld Stadium.

The stadium was named after Hezekiel Mothibe Pitje, the first mayor of Mamelodi.

The stadium was demolished in 2023.
