= F.C. Buffalo (South Africa) =

FC Buffalo
- Full name: Football Club Buffalo
- Founded: June 2006
- Ground: Jan Smuts Stadium, East London, Eastern Cape
- Owner: Rodney Mashaya
- Coach: Velile Dyaloyi
- League: ABC Motsepe League, Eastern Cape Province
- 2010–11 season: 1st
Home colours

FC Buffalo is an association football club based in the Southernwood suburb of East London, in the Eastern Cape province of South Africa. The club was founded in June 2006, and during their first four years, they played in the SAB Regional League, the fourth level of South African football. In June 2010, they bought the Castle League franchise of The Guys, and hereby bought a promotion to play in the Vodacom League. Their first season at this level proved to be very successful. They managed to win the Eastern Cape Province, and thus qualified for the Promotional playoffs in June 2011, with a chance of further promotion to the National First Division.

Currently they are using Jan Smuts Stadium both as training field and home venue.

== Achievements ==
Won the Eastern Cape province in Vodacom League 2010–11, after achieving 21 victories, 5 draws and 4 defeats. This was good enough to win the league, 6 points ahead of Tornado. After the season, a complaint and appeal case was launched by Tornado, claiming that FC Buffalo was guilty of a disciplinary violation, and thus not the rightful winner of the division. SAFA however refused this appeal, and ruled that FC Buffalo was the rightful winner of the division, now to enter the round robin stage of the Promotional Playoffs from 7–12 June.
