= Mehlareng Stadium =

Stadium in Tembisa, South Africa

- Interactive map of Mehlareng Stadium
- Location: 1 Taras Street, Tembisa, Ekurhuleni, Gauteng, South Africa
- Coordinates: 26.0055439°S 28.2102084°E

Mehlareng Stadium is a multi-sports venue located in Tembisa, a township situated in the Ekurhuleni Metropolitan Municipality, roughly 30 km NorthEast from the Central Business District of Johannesburg. The stadium is mostly used to host football matches, and is currently the home venue of M Tigers FC in Vodacom League. This venue is also home to Dj Shimza's Show Your Legs and One Man Show which happen in September and December respectively.
