= Giyani Stadium =

Multi-use stadium in Giyani, Gazankulu, Limpopo, South Africa

Coordinates: 23°19′20″S 30°43′08″E

Giyani Stadium is a multi-use stadium in Giyani, South Africa. It is used mostly for football matches, but is also used as a large-scale concert venue, and is the home ground of Dynamos F.C. of South Africa's National First Division. The stadium has a capacity of 20,000 people.
