= OR Tambo Cosmos =

- Full name: Oliver Reginald Tambo District; Cosmos Football Club
- Founded: 1997
- Ground: Walter Sisulu University, Mthatha, King Sabata Dalindyebo Local Municipality
- Capacity: 6,000
- Chairman: Bongile Nkola
- Manager: (Zimbabwe) Tauya Mrewa
- League: Vodacom League, Eastern Cape
- 2006–07: National First Division, 18th
Home colours	Away colours

OR Tambo Cosmos is a South African football (soccer) club from Mthatha (OR Tambo District Municipality, Eastern Cape) that participates in the Vodacom League.
