= KaNyamazane Stadium =

Building in South Africa

- Interactive map of KaNyamazane Stadium
- Former names: Lekazi Stadium
- Location: 179 Chris Hani Street, KaNyamazane (Mbombela Local Municipality, Ehlanzeni District Municipality); Mpumalanga, South Africa
- Coordinates: 25.4649°S 31.1819°E
- Owner: Mbombela Municipality
- Capacity: 15,000
- Surface: Grass

Construction
- Renovated: May 2009-May 2010, (price: R49.5 million)
- Project manager: Lidwala Consulting Engineers

Tenant
- Kruger United

KaNyamazane Stadium, formerly also named Lekazi Stadium, is a multi-use stadium in the KaNyamazane township, South Africa. It is situated 2.5km from Mthethomusha Game Reserve -also referred to as the SouthWestern corner of Kruger National Park; which is roughly 25 kilometres east of Mbombela, in the Mpumalanga province. The stadium received a significant upgrade from May 2009 to May 2010.

The stadium is used mostly for local events and soccer matches. However, it was not picked by any teams at the three highest levels of South African football in 2008-10. After being upgraded, it became the new official home venue of both Mbombela United and Thabo All Stars, in June 2010.

As of 2025, it is the home of Kruger United.

== Upgrade ==
The stadium received a significant upgrade from May 2009 to May 2010. A primary driving force for the upgrade, was that the local municipality was asked to prepare a high quality training venue -with FIFA standard-, ahead of the 2010 FIFA World Cup. New maximum capacity of the stadium was reported to be 15,000. The stadium was subsequently used as training field by one of the qualified World Cup teams in June 2010, and it also hosted a friendly 2-0 match between Chile and New Zealand, few days ahead of the World Cup.

Apparently the upgrade was implemented in two phases, with upgrading of the floodlight and electrical installations being completed at a cost of R28.5 million, already in May 2009. Followed by other upgrade improvements, first at a planned cost of R13 million in the next budget year of the municipality, and upon the start of the second phase in September 2009, the budget of the project was increased to R22.8 million.

The second phase of the upgrade project, for the stadium to comply with FIFA standards for World Cup training venues, was reported in the end to have costed an extra R21 million. The upgrade included a construction of: Two FIFA offices at 58m², Two more player changing rooms -upgrading from two to four, Doping room, Referee dressing room, Player’s and public first aid room, Media provision complete with temporary studio and public announcement area, Security centre and Operations rooms, Central store, Flood lighting of the field at minimum 500 lux, Standby power system, Standby storage of water, and pitch improvement to the same quality as the Mbombela Stadium.

The upgrade project was finalized in February 2010, and there was an official opening and handover of the upgraded stadium at 4 May.
