= Richards Bay Stadium =

Multi-use stadium in Richards Bay, South Africa

Richards Bay Sports Stadium
- Interactive map of Richards Bay Sports Stadium
- Location: Via Verbena, Richards Bay, KwaZulu-Natal, South Africa
- Coordinates: 28.743392°S 32.055874°E
- Capacity: 10,500
- Surface: Grass

Richards Bay Stadium is a multi-use stadium in Richards Bay, KwaZulu-Natal, South Africa. It is part of the uMhlathuze Sports Complex and used mostly for soccer matches, and is currently the home venue for Premiership club Richards Bay F.C.

In September 2021, a Premier Soccer League (PSL) disciplinary committee banned Richards Bay F.C. from using the ground for a period of two years. Stadium issues had been ongoing, with water dripping through into the players' changing rooms, broken ceiling panels, broken toilets, unserviced fire extinguishers and power cables running through water on the floor in the main stand. The ban could be lifted earlier if requirements were met.

In August 2026, shortly before the start of the 2026–27 Premiership, the PSL imposed a four-week ban on the stadium, after inspectors found the pitch to be unsuitable.
