= Pilditch Stadium =

Multi-use stadium in Pretoria, Gauteng, South Africa

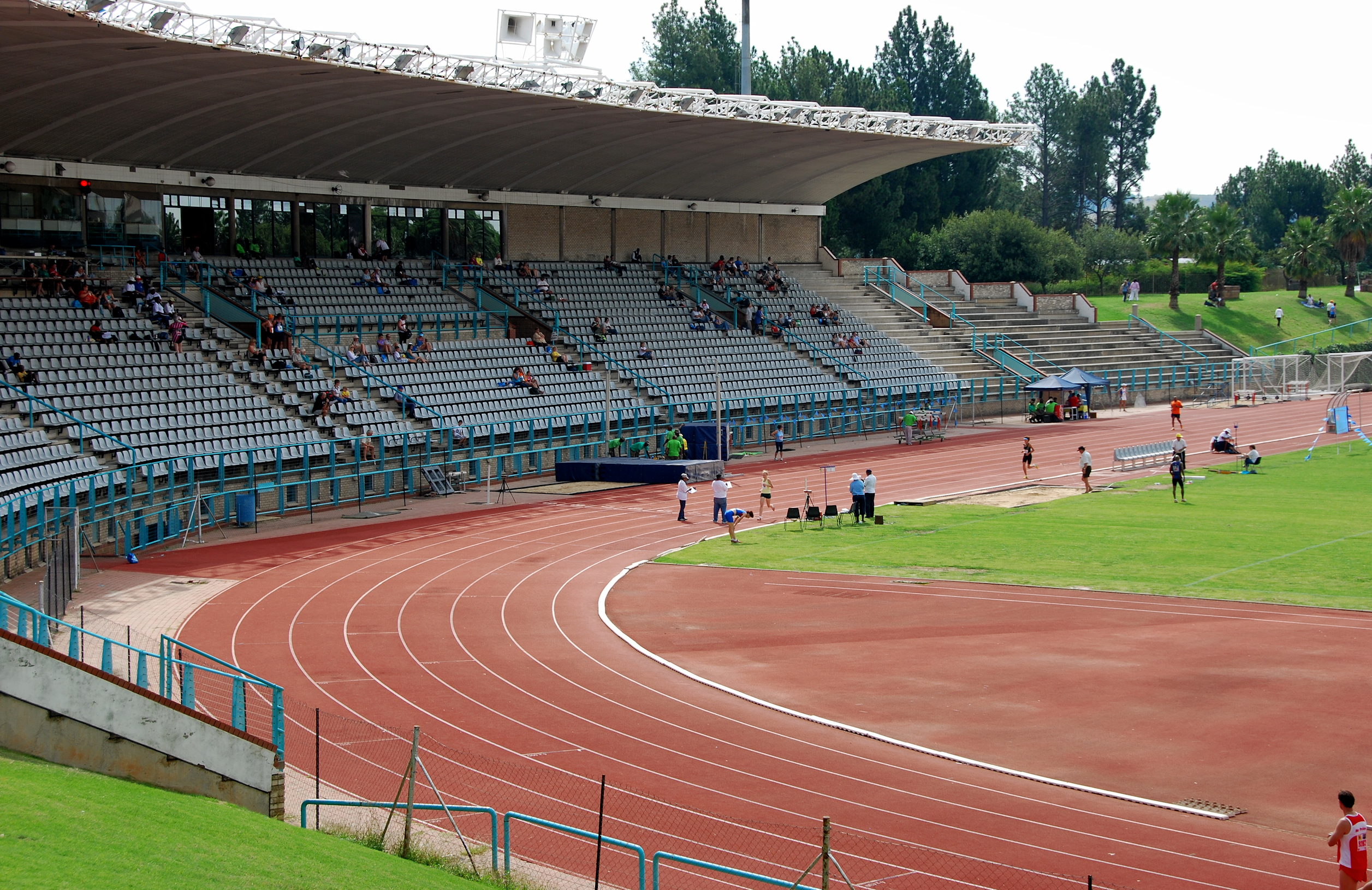
- Interactive map of Pilditch Stadium
- Location: Maltzan St / Soutter St (corner); West Pretoria, Pretoria, Gauteng, South Africa
- Coordinates: 25.751667°S 28.164722°E
- Owner: City of Tshwane
- Capacity: 20 000
- Surface: Tartan/Concrete/Grass

Construction
- Built: 1955
- Renovated: 2021

Tenants
- Supersport United (2nd team); Garankuwa United

Pilditch Stadium is a multi-use stadium in the show grounds complex of Pretoria city, situated at the Northern part of the Gauteng province in South Africa. It is used for track and field athletics and football matches, and is currently used as home venue by the two Vodacom League teams: Supersport United (2nd team) and Garankuwa United.
