= Philippi Stadium =

Soccer stadium in Cape Town, Western Cape, South Africa

- Interactive map of Philippi Stadium
- Location: White Hart Lane, Philippi, Cape Town, Western Cape, South Africa
- Coordinates: 34°1′5″S 18°35′20″E
- Owner: Provincial Government of the Western Cape
- Operator: Provincial Government of the Western Cape
- Capacity: 10,000
- Surface: Artificial turf

Construction
- Renovated: 2009

The Philippi Stadium is located in Cape Town, Western Cape, South Africa and is used for soccer matches. The Phillipi Stadium precinct was developed as a practice venue and fan park for the 2010 FIFA World Cup.

The cost was estimated at R90 million and intended to include retail and commercial components. The venue, which seated 2,000, and included an athletics and cycle track, was to be replaced by the new 10,000 seat football stadium.

Vasco da Gama played some games.

Since the departure of anchor tenant Chippa United, the stadium became vacant and was vandalised.

In October 2024, SAFA Cape Town announced plans to use the stadium as its headquarters, and to revamp the stadium.
