= Botshabelo Stadium =

Multi-use stadium in Botshabelo, Free State, South Africa

Kaizer Sebothelo Stadium
- Interactive map of Kaizer Sebothelo Stadium
- Full name: Kaizer Sebothelo Stadium
- Former names: Botshabelo Stadium
- Location: Botshabelo Township in Bloemfontein
- Coordinates: 29.23136°S 26.70078°E
- Operator: Mangaung Metropolitan Municipality
- Capacity: 22,000
- Surface: Grass
- Scoreboard: yes
- Record attendance: 35,000

Construction
- Built: 1989
- Opened: 1990
- Renovated: 2009, 2014

The Kaizer Sebothelo Stadium, formerly the Botshabelo Stadium, is a multi-use stadium in Botshabelo, east of Bloemfontein, South Africa. It is currently used mostly for soccer matches and is the home ground of Mathaithai, who play in the ABC Motsepe League, and previously D'General.
