= Ackerville Stadium =

South African sports stadium

- Interactive map of Ackerville Stadium
- Former names: Sy Mthimunye Stadium
- Location: Willie Ackermann Drive, eMalahleni, Witbank, Mpumalanga, South Africa
- Coordinates: 25.869515°S 29.176458°E
- Capacity: 11,000
- Surface: Grass

Construction
- Renovated: 2003

Tenant
- Calaska F.C.

Ackerville Stadium is a multi-use stadium in Witbank, Mpumalanga, South Africa. It is currently used mostly for football matches and is the home ground of Calaska F.C. who play in the Vodacom League.
