= 2009–10 Nedbank Cup =

Tournament details
- Country: South Africa
- Teams: 32

Final positions
- Champions: Bidvest Wits

The 2009–10 Nedbank Cup was the 2009–10 edition of South Africa's premier knockout club football (soccer) competition, the Nedbank Cup.

Bidvest Wits defeated AmaZulu 3–0 in the final, winning the cup for the first time since 1978.

The final was played at the FNB Stadium, which had been revamped for the 2010 FIFA World Cup.

== Results ==
=== Preliminary round ===
Home team	Score	Away team
16 December 2010
Thanda Royal Zulu	3–3 (a.e.t.) (4–3 p)	Bay United
Vasco Da Gama	2–1	United FC
African Warriors	0–1 (a.e.t.)	University of Pretoria
Ikapa Sporting	2–0	Batau FC
Black Leopards	7–1	Hanover Park
FC Cape Town	2–1	Witbank Spurs
Carara Kicks	2–2 (a.e.t.) (2–4 p)	Winners Park
Dynamos	abandoned (Note: Abandoned at 1–1 in extra time due to lightning, Nathi Lions progressed)	Nathi Lions

=== Round of 32 ===
Home team	Score	Away team
14 April 2010
Platinum Stars	2–3	Als Puk Tawana
Thanda Royal Zulu	2–1	Peace Lovers FC
Orlando Pirates	2–1	Bloemfontein Celtic
16 April 2010
Nathi Lions	2–3 (a.e.t.)	Bidvest Wits
17 April 2010
Maritzburg United	0–1	AmaZulu
Moroka Swallows	2–0	Lamontville Golden Arrows
Tower United	1–6	Free State Stars
Santos	1–1 (a.e.t.) (4–5 p)	Jomo Cosmos
M Tigers	1–2	Black Leopards
University of Pretoria	5–1	Vasco Da Gama
18 April 2010
Mr Price Parkhurst	1–3	Winners Park
Ajax Cape Town	5–0	Wings United
Island FC	1–3	Mamelodi Sundowns
SuperSport United	1–2	Kaizer Chiefs
Ikapa Sporting	1–2	FC Cape Town
FC Royals	2–2 (a.e.t.) (3–5 p)	Mpumalanga Black Aces

=== Round of 16 ===
Home team	Score	Away team
24 April 2010
Ajax Cape Town	1–1 (a.e.t.) (2–4 p)	Free State Stars
Moroka Swallows	2–2 (a.e.t.) (5–6 p)	AmaZulu
25 April 2010
Jomo Cosmos	1–1 (a.e.t.) (2–4 p)	University of Pretoria
FC Cape Town	2–0	Kaizer Chiefs
1 May 2010
Bidvest Wits	4–1	Thanda Royal Zulu
Orlando Pirates	4–0	Als Puk Tawana
2 May 2010
Mamelodi Sundowns	1–0	Black Leopards
Winners Park	0–1	Mpumalanga Black Aces

=== Quarter-finals ===
Home team	Score	Away team
8 May 2010
Bidvest Wits	0–0 (a.e.t.) (4–3 p)	FC Cape Town
AmaZulu	2–1	University of Pretoria
9 May 2010
Mamelodi Sundowns	3–1 (a.e.t.)	Orlando Pirates
Free State Stars	2–0	Mpumalanga Black Aces

=== Semi-finals ===
Home team	Score	Away team
15 May 2010
Free State Stars	1–3 (a.e.t.)	Bidvest Wits
AmaZulu	1–1 (a.e.t.) (4–3 p)	Mamelodi Sundowns

=== Final ===
22 May 2010	Bidvest Wits	3–0	AmaZulu	Johannesburg
	Chansa 72'; Mbuyane 75'; Mbuyane 89'			Stadium: FNB Stadium
