= 2011–12 Nedbank Cup =

2011-12 Nedbank Cup
ke yona (the one)

Tournament details
- Country: South Africa
- Teams: 16 (preliminary round - 8 qualifiers); 32 (main tournament); 40 (total)

Final positions
- Champions: SuperSport United 3rd title
- Runners-up: Mamelodi Sundowns

The Nedbank Cup is a South African club football (soccer) tournament. The knockout tournament, based on the English FA Cup format, was one of a weak opponent facing a stronger one. The competition was sponsored by ABSA until 2007, after which Nedbank took over sponsorship.

The winner of the 2011–12 Nedbank Cup winners, SuperSport United, qualified for the 2013 CAF Confederation Cup.

== Format ==
The 16 Premier Soccer League clubs, 8 National First Division teams, as well as 8 teams from the amateur ranks compete for the prize money of R6 million. The winner also qualifies for the CAF Confederation Cup.

The preliminary round features all 16 National First Division teams and will be reduced to eight when the teams play on 12 December 2012.

The teams are not seeded at any stage, and the first 16 sides drawn out of the hat receive a home-ground advantage. There are no longer any replays in the tournament, and any games which end in a draw after 90 minutes are subject to 30 minutes extra time followed by penalties if necessary.

== Teams ==
The 32 teams competing in the Nedbank Cup competition are: (listed according to their league that they are playing in).

=== Premier Soccer League ===
- 1. Ajax Cape Town
- 2. AmaZulu
- 3. Bidvest Wits
- 4. Black Leopards
- 5. Bloemfontein Celtic
- 6. Free State Stars
- 7. Golden Arrows
- 8. Jomo Cosmos
- 9. Kaizer Chiefs
- 10. Mamelodi Sundowns
- 11. Maritzburg United
- 12. Moroka Swallows
- 13. Orlando Pirates
- 14. Platinum Stars
- 15. Santos
- 16. Supersport United

=== National First Division ===
- 17. African Warriors
- 18. Blackburn Rovers
- 19. Mpumalanga Black Aces
- 20. Polokwane City
- 21. Sivutsa Stars
- 22. United FC
- 23. University of Pretoria
- 24. Witbank Spurs

=== Vodacom League ===
- 25. Roses United
- 26. Ethekwini Coastal
- 27. Vardos
- 28. The Dolphins
- 29. Batau
- 30. Powerlines F.C.
- 31. Cape Town All Stars
- 32. North West Shining Stars

== Results ==
=== Preliminary round ===
The preliminary round saw National First Division sides play each other is a knockout round to decide who would compete in the 2012 Nedbank Cup.

Preliminary round match details
Date	Home team	Score	Away team
14 December 2011	Mpumalanga Black Aces	1–0	Atlie
14 December 2011	Witbank Spurs	4–1	FC AK
14 December 2011	Royal Eagles	3–0	Carara Kicks
14 December 2011	Polokwane City	1–0	Chippa United
14 December 2011	Vasco da Gama	1–2	United FC
14 December 2011	African Warriors	2–0	FC Cape Town
14 December 2011	Blackburn Rovers	1–0	Thanda Royal Zulu
14 December 2011	Dynamos	1–3	University of Pretoria

=== Round of 32 ===
Round of 32 match details
Date	Home team	Score	Away team
2 March 2012	Maritzburg United	2–0 (a.e.t.)	Bloemfontein Celtic
3 March 2012	African Warriors	1–2	Jomo Cosmos
3 March 2012	Mpumalanga Black Aces	1–1 (a.e.t.) (2–3 p)	Witbank Spurs
3 March 2012	Lamontville Golden Arrows	5–0	North West Shining Stars
3 March 2012	Kaizer Chiefs	3–0	Cape Town All Stars
4 March 2012	Batau	1–1 (a.e.t.) (2–4 p)	SuperSport United
4 March 2012	Powerlines	0–24	Mamelodi Sundowns
7 March 2012	Santos	1–0	University of Pretoria
7 March 2012	Platinum Stars	5–0	The Dolphins
9 March 2012	Moroka Swallows	0–1	Bidvest Wits
10 March 2012	Free State Stars	4–1	Royal Eagles
10 March 2012	Vardos	1–3	United FC
10 March 2012	Black Leopards	2–0	Blackburn Rovers
10 March 2012	Ethekwini Coastal	0–1	Orlando Pirates
11 March 2012	Roses United	2–0	Polokwane City
13 March 2012	AmaZulu	3–3 (a.e.t.) (4–3 p)	Ajax Cape Town

=== Round of 16 ===
Round of 16 match details
Date	Home team	Score	Away team
24 March 2012	Orlando Pirates	1–2 (a.e.t.)	Free State Stars
24 March 2012	AmaZulu	1–0	Witbank Spurs
25 March 2012	Bidvest Wits	0–2	Mamelodi Sundowns
25 March 2012	Roses United	0–1	Santos
31 March 2012	Lamontville Golden Arrows	0–2	Maritzburg United
31 March 2012	Black Leopards	0–4	Kaizer Chiefs
1 April 2012	Jomo Cosmos	1–1 (a.e.t.) (4–3 p)	Platinum Stars
1 April 2012	United FC	0–1	SuperSport United

=== Quarter-finals ===
Quarter-final match details
Date	Home team	Score	Away team
14 April 2012	Mamelodi Sundowns	2–0	Maritzburg United
14 April 2012	Kaizer Chiefs	0–1	Free State Stars
15 April 2012	AmaZulu	1–0	Santos
15 April 2012	SuperSport United	1–0	Jomo Cosmos

=== Semifinals ===
Semi-final match details
Date	Home team	Score	Away team
5 May 2012	Mamelodi Sundowns	2–0	Free State Stars
6 May 2012	SuperSport United	3–0	AmaZulu

=== Final ===
26 May 2012

SuperSport United	2–0	Mamelodi Sundowns
September 40'; Erasmus 71'

Orlando Stadium, Johannesburg
Referee: Gabriel Sekopo
