= 2009–10 South African Premiership =

Premiership
- Season: 2009–10
- Champions: Supersport United; 3rd Premiership title
- Relegated: Jomo Cosmos
- 2011 CAF Champions League: Supersport United
- 2011 CAF Confederation Cup: Bidvest Wits (2010 Nedbank Cup winner)
- Matches: 240
- Goals: 499 (2.08 per match)
- Top goalscorer: Katlego Mphela (17)
- Biggest home win: Orlando Pirates 4–0 Jomo Cosmos (29-Aug-09); Santos 4–0 Maritzburg United (7 Nov 2009)
- Biggest away win: Mpumalanga Black Aces 0–5 Supersport United (17 Oct 2009)
- Highest scoring: Bloemfontein Celtic 2–5 Platinum Stars (16 Dec 2009) (7 goals)
- Average attendance: 7,639

The 2009–10 South African Premiership season, known as the ABSA Premiership for sponsorship purposes, and also commonly referred to as the PSL after the governing body, was the fourteenth since its establishment in 1996.

Supersport United were the defending champions, having won their second premier league title in the 2008–09 season. The campaign began in August 2009, and ended in March 2010. A total of 16 teams competed in the league. SuperSport United were crowned champions for the third successive time two matches before the end despite losing to Bidvest Wits (1–2) in the last match.

== Clubs ==
- Ajax Cape Town
- AmaZulu
- Bidvest Wits
- Bloemfontein Celtic
- Free State Stars
- Golden Arrows
- Jomo Cosmos
- Kaizer Chiefs
- Mamelodi Sundowns
- Maritzburg United
- Moroka Swallows
- Mpumalanga Black Aces
- Orlando Pirates
- Platinum Stars
- Santos
- Supersport United

== Promotion and relegation ==
=== Pre-Season ===
Semifinals
1	Carara Kicks	1	1	2
2	Mpumalanga Black Aces	1	2	3
15	Thanda Royal Zulu	0	1	1
2	F.C. Cape Town	0	1	1

Final
2	Mpumalanga Black Aces	0	3	3
15	Thanda Royal Zulu	0	0	0

- Champions of the Inland Stream Jomo Cosmos took on Champions of the Coastal Stream Carara Kicks in a two leg playoff for promotion to the Premiership.
- The first leg of the play-off saw the match end in a goalless draw at the Charles Mopeli Stadium on 7 May 2009.
- The second leg of the play-off saw Jomo Cosmos win Carara Kicks 2 – 1 at Vaal Technikon on 10 May 2009 to see Jomo Cosmos promoted to the Premiership.
- Thanda Royal Zulu who finished 15th on the Premiership table will go into a mini play-off tournament with Carara Kicks (who lost their play-off match with Jomo Cosmos), Mpumalanga Black Aces (who finished second in the Inland Stream) and F.C. Cape Town (who finished second in the Coastal Stream).
- Carara Kicks will face Mpumalanga Black Aces and Thanda Royal Zulu will face F.C. Cape Town

Teams promoted from 2008 to 2009 National First Division

- Champions (Inland Stream) Jomo Cosmos
- Play-offs: Mpumalanga Black Aces

Teams relegated to 2009–10 National First Division

- Last in Premiership: Bay United
- Play-offs: Thanda Royal Zulu

=== Post-Season ===
Teams promoted from 2009 to 2010 National First Division

- Champions Vasco Da Gama
- Play-offs: None Mpumalanga Black Aces F.C. retained their Premiership status by winning the play-offs

Teams relegated to 2010–11 National First Division

- Last in Premiership: Jomo Cosmos
- Play-offs: None Mpumalanga Black Aces F.C. retained their Premiership status by winning the play-offs

== League table ==
Pos	Team	Pld	W	D	L	GF	GA	GD	Pts	Qualification or relegation
1	Supersport United (C)	30	16	9	5	51	25	+26	57	Qualification for the 2011 CAF Champions League
2	Mamelodi Sundowns	30	16	8	6	43	24	+19	56	
3	Kaizer Chiefs	30	14	9	7	39	25	+14	51	
4	Santos	30	12	11	7	34	20	+14	47	
5	Orlando Pirates	30	10	14	6	26	18	+8	44	
6	Bloemfontein Celtic	30	9	15	6	38	35	+3	42	
7	Ajax Cape Town	30	11	9	10	27	29	−2	42	
8	Moroka Swallows	30	11	9	10	30	36	−6	42	
9	AmaZulu	30	11	6	13	30	35	−5	39	
10	Bidvest Wits	30	7	14	9	32	38	−6	35	Qualification for the 2011 CAF Confederation Cup
11	Maritzburg United	30	8	11	11	28	39	−11	35	
12	Golden Arrows	30	6	14	10	25	33	−8	32	
13	Free State Stars	30	5	16	9	29	30	−1	31	
14	Platinum Stars	30	9	4	17	26	34	−8	31	
15	Mpumalanga Black Aces (O)	30	5	11	14	20	38	−18	26	Qualification for the relegation play-offs
16	Jomo Cosmos (R)	30	4	12	14	21	40	−19	24	Relegated to National First Division

Updated to match(es) played on 6 March 2010. Source:
Rules for classification: Three points for a win and one point for a draw.
(C) 2009–10 Premiership champions; (O) Play-off winners; (R) Relegated

== Fixtures and results ==
Home \ Away	AJX	AMZ	BVW	BLC	FSS	GOL	JC	KZC	MLS	MAR	MOR	MBA	ORL	PLA	SAN	SUP
Ajax Cape Town		0–0	1–1	1–0	0–0	0–0	1–0	0–3	0–1	1–1	2–0	1–1	0–1	2–0	0–2	1–1
AmaZulu	0–1		2–2	2–1	1–0	0–1	0–0	2–3	0–3	0–1	2–1	0–0	2–1	2–1	0–2	3–0
Bidvest Wits	0–2	1–2		1–1	1–1	2–1	3–1	0–3	4–2	1–1	0–0	0–1	0–0	2–0	0–3	1–2
Bloemfontein Celtic	4–2	1–1	3–0		2–2	2–2	3–3	1–0	0–2	0–2	1–1	2–5	1–1	2–0	1–1	1–1
Free State Stars	1–1	1–0	1–1	0–1		3–1	2–2	0–1	2–2	0–0	0–1	2–0	0–0	0–1	3–3	0–1
Golden Arrows	1–1	1–2	3–3	1–1	0–1		2–0	0–0	1–0	1–1	1–3	2–1	0–0	1–1	1–1	1–0
Jomo Cosmos	0–1	1–1	0–0	0–1	0–0	0–1		1–2	2–0	0–0	1–2	2–1	1–0	0–0	1–0	1–3
Kaizer Chiefs	2–1	1–0	0–1	1–1	2–1	2–0	2–2		1–2	0–1	1–2	2–0	0–0	3–1	0–0	0–2
Mamelodi Sundowns	1–2	2–0	1–0	0–0	1–1	4–0	3–1	2–2		1–0	3–3	2–0	2–0	1–0	0–0	1–1
Maritzburg United	2–1	2–0	1–1	2–4	1–1	1–0	1–1	1–3	1–5		1–1	1–0	2–1	1–3	0–1	1–1
Moroka Swallows	2–1	0–4	0–2	0–0	2–1	0–0	1–0	0–0	0–1	2–0		1–1	0–1	1–0	1–0	0–3
Mpumalanga Black Aces	1–2	2–0	1–1	0–0	1–1	0–0	0–0	3–3	0–1	1–0	2–1		1–1	1–1	1–2	0–5
Orlando Pirates	3–0	2–0	1–1	3–1	0–0	1–0	4–0	0–0	0–0	1–1	2–2	1–0		1–0	0–1	0–0
Platinum Stars	0–1	0–1	3–1	1–2	0–3	2–1	2–0	0–1	2–0	1–0	0–1	0–1	0–1		1–0	0–1
Santos	1–0	1–0	0–0	0–1	2–2	1–1	1–1	0–1	1–0	4–0	2–0	1–0	0–0	2–0		1–2
SuperSport United	0–1	4–2	1–2	0–0	2–0	1–1	3–0	1–0	0–1	3–2	4–2	3–0	3–0	1–1	2–2	

Source: Premier Soccer League
Legend: Blue = home team win; Yellow = draw; Red = away team win.

== Top goalscorers ==
As of March 28, 2010

17 goals

- (South Africa) Katlego Mphela (Mamelodi Sundowns)

13 goals

- (Nigeria) Prince Olomu (Bloemfontein Celtic)

11 goals

- (South Africa) Calvin Kadi (Bidvest Wits)

10 goals

- (South Africa) Daine Klate (SuperSport United)
- (South Africa) Ayanda Dlamini (AmaZulu)

8 goals

- (South Africa) Richard Henyekane (Golden Arrows)
- (South Africa) Erwin Isaacs (Santos )
- (South Africa) Phikolethu Spelman (Santos)

7 goals

- (Zambia) Clifford Mulenga (Mpumalanga Black Aces)
- (South Africa) Mark Haskins (Bidvest Wits )
- (Liberia) Anthony Laffor (SuperSport United)

6 goals

- (South Africa) Morgan Gould (SuperSport United)
- (South Africa) Siyabonga Nomvethe (Moroka Swallows )
- (South Africa) Glen Salmon (SuperSport United)
- (South Africa) Toni Nhleko (Kaizer Chiefs)
- (Botswana) Dipsy Selolwane (Ajax Cape Town )
- (South Africa) Siphiwe Tshabalala (SuperSport United)

== Premiership managers ==
Manager	Club
(Netherlands) Foppe de Haan	Ajax Cape Town
(South Africa) Neil Tovey	AmaZulu
(South Africa) Roger De Sa	Bidvest Wits
(South Africa) Owen Da Gama	Bloemfontein Celtic
(South Africa) Gordon Igesund	Free State Stars
(South Africa) Manqoba Mngqithi	Golden Arrows
(South Africa) Jomo Sono	Jomo Cosmos
(Serbia) Vladimir Vermezović	Kaizer Chiefs
(Bulgaria) Hristo Stoichkov	Mamelodi Sundowns
(Germany) Ernst Middendorp	Maritzburg United
(Germany) Rainer Zobel	Moroka Swallows
(Cyprus) Akis Agiomamitis	Mpumalanga Black Aces F.C.
(Netherlands) Ruud Krol	Orlando Pirates
(South Africa) Boebie Solomons	Santos
(South Africa) Steve Komphela	Platinum Stars
(South Africa) Gavin Hunt	Supersport United

== Kits 2009–2010 ==
Team	Supplier	Shirt sponsor
Ajax CT	Adidas	MTN
AmaZulu	Reebok	SPAR
Bidvest Wits	Hummel	Bidvest
Bloemfontein Celtic	Reebok	Vodacom
Engen Santos	Canterbury	Engen
Free State Stars	Umbro	Bonitas
Golden Arrows	Millé	MTN
Jomo Cosmos	Puma	Vacant
Kaizer Chiefs	Nike	Vodacom
Mamelodi Sundowns	Nike	Ubuntu Botho
Maritzburg United	Joma	Vacant
Moroka Swallows	Mitre	VW
Mpumalanga Black Aces	Umbro	Lakama
Orlando Pirates	Adidas	Vodacom
Platinum Stars	Diadora	Dunns
Supersport United	Under Armour	DStv

== Attendances ==
#	Football club	Average attendance
1	Kaizer Chiefs	21,733
2	Mpumalanga Black Aces	18,920
3	Bloemfontein Celtic	17,067
4	Orlando Pirates	12,333
5	Mamelodi Sundowns	7,467
6	SuperSport United	6,000
7	Maritzburg United	5,767
8	AmaZulu FC	5,733
9	Platinum Stars	5,700
10	Ajax Cape Town	5,567
11	Lamontville Golden Arrows	5,192
12	Moroka Swallows	4,267
13	Santos Football Club	4,173
14	Free State Stars	3,783
15	Bidvest Wits	3,713
16	Jomo Cosmos	2,173

== See also ==
- List of South African football transfers 2009–10
