= 2012–13 Nedbank Cup =

ke yona (the one)

Tournament details
- Country: South Africa
- Dates: 12 Dec 2012 – May 2013
- Teams: 16 (preliminary round – 8 qualifiers); 32 (main tournament); 40 (total)

Final positions
- Champions: Kaizer Chiefs (13th title)
- Runners-up: Supersport United

Nedbank Cup is a South African club football (soccer) tournament. The knockout tournament, based on the English FA Cup format, was one of a weak opponent facing a stronger one. The competition was sponsored by ABSA until 2007, after which Nedbank took over sponsorship.

The winner of the 2012–13 Nedbank Cup will qualify for the 2014 CAF Confederation Cup.

== Format ==
The 16 Premier Soccer League clubs, 8 National First Division teams, as well as 8 teams from the amateur ranks compete for the prize money of R6 million. The winner also qualifies for the CAF Confederation Cup.

The preliminary round features all 16 National First Division teams and will be reduced to eight when the teams play on 12 December 2012.

The teams are not seeded at any stage, and the first 16 sides drawn out of the hat receive a home-ground advantage. There are no longer any replays in the tournament, and any games which end in a draw after 90 minutes are subject to 30 minutes extra time followed by penalties if necessary.

== Teams ==
The 32 teams competing in the Nedbank Cup competition are: (listed according to their league that they are playing in).

=== Premier Soccer League ===
- 1. Ajax Cape Town
- 2. AmaZulu
- 3. Bidvest Wits
- 4. Black Leopards
- 5. Bloemfontein Celtic
- 6. Chippa United
- 7. Free State Stars
- 8. Golden Arrows
- 9. Kaizer Chiefs
- 10. Mamelodi Sundowns
- 11. Maritzburg United
- 12. Moroka Swallows
- 13. Orlando Pirates
- 14. Platinum Stars
- 15. Supersport United
- 16. University of Pretoria

=== National First Division ===
- 17. African Warriors
- 18. Dynamos
- 19. Jomo Cosmos
- 20. Milano United
- 21. Polokwane City
- 22. United FC
- 23. Vasco Da Gama
- 24. Witbank Spurs

=== Vodacom League ===
- 25. Cape Town All Stars
- 26. Island FC
- 27. Jacksa Spears
- 28. Magesi
- 29. Maluti FET College
- 30. Mbombela United
- 31. Temba Royals FC
- 32. Vardos FC

== Results ==
=== Preliminary round ===
The preliminary round will see National First Division sides play each other is a knockout round to decide who will compete in the 2013 Nedbank Cup. All the game were scheduled to be played on 12 December 2012, but were postponed to 12 February 2013 due to a technical issue regarding the validity of the Rules for the preliminary qualification round and the winners of each game will go into the draw to determine the fixtures for the first round.

| 12 February 2013 | Sivutsa Stars | 0–1 | African Warriors |

| 12 February 2013 | Vasco Da Gama | 3–2 | Santos |
| | George Akpabio 50'; Gertse 57'; Jonty Fransma 79' | | Darron Omaticus 6'; Roelf 75' |

| 12 February 2013 | Polokwane City | 2–0 (a.e.t.) | FC AK |

| 12 February 2013 | United FC | 2–1 | Roses United |

| 12 February 2013 | Dynamos | 3–1 | Mpumalanga Black Aces |
| | Daniel Mofokeng 58'; Andries Dube 85'; Wilfred Mothapo 87' | | Luckyboy Mokoena 24' |

| 12 February 2013 | Milano United | 1–0 (a.e.t.) | Thanda Royal Zulu |

| 12 February 2013 | Witbank Spurs | 2–1 | Blackburn Rovers |
| | Ngobe 39'; Ndzimande 58' |

| 12 February 2013 | Jomo Cosmos | 3–2 (a.e.t.) | FC Cape Town |

=== First round (round of 32) ===
The draw for the First round of the Nedbank Cup was done on Monday 15 January 2013. The first round ties will be played the weekend of 22–24 February and 27 February, with the exact dates, venues and kick-off times to be decided by the PSL Cup Committee.

| 22 February 2013 | Ajax Cape Town | 0–1 (a.e.t.) | Mamelodi Sundowns | Cape Town Stadium |
| 20:00 | | Report | Tebogo Langerman 127' |

| 23 February 2013 | Maluti FET College | 4–1 | Orlando Pirates | Charles Mopeli Stadium |
| 15:00 | | Report |

| 23 February 2013 | United FC | 3–2 (a.e.t.) | Chippa United | Moruleng Stadium |
| 15:00 | | Report |

| 23 February 2013 | Supersport United | 0–0 (a.e.t.) (5–3 p) | Moroka Swallows | Lucas Moripe Stadium |
| 18:00 | | Report |
| | Penalties |
| | Erasmus (penalty scored); Gyimah (penalty scored); J Maluleke (penalty scored); Diouf (penalty scored); Grobler (penalty scored) | | Nomvete (penalty scored); Cohen (penalty scored); Da Costa (penalty missed); Tsutsulupa (penalty scored) |

| 23 February 2013 | Vardos FC | 0–4 | Golden Arrows | Makhulong Stadium |
| 20:15 | | Report |

| 23 February 2013 | Bidvest Wits | 0–3 | Kaizer Chiefs | Mbombela Stadium |
| 20:15 | | Report |

| 23 February 2013 | University of Pretoria | 0–0 (a.e.t.) (2–4 p) | Maritzburg United | Absa Tuks Stadium |
| 20:15 | | Report |
| | Penalties |
| | Radebe (penalty scored); Niang (penalty missed); Sekotlong (penalty missed); Ngoma (penalty scored) | | Buckley (penalty scored); Awal (penalty scored); Mandaza (penalty scored); Malajila (penalty scored) |

| 24 February 2013 | Island FC | 2–7 | Polokwane City | Ulundi Stadium |
| 15:00 |

| 24 February 2013 | Mbombela United | 1–4 | Vasco Da Gama | Kanyamazane Stadium |
| 15:00 | | Report |

| 24 February 2013 | Free State Stars | 1–0 | Witbank Spurs | Goble Park |
| 15:00 | | Report |

| 24 February 2013 | Bloemfontein Celtic | 4–1 | Milano United | Free State Stadium |
| 15:00 | | Report |

| 24 February 2013 | Dynamos | 0–1 | Platinum Stars | Giyani Stadium |
| 15:00 | | Report |

| 24 February 2013 | Magesi FC | 0–2 | Jomo Cosmos | Old Peter Mokaba Stadium |
| 15:00 | | Report |

| 27 February 2013 | AmaZulu | 1–2 | Temba Royals FC | King Zwelithini Stadium |
| 19;30 |

| 27 February 2013 | Black Leopards | 5–4 | Cape Town All Stars | Old Peter Mokaba Stadium |

| 27 February 2013 | African Warriors | 3–0 | Jacksa Spears | Charles Mopeli Stadium |

=== Second round (round of 16) ===
| 13 March 2013 | Vasco Da Gama | 1–2 | Supersport United | Athlone Stadium |
| 19:30 | R. Do Espirito Santo 20' | | 38' MA. Haskins; 83' T. Nkoana |

| 13 March 2013 | Black Leopards | 0–2 | Platinum Stars | Old Peter Mokaba Stadium |
| 19:30 | | | 28' TE. Tshabalala; 60' H. Botes |

| 15 March 2013 | Mamelodi Sundowns | 1–0 | Golden Arrows | Loftus Versfeld Stadium |
| 20:00 | AS. Laffor 81' |

| 16 March 2013 | Jomo Cosmos | 0–1 | United FC | Makhulong Stadium |
| 15:00 | | | 48' LC. Madolo |

| 16 March 2013 | Free State Stars | 1–2 | Bloemfontein Celtic | Charles Mopeli Stadium |
| 15:00 | LM. Nomandela 19' | | 66' L. Lakay; 88' LL. Bacela |

| 16 March 2013 | Kaizer Chiefs | 2–0 | Polokwane City | Moses Mabhida Stadium |
| 20:30 | SA. Ngcobo 32'; K. Nkhatha 74' |

| 17 March 2013 | African Warriors | 2–2 (a.e.t.) (4–1 p) | Maluti FET College | Charles Mopeli Stadium |
| 15:00 | K. Mabuya 62'; BA. Aka 66' | | 42' MI. Rankati; 71' Mashale |
| | Penalties |
| | Penalty scored | | Penalty scored Penalty missed |

| 22 March 2013 | Temba Royals FC | 1–3 | Maritzburg United | Mthatha Stadium |
| 20:00 | S. Mofekeng 34' | | 61' MJ. Booysen; 77' D. Sheppard; 81' CL. Malajila |

=== Quarter-finals ===
| 13 April 2013 | Maritzburg United | 1–2 | Supersport United | Harry Gwala Stadium |
| | CL. Malajila 7' | | 21' GN. Maluleka; 45' M. Gabonamong | Attendance: 5,000 |

| 13 April 2013 | Bloemfontein Celtic | 0–1 | Kaizer Chiefs | Free State Stadium |
| | | | 56' L. Zvasiya | Attendance: 42,000 |

| 14 April 2013 | Mamelodi Sundowns | 1–2 | Platinum Stars | Loftus Versfeld Stadium |
| | TT. Modise 61' | | 70' T. Phala; 87' R. Ng'ambi | Attendance: 12,000 |

| 14 April 2013 | United FC | 3–2 | African Warriors | Moruleng Stadium |
| | TM. Bereng 12'; CL. Madolo 69'; SM. Shai 76' | | 47' L. Buthelezi; 79' (pen.) SD. Mokoena | Attendance: 1,500 |

=== Semi-finals ===
| 4 May 2013 | Kaizer Chiefs | 2–1 | United FC | FNB Stadium |
| | LM. Majoro 4'; G. Lebese 24' | | 80' (pen.) W. Maponyane | Attendance: 9,000 |

| 8 May 2013 | Platinum Stars | 2–3 | Supersport United | Royal Bafokeng Stadium |
| | TE. Tshabalala 24'; TM. Mthembu 90' (pen.) | | 51' K. Erasmas; 78' C. Mulenga; 105' (pen.) SW. Zuma | Attendance: 3,332 |

=== Final ===
25 May 2013
15:00

| Supersport United | 0–1 (a.e.t.) | Kaizer Chiefs |
|---|---|---|
| | Report | B. Parker 93' |

Moses Mabhida Stadium, Durban
Attendance: 60,000
