= Ange Lebahi =

Ivorian footballer

Personal information
- Full name: Ange Dahou Lebahi
- Date of birth: 20 August 1984 (age 42)
- Place of birth: Abidjan, Cote d’Ivoire
- Height: 1.85 m (6 ft 1 in)
- Positions: Centre-back; defensive midfielder

Team information
- Current team: Jomo Cosmos
- Number: 5

Senior career*
Years	Team	Apps	(Gls)
2012–2016	African Warriors	99	(12)
2016–	Jomo Cosmos	83	(4)
- * Club domestic league appearances and goals as of 14:00, 31 August 2020 (UTC)

Ange Dahou Lebahi is an Ivorian professional footballer who plays as a centre-back for National First Division club Jomo Cosmos, where he is captain.

== Club career ==
=== African Warriors ===
Lebahi made his debut for National First Division team African Warriors on 21 October 2012, starting in an away match against Black Aces. He scored his first goal for the club on 16 December 2012, helping African Warriors to a 1–1 draw against Stellenbosch.

Lebahi was promoted to club captain for the 2013–14 season. He led the Warriors during their impressive 2013-14 Nedbank Cup run, which saw them knocked out by Maritzburg United after extra time in the quarter-finals.

The 2014–15 campaign saw Lebahi's most productive season yet in terms of goal-scoring, finding the net four times and being voted the club's player of the season. He topped that goal tally in 2015–16, scoring five times, but it proved to not be enough as the Warriors were relegated at the end of the season.

=== Jomo Cosmos ===
On 20 July 2016, it was announced that Lebahi had joined newly relegated side Jomo Cosmos. He debuted for the club on 10 September in a 1–1 away draw against Black Leopards. A contractual dispute with Cape Town All Stars, whom Lebahi had reportedly signed a pre-contract with prior to joining Cosmos, kept the Ivorian out of action for over a month after his debut. A court date was set for 29 September, but no representatives from the All Stars were present, and Lebahi was made available for selection again. Lebahi was sent off after receiving a second yellow card against Thanda Royal Zulu on 27 November.

Lebahi suffered yet another setback at the start of the 2017–18 campaign, becoming ineligible to play for the first two months of the season due to an expired work permit. Cosmos managed a third-place finish in 2017–18, with Lebahi scoring once, but they missed out on promotion through the play-offs.

Lebahi was announced as the new club captain ahead of the 2018–19 season, replacing former captain Thato Lingwati who had moved to Bloemfontein Celtic. He scored a penalty in Cosmos' 4–0 victory against already-relegated Witbank Spurs on the final day of the season, a crucial result in their narrow escape from relegation.

== Career statistics ==
=== Club ===
As of 31 August 2020.

Club	Season	League			National Cup		League Cup		Continental		Other		Total	
Club	Season	Division	Apps	Goals	Apps	Goals	Apps	Goals	Apps	Goals	Apps	Goals	Apps	Goals
African Warriors	2012–13	National First Division	25	2	4	0	–		–		0	0	29	2
African Warriors	2013–14	National First Division	26	1	4	0	–		–		0	0	30	1
African Warriors	2014–15	National First Division	30	4	1	0	–		–		0	0	31	4
African Warriors	2015–16	National First Division	18	5	1	0	–		–		0	0	19	5
African Warriors	Total		99	12	10	0	0	0	0	0	0	0	109	12
Jomo Cosmos	2016–17	National First Division	15	0	2	0	–		–		0	0	17	0
Jomo Cosmos	2017–18	National First Division	18	1	1	1	–		–		4 (Note: Appearances in National First Division Play-offs)	0	23	2
Jomo Cosmos	2018–19	National First Division	24	3	3	0	–		–		0	0	27	3
Jomo Cosmos	2019–20	National First Division	26	0	2	0	–		–		0	0	28	0
Jomo Cosmos	Total		83	4	8	1	0	0	0	0	4	0	95	5
Career total			182	16	18	1	0	0	0	0	4	0	204	17
