= 2009–10 National First Division =

National First Division
- Season: 2009–10
- Champions: Vasco Da Gama
- Relegated: Ikapa Sporting; Winners Park
- Matches: 170
- Goals: 451 (2.65 per match)

2009–10 National First Division, was the season from August 2009 until February 2010, of South Africa's second tier of professional football. By the end of the season, the Coastal stream champion Vasco da Gama met to play the overall championship final, against the Inland stream champion Black Leopards. Vasco da Gama won the final, and thereby got promoted to Premier Soccer League. The subsequent playoff stage, was contested by the losing finalist, two second ranked teams of the NFD streams, and the second lowest ranked team of PSL. Winner of the playoff stage, and thereby the second promotion to PSL, was the team Mpumalanga Black Aces.

== Season structure ==
The league is made up of 16 teams, split into 2 streams. Each team plays the other 7 teams in their stream 3 times, for a total of 21 games. Teams receive 3 points for a win, 1 for draw, and 0 for a loss. At the end of the season, the top ranked team from each stream play in a two-legged final, the winner of which is crowned National First Division Champion, and gains automatic promotion to the Premier Soccer League for the next season. The loser of the final, along with the teams which came second in their streams, and the 15th placed PSL team, go into the PSL promotion play-offs. The two teams finishing in last place in their streams are automatically relegated to the Vodacom League. They are replaced by the finalists of the Vodacom League championship game.

== Clubs ==
Coastal stream		Inland stream	
Team	City	Team	City
Bay United	Port Elizabeth	African Warriors	Phuthaditjhaba
Carara Kicks	Welkom	Batau	Ermelo
FC Cape Town	Cape Town	Black Leopards	Thohoyandou
Hanover Park	Cape Town	Dynamos	Polokwane
Ikapa Sporting	Cape Town	University of Pretoria	Pretoria
Nathi Lions	Durban	United	Kimberley
Thanda Royal Zulu	Durban	Winners Park	Polokwane
Vasco da Gama	Cape Town	Witbank Spurs	Witbank

== League standings ==
=== Coastal Stream ===
Pos	Team	Pld	W	D	L	GF	GA	GD	Pts	Qualification or relegation
1	Vasco da Gama	21	11	5	5	31	20	+11	38	NFD Coastal Stream Champions 2009/2010
2	Nathi Lions	21	9	9	3	31	19	+12	36	Qualified for PSL promotion play-offs
3	Bay United	21	10	5	6	20	19	+1	35	
4	Carara Kicks	21	7	6	8	30	30	0	27	
5	Thanda Royal Zulu	21	6	9	6	29	29	0	27	
6	F.C. Cape Town	21	6	7	8	21	26	−5	25	
7	Hanover Park	21	5	5	11	18	28	−10	20	
8	Ikapa Sporting	21	4	6	11	23	32	−9	18	Relegated to the Vodacom League

=== Inland Stream ===
Pos	Team	Pld	W	D	L	GF	GA	GD	Pts	Qualification or relegation
1	Black Leopards	21	13	2	6	42	22	+20	41	NFD Inland Stream Champions 2009/2010
2	African Warriors	21	12	4	5	29	22	+7	40	Qualified for PSL promotion play-offs
3	Witbank Spurs	21	10	4	7	32	28	+4	34	
4	Batau	21	7	7	7	29	25	+4	28	
5	Dynamos	21	7	5	9	21	29	−8	26	
6	University of Pretoria	21	7	4	10	23	29	−6	25	
7	United	21	6	7	8	21	29	−8	23 (Note: 2 points deducted?)	
8	Winners Park	21	5	3	13	26	39	−13	18	Relegated to the Vodacom League

=== Postseason ===
==== NFD Final ====
Vasco da Gama and Black Leopards played a two legged tie to determine the 2009–10 NFD champion, and automatic promotion to the PSL. Vasco da Gama won the tie to become NFD champions, and were promoted to the PSL for the 2010–11 season.

Team 1	Agg.	Team 2	1st leg	2nd leg
Black Leopards (South Africa)	2–3	(South Africa) Vasco da Gama	1–1	1–2

==== Promotion playoffs ====
Black Leopards (losing finalist), Nathi Lions (2nd in coastal stream), African Warriors (2nd in inland stream), and Mpumalanga Black Aces (15th in PSL), all entered into the promotion playoffs. This playoff competition was played as a cup with two legged matches. The two semifinals were played simultaneously at 17 and 24 March, and the two legged final took place at 3 and 8 April. The two teams to qualify for the final were Black Leopards and Mpumalanga Black Aces, and after ordinary time of the two matches, the aggregate score ended at 3–3, and thus a penalty shoot out. When the first 5 ordinary shots had been completed, there was a winning score of 5–3 to Mpumalanga Black Aces, who thereby had managed to retain their PSL status.

Semifinals:

Team 1	Agg.	Team 2	1st leg	2nd leg
Black Leopards (South Africa)	6–3	(South Africa) African Warriors	4–0	2–3
Mpumalanga Black Aces (South Africa)	4–2	(South Africa) Nathi Lions	2–2	2–0

Promotion Play Off Final:

Team 1	Agg.	Team 2	1st leg	2nd leg
Mpumalanga Black Aces (South Africa)	3–3 (5–3 penalty)	(South Africa) Black Leopards	1–2	2 – 1
