= 2010–11 National First Division =

National First Division
- Season: 2010–11
- Champions: Jomo Cosmos
- Promoted: Black Leopards
- Relegated: Batau; Hanover Park
- Matches: 170
- Goals: 431 (2.54 per match)

2010–11 National First Division, was the season from September 2010 until May 2011, of South Africa's second tier of professional football. The overall NFD champion was promoted to the first level, known as Premier Soccer League (PSL). While the losing team of the championship final, faced a round robin playoff stage, against the second lowest ranked team of PSL and the two second ranked teams of the NFD streams.

== Season structure ==
The league is made up of 16 teams, split into 2 streams. Each team plays the other 7 teams in their stream 3 times, for a total of 21 games. Teams receive 3 points for a win, 1 for draw, and 0 for a loss. At the end of the season, the top ranked team from each stream play in a two-legged final, the winner of which is crowned National First Division Champion, and gains automatic promotion to the Premier Soccer League for the next season. The loser of the final, along with the teams which came second in their streams, and the 15th placed PSL team, go into the PSL promotion play-offs. The two teams finishing in last place in their streams are automatically relegated to the Vodacom League. They are replaced by the finalists of the Vodacom League championship game.

== Club and stadium information ==
Coastal Stream (excl. Northern Cape):

| Club | Location | Province | Stadium | Capacity |
|---|---|---|---|---|
| African Warriors | Phuthaditjhaba | Free State | Charles Mopeli Stadium | 35,000 |
| Bay United | Port Elizabeth | Eastern Cape | Gelvandale Stadium | 3,000 |
| Blackburn Rovers | East London | Eastern Cape | Buffalo City Stadium | 16,000 |
| Carara Kicks | Welkom | Free State | Goble Park | 20,000 |
| FC Cape Town | Cape Town (Parow) | Western Cape | NNK Rugby Stadium | 5,000 |
| Hanover Park | Cape Town (Wynberg) | Western Cape | Wynberg Military Base Stadium | 2,500 |
| Nathi Lions | Durban (KwaMashu) | KwaZulu-Natal | Princess Magogo Stadium | 12,000 |
| Thanda Royal Zulu | Richards Bay | KwaZulu-Natal | Richards Bay Stadium | 8,000 |

Inland Stream (incl. Northern Cape):

| Club | Location | Province | Stadium | Capacity |
|---|---|---|---|---|
| Batau | Ermelo | Mpumalanga | Stadium | |
| Black Leopards | Thohoyandou | Limpopo | Stadium | |
| Dynamos | Polokwane | Limpopo | Stadium | |
| FC AK | Johannesburg | Gauteng | Stadium | |
| Jomo Cosmos | Johannesburg | Gauteng | Stadium | |
| University of Pretoria | Pretoria | Gauteng | Stadium | |
| United | Kimberley | Northern Cape | Stadium | |
| Witbank Spurs | Witbank | Mpumalanga | Stadium | |

Location of teams in the 2010–11 National First Division.

== League standings ==
=== Coastal Stream ===
| Pos | Team | Pld | W | D | L | GF | GA | GD | Pts | Qualification or relegation |
|---|---|---|---|---|---|---|---|---|---|---|
| 1 | Bay United | 21 | 11 | 7 | 3 | 29 | 13 | +16 | 40 | NFD Coastal Stream Champions 2010/2011 |
| 2 | Thanda Royal Zulu | 21 | 12 | 3 | 6 | 38 | 27 | +11 | 39 | Qualification for PSL promotion play-offs |
| 3 | Carara Kicks | 21 | 7 | 11 | 3 | 32 | 31 | +1 | 32 | |
| 4 | African Warriors | 21 | 7 | 9 | 5 | 29 | 25 | +4 | 30 | |
| 5 | F.C. Cape Town | 21 | 4 | 11 | 6 | 23 | 20 | +3 | 23 | |
| 6 | Blackburn Rovers | 21 | 6 | 5 | 10 | 21 | 32 | −11 | 23 | |
| 7 | Nathi Lions | 21 | 3 | 9 | 9 | 27 | 31 | −4 | 18 | |
| 8 | Hanover Park | 21 | 4 | 5 | 12 | 23 | 43 | −20 | 17 | Relegation to the Vodacom League |

=== Inland Stream ===
| Pos | Team | Pld | W | D | L | GF | GA | GD | Pts | Qualification or relegation |
|---|---|---|---|---|---|---|---|---|---|---|
| 1 | Jomo Cosmos | 21 | 14 | 5 | 2 | 29 | 14 | +15 | 47 | NFD Inland Stream Champions 2010/2011 |
| 2 | Black Leopards | 21 | 11 | 5 | 5 | 33 | 21 | +12 | 38 | Qualification for PSL promotion play-offs |
| 3 | University of Pretoria | 21 | 10 | 7 | 4 | 29 | 18 | +11 | 37 (Note: Pretoria University initially won 2nd place in the Inland stream, due to a 3p penalty hitting Black Leopards, for fielding an unregistered player at one of their victories in the spring. Few days later the penalty was however reverted, as Black Leopards managed to win the appeal case. The log therefore ended to award the second place for Black Leopards.) | |
| 4 | F.C. AK | 21 | 7 | 6 | 8 | 27 | 24 | +3 | 27 | |
| 5 | Witbank Spurs | 21 | 6 | 6 | 9 | 22 | 26 | −4 | 24 | |
| 6 | Dynamos | 21 | 6 | 3 | 12 | 21 | 37 | −16 | 21 | |
| 7 | United | 21 | 6 | 5 | 10 | 17 | 24 | −7 | 20 (Note: 3 points deducted?) | |
| 8 | Batau | 21 | 4 | 3 | 14 | 31 | 45 | −14 | 15 | Relegation to the Vodacom League |

=== Postseason ===
==== NFD Final ====
The winner of the two streams, Bay United and Jomo Cosmos will meet and play a two legged tie, on 14 May and 22 May, to determine the overall 2010–11 NFD championship. The NFD champion will gain an automatic promotion to the PSL. While the looser of the NFD Final will get a second chance to promote to PSL, at the Promotion Play Offs.

| Team 1 | Agg. | Team 2 | 1st leg | 2nd leg |
|---|---|---|---|---|
| Bay United (South Africa) | 0–0 (penalty 4–5) | (South Africa) Jomo Cosmos | 0–0 report | 0–0 report |

==== Promotion playoffs ====
The losing team of the NFD Final (Bay United), together with both runner-ups of the NFD streams (Thanda Royal Zulu and Black Leopards), and finally the second lowest ranked team of PSL (Vasco da Gama), entered into the promotion playoffs. This playoff competition was played as a cup with two legged matches, with an unseeded draw to decide the fixtures. The two semifinals were scheduled to be played simultaneously at 25 and 29 May. Due to Black Leopards having qualified for the 2011 Nedbank Cup final at 28 May, the two semifinals were however rescheduled, to be played at 8 and 11 June. A two legged final with the two winning teams from the semifinal, was played on 15 and 18 June. Only the winner of the promotion playoff final was get promoted to play the next season in PSL.

Semifinals:

| Team 1 | Agg. | Team 2 | 1st leg | 2nd leg |
|---|---|---|---|---|
| Bay United (South Africa) | 4–1 | (South Africa) Thanda Royal Zulu | 0–0 report | 4–1 report |
| Vasco da Gama (South Africa) | 2–4 | (South Africa) Black Leopards | 1–1 report | 1–3 report |

Promotion playoff final:

| Team 1 | Agg. | Team 2 | 1st leg | 2nd leg |
|---|---|---|---|---|
| Bay United (South Africa) | 0–2 | (South Africa) Black Leopards | 0–0 report | 0–2 report |
