= 2008–09 National First Division =

National First Division
- Season: 2008–09
- Dates: 29 August 2008 – 2 May 2009
- Champions: Jomo Cosmos
- Promoted: Jomo Cosmos; Mpumalanga Black Aces
- Relegated: FC AK; Durban Stars
- Matches: 168
- Goals: 429 (2.55 per match)

The 2008–09 National First Division was the 13th season of the National First Division, the second tier of South African soccer, and took place between 29 August 2008 and 2 May 2009. The champions were Jomo Cosmos, who were promoted to the South African Premier Division alongside play-off victors Mpumalanga Black Aces. FC AK and Durban Stars were relegated SAFA Second Division.

== Inland stream ==
=== League table ===
Pos	Team	Pld	W	D	L	GF	GA	GD	Pts	Promotion, qualification or relegation
1	Jomo Cosmos (P)	21	8	9	4	22	13	+9	33	Qualification to Championship play-off
2	Mpumalanga Black Aces (O, P)	21	9	5	7	27	25	+2	32	Qualification to Promotion play-off
3	University of Pretoria	21	7	9	5	28	16	+12	30	
4	Winners Park	21	8	4	9	21	33	−12	28	
5	Dynamos	21	7	6	8	28	29	−1	27	
6	Black Leopards	21	6	8	7	24	25	−1	26	
7	Witbank Spurs	21	8	2	11	21	32	−11	26	
8	FC AK (R)	21	5	9	7	28	26	+2	24	Relegation to SAFA Second Division

(O) Play-off winners; (P) Promoted; (R) Relegated

== Coastal stream ==
=== League table ===
Pos	Team	Pld	W	D	L	GF	GA	GD	Pts	Promotion, qualification or relegation
1	Carara Kicks	21	12	3	6	36	22	+14	39	Qualification to Championship play-off
2	FC Cape Town	21	11	6	4	32	20	+12	39	Qualification to Promotion play-off
3	African Warriors	21	10	5	6	40	25	+15	35	
4	Ikapa Sporting	21	10	5	6	30	26	+4	35	
5	Hanover Park	21	8	3	10	28	35	−7	27	
6	Vasco da Gama	21	6	6	9	24	29	−5	24	
7	Nathi Lions	21	4	8	9	20	26	−6	20	
8	Durban Stars (R)	21	3	4	14	20	47	−27	13	Relegation to SAFA Second Division

(R) Relegated

== Championship play-off ==
7 May 2009
First leg

Carara Kicks	0–0	Jomo Cosmos

10 May 2009
Second leg

Jomo Cosmos	2–1	Carara Kicks
Gwekwerere 10', 53'		Tomanyane 8'

== Promotion play-off ==
=== Semi-finals ===
24 May 2009
First leg

Carara Kicks	1–1	Mpumalanga Black Aces

28 May 2009
Second leg

Mpumalanga Black Aces	2–1	Carara Kicks

24 May 2009
First leg

Thanda Royal Zulu	0–0	FC Cape Town

28 May 2009
Second leg

FC Cape Town	1–1	Thanda Royal Zulu

Thanda Royal Zulu win on away goals.

=== Final ===
31 May 2009
First leg

Mpumalanga Black Aces	0–0	Thanda Royal Zulu

6 June 2009
Second leg

Thanda Royal Zulu	0–3	Mpumalanga Black Aces
