= 2013–14 Nedbank Cup =

ke yona (the one)

Tournament details
- Country: South Africa
- Teams: 16 (preliminary round – 8 qualifiers); 32 (main tournament); 40 (total)

Final positions
- Champions: Orlando Pirates (8th title)
- Runners-up: Bidvest Wits

The Nedbank Cup is a South African club football (soccer) tournament. The knockout tournament, based on the English FA Cup format, was one of a weak opponent facing a stronger one. The competition was sponsored by ABSA until 2007, after which Nedbank took over sponsorship.

The winner of the 2013–14 Nedbank Cup qualified for the 2015 CAF Confederation Cup.

== Format ==
The 16 Premier Soccer League clubs, 8 National First Division teams, as well as 8 teams from the amateur ranks compete for the title. The winner also qualifies for the CAF Confederation Cup.

The teams are not seeded at any stage, and the first 16 sides drawn out of the hat receive a home-ground advantage. There are no longer any replays in the tournament, and any games which end in a draw after 90 minutes are subject to 30 minutes extra time followed by penalties if necessary.

== Results ==
=== Preliminary round ===
Preliminary round match details
Date	Home team	Score	Away team
16 December 2013	Witbank Spurs	1–0	Royal Eagles
17 December 2013	African Warriors	1–1 (a.e.t.); 4–3 pens.	Stellenbosch
18 December 2013	Black Leopards	3–0	Blackburn Rovers
18 December 2013	Ubuntu Cape Town	1–0	Baroka
18 December 2013	Tshakhuma TM	1–0	Jomo Cosmos
18 December 2013	Roses United	1–2	United
18 December 2013	Maluti FET College	2–3	Thanda Royal Zulu
18 December 2013	Santos	3–1	Chippa United

=== First round ===
First round match details
Date	Home team	Score	Away team
21 February 2014	Ajax Cape Town	0–1	Mamelodi Sundowns
22 February 2014	Thanda Royal Zulu	3–3 (a.e.t.); 1–3 pens.	Orlando Pirates
22 February 2014	Free State Stars	0–1	Witbank Spurs
22 February 2014	Platinum Stars	3–1	Great North
22 February 2014	AmaBEE	0–2	Bidvest Wits
22 February 2014	Lamontville Golden Arrows	1–0	Polokwane City
22 February 2014	University of Pretoria	0–1 (a.e.t.)	SuperSport United
22 February 2014	Moroka Swallows	4–3 (a.e.t.)	Mbombela United
22 February 2014	Maritzburg United	2–1 (a.e.t.)	Cape Town City
23 February 2014	United	0–2	AmaZulu
23 February 2014	Mainstay United	3–8	African Warriors
23 February 2014	Tshakhuma TM	1–1 (a.e.t.); 5–4 pens.	Young Tigers
23 February 2014	Black Leopards	0–1 (a.e.t.)	Kaizer Chiefs
26 February 2014	Stellenbosch University	0–8	Bloemfontein Celtic
26 February 2014	Buffalo	2–0	Ubuntu Cape Town
26 February 2014	Santos	2–1	Gamalakhe United

=== Second round ===
Second round match details
Date	Home team	Score	Away team
21 March 2014	Santos	0–2	Orlando Pirates
22 March 2014	AmaZulu	1–4	Bidvest Wits
22 March 2014	Platinum Stars	1–1 (a.e.t.); 1–3 pens.	Maritzburg United
22 March 2014	Lamontville Golden Arrows	1–4	Mamelodi Sundowns
23 March 2014	Bloemfontein Celtic	2–1	Witbank Spurs
23 March 2014	African Warriors	1–0	Tshakhuma TM
26 March 2014	Moroka Swallows	0–1	SuperSport United
26 March 2014	Kaizer Chiefs	2–1	Buffalo

=== Quarter-finals ===
Quarter-final match details
Date	Home team	Score	Away team
12 April 2014	African Warriors	1–3	Maritzburg United
12 April 2014	Kaizer Chiefs	2–0	SuperSport United
12 April 2014	Mamelodi Sundowns	1–2	Orlando Pirates
13 April 2014	Bloemfontein Celtic	1–2	Bidvest Wits

=== Semi-finals ===
3 May 2014
14:00 SAST

Bidvest Wits	2–2 (a.e.t.)	Kaizer Chiefs
Vilakazi 23' (pen.); Ngcobo 47'	Report	Mphela 37' (pen.); Malukela 54'
Penalties
	4–2

Bidvest Stadium, Johannesburg
Attendance: 5,000
Referee: Robert Smith
3 May 2014
19:15 SAST

Maritzburg United	1–2	Orlando Pirates
Mandaza 73'	Report	Booysen 52' (o.g.); Makola 60'

Harry Gwala Stadium, Pietermaritzburg
Attendance: 12,000
Referee: Daniel Bennett

=== Final ===
17 May 2014
14:00 SAST

Orlando Pirates	3–1	Bidvest Wits
Erasmus 53', 71'; Myeni 62'	Report	Shongwe 25'

Moses Mabhida Stadium, Durban
Attendance: 50,000
Referee: Zolile Mthetho
