= 2007–08 National First Division =

National First Division
- Season: 2007–08
- Dates: 28 September 2007 – 13 April 2008
- Champions: Maritzburg United
- Promoted: Maritzburg United; Bay United
- Relegated: Ga-Rankuwa United; Western Province United

The 2007–08 National First Division was the 12th season of the National First Division, the second tier of South African soccer.

Due to a lack of sponsorship, the previously national league was split into two streams, a coastal stream and an inland stream, with the winners of each meeting in a final.

The champions were Maritzburg United, who were promoted to the South African Premier Division in their first season in the second tier following relegation from the 2006–07 Premier Soccer League, alongside play-off victors Bay United. Ga-Rankuwa United and Western Province United were relegated to the SAFA Second Division.

Inland Stream champions FC AK were initially found guilty of bribery and docked 15 points, but after a protracted appeals process, the sanction was reversed, and FC AK took their place in the championship final.

After winning the league, Maritzburg coach Ian Palmer parted ways with the club.

== Inland stream ==
=== League table ===
Pos	Team	Pld	W	D	L	GF	GA	GD	Pts	Promotion, qualification or relegation
1	FC AK	21	10	7	4	21	19	+2	37	Qualification to Championship play-off
2	Dynamos	21	9	4	8	31	23	+8	31	Qualification to Promotion play-off
3	Winners Park	21	9	4	8	25	24	+1	31	
4	African Warriors	21	8	5	8	20	21	−1	29	
5	Mpumalanga Black Aces	21	7	7	7	26	23	+3	28	
6	Witbank Spurs	21	6	8	7	21	21	0	26	
7	University of Pretoria	21	6	7	8	23	27	−4	25	
8	Ga-Rankuwa United (R)	21	5	6	10	22	31	−9	21	Relegation to SAFA Second Division

(R) Relegated

== Coastal stream ==
=== League table ===
Pos	Team	Pld	W	D	L	GF	GA	GD	Pts	Promotion, qualification or relegation
1	Maritzburg United	21	14	5	2	31	13	+18	47	Qualification to Championship play-off
2	Bay United	21	14	3	4	30	10	+20	45	Qualification to Promotion play-off
3	Nathi Lions	21	8	10	3	22	13	+9	34	
4	FC Cape Town	21	6	8	7	24	24	0	26	
5	Ikapa Sporting	21	5	6	10	25	30	−5	21	
6	Durban Stars (R)	21	5	6	10	19	31	−12	21	
7	Hanover Park	21	5	4	12	22	32	−10	19	
8	Western Province United	21	2	8	11	20	40	−20	14	Relegation to SAFA Second Division

(R) Relegated

== Championship play-off ==
25 June 2008
First leg

FC AK	1–1	Maritzburg United
Khaiseb 32'		Davids 57'

29 June 2008
Second leg

Maritzburg United	2–0	FC AK
Davids 63', 74'

Harry Gwala Stadium, Maritzburg

Maritzburg United win the championship and earn promotion, FC AK go through to the promotion playoffs

== Promotion play-off ==
=== Semi-finals ===
2 July 2008
First leg

Bay United	1–0	Black Leopards

6 July 2008
Second leg

Black Leopards	1–1	Bay United

Black Leopards, who finished 15th in the 2007–08 Premier Soccer League, were relegated to the 2008–09 National First Division

2 July 2008
First leg

FC AK	0–0	Dynamos

6 July 2008
Second leg

Dynamos	1–2	FC AK

=== Final ===
9 July 2008
First leg

FC AK	0–0	Bay United

13 July 2008
Second leg

Bay United	2–1	FC AK

Bay United were promoted to the 2008–09 Premier Soccer League.
