= Buti Khoza =

South African footballer

Personal information
- Full name: Buti Alpheuse Khoza
- Date of birth: 21 May 1988 (age 38)
- Place of birth: Witbank, Mpumalanga, South Africa
- Height: 1.89 m (6 ft 2 1/2 in)
- Position: Goalkeeper

Team information
- Current team: Jomo Cosmos
- Number: 1

Youth career
- Jomo Cosmos

Senior career*
Years	Team	Apps	(Gls)
2009–2015	Jomo Cosmos	17	(0)
2016–2017	Witbank Spurs	3	(0)
2017–2019	Ubuntu Cape Town	35	(0)
2019–	Jomo Cosmos	12	(0)
- * Club domestic league appearances and goals as of 20:00, 20 August 2020 (UTC)

Buti Alpheuse Khoza (born 21 May 1988) is a South African professional soccer player who plays as a goalkeeper for Jomo Cosmos.

== Club career ==
=== Jomo Cosmos ===
Khoza made his debut for Jomo Cosmos on 13 September 2011 against AmaZulu at Makhulong Stadium. He was substituted off only five minutes into the match for Namibian goalkeeper Abisai Shanangayamwe. His only other appearance in the campaign came against Santos, in an away match which Cosmos would lose 1–0.

Cosmos were relegated at the end of the 2011–12 campaign, and Khoza would make eight appearances in their first season in the National First Division. He managed only a single clean sheet in his second season with the club, spending most of the season as an unused substitute. During the following two seasons Khoza only made seven more league appearances, before being released at the end of the 2014–15 season as Cosmos secured promotion to the Premier Soccer League.

=== Witbank Spurs ===
Khoza joined his hometown club Witbank Spurs at the start of the 2016–17 season, after spending a full season without a club. He made his debut for the club on 1 October 2016, conceding twice as Spurs lost to Royal Eagles. In his third and final match for the club, away against provincial rivals Mbombela United, Khoza gave away a penalty after bringing down Bongani Ndhlovu in the penalty area in the 28th minute. Spurs went on to lose the match 5–1.

=== Ubuntu Cape Town ===
Khoza signed for Ubuntu Cape Town halfway through the 2016–17 season, having only made four total appearances for Spurs. Immediately made the first choice goalkeeper, he debuted on 11 February 2017 against Real Kings at Sugar Ray Xulu Stadium, keeping the first of his seven clean sheets for the season.

=== Return to Jomo Cosmos ===
Khoza returned to Jomo Cosmos on 1 July 2019. His debut came on 15 September 2019 in a home match against Real Kings at Dobsonville Stadium.

== Career statistics ==
=== Club ===
As of 20 August 2020.

Club	Season	League			National Cup		League Cup		Continental		Other		Total	
Club	Season	Division	Apps	Goals	Apps	Goals	Apps	Goals	Apps	Goals	Apps	Goals	Apps	Goals
Jomo Cosmos	2011–12	Premier Soccer League	2	0	0	0	0	0	–		0	0	2	0
Jomo Cosmos	2012–13	National First Division	8	0	2	0	0	0	–		0	0	10	0
Jomo Cosmos	2013–14	National First Division	5	0	0	0	0	0	–		0	0	5	0
Jomo Cosmos	2014–15	National First Division	2	0	1	0	0	0	–		0	0	3	0
Jomo Cosmos	Total		17	0	3	0	0	0	0	0	0	0	20	0
Witbank Spurs	2016–17	National First Division	3	0	1	0	0	0	–		0	0	4	0
Ubuntu Cape Town	2016–17	National First Division	15	0	1	0	0	0	–		0	0	16	0
Ubuntu Cape Town	2017–18	National First Division	18	0	3	0	0	0	–		0	0	21	0
Ubuntu Cape Town	2018–19	National First Division	2	0	1	0	0	0	–		0	0	3	0
Ubuntu Cape Town	Total		35	0	5	0	0	0	0	0	0	0	40	0
Jomo Cosmos	2019–20	National First Division	12	0	2	0	0	0	–		0	0	14	0
Total			67	0	11	0	0	0	0	0	0	0	78	0
