= Clement Mazibuko =

South African soccer player

Personal information
- Full name: Clement Sibusiso Mazibuko
- Date of birth: 16 September 1977 (age 49)
- Place of birth: Benoni, Gauteng, South Africa
- Height: 1.74 m (5 ft 9 in)
- Position: Midfielder

Youth career
- –1998: Bush Bucks

Senior career*
Years	Team	Apps	(Gls)
1998–2003	Bush Bucks	120	(13)
2003–2007	Mamelodi Sundowns	59	(2)
2005	→ Ergotelis (loan)	9	(0)
2007–2010	Thanda Royal Zulu	45	(4)
2010–2013	Batau Ermelo	?	(?)
2013–2014	SuperSport United	3	(0)
Total		236	(19)

International career^{‡}
2001–2003	South Africa	8	(1)
- * Club domestic league appearances and goals ‡ National team caps and goals as of 23 August 2016

Clement Sibusiso Mazibuko (born 16 September 1977 in Benoni, Gauteng) is a former South African football midfielder. He spent the majority of his career representing South African clubs in domestic competitions, with a short spell in Greece. He is a former international with South Africa, having earned a total of 8 caps during 2001–2003.

== Career ==
Mazibuko started his career at Bush Bucks in 1998, where he spent 4 years before joining the Mamelodi Sundowns in 2003. He briefly joined struggling Greek Super League side Ergotelis on loan in 2005, returning to the Mamelodi Sundowns later that year to help them win the South African Premier Division twice, in the 2005–06 and 2006–07 seasons. Mazibuko then moved to newly promoted Thanda Royal Zulu in 2007, and followed them to the National First Division after the club was relegated at the end of the season. He joined fellow National First Division competitors Batau in 2010 to drop to the Second Division as the club was relegated at the end of the 2010–11 season.

Mazibuko returned to top-flight in 2013 signing with South African Premier Division side SuperSport United for the 2013–14 Premier Division season. He then retired in 2014, at age 36.

== International ==
Mazibuko made a dream debut for South Africa, coming in as a substitute on the 88th minute and scoring his first international goal within 60 seconds on 29 April 2001, during the 1st round of the 2001 COSAFA Cup vs. Mozambique.

=== International goals ===
#	Date	Venue	Opponent	Score	Result	Competition
1.	29 April 2001	Estádio do Maxaquene, Maputo	Mozambique	0–3	0–3	COSAFA Cup 1st Round

== Honours ==
=== Club ===
Mamelodi Sundowns F.C.

- South African Premier Division: 2005–06, 2006–07
