= Fadlu Davids =

South African footballer

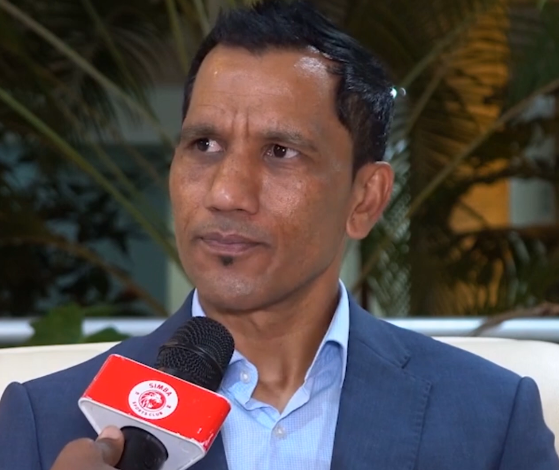
- Fadlu Davids in 2025

Personal information
- Full name: Fadluraghman Davids
- Date of birth: 21 May 1981 (age 45)
- Place of birth: Cape Town, South Africa
- Height: 1.78 m (5 ft 10 in)
- Position: Forward

Team information
- Current team: Young Africans (head coach)

Youth career
- 1995–1997: Ajax Cape Town
- 1997–1998: Saxon Rovers

Senior career*
Years	Team	Apps	(Gls)
1999–2000	Mother City		
2000–2001	Chernomorets Burgas		
2001–2003	Manning Rangers		
2003–2004	Avendale Athletico		
2004–2005	Vasco da Gama		
2005–2006	Silver Stars	6	(0)
2007–2012	Maritzburg United	85	(18)
Total		91+	(18+)

International career
1998	South Africa U17		

Managerial career
- 2012–2014: Maritzburg United (assistant coach)
- 2014: Bloemfontein Celtic (assistant coach)
- 2015: Chippa United (assistant coach)
- 2015–2017: Maritzburg United (assistant coach)
- 2017–2018: Maritzburg United
- 2019–2022: Orlando Pirates (assistant coach)
- 2022: FC Lokomotiv Moscow (assistant coach)
- 2022–2023: Maritzburg United
- 2023–2024: Raja CA (assistant coach)
- 2024–2025: Simba S.C.
- 2025–: Raja CA
- * Club domestic league appearances and goals

Fadluraghman "Fadlu" Davids (born 21 May 1981 in Cape Town, Western Cape) is a South African football manager and former player. He is the currently head coach of Tanzanian club Young Africans.

He spent much of his playing career in the South Africa, most notably with Maritzburg United, where he led them to a National First Division title. After retiring, Davids began his coaching career with Maritzburg as an assistant. In 2017, he was appointed as head coach and let them to their highest ever Premier Soccer League finish and a domestic cup final. Davids went on to serve as assistant coach at Orlando Pirates before heading to Lokomotiv Moscow.

In 2024, he was Josef Zinnbauer's assistant when Raja CA achieved the invincible domestic double, before heading to Tanzania to take charge of Simba SC where he led them to the CAF Confederation Cup final. In 2025, he returned to Raja CA as head coach.

== Playing career ==
Fadlu Davids grew up in Athlone, Cape Town, where he began playing football at a young age. He joined Cape Town Spurs at under-15 and under-17 levels before moving to Saxon Rovers, where he played senior football as a 16-year-old. He also represented the South African U17 national team during this period.

At the age of 17, Davids attended trials with English clubs Fulham FC and West Ham United, training with their youth and reserve sides. Unable to secure a work permit, he returned to South Africa and played for six months with Mother City, though the club was relegated. He signed a three-year deal with the Bulgarian club Chernomorets Burgas and left after one season. "The club ran into financial difficulties which saw the foreign players not being paid" said Davids.

Again, it was back to South Africa to join Manning Rangers, playing under Clive Barker for one-and-a-half seasons. A groin injury saw him depart Rangers and he played National First Division football for Avendale Athletico and then Vasco Da Gama, where he was top goal scorer and player of the year in his tenure at the club. Silver Stars, which became Platinum Stars, was next on Davids' schedule where he stayed for one-and-a-half seasons, helping the side secure the Telkom Cup.

In December 2006, he signed for Maritzburg United, who were battling relegation in the South African Premiership. Although the team was relegated, Davids contributed to their promotion the following season. On 28 June 2008, he scored a brace in the second leg of the play-off final against FC AK to win the 2007–08 National First Division title. He also finished top goalscorer of the season.

He remained at Maritzburg until his retirement in January 2012, serving as captain for two seasons. Persistent ankle injuries forced him to retire from professional football at the age of 31. His coach Ernst Middendorp immediately offered him to become his assistant. After a few days, Fadlu accepted. He played his last career match on 4 December 2011 against AmaZulu FC.

== Managerial career ==
=== Maritzburg United ===
Upon his retirement in January 2012, Davids served as assistant coach to Ernst Middendorp at Maritzburg United. He moved with him to Bloemfontein Celtic when Steve Komphela arrived at United in 2014. After one-and-a-half years, he followed Ernst to Chippa United again for six months.

When Middendorp left Martizburg United in 2016, Davids was named interim coach for a third time in his career. His brother, Maahier Davids, was named as his assistant.

Upon the arrival of Roger De Sá, Davids resumed his position as Maritzburg's assistant coach. However, only seven games later, he reclaimed his position as interim coach after De Sá's resignation. Davids was caretaker for the rest of the 2016–17 South African Premier Division. On 1 July, Maritzburg United announced that Fadlu Davids would be the permanent coach after a very good performance as caretaker; he was in charge for the final nine games of the season, winning four, drawing three and losing two.

Davids first full season as a coach was a success; United were only four points away from securing a spot in the 2018–19 CAF Confederation Cup and they also lost the 2017–18 Nedbank Cup final against Free State Stars, which was their last chance to qualify for the CAF tournament. In the 2018–19 season, Davids team played 15 league games and only won once, and on 24 December, Davids was sacked. He gained a reputation for promoting younger players after creating first team opportunities for the likes of Siphesihle Ndlovu‚ Bandile Shandu and Mlondi Dlamini, all of whom started out as ball boys.

=== Zinnbauer assistant ===
Davids returned to be an assistant coach, this time for Orlando Pirates, and has been in that position since 15 January 2019 before leaving to join Josef Zinnbauer as his assistant in Russian side Lokomotiv moscow.

On 8 June 2023, Raja CA appointed him as Zinnbauer's assistant starting from the end of the 2022–23 season until June 2025. Raja became the first Moroccan club in history to win the Botola undefeated. In addition, he achieved the domestic double, following a 2–1 victory over AS FAR in the Throne Cup final.

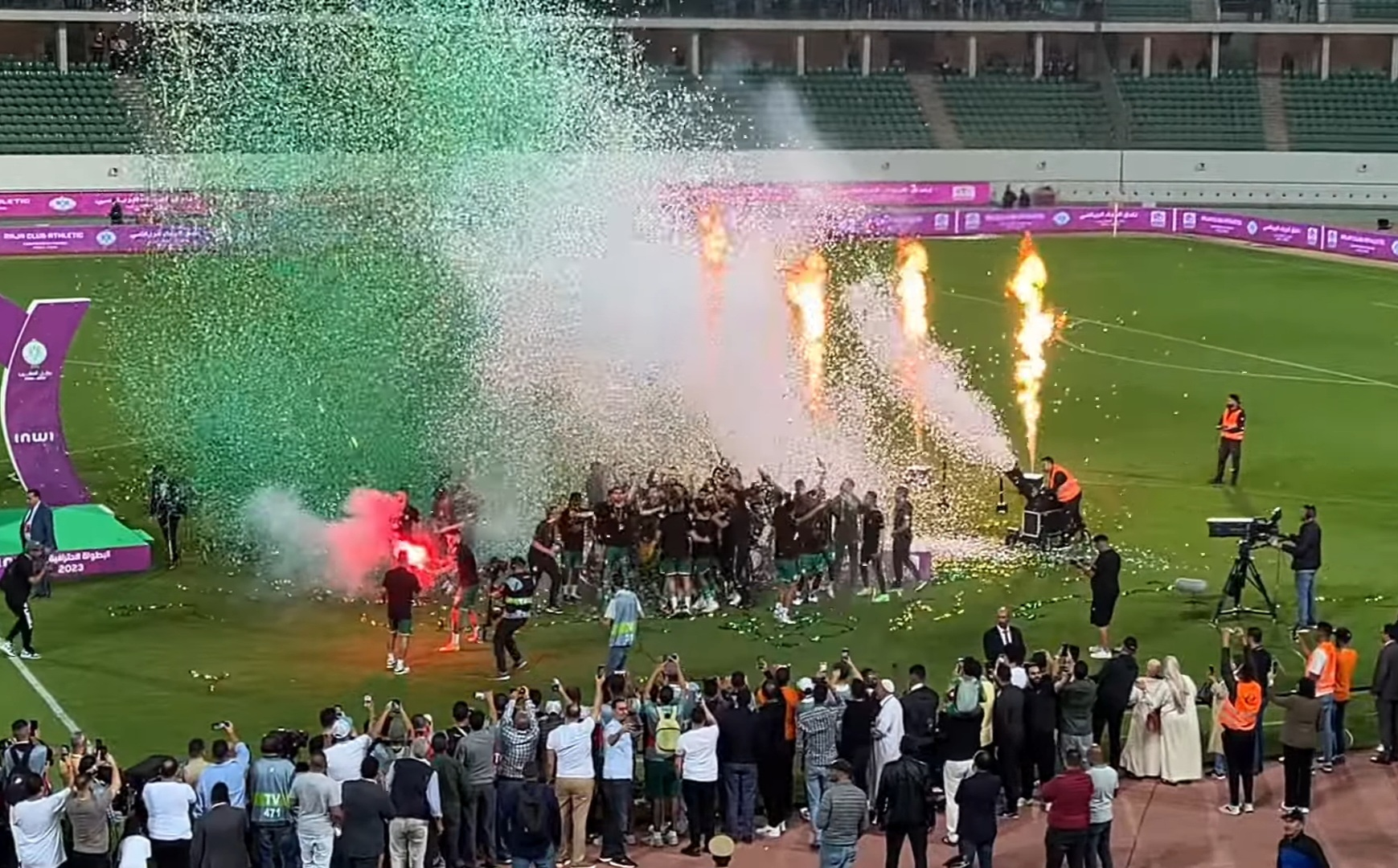
Raja players celebrating the first unbeaten title in Botola history

=== Simba ===
On 5 July 2024 he was announced as the head coach of Tanzanian Premier League side Simba.

In the 2024–25 season, Fadlu Davids led Simba SC to a strong campaign in both domestic and continental competitions. They finished runners-up of the 2024–25 Tanzanian Premier League with 78 points, four behind Young Africans, after recording 25 wins, 3 draws, and 2 defeats. In the 2024-25 CAF Confederation Cup, Simba reached the final but were defeated by RS Berkane.

=== Raja CA ===
On 22 September 2025, Raja CA announced the return of Fadlu Davids as head coach. Simba wanted to retain the coach, but the lure of returning to Morocco was seemingly too hard to refuse for Davids and his crew after Raja parted ways with Lassaad Chabbi. He became the first-ever South African coach in the history of the club.

=== Young Africans ===
On 7 November, he was appointed as Young Africans head coach.

== Coaching statistics ==
As of 7 November 2026

Team	From	To	Record					
Team	From	To	G	W	D	L	Win %	Ref.
Maritzburg United	23 March 2017	24 December 2018	65	22	23	20	33.85	
Orlando Pirates	16 April 2022	25 April 2022	2	1	0	1	50.00	
Maritzburg United	14 November 2022	30 June 2023	22	7	5	10	31.82	
Simba SC	5 July 2024	21 September 2025	51	37	6	8	72.55	
Raja CA	22 September 2025	7 November 2026	1	1	0	0	100.00	
Young Africans	7 November 2026	Present	0	0	0	0	—	
Total			141	68	34	39	48.23	—

== Honours ==
=== Player ===
Maritzburg United

- National First Division: 2007–08

Silver Stars

- Telkom Knockout: 2006

=== Assistant Manager ===
Orlando Pirates

- MTN 8: 2020

Raja CA

- Botola Pro: 2023–24
- Moroccan Throne Cup: 2023–24; runner-up: 2022–23

=== Manager ===
Maritzburg United

- Nedbank Cup runner-up: 2017–18

Simba

- Tanzanian Premier League runner-up: 2024–25
- CAF Confederation Cup runner-up: 2024–25
