= 2016–17 National First Division =

National First Division
- Season: 2016–17
- Champions: Thanda Royal Zulu
- Promoted: AmaZulu
- Relegated: Santos; Magezi
- Matches: 240
- Goals: 610 (2.54 per match)

The 2016–17 National First Division was the season from August 2016 to May 2017 of South Africa's second tier of professional soccer, the National First Division.

== League table ==
Pos	Team	Pld	W	D	L	GF	GA	GD	Pts	Promotion, qualification or relegation
1	Thanda Royal Zulu (Note: At the end of the season, Thanda Royal Zulu was extinguished and replaced with a newly formed club Richards Bay F.C.) (C)	30	17	11	2	52	24	+28	62	
2	Black Leopards (Q)	30	14	8	8	44	37	+7	50	Qualification to Promotion play-offs
3	Stellenbosch F.C. (Note: Vasco da Gama was re-worked as Stellenbosch F.C. prior to the beginning of the season.) (Q)	30	14	7	9	39	29	+10	49	Qualification to Promotion play-offs
4	Royal Eagles	30	13	9	8	52	37	+15	48	
5	AmaZulu (Note: Amazulu's owner purchased Thanda Royal Zulu's league status upon completion of the season. Amazulu were effectively promoted.) (P)	30	14	5	11	52	37	+15	47	Promotion to 2017–18 South African Premier Division
6	Mbombela United	30	12	8	10	43	30	+13	44	
7	Witbank Spurs	30	12	8	10	40	39	+1	44	
8	Mthatha Bucks	30	10	13	7	39	36	+3	43	
9	Cape Town All Stars	30	9	11	10	27	29	−2	38	
10	Jomo Cosmos	30	10	8	12	33	36	−3	38	
11	Real Kings F.C.	30	9	9	12	36	40	−4	36	
12	University of Pretoria	30	10	6	14	32	42	−10	36	
13	F.C. Cape Town	30	8	10	12	35	49	−14	34	
14	Milano United A.F.C.	30	10	2	18	36	59	−23	32	
15	Magesi F.C. (R)	30	8	7	15	34	46	−12	31	Relegation to 2017–18 SAFA Second Division
16	Santos (R)	30	4	10	16	16	40	−24	22	Relegation to 2017–18 SAFA Second Division

Source: http://www.psl.co.za/log.asp?id=879
Rules for classification: 1) Points; 2) Goal difference; 3) Number of goals scored;
(C) Champions; (P) Promoted; (Q) Qualified for the phase indicated; (R) Relegated

== Play-offs ==
Pos	Lge	Team	Pld	W	D	L	GF	GA	GD	Pts	Qualification
1	PRE	Baroka (P)	4	2	2	0	7	4	+3	8	Promotion to 2017–18 South African Premier Division
2	NFD	Black Leopards	4	1	2	1	5	4	+1	5	
3	NFD	Stellenbosch F.C.	4	0	2	2	3	7	−4	2	

Source: http://www.psl.co.za/log.asp?id=879
Rules for classification: 1) Points; 2) Goal difference; 3) Number of goals scored;
(P) Promoted
31 May 2017

Stellenbosch	2–2	Baroka
	Report

3 June 2017

Black Leopards	0–0	Stellenbosch
	Report

7 June 2017

Baroka	2–1	Black Leopards
	Report

10 June 2017

Baroka	2–0	Stellenbosch
	Report

14 June 2017

Stellenbosch	1–3	Black Leopards
	Report

17 June 2017

Black Leopards	1–1	Baroka
	Report

== See also ==
- 2016-17 South African Premier Division
- 2016-17 Nedbank Cup
