= UMlalazi Local Municipality =

Coordinates: 28°53′03″S 31°28′08″E

uMlalazi
- Local municipality
- Seal

- Location in KwaZulu-Natal
- Country: South Africa
- Province: KwaZulu-Natal
- District: King Cetshwayo
- Seat: Eshowe
- Wards: 28

Government
  - Type: Municipal council

Area
  - Total: 2,214 km^{2} (855 sq mi)

Population (2016)
  - Total: 223,140
  - Density: 100.8/km^{2} (261.0/sq mi)

Racial makeup (2011)
  - Black African: 97.1%
  - Coloured: 0.6%
  - Indian/Asian: 0.7%
  - White: 1.5%

First languages (2011)
  - Zulu: 92.1%
  - English: 3.5%
  - Southern Ndebele: 1.3%
  - Other: 3.1%
- Time zone: UTC+2 (SAST)
- Municipal code: KZN284

uMlalazi Local Municipality is an administrative area in the King Cetshwayo District of KwaZulu-Natal in South Africa. The municipality is named after the uMlalazi River.

== Main places ==
The 2001 census divided the municipality into the following main places:

Place	Code	Area (km^{2})	Population
Amatikulu	54001	1.38	732
Bangindoda	54002	126.37	7,112
Bhekabelungu Biyela	54003	7.32	923
Bhekeshowe	54004	79.53	11,789
Dinuzulu	54005	1.44	6,374
Emangidini	54006	6.86	648
Entembeni	54007	7.15	477
Eshowe	54008	16.33	5,230
Gingindlovu	54009	2.29	1,157
Khoza	54010	69.39	11,387
Kolweni	54011	19.38	3,583
KwaMondi	54012	20.46	6,651
Mombeni	54013	138.88	10,829
Mpungose	54014	173.38	26,955
Mpushini Park	54015	2.72	327
Mtunzini	54016	10.59	1,273
Mvuzane	54017	91.28	9,935
Mxhwanazi	54018	2.72	760
Mzimela	54019	241.85	29,731
Ndlangubo	54020	48.67	9,013
Ntuli	54021	329.56	22,189
Nzuza	54022	85.39	21,363
Sabeka	54023	5.99	212
Shange	54024	109.20	13,476
Sikhonyane	54025	14.29	1,231
Umgoye Forest	54026	39.02	6
Vuma	54028	7.85	0
Zulu	54029	14.62	5,710
Remainder of the municipality	54027	540.21	12,007

== Politics ==
The municipal council consists of fifty-five members elected by mixed-member proportional representation. Twenty-eight councillors are elected by first-past-the-post voting in twenty-eight wards, while the remaining twenty-seven are chosen from party lists so that the total number of party representatives is proportional to the number of votes received.

In the election of 4 November 2026 the Inkatha Freedom Party (IFP) lost its majority, but remains the largest party on the council, with 24 seats.

The following table shows the results of the election.

Party	Ward			List			Total seats
Party	Votes	%	Seats	Votes	%	Seats	Total seats
Inkatha Freedom Party	26,422	42.66	15	26,344	42.64	9	24
uMkhonto weSizwe Party	23,499	37.94	13	23,871	38.63	8	21
African National Congress	6,863	11.08	0	6,786	10.98	6	6
Democratic Alliance	1,785	2.88	0	1,864	3.02	2	2
Ubuntu Abande Political Party	907	1.46	0	865	1.40	1	1
Economic Freedom Fighters	703	1.14	0	711	1.15	1	1
Independent candidates	407	0.66	0				0
12 other parties	1,350	2.18	0	1,347	2.18	0	0
Total	61,936	100.00	28	61,788	100.00	27	55
Valid votes	61,936	98.57		61,788	98.59		
Invalid/blank votes	898	1.43		885	1.41		
Total votes	62,834	100.00		62,673	100.00		
Registered voters/turnout	118,373	53.08		118,373	52.95		
