= Nkosinathi =

Nkosinathi is a masculine given name found in South Africa. Notable people with this name include:

== Politicians ==
- Nkosinathi Benson Fihla (born 1932), in South Africa's National Assembly
- Nkosinathi Dlamini, a South African MP for the African National Congress
- Nkosinathi Nhleko (born 1964), a South African minister in the second cabinet of Jacob Zuma
- Nkosinathi Nxumalo, in South Africa's National Assembly

== Soccer ==
- Nkosinathi Mthiyane (born 1988), a South African midfielder for several teams
- Nkosinathi Nhleko (footballer) (born 1979), a South African striker for Kaizer Chefs
- Nkosinathi Ogle (born 1990), a South African midfielder and striker for Moroka Swallows
- Nkosinathi Ngema, a South African player for Thanda Royal Zulu
- Nkosinathi Sibisi (born 1995), a South African defender for the Orlando Pirates

== Other ==
- Nkosinathi Innocent Maphumulo (born 1976), a South African musician
- Nkosinathi Joyi (born 1983), a South African boxer
- Nkosinathi Ndwandwe (born 1959), a South African Anglican bishop
