= 2014–15 SAFA Second Division =

SAFA Second Division
- Season: 2014–15
- Champions: Mbombela United
- Promoted: Mbombela United; Mthatha Bucks

The 2014–15 SAFA Second Division (known as the ABC Motsepe League for sponsorship reasons) was the 17th season of the SAFA Second Division, the third tier league for South African association football clubs, since its establishment in 1998. Due to the size of South Africa, the competition was split into nine divisions, one for each region. After the league stage of the regional competition was completed, the nine teams were placed into two 'streams', sometimes referred to as the Inland and Coastal streams.

It was won by Mbombela United, who beat Mthatha Bucks 2–1 in the playoff final. Both teams were promoted to the 2015–16 National First Division.
