= Komane =

Komane is a South African surname. Notable people with the surname include:

- Rosina Komane, South African politician;
- Lencel Komane (born 1972), South African politician;
- Boikanyo Komane (born 1992), South African soccer player.
