= Khotso Malope =

South African soccer player

Personal information
- Full name: Khotso Benny Malope
- Date of birth: 18 June 1994 (age 32)
- Place of birth: Benoni, South Africa
- Height: 1.62 m (5 ft 4 in)
- Position: Midfielder

Team information
- Current team: Richards Bay

Youth career
- –2015: Kaizer Chiefs

Senior career*
Years	Team	Apps	(Gls)
2015–2019	Kaizer Chiefs	5	(1)
2015–2016	→ Moroka Swallows (loan)	10	(3)
2016–2017	→ Thanda Royal Zulu (loan)	22	(3)
2019–	Richards Bay	13	(0)
- * Club domestic league appearances and goals as of 16:55, 9 July 2020 (UTC)

Khotso Benny Malope (born 18 June 1994) is a South African soccer player who plays as a midfielder for Kruger United Fc.

== Career ==
Malope was born in Benoni, Gauteng.

He spent the 2015–16 season at Moroka Swallows, before spending the 2016–17 season again on loan, this time at Thanda Royal Zulu. Malope made his debut for the club in September 2017, and he scored his first goal of the 2018–19 season for Chiefs in August 2018 against Bloemfontein Celtic as the club drew 2–2, but left the club shortly before the end of the 2018–19 season.

He joined Richards Bay in the summer of 2019.
