= Boikanyo =

Boikanyo may refer to:

- Boikanyo Komane (born 1992), South African soccer player
- Boikanyo Raymond Elisha, South African politician
- Boikanyo Solar Power Station, solar power plant in South Africa
