= 2015–16 National First Division =

National First Division
- Season: 2015–16
- Champions: Baroka
- Promoted: Baroka; Highlands Park
- Relegated: African Warriors; Moroka Swallows
- Matches: 240
- Goals: 563 (2.35 per match)

The 2015–16 National First Division is the second-tier league in South Africa. The competition began on 22 August 2015. It was won by Baroka.

== League table ==
Pos	Team	Pld	W	D	L	GF	GA	GD	Pts	Promotion, qualification or relegation
1	Baroka (C, P)	30	17	9	4	50	23	+27	60	Promotion to 2016–17 South African Premier Division
2	Highlands Park (Q)	30	17	8	5	43	18	+25	59	Qualification to Promotion play-offs
3	Mbombela United (Q)	30	15	11	4	42	23	+19	56	Qualification to Promotion play-offs
4	Witbank Spurs F.C.	30	16	5	9	47	34	+13	53	
5	Royal Eagles	30	15	7	8	48	32	+16	52	
6	Milano United	30	16	3	11	37	23	+14	51	
7	Cape Town All Stars	30	13	6	11	30	32	−2	45	
8	Black Leopards	30	11	7	12	32	30	+2	40	
9	AmaZulu	30	9	9	12	34	32	+2	36	
10	Cape Town	30	9	6	15	33	50	−17	33	
11	Santos	30	7	10	13	32	43	−11	31	
12	Mthatha Bucks	30	6	12	12	24	34	−10	30	
13	Vasco da Gama	30	7	9	14	27	41	−14	30	
14	Thanda Royal Zulu	30	6	12	12	33	50	−17	30	
15	African Warriors (R)	30	6	7	17	25	44	−19	25	Relegation to 2016–17 SAFA Second Division
16	Moroka Swallows (R)	30	5	9	16	26	54	−28	24	Relegation to 2016–17 SAFA Second Division

Source: http://www.psl.co.za/log.asp?id=879
Rules for classification: 1) Points; 2) Goal difference; 3) Number of goals scored;
(C) Champions; (P) Promoted; (Q) Qualified for the phase indicated; (R) Relegated

== Play-offs ==
Pos	Lge	Team	Pld	W	D	L	GF	GA	GD	Pts	Promotion
1	NFD	Highlands Park (P)	4	3	1	0	6	0	+6	10	Promotion to 2016–17 South African Premier Division
2	NFD	Mbombela United	4	2	0	2	3	6	−3	6	
3	PRE	University of Pretoria	4	0	1	3	1	4	−3	1	

Updated to match(es) played on 18 June 2016. Source: soccerway.com
(P) Promoted
25 May 2016
3 p.m.

Mbombela United	0–3	Highlands Park
		6' Isaacs; 66', 76' Mvala

KaNyamazane Stadium

29 May 2016
3 p.m.

University of Pretoria	0–1	Mbombela United
		39' Gumede

ABSA Tuks Stadium

11 June 2016
3 p.m.

Highlands Park	1–0	University of Pretoria
Garcia 52'

Makhulong Stadium

15 June 2016
3 p.m.

Highlands Park	2–0	Mbombela United
Shalulile 12', 82'

Makhulong Stadium

18 June 2016
3 p.m.

Mbombela United	2–1	University of Pretoria
Sekome 3'; Patjie 84'		82' Kebede

KaNyamazane Stadium

22 June 2016
3 p.m.

University of Pretoria	0–0	Highlands Park

ABSA Tuks Stadium

== Attendances ==
Team	Stadium	Capacity	Average	Highest	Lowest
Black Leopards	Thohoyandou stadium	20 000	565	5000	124
Amazulu	King goodwill Zwelith	10 000	500	500	500
Mthatha Bucks	Mthatha stadium	6 200	322	1000	100
Highlands Park	Makhulong stadium	20 000	322	2000	125
Baroka	Pietersburg stadium	15 000	319	1000	125
Mbombela United	KaNyamazane stadium	15 000	267	1000	100
Moroka Swallows	Volkswagen Dobsonville	24 000	223	500	100
Royal Eagles	Harry Gwala stadium	22 000	214	500	100
Cape Town All Stars	Athlone Stadium	34 000	203	500	100
African Warriors	Charles Mopelli stadium	50 000	187	500	100
Thanda Royal Zulu	Richards Boy Sports Stadium	8 000	185	250	100
Santos	Athlone Stadium	34 000	177	300	100
Milano United	Blue Downs Stadium	3 000	175	200	125
Vasco da Gama	Parow Park stadium	3 000	167	300	100
Witbank Spurs	Themba Sinamela stadium	1 000	167	200	100
FC Cape Town	NNK Rugby Stadium	5 000	157	200	100

== See also ==
- 2015-16 South African Premier Division
- 2015-16 Nedbank Cup
