= Boikanyo Komane =

South African soccer player

Personal information
- Full name: Boikanyo Ramathlakwane Komane
- Date of birth: 28 November 1992 (age 33)
- Position: Defensive midfielder

Team information
- Current team: Richards Bay
- Number: 44

Senior career*
Years	Team	Apps	(Gls)
2012–2014	United	20	(0)
2014–2016	Royal Eagles	30	(2)
2016–2017	Thanda Royal Zulu	40	(8)
2017–2018	Royal Eagles	21	(6)
2018–2020	Chippa United	51	(1)
2020–2022	Golden Arrows	1	(0)
2022–2023	All Stars	29	(0)
2023–	Richards Bay	17	(2)
- * Club domestic league appearances and goals as of 8 April 2024

Boikanyo Ramathlakwane Komane (born 28 November 1992) is a South African soccer player who plays as a defensive midfielder for Richards Bay in the Premier Soccer League.

Following stints at United and Royal Eagles, he spent one and a half season in Thanda Royal Zulu. In 2017, Thanda Royal Zulu sold their league license to AmaZulu and wrapped up their operation. Both Royal Eagles and Richards Bay claimed to sign the player. A DRC tribunal ruled in favour of Royal Eagles.

Komane went on to Chippa United in 2018 and was a regular in the 2018–19 and 2019–20 South African Premier Division. Sports magazine wrote about Komane as a possible replacement for Kaizer Chiefs's Willard Katsande or SuperSport United's Dean Furman. However, he went to the Lamontville Golden Arrows and only played one match during a two-year stay. A good year in the First Division with All Stars earned him a move back to the Premier Division in summer 2023, signing for Richards Bay.
