= Bissong =

Bissong is a surname. Notable people with the surname include:

- Omotu Bissong, Nigerian model, television presenter, and actress
- Clement Bissong (born 1983), Nigerian footballer
