= 2012–13 National First Division =

National First Division
- Season: 2012–13
- Champions: Polokwane City
- Promoted: Mpumalanga Black Aces
- Relegated: F.C. AK; Dynamos
- Matches: 442
- Goals: 543 (1.23 per match)
- Top goalscorer: Lesvin Stoffels and Nkosinathi Mthiyane (14)

The 2012–13 National First Division was played from September 2012 until May 2013, and is the second tier of South Africa's professional football. Polokwane City won the league, earning promotion to the 2013–14 Premiership. Santos and Mpumalanga Black Aces finished second and third respectively, qualifying for the 2012–13 PSL Playoff Tournament, which Mpumalanga Black Aces won, also earning them promotion to the 2013–14 Premiership.

Clubs played a varying number of games over the course of the season due to a number of boycotts which took place at the beginning of the season.

The results faced legal disputes by Thanda Royal Zulu and Chippa United which were eventually dismissed, and the trophy was only handed to Polokwane City at the start of the following season.

== League table ==
Pos	Team	Pld	W	D	L	GF	GA	GD	Pts	Promotion or relegation
1	Polokwane City (C, P)	30	14	7	9	45	33	+12	49	Promotion to 2013–14 Premiership
2	Santos	29	13	10	6	38	30	+8	49	Qualification to 2012–13 PSL Playoff Tournament
3	Mpumalanga Black Aces (P)	27	13	9	5	32	22	+10	48	Qualification to 2012–13 PSL Playoff Tournament
4	Thanda Royal Zulu	27	13	8	6	40	28	+12	47	
5	Witbank Spurs	27	11	9	7	45	37	+8	42	
6	Milano United	28	11	9	8	35	28	+7	42	
7	African Warriors	29	11	9	9	38	41	−3	42	
8	United FC	28	10	11	7	34	28	+6	41	
9	Vasco da Gama	26	11	7	8	35	27	+8	40	
10	FC Cape Town	27	9	8	10	31	32	−1	35	
11	Blackburn Rovers	26	7	11	8	31	35	−4	32	
12	Roses United	28	8	6	14	32	37	−5	30	
13	Sivutsa Stars	26	7	8	11	37	40	−3	29	
14	Jomo Cosmos	27	6	10	11	29	34	−5	28	
15	FC AK (R)	27	4	9	14	24	47	−23	21	Relegation to SAFA Second Division
16	Dynamos F.C. (R)	30	2	11	17	17	44	−27	17	Relegation to SAFA Second Division

(C) Champions; (P) Promoted; (R) Relegated

== Promotion play-offs ==
Pos	Lge	Team	Pld	W	D	L	GF	GA	GD	Pts	Qualification
1	NFD	Mpumalanga Black Aces (P)	4	2	2	0	4	2	+2	8	Qualification for 2013–14 South African Premier Division
2	PRE	Chippa United (R)	4	1	2	1	1	1	0	5	
3	NFD	Santos	4	0	2	2	2	4	−2	2	

Source: RSSSF
Rules for classification: 1) Points; 2) Goal difference; 3) Number of goals scored;
(P) Promoted; (R) Relegated

National First Division promotion play-off results
Date	Team 1	Result F–A	Team 2
29 May 2013	Chippa United	0–0	Santos
1 June 2013	Mpumalanga Black Aces	1–0	Chippa United
20 June 2013	Santos	1–2	Mpumalanga Black Aces
23 June 2013	Santos	0–1	Chippa United
26 June 2013	Chippa United	0–0	Mpumalanga Black Aces
29 June 2013	Mpumalanga Black Aces	1–1	Santos
