= List of South African soccer transfers 2009–10 =

This is a list of South African football transfers for the 2009–10 season.

== Clubs ==
=== AmaZulu ===
In:
(Argentina) Nick Gindre - AFC Wimbledon
(South Africa) Warren Bishop - Pretoria University

Out:
(South Africa) Sean Dundee
(South Africa) Nhlakanipho Mkhize
(South Africa) Bonga Mogale
(Democratic Republic of the Congo) Momikia Yemo
(South Africa) Sanele Majola
