= Bay United F.C. =

Defunct South African soccer club

Bay United
- Full name: Bay United Football Club
- Nickname: Watsh’Umlilo (The fire is burning)
- Founded: 2006
- Dissolved: 2012
- Ground: Old Peter Mokaba Stadium, Polokwane
- Capacity: 15,000
- League: National First Division
- 2011–12: National First Division, 10th
Home colours	Away colours

Bay United was a South African professional football (soccer) club based first in the city of Port Elizabeth and later Polokwane. It played in the Premiership and National First Division.

The club came into existence in 2006 when the franchise of struggling National First Division club Maritzburg United was purchased and relocated to Port Elizabeth. The club also purchased the Vodacom League franchise of the NMMU F.C. The club spent one season in the Premiership, and the other years of its existence in the National First Division (NFD).

Following the 2010–11 NFD season, the club's NFD franchise was moved to Polokwane, Limpopo. It played the 2011–12 season under the name Bay United. In 2012, it became Polokwane City. The Vodacom League team became Bay Stars.

== Ownership ==
The club was owned by Volkswagen South Africa during the 2006–07 NFD season. After the 2006–07 season Sipho Pityana purchased the club through his company, Izingwe Holdings and VW became the team's main sponsor.

The club's future was unknown during the 2010 off season as owner Sipho Pityana had said that the club would cease conducting business, while attempting to sell the club.

The main reason given for selling the club were, a lack of funds, stemming from the teams demotion from the Premiership at the end of the 2008–09 season. The reduction in income due to playing in the NFD, as well as a fine for releasing players seem to be the main causes for the club's problems. Pityana had said that he would however be willing to sell the club, should a buyer come forward.

The league franchise was eventually sold to Striving Mind Trading 522 CC, a Limpopo based company, headed by Julia Mogaladi. She is the niece of John Mogaladi, chairman of the Limpopo-based football club, Winners Park. They announced that the team would be moved to Limpopo, but it remained in Port Elizabeth for the 2010–11 season.

In August 2012, the Premier Soccer League approved of the renaming of the franchise to Polokwane City.

== Home stadium ==
When the club was first formed, it played its matches at the Wolfson Stadium, in KwaZakhele, Port Elizabeth. Following the 2007–08 NFD season, and the club's promotion to the Premiership, the stadium was deemed below league standards. The team then moved its home matches to the EPRU Stadium in Port Elizabeth for the 2008–09 season. The team shared the stadium with Eastern Province rugby team. During the season, the team also hosted some matches at East London's Buffalo City Stadium.

The team was relegated at the end of the 2008–09 Premiership season, and then moved its home matches to the smaller Westbourne Oval. During the 2009–10 National First Division season, the team experienced scheduling issues, and was forced to also host matches at NMMU's Xerox Stadium, and the EPRU Stadium.

During the 2010–11 National First Division season the team began by hosting its matches at the Westbourne Oval, but later shifted to hosting its matches at the Gelvandale Stadium.

The youth team played its home matches at the NU2 Stadium.

After moving to Limpopo, the club played at Old Peter Mokaba Stadium, University of Limpopo Stadium and Seshego Stadium in Polokwane.

== Honours ==
- First Division promotion/Premier League relegation Play-offs: 1
  - 2007–08

== Club records ==
- Premier Soccer League:

2008–09 – 16th

- National First Division:

2006–07 – 13th
2007–08 – 2nd (Coastal Stream) (promoted through play-offs)
2009–10 – 3rd (Coastal Stream)
2010–11 – 1st (Coastal Stream)
2011–12 – 10th (Polokwane City playing under the Bay United name)

- Nedbank Cup:

2007 – Round of 32
2008 – NFD Qualification Round
2009 – Round of 16
2010 – NFD Qualification Round
2011 – NFD Qualification Round
2012 – Round of 32 (Polokwane City playing under the Bay United name)

- Telkom Knockout:

2008 – Quarter-Finals

- Baymed Cup:

2006 – Round of 16

== Sponsorship ==
The team's main sponsor was Volkswagen South Africa, who had previously owned the club. The team was also sponsored by Aberdare Cables. Puma was the team's technical sponsor.

== Former coaches ==
- (Serbia) Vladislav Heric: 2006 – 2008
- (Zimbabwe) Pernell McKop^{1}: 2008
- (South Africa) Khabo Zondo: 2008 – 2009
- (South Africa) Eddie Dyaloyi^{1}: 2009
- (Botswana) David Bright: 2009 – 2012
- ^1Caretaker coach
