= Clement Bissong =

Nigerian footballer (born 1983)

Clement Bissing
Personal information
- Date of birth: 29 September 1983 (age 43)
- Place of birth: Calabar, Nigeria
- Position: Forward

Senior career*
Years	Team	Apps	(Gls)
2002–2004	Calabar Rovers	41	(14)
2004–2008	Orlando Pirates	1	(0)
2008–?	Dynamos	19	(1)
- * Club domestic league appearances and goals as of 19 August 2008

Clement Bissong (born 29 September 1983) is a Nigerian former professional footballer who played as a striker.

== Career ==
Bissong moved to Dynamos from Orlando Pirates in August 2008. He had only made one appearance for Pirates despite signing a three-year contract in August 2004.
