= Tony de Nobrega =

South African football coach

Antonio "Tony" de Nobrega (born 2 February 1969 in Cape Town) is a retired South African association football coach.

He managed South African Premiership club Bloemfontein Celtic from February 2006 until April 2007, as well as Vasco da Gama.
