= Keenin Lesch =

South African soccer player

Personal information
- Full name: Keenin Carlo Lesch
- Date of birth: 13 March 1981 (age 45)
- Place of birth: Cape Town, South Africa
- Height: 1.80 m (5 ft 11 in)
- Position: Central midfielder

Youth career
- Manchester United (Cape Town)
- Cape Town Spurs
- Ajax Cape Town

Senior career*
| Years | Team | Apps | (Gls) |
- Santos Cape Town
- Saxon Rovers
- Avendale Athletico
| 2003–2012 | Vasco da Gama | | |
| 2012–2013 | Milano United | 19 | (1) |

Managerial career
- 2013–2016: Vasco da Gama
- * Club domestic league appearances and goals as of 18 June 2013 ‡ National team caps and goals as of 18 June 2013

Keenin Lesch (born 13 March 1981) is a South African formersoccer player who played as a midfielder. He has coached National First Division club Vasco da Gama.
