= Motherwell NU2 Stadium =

Multi-use stadium in Motherwell, South Africa

Motherwell NU 2 community Stadium
- NU Stadium
- Interactive map of Motherwell NU 2 community Stadium
- Location: Motherwell, Eastern Cape
- Coordinates: 33.802663°S 25.611029°E
- Owner: Nelson Mandela Metropolitan Municipality

NU 2 Stadium is a multi-use stadium in Motherwell, Eastern Cape, South Africa. It is currently used mostly for football matches and is the home ground of Bay Academy.

Between January and February, schools of Motherwell they go there to race. The school that has won the prizes it has to go with it."Riboh".
