= Ernst Middendorp =

German soccer coach (born 1958)

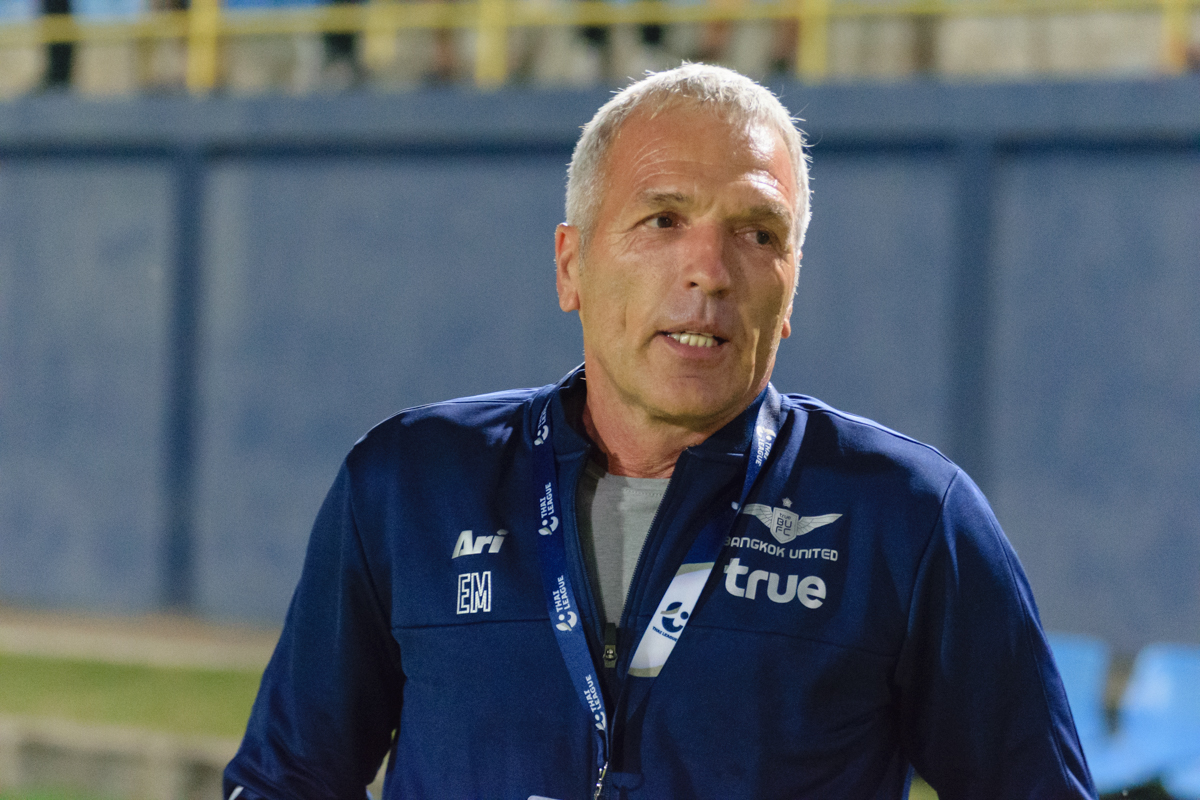
- Middendorp as Bangkok United technical director in 2018

Personal information
- Full name: Ernst Johannes Middendorp
- Date of birth: 28 October 1958 (age 68)
- Place of birth: Freren, West Germany

Senior career*
Years	Team	Apps	(Gls)
1977–1981	SG Freren	85	(72)
1981–1982	TuS Lingen	17	(9)
1982–1985	VfB Rheine	91	(83)
1985–1987	VfB Alstätte	42	(37)
Total		235	(198)

Managerial career
- 1987–1988: Eintracht Nordhorn
- 1988–1990: Arminia Bielefeld
- 1990–1992: VfB Rheine
- 1992–1994: FC Gütersloh
- 1994–1998: Arminia Bielefeld
- 1999: KFC Uerdingen
- 1999: VfL Bochum
- 1999–2002: Asante Kotoko
- 2002–2003: FC Augsburg
- 2004: Hearts of Oak SC
- 2004–2005: Tractor Sazi
- 2005–2007: Kaizer Chiefs
- 2007: Arminia Bielefeld
- 2008–2009: Changchun Yatai
- 2009: Rot-Weiss Essen
- 2009: Anorthosis Famagusta
- 2009–2011: Maritzburg United
- 2011: Golden Arrows
- 2012–2013: Maritzburg United
- 2013–2014: Bloemfontein Celtic
- 2015–2016: Chippa United
- 2017–2018: Bangkok United (technical director)
- 2018–2020: Kaizer Chiefs
- 2020: Saint George
- 2020–2022: Maritzburg United
- 2023: Swallows FC
- 2023: SV Meppen
- 2023: Singida Fountain Gate
- 2023–: Cape Town Spurs
- * Club domestic league appearances and goals

Ernst Middendorp (born 28 October 1958) is a German football coach who coaches Cape Town Spurs. Apart from coaching in Germany, Middendorp has coached football clubs in Ghana, South Africa, Ethiopia, Tanzania, China, Iran and Cyprus. He has also become the technical director for Thailand club Bangkok United in 2017.

== Education ==
Middendorp was born in Freren. Prior to coaching he was a lecturer of economics, political science and informatics at vocational colleges . In 1996, he attained his UEFA Pro License (Fußball-Lehrer) from the Deutsche Sporthochschule in Köln, Germany. In 2000, he began studying communication and management at PR Kolleg Berlin, Germany, where he studied through 2002.

== Managerial career ==
Middendorp has coached professional football on the highest level for nearly 20 years in Europe, Asia and Africa, having a UEFA Pro License (Fussball-Lehrer) from the German Football Association. In addition, Middendorp has experience analyzing FIFA World Cup tournaments (2006 and 2010), as well as the UEFA Euro 2012 tournament.

Middendorp started his coaching career with VfB Alstätte where he coached from July 1985 to June 1987. He then moved on to Eintracht Nordhorn where he was head coach from 1 July 1987 to 18 April 1988.

=== Arminia Bielefeld ===
Middendorp's first stint as Arminia Bielefeld head coach was from 18 April 1988 to 8 October 1990. His first match was a 2–1 loss to SG Wattenscheid 09. He finished the 1987–88 2. Bundesliga season with two wins, one draw, and seven losses. Arminia Bielefeld finished in last place and were relegated.

=== VfB Rheine ===
Middendorp went on to become head coach of VfB Rheine from November 1990 to June 1992. After VfB Rheine, Middendorp was head coach of FC Gütersloh between 1 July 1992 and 30 June 1994. He finished 13th in the 1992–93 season and ninth in the 1993–94 season.

=== second stint at Arminia Bielefeld ===
Middendorp took over as head coach of Arminia Bielefeld for a second time on 25 August 1994. He finished with a record of 40 wins, 26 draws, and 47 losses in his second stint. During his tenure, the club was promoted to the Bundesliga in 1996. In 2005, when Arminia Bielefeld was celebrating its 100th anniversary, Middendorp was elected their "Coach of the Century".

=== KFC Uerdingen ===
Middendorp was head coach of KFC Uerdingen from 25 March 1999 to 30 June 1999. He had five, two draws, and two losses in nine matches during his time at Uerdingen.

=== VfL Bochum ===
Middendorp was head coach of VfL Bochum between 1 July 1999 and 25 October 1999. During his time at Bochum, he had a record of three wins, three draws, and five losses.

=== Asante Kotoko ===
Middendorp then went to Ghana to become the head coach of Asante Kotoko between January 2000 and June 2002.

=== FC Augsburg ===
Middendorp returned to Germany to become head coach of FC Augsburg on 1 July 2002. He was at Augsburg until 28 September 2003. He had a record of 21 wins, eight draws, and 16 losses.

=== Hearts of Oak ===
Middendorp then returned to Ghana to become head coach of Hearts of Oak between March 2004 and June 2004.

=== Tractor Sazi ===
Middendorp then went to Iran to become head coach of Tractor Sazi between July 2004 and June 2005.

=== Kaizer Chiefs ===
Middendorp returned to Africa to become head coach the South African Castle Premiership team Kaizer Chiefs from the beginning of the 2005–06 season up to 4 March 2007. His first match was a 1–0 win against Bush Bucks F.C. At the start of the 2006–07 season, Middendorp guided his team to the SAA Supa 8 trophy. The Kaizer Chiefs defeated Supersport United in the final. Middendorp's departure happened on 4 March 2007. His final match was a 2–1 loss to AmaZulu.

=== Third stint at Arminia Bielefeld ===
On 14 March 2007, Middendorp started his third stint as a coach at Arminia Bielefeld, but was fired by club management on 10 December 2007.

=== Changchun Yatai ===
From there Middendorp went to coach the Chinese club, Changchun Yatai, but left the club in December 2008

=== Rot Weiss Essen ===
Middendorp returned to Germany, where he signed a contract with Rot Weiss Essen On 6 April 2009, he left the team after just 29 days. He had won only one match during his 29 days.

=== Anorthosis Famagusta ===
On 7 May 2009, Middendorp joined Cypriot club, Anorthosis Famagusta, but was fired on 24 July 2009 following their elimination in the second round of the 2009–10 UEFA Europa League.

=== Maritzburg United ===
On 16 November 2009, Middendorp replaced Gordon Igesund as head coach of South African club Maritzburg United, and coach them until 12 March 2011. He won five out of the final 15 league matches. His final match was a 2–2 draw against Vasco da Gama on 5 March 2011.

=== Golden Arrows ===
Middendorp was head coach of Golden Arrows between 21 March 2011 and 30 September 2011. Golden Arrows won two out of five matches to finish the 2010–11 season. His final match was a 2–1 win against Kaizer Chiefs.

On 18 January 2012, Middendorp returned to Maritzburg United. He resigned as head coach of Maritzburg United on 10 October 2013 before joining Bloemfontein Celtic as head coach on 11 October 2013. Celtic finished off the 2013–14 season with nine wins in 24 league matches. He left the club on 14 December 2014. His final match was a 0–0 draw against Moroka Swallows on the same day. He coached the Eastern Province SA Premier League team Chippa United from 5 January to 30 March 2015. Middendorp didn't win any matches at Chippa United.

In the 2015–16 season Ernst led not one but two South African Premier League teams from the relegation position to safety. He took Free State Stars from position 16 at the bottom of the league on matchday three to position six within four months, averaging two points a game. On 28 December 2015, Ernst returned to Maritzburg United (a club he coached twice before) who were then in position 16 and facing the stark danger of relegating. Ernst and his team narrowed the gap until the final nail-biting game of the season when Maritzburg United moved to the safety of position 14.

Middendorp returned to Kaizer Chiefs on 7 December 2018. His first match was a 1–0 win against SuperSport United on 12 December 2018. Kaizer Chiefs finished the 2018–19 season in ninth place. Kaizer Chiefs finished the following season in 2nd place and qualified for the 2020–21 CAF Champions League. Then he coached Saint George between 23 October 2020 and 24 November 2020.

Middendorp returned to Maritzburg United on 26 November 2020. his first match was a 2–1 loss to SuperSport United on 27 November 2020.

He has been the mentor of Fadlu Davids, who spent much of his time learning the coaching trade as assistant coach to Middendorp: at Maritzburg, Bloemfontein Celtic and Chippa United.

In March 2023, Middendorp returned to Germany to manage SV Meppen. On 16 August 2023, he resigned from this position after being relegated to the Regionalliga Nord and suffering two defeats in the first three games of the 2023–24 season.

In September 2023, Middendorp was appointed as the head coach of Tanzanian Singida Fountain Gate replacing Hans van der Pluijm. He resigned after just two weeks and one game, a 1–0 win over Future in the 2023–24 CAF Confederation Cup qualifying rounds, due to disputes with the club management.

He was appointed manager of South African premiership club Cape Town Spurs in November 2023.

== Coaching record ==
As of 2 June 2024

Team	From	To	Record					Ref.
Team	From	To	G	W	D	L	Win %	Ref.
VfB Alstätte	1 July 1985	30 June 1987	—					
Eintracht Nordhorn	1 July 1987	18 April 1988	—					
Arminia Bielefeld	18 April 1988	8 October 1990	102	57	24	21	55.88	
VfB Rheine	1 November 1990	30 June 1992	48	15	20	13	31.25	
FC Gütersloh	1 July 1992	30 June 1994	64	20	17	27	31.25	
Arminia Bielefeld	25 August 1994	16 August 1998	143	59	33	51	41.26	
KFC Uerdingen 05	25 March 1999	30 June 1999	11	3	3	5	27.27	
VfL Bochum	1 July 1999	25 October 1999	11	3	3	5	27.27	
Asante Kotoko	1 January 2000	30 June 2002	—					
FC Augsburg	1 July 2002	28 September 2003	45	21	8	16	46.67	
Hearts of Oak	10 March 2004	30 June 2004	—					
Tractor Sazi	12 July 2004	30 June 2005	—					
Kaizer Chiefs	1 July 2005	4 March 2007	53	21	21	11	39.62	
Arminia Bielefeld	14 March 2007	10 December 2007	27	11	4	12	40.74	
Changchun Yatai	27 July 2008	31 December 2008	18	7	6	5	38.89	
Rot-Weiss Essen	6 April 2009	6 May 2009	6	2	0	4	33.33	
Anorthosis Famagusta	7 May 2009	24 July 2009	4	3	0	1	75.00	
Maritzburg United	16 November 2009	12 March 2011	40	12	11	17	30.00	
Golden Arrows	21 March 2011	30 September 2011	12	5	4	3	41.67	
Maritzburg United	18 January 2012	10 October 2013	54	15	20	19	27.78	
Bloemfontein Celtic	11 October 2013	14 December 2014	41	13	15	13	31.71	
Chippa United	5 January 2015	30 March 2015	7	0	3	4	0.00	
Free State Stars	29 August 2015	21 December 2015	10	5	3	2	50.00	
Maritzburg United	28 December 2015	24 November 2016	31	8	10	13	25.81	
Kaizer Chiefs	7 December 2018	9 September 2020	60	31	12	17	51.67	
Saint George	23 October 2020	24 November 2020	—					
Maritzburg United	26 November 2020	30 June 2022	59	15	19	25	25.42	
Swallows FC	15 December 2022	6 March 2023	11	3	2	6	27.27	
SV Meppen	7 March 2023	16 August 2023	16	6	2	8	37.50	
Singida Fountain Gate	4 September 2023	19 September 2023	1	1	0	0	100.00	
Cape Town Spurs	17 November 2023	present	20	5	5	10	25.00	
