= Carlos das Neves =

South African soccer player

Personal information
- Full name: Joao Carlos das Neves
- Date of birth: 21 August 1968 (age 58)
- Place of birth: Cape Town, South Africa
- Position: Midfielder

Youth career
- Vasco da Gama

Senior career*
Years	Team	Apps	(Gls)
- Hellenic

Managerial career
- 2008–2011: Vasco da Gama
- * Club domestic league appearances and goals

Carlos das Neves (born 21 August 1968 in Cape Town, Western Cape) is a South African former football player and coach who last managed Vasco da Gama.He has a daughter Alyssandra and a son Mateo
