= Khoza =

Khoza is a surname. Notable people with the surname include:

- Buti Khoza (born 1988), South African footballer
- Irvin Khoza (born 1948), South African football administrator and businessman
- Makhosi Khoza (born?), South African politician and writing system creator
- Malibongwe Khoza (born 2004), South African soccer player
- Muzi Khoza, South African politician
- Nonhlanhla Khoza (born?), South African politician
- Ntshingwayo Khoza (c.1809–1883), Zulu general
- Snowy Khoza (born?), South African business executive
