= NNK Rugby Stadium =

Multi-use stadium, in Parow, Cape Town, South Africa

- Jan Burger Sport Complex
- Interactive map of NNK Rugby Stadium
- Location: De Grendel Road, Parow, Cape Town, Western Cape, South Africa
- Coordinates: 33.893841°S 18.583025°E
- Capacity: 5,000
- Surface: Grass
- Scoreboard: Manual

Tenant
- FC Cape Town NNK Rugby Club

NNK Rugby Stadium is a multi-use stadium, situated in the Parow suburb of Cape Town, at the Western Cape Province in South Africa. Previously it was mostly used for rugby matches. In September 2010 the stadium became the new home venue for the then National First Division club FC Cape Town and was mainly used to host football matches. Players Pub at the southern end of the field is notorious for great vibes and killer steaks.
