= 2014–15 National First Division =

National First Division
- Season: 2014–15
- Champions: Golden Arrows
- Promoted: Golden Arrows, Jomo Cosmos
- Matches: 240
- Goals: 603 (2.51 per match)
- Average goals/game: 2.51 per match

The 2014–15 National First Division was the 2014–15 season of the National First Division, the second tier of South Africa's professional football. It was played from September 2014 until May 2015 and was won by Golden Arrows.

== League table ==
Pos	Team	Pld	W	D	L	GF	GA	GD	Pts	Promotion or relegation
1	Golden Arrows (C, P)	30	16	12	2	46	25	+21	60	Promotion to 2015–16 South African Premier Division
2	Jomo Cosmos	30	15	8	7	52	28	+24	53	Qualification to 2014–15 PSL Playoff Tournament
3	Black Leopards	30	15	6	9	45	32	+13	51	Qualification to 2014–15 PSL Playoff Tournament
4	Thanda Royal Zulu	30	14	8	8	48	33	+15	50	
5	Cape Town All Stars	30	12	11	7	42	36	+6	47	
6	Milano United	30	9	15	6	36	31	+5	42	
7	Vasco da Gama	30	10	12	8	29	25	+4	42	
8	FC Cape Town	30	10	12	8	35	33	+2	42	
9	Baroka	30	10	10	10	37	31	+6	40	
10	Royal Eagles	30	11	7	12	36	47	−11	40	
11	Highlands Park	30	10	6	14	38	39	−1	36	
12	African Warriors	30	9	9	12	30	41	−11	36	
13	Santos	30	10	6	14	34	46	−12	36	
14	Witbank Spurs	30	7	10	13	26	37	−11	31	
15	Garankuwa United	30	5	7	18	32	51	−19	22	Relegation to SAFA Second Division
16	Maluti FET College	30	5	5	20	37	68	−31	20	Relegation to SAFA Second Division

(C) Champions; (P) Promoted

== Play-offs ==
Pos	Lge	Team	Pld	W	D	L	GF	GA	GD	Pts	Promotion
1	NFD	Jomo Cosmos (P)	4	2	1	1	5	3	+2	7	Promotion to 2015–16 South African Premier Division
2	NFD	Black Leopards	4	2	1	1	3	2	+1	7	
3	PRE	Moroka Swallows	4	1	0	3	3	6	−3	3	

Source: rssf
(P) Promoted
