= Nkosinathi Mthiyane =

South African soccer player

Personal information
- Date of birth: 25 June 1988 (age 38)
- Place of birth: Ngwelezane, South Africa
- Height: 1.62 m (5 ft 4 in)
- Position: Left-back

Senior career*
Years	Team	Apps	(Gls)
2012–2013	Thanda Royal Zulu	26	(14)
2013–2015	AmaZulu	36	(2)
2015–2016	Chippa United	26	(4)
2016–2017	Orlando Pirates	1	(0)
2017	→ Golden Arrows (loan)	13	(0)
2018–2019	Chippa United	0	(0)
2019	Steenberg United	1	(0)
- * Club domestic league appearances and goals

Nkosinathi Mthiyane (born 25 June 1988) is a South African former professional soccer player who played as a left-back for several teams in the Premier Soccer League.
