= Mzimela =

Mzimela is a surname. Notable people with the surname include:

- Mbongeni Mzimela (born 1985), South African footballer
- Siza Mzimela, South African business executive
