= 2006 Baymed Cup =

The Baymed Cup was a knockout cup competition for South Africa's 2nd-level football (soccer) clubs sponsored by Baymed Medical Scheme. The competition was to be played from August to October of each year and to include the 16 teams that made up the Mvela Golden League. The prize money for the winner was R1-million.

It was only ever played once.

== First round ==
19 August

Witbank Spurs	2 - 3	Ga-Rankuwa United

19 August

Free State Stars	4 - 0	Nathi Lions

19 August

FC AK	1 - 0	OR Tambo Cosmos

19 August

Vasco Da Gama	w/o	Bush Bucks

20 August

Fidentia Rangers	3 - 1	University of Pretoria

20 August

City Pillars	2 - 0	Bay United

20 August

PJ Stars	1 - 1	Winners Park
Penalties
	3 - 4

20 August

Dynamos	3 - 0	Durban Stars

== Quarter finals ==
3 September

Ga-Rankuwa United	2 - 0	City Pillars

3 September

FC AK	4 - 3	Winners Park

3 September

Dynamos	2 - 1	Fidentia Rangers

3 September

Free State Stars	1 - 0	Vasco Da Gama

== Semi finals ==
16 September

Ga-Rankuwa United	0 - 3	Free State Stars

17 September

Dynamos	0 - 1	F.C.A.K

== Final ==
15 October 2006

Free State Stars	2 - 1	F.C.A.K
