= Charles Mopeli Stadium =

South African sports stadium

- Ka Skoting
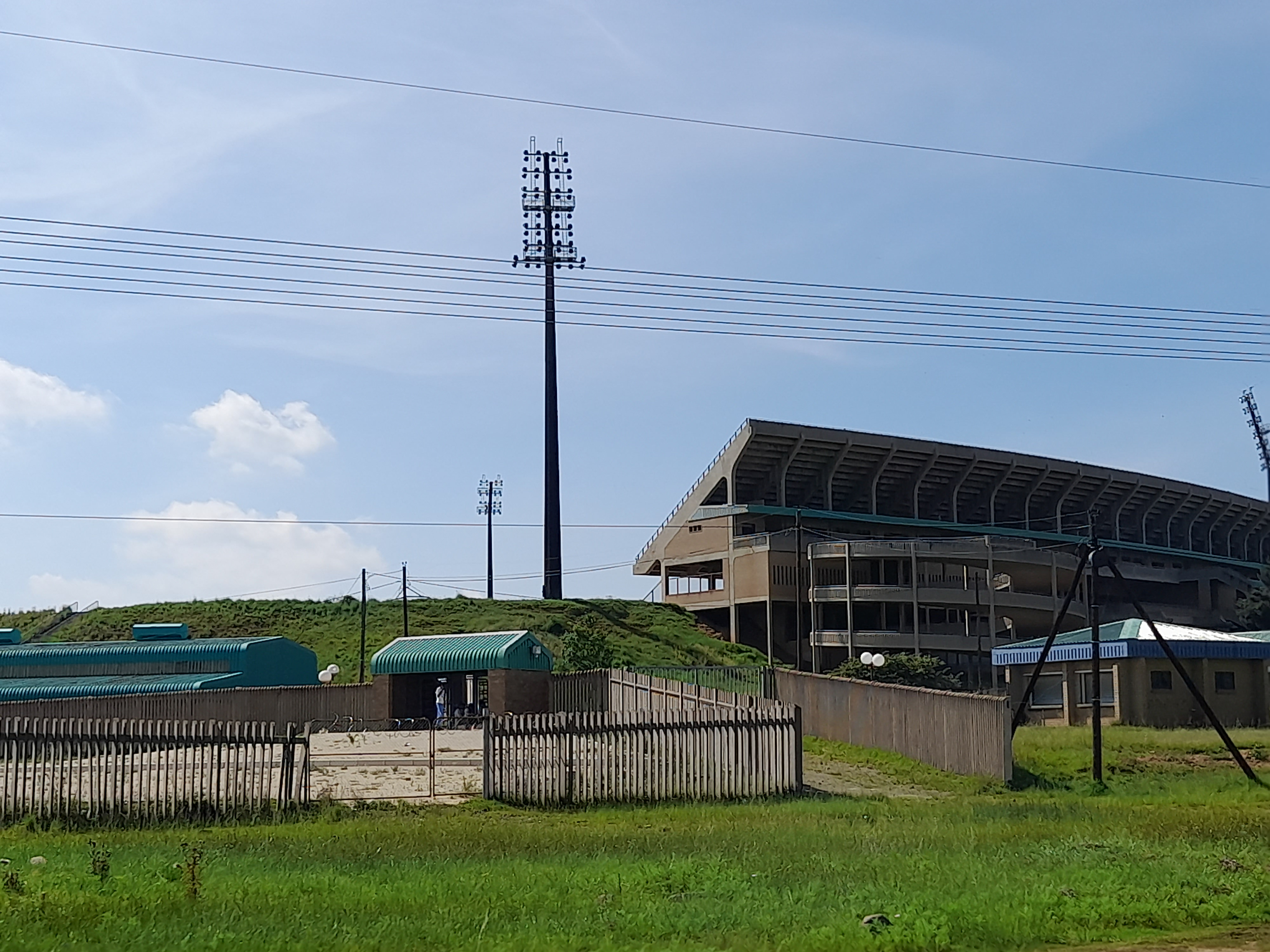
- Interactive map of Charles Mopeli Stadium
- Former names: QwaQwa Stadium
- Location: 2881 Motsi Street, Ha-Sethunya, Phuthaditjhaba, Free State, South Africa
- Coordinates: 28.580697°S 28.83203°E
- Owner: Maluti-a-Phofung Municipality
- Capacity: 35,000
- Surface: Grass

Charles Mopeli Stadium is located in Phuthaditjhaba, South Africa. It was mostly used by the now defunct Free State Stars, and African Warriors when they were in the National First Division before their relegation in 2015–16. The stadium has a capacity of 35,000.

The stadium also hosted the Nedbank Cup fixture between Soweto giants Orlando Pirates and Maluti FET College.

By 2021, the stadium was derelict, with the Maluti-a-Phofung Local Municipality stating that they intended to refurbish it.

As of 2023, R14 million had been spent on refurbishments, but the condition of the stadium was still described as "deplorable" and a "testament to corruption" by the Democratic Alliance.
