= F.C. Cape Town =

FC Cape Town
- Full name: Football Club Cape Town
- Nickname: African Beasts
- Founded: 2006
- Dissolved: 2017
- Ground: NNK Rugby Stadium, Parow, Cape Town
- Capacity: 5,000
- Owner: Errol Dicks
- Chairman: Errol Dicks
- Manager: Johnny Ferreira
- League: National First Division
- 2015–16: National First Division, 10th
Home colours	Away colours

FC Cape Town was a South African football club based in the Parow suburb of Cape Town.

The club was founded in 2006 when it was agreed to purchase the franchise license of Vasco da Gama. It was dissolved in 2017 when the franchise license was sold to Ubuntu Cape Town FC.

== History ==
Season	Division	Pos.	Pld	W	D	L	GF	GA	Pts
2007–08	National First Division (Coastal Stream)	4	21	6	8	7	24	24	26
2008–09	National First Division (Coastal Stream)	2	21	11	6	4	32	20	39
2009–10	National First Division (Coastal Stream)	6	21	6	7	8	21	26	25
2010–11	National First Division (Coastal Stream)	5	21	4	11	6	23	20	23
2011–12	National First Division	8	30	10	9	11	38	36	39
2012–13	National First Division	12	30	9	8	10	31	32	35
2013–14	National First Division	12	30	8	11	11	35	41	35
2014–15	National First Division	8	30	10	12	8	35	33	42
2015–16	National First Division	10	30	9	6	15	33	50	33
2016–17	National First Division	13	30	8	10	12	35	49	34

== Post-sale ==
Following the club's license sale to Ubuntu Cape Town, the club's management continued to operate a global advisory and legal services firm known as FC Cape Town Consulting.

FC Cape Town Consulting operates with football clients across the globe and is active in the following areas in terms of the FIFA Regulations: Umbro kit Supply (exclusivity in Africa), training and development compensation, solidarity payment mechanisms, legal services for overdue payables, legal services for contractual disputes, legal services for transfer disputes, legal services for club/coach/player disputes, player risk assessments, compliance services, intermediary services, regulations and Internal constitutions, sponsorship acquisition, sports marketing, representation before FIFA and CAS as well as anti doping.
