= Mbombela United F.C. =

Mbombela United
- Full name: Mbombela United Football Club
- Founded: 2010; 16 years ago
- Ground: KaNyamazane Stadium
- Capacity: 15,000

Mbombela United FC were a community soccer team based in the Mpumalanga provincial capital, Mbombela.

The team was established in 2010 and was wholly owned by the Matsebula brothers, Skhumbuzo and Oupa, prominent business people in the transport and property sector. It was popularly known as Tingwenyama, meaning pride of lions in the local SiSwati language. Mbombela United won the Mpumalanga stream of 2012–13 SAFA Second Division, then known as Vodacom league, under the guidance of caretaker coach, Lesego Matsomela, but failed to qualify for a National First Division (NFD) spot via the playoffs.

During the 2014–15 season, Mbombela United once again won the Mpumalanga Stream under the guidance of Mfanimphela "Mphela" Maseko after defeating Mthatha Bucks by 2 goals to 1 in the finals courtesy of goals by Isaac Nana and Inky Masuku, winning promotion to the National First Division.

In its first NFD campaign, under the mentorship of Vusi Phillip Mkatshwa, Mbombela United came close to automatic promotion, but managed to secure a spot in the playoffs. However, they failed to qualify for a spot in the Premier Soccer League.

They were relegated to the SAFA Second Division at the end of the 2019–20 National First Division. They initially finished on 32 points, avoiding relegation on goal difference, but were docked 23 points after fielding Sabelo Ndzinisa, who had initially signed for Sporting, in 23 games.

== Honours ==
- SAFA Second Division: 2014–15 (Note: The league was known as the ABC Motsepe League at the time for sponsorship reasons.)
