= Dynamos F.C. (South Africa) =

Dynamos
- Full name: Dynamos Football Club
- Nicknames: Ri Khomeni Ri Nga Peli (Never let it set), The Dynamites
- Founded: 1997
- Ground: Giyani Stadium, Giyani
- Capacity: 20,000
- Chairman: Pat Malabela
- Manager: (South Africa) Owen Da Gama
Home colours	Away colours

Dynamos F.C was a South African professional soccer club based in Giyani, Limpopo.

== League record ==
=== Premiership ===
- 1998/99 – 17th (relegated)

=== National First Division ===
- 1999–2000 – 2nd (Inland Stream)
- 2000–01 – 12th
- 2001–02 – 1st (Inland Stream, promoted)

=== Premiership ===
- 2002/03 – 7th
- 2003/04 – 14th
- 2004/05 – 10th
- 2005/06 – 13th (sold the status)

=== National First Division ===
- 2006–07 – 6th
- 2007–08 – 2nd (Inland Stream)
- 2008–09 – 5th (Inland Stream)
- 2009–10 – 5th (Inland Stream)
- 2010–11 – 6th (Inland Stream)
- 2011–12 – 14th
- 2012–13 – 16th (relegated)

== History ==
The club was bought by Pat Malabela in the early 2000s.

In 2006, the club sold its Premiership status to AmaZulu.

Later, after a dispute over ownership, they were relegated from the professional ranks, finishing bottom of the 2012–13 National First Division, after which they ceased to exist.

== Rivalry ==
They had a stern rivalry against Black Leopards, being the only two clubs in the province, and they contested what was known as Limpopo Derby, even though Bilika All stars and Giyani Hotspurs also may be considered for the Giyani derby .
