= Batau F.C. =

Batau FC
- Full name: Batau Football Club
- Founded: April 1, 2006
- Ground: Mpumalanga Stadium, Ermelo
- Capacity: 6,000

Batau FC was a South African football (soccer) club based in Ermelo, Mpumalanga.

They were relegated from the 2010–11 National First Division (NFD). In August 2011, they failed in an attempt to purchase the shares of NFD team United FC. Subsequently, they won the 2011–12 SAFA Second Division Mpumalanga, but failed to make it out of the playoffs.
