= Hanover Park F.C. =

Hanover Park
- Full name: Hanover Park Football Club
- Founded: 2005; 21 years ago (as bought Mother City Second Division status)
- Ground: Wynberg Military Base Stadium, Wynberg, Cape Town, Western Cape, South Africa
- Capacity: N/A
- Chairman: Rieduwaan Anthony
- Manager: Andrew Pequeno
- League: ABC Motsepe League
Home colours	Away colours

Hanover Park is a South African football (soccer) club based in the suburb Hanover Park of Cape Town. They currently play in the National First Division, Coastal Stream, with a home venue at the nearby Wynberg Military Base Stadium, situated in the suburb Wynberg.
