= Winners Park F.C. =

Winners Park
- Full name: Winners Park Football Club
- Nickname: Badumedi (The Believers)
- Founded: 1984
- Ground: Mookgopong Grounds, Mookgopong, Limpopo, South Africa
- Capacity: 5,000
- Chairman: Morris Chokoe
- Manager: Innocent Mayoyo
- League: Vodacom League, Limpopo Province
- 2010–11 season: 2
Home colours	Away colours

Winners Park is a football (soccer) club based in Mookgopong, which is a town roughly 100 km southwest of Polokwane on the N1 and R101 roads, situated inside the Limpopo province of South Africa. They were relegated from the National First Division to Vodacom League in May 2010. This imposed a set of changes for the club, including a move of their home venue from Seshego Stadium, to the less expensive Mookgopong Grounds.
