= African Warriors F.C. =

South African football club

African Warriors
- Full name: African Warriors Football Club
- Founded: 2006, renamed Happy Kings FC
- Ground: Charles Mopeli Stadium, Phuthaditjhaba
- Capacity: 50,000
- Manager: (Nigeria) Temiloluwa Lawson
- League: ABC Motsepe League (Free State Stream)
- 2025–26: 6th
Home colours	Away colours

African Warriors is a South African football club based in Phuthaditjhaba, Free State.

== Managers ==
- (Serbia) Vladislav Heric (Dec 7, 2010—25 Oct, 2011)
- (South Africa) David Vilakazi (March 2014— Dec 2014)
- (South Africa) Johnny Mafereka (Feb 2016–

== Honours ==
SAFA Second Division (Free State)

Champions - 2024–25

== League record ==
=== National First Division ===
- 2007–08 – 4th (Inland Stream)
- 2008–09 – 3rd (Coastal Stream)
- 2009–10 – 2nd (Inland Stream)
- 2010–11 – 4th (Coastal Stream)
- 2011–12 – 6th
- 2012–13 – 7th
- 2013–14 – 8th
- 2014–15 – 12th
- 2015–16 – 11th
- 2016–17 – 15th (relegated)

=== SAFA Second Division (Free State Stream) ===
- 2016–17 – 12th
- 2017–18 – 14th
- 2020–21 – 5th (Stream B)
- 2021–22 – 7th (Stream B)
- 2022–23 – 4th (Stream A)
- 2023–24 – 5th (Stream B)
- 2024–25 – 1st
- 2025–26 – 6th
