= Nathi Lions F.C. =

Nathi Lions
- Full name: Nathi Lions Football Club
- Nickname(s): Amabhubesi (The Lions)
- Founded: 1997
- Dissolved: 2011
- Ground: Princess Magogo Stadium, KwaMashu, Durban, KwaZulu-Natal, South Africa
- Capacity: 12,000
Home colours	Away colours

Nathi Lions was a South African football club based in KwaMashu, roughly 30 km north of Durban. The team franchise was renamed Atlie FC in 2011.

Their best result was making it to the quarterfinals of the 2008 Nedbank Cup.
