= United F.C. (South Africa) =

United FC
- Full name: United Football Club
- Nickname(s): The Vultures
- Founded: 1999
- Ground: Griqua Park, Kimberley
- Capacity: 18,000
- Chairman: Amos Mahlaba
- Manager: Leslie Notši
- League: National First Division
- 2012–13: National First Division, 8th
| Home colours | Away colours |

United FC was a South African soccer club based in Kimberley that played in the National First Division.

The club sold their franchise to Garankuwa United prior to the start of the 2014–15 National First Division.

== Honours ==
- 2008–09 Vodacom League champions
