= FC AK =

- Full name: Football Club Azziz Kara
- Nickname(s): Abafana Bemangaliso
- Founded: 2006; 19 years ago
- Ground: Bill Jardine Stadium, West Rand, Johannesburg
- Capacity: 5,000
- Chairman: Joseph Cotty
- Manager: Jerobeam Koert
- League: National First Division
- 2011–12: National First Division, 5th
Home colours	Away colours

FC AK is a South African football club from the West Rand, Johannesburg which was established in 2006. Although the club has been playing its home fixtures at the Eldorado Park Stadium, the club relocated to its place of origin in March 2013. Its motto is "Soli Deo Nissi", translated in English to "In God We Trust".

The club has established strategic partnerships with community based enterprises and professional agencies, and with community based football associations and youth development academies in the West Rand, such as Florida Albion Football Club who currently participate in the Castle League and Bosmont Local Football Association, who focus on youth development programmes for Under 9, 11, 15, 19, as part of their youth development skills transfer and skill development programme.

To further position the club within the West Rand community, from the 2013/2014 season, FC AK planned to occupy the Bill Jardine Stadium in the West Rand as its home ground, to host its home fixtures. The stadium is also home to the Raiders Rugby Club Franchise.

== History ==
Competing in the 2007–08 National First Division, the club won the Inland Stream but were initially found guilty of bribery and docked 15 points, and owner Azziz Kara fined R500 000 and banned from soccer for 30 years, but after a protracted appeals process, the sanction was reversed, and the club took their place in the championship final.

== Honours ==
- 2009—10 Vodacom League Gauteng Stream champions
- 2009—10 Vodacom League National Play-offs winners
- 2007—08 Winners of the National First Division Inland Stream
- 2006—07 Participated in the Baymed Cup Finals
