= Carara Kicks F.C. =

Carara Kicks
- Full name: Carara Kicks Football Club
- Founded: 2000
- Ground: Goble Park, Bethlehem
- Capacity: 20,000
- Chairman: Motebang Mokoena
- Manager: (Zimbabwe) William Mugeyi
- League: National First Division
Home colours	Away colours

Carara Kicks was a South African football (soccer) club based in Welkom, Free State that played in the National First Division.

The club was owned by Motebang Mokoena, the son of Free State Stars owner Mike Mokoena and served as a feeder team to Free State Stars, who at the time played in the Premiership.

They were relegated from the 2011–12 National First Division after being deducted points for fielding an improperly registered player.
