= Royal Eagles F.C. =

- Full name: Royal Eagles Football Club
- Founded: 2014
- Ground: King Goodwill Zwelithini Stadium, KwaZulu Natal
- Capacity: 10,000
- Coach: Morena Ramorebodi
- League: SAFA Second Division (KZN Stream)
- 2020–21: 10th (relegated)
Home colours

Royal Eagles were a South African football club based in Maritzburg, KwaZulu Natal that played in the National First Division.

== History ==
They were formed after Shauwn and Sbu Mpisane bought Sivutsa Stars and relocated the club to Durban.
