= Vasco da Gama F.C. =

Vasco da Gama Cape Town
- Full name: Club de Regatas Vasco da Gama
- Founded: 1980
- Ground: Parow Park, Parow, Cape Town
- Capacity: 3,000
Home colours	Away colours

Vasco da Gama is a South African football club based in the Parow suburb of the city of Cape Town. Coming from the lower ranks, the club had its roots entrenched in the local Portuguese South African community, and adopted its name, crest and team colours from the Brazilian club Club de Regatas Vasco da Gama.

In 2016, the club sold its National First Division (NFD) franchise to Stellenbosch.

== History ==
Vasco da Gama was established in 1980, carrying the name of famed Portuguese explorer Vasco da Gama. Being mainly a lower league club, Vasco won promotion to the National First Division in 2003, after being crowned champions of the Vodacom Second Division. In their first season of first division football they finished 5th, giving themselves the opportunity to build on their previous league performances.

After a successful 2005/2006 season, Vasco featured in the promotion playoffs, beating Bush Bucks in the semi-final. They lost 1–0 in the playoff finals to a Benoni Premier United team, which included Bafana Bafana players Bernard Parker and Tsepo Masilela. In 2008 they won the Vodacom League and regained promotion into the National First Division once again.

Vasco secured promotion to the Premiership when they beat Black Leopards 2–1 (aggregate score 3–2) in a promotional play-off at Parow Park on 7 March 2010.

After only one season in the Premiership Vasco was relegated finishing 15th on the log and losing the promotion/relegation playoffs.

On 9 January 2014, Vasco da Gama played a friendly match against German Bundesliga VfB Stuttgart at Coetzenberg Stadium in Stellenbosch and lost 5–0 after a brace from Mohammed Abdellaoue, plus goals from Cacau, Martin Harnik and Vedad Ibišević.

In August 2016, owner Mario Ferreira used the license of Vasco da Gama to create a new club in Stellenbosch, known as Stellenbosch F.C.

In June 2024, Vasco da Gama earned promotion from the SAFA Regional Leagues to the Western Cape Stream of the 2024–25 SAFA Second Division.

After two solid campaigns in the SAFA Second Division, Vasco da Gama sold their third tier status to Saxon Rovers FC for the 2026-27 season.

== Honours ==
National First Division

- First Division Coastal Stream champions: 2009–10

SAFA Second Division

- National Play-off winners: 2002–03, 2007–08
- Western Cape Stream champions: 2000–01, 2002–03, 2007–08

Amateur Club Championship

- SA Amateur Club Championship winners: 1988, 1990

Coke Cup

- 2024

== Managers ==
- (South Africa) Carlos das Neves (2008–2011)
- (Portugal) (South Africa) Tony de Nobrega (14 June 2011 – 5 June 2013)
- (South Africa) Keenin Lesch (1 Jul 2013–2016)
- (Northern Ireland) Sammy Troughton (2016)

== League record ==
=== National First Division ===
- 2008–09 – 6th Coastal Stream
- 2009–10 – 1st Coastal Stream (promoted)

=== Premiership ===
- 2010–11 – 15th (relegated)

=== National First Division ===
- 2011–12 – 7th
- 2012–13 – 9th
- 2013–14 – 9th
- 2014–15 – 7th
- 2015–16 – 13th

=== SAFA Second Division ===
- 2024–25 – 2nd (Stream A)
- 2025–26 – 7th (Stream A)
