= University of Pretoria F.C. =

University of Pretoria FC
- Full name: University of Pretoria Football Club
- Nicknames: AmaTuks, Tuks, Tukkies
- Founded: 2003, bought Pretoria City franchise
- Ground: Tuks Stadium, Hatfield, Pretoria
- Capacity: 12,000
- League: National First Division
- 2025–26: 11th
Home colours	Away colours

University of Pretoria Football Club, also known as Tuks or AmaTuks, is a South African association football club based in the Hatfield suburb of Pretoria that represents the University of Pretoria. They currently play in the National First Division (NFD).

== History ==
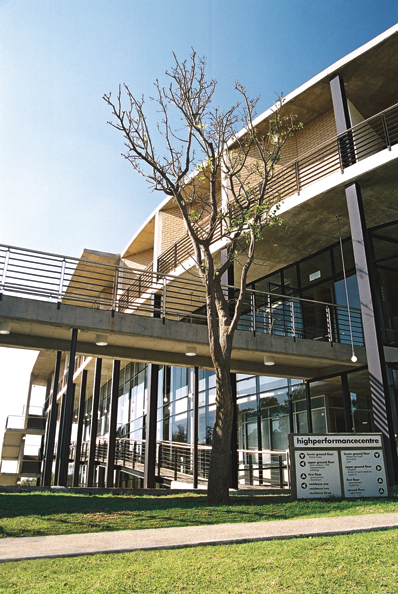
The university's High Performance Centre on the LC de Villiers Sport Grounds

The University established the Tuks Football Academy in 2002, originally playing in the SAFA Gauteng South Division. In the 2003–04 season the University acquired Pretoria City FC's second division status, subsequently winning the Vodacom League play-offs and being promoted to the NFD in 2004–05. In the 2006–07 season the club qualified for the Mvela Golden League play-offs. In the 2008–09 season the club was a Nedbank Cup finalist losing to Premiership team Moroka Swallows 0–1.

Following the 2011–12 season University of Pretoria gained promotion to the Premiership with Stephen Haupt as the head coach.

In the 2014–15 season they finished 13th in the Premiership, and the following 2015–16 season they finished 15th. They finished at the bottom of the Promotional Playoff log without a win and were relegated to the NFD. In the 2016–17 season they finished 12th in the NFD. The following 2017–18 season saw a slight improvement, finishing 10th, and the 2018–19 season saw the club finish 14th in the NFD.

== Honours ==
- Second Division Gauteng Stream: 2003–04
- Second Division National Play-offs: 2004
- National First Division: 2011–12

== Club records ==
- Most starts: (Zimbabwe) Washington Arubi 31
- Most goals: (Senegal) Mame Niang 10
- Most starts in a season: (Zimbabwe) Washington Arubi 31 (2012–13)
- Most goals in a season: (Senegal) Mame Niang 10 (2012–13)
- Record victory: 5–1 vs Ajax Cape Town (29/9/12, Premiership)
- Record defeat: 0–5 vs Stellenbosch (31/03/2019, NFD)

=== League record ===
==== National First Division ====
- 2010–11 – 3rd (Inland Stream)
- 2011–12 – 1st (promoted)

==== Premiership ====
- 2012–13 – 8th
- 2013–14 – 11th
- 2014–15 – 13th
- 2015–16 – 15th (relegated)

==== National First Division ====
- 2016–17 – 12th
- 2017–18 – 10th
- 2018–19 – 14th
- 2019–20 – 9th
- 2020–21 – 12th
- 2021–22 – 2nd
- 2022–23 – 8th
- 2023–24 – 2nd
- 2024–25 – 10th
- 2025–26 – 11th
