= Thanda Royal Zulu F.C. =

Thanda Royal Zulu
- Full name: Thanda Royal Zulu Football Club
- Nickname(s): Amabhubesi (The Lions)
- Short name: TRZ
- Founded: 2007, renamed Benoni Premier United
- Dissolved: 2017
- Ground: Richards Bay Stadium, Richards Bay
- Capacity: 8,000
- 2016–17: National First Division, 1st
Home colours	Away colours

Thanda Royal Zulu was a South African football club based in Richards Bay, KwaZulu-Natal.

== History ==
The club started after a Swedish consortium that included Sven-Goran Eriksson bought the franchise from Benoni Premier United at the end of the 2006–07 season. The new owners moved the franchise from Benoni to KwaZulu-Natal.

They played their home games at Richards Bay Stadium in Richards Bay having previously played their home games at the Hammarsdale Stadium in Hammarsdale.

In 2010 the club moved its headquarters from Durban to Richards Bay.

The club's nickname Amabhubesi was Zulu for Lions while Thanda means love.

The club won the 2016–17 National First Division. However, their franchise, and promotion to the 2017–18 Premiership was sold to fifth-placed Amazulu.

== League record ==
=== Premiership ===
- 2007–08 – 14th
- 2008–09 – 15th (relegated)

=== National First Division ===
- 2009–10 – 5th (Coastal Stream)
- 2010–11 – 2nd (Coastal Stream)
- 2011–12 – 3rd
- 2012–13 – 4th
- 2013–14 – 11th
- 2014–15 – 4th
- 2015–16 – 14th
- 2016–17 – 1st

== Shirt sponsor & kit manufacturer ==
- Shirt sponsor: Bell Equipment
- Kit manufacturer: Joma

== Franchise history ==
Period	Name	Location
1958–2004	Hellenic FC	Cape Town
2004–2007	Premier United Football Club	Benoni
2007–2017	Thanda Royal Zulu FC	Durban / Mpumalanga / Richards Bay
