= Witbank Spurs F.C. =

Witbank Spurs
- Full name: Witbank Spurs Football Club
- Nickname: Siyavutha
- Founded: 2000
- Ground: Puma Stadium, Witbank
- Capacity: 20,000
- Chairman: Thapelo Mafu
- Manager: Kagisho Dikgacoi
- League: National First Division
- 2017–18: National First Division, 5th
Home colours	Away colours

Witbank Spurs are a South African football (soccer) club based in Witbank, Mpumalanga that competes in the Premier Soccer League's National First Division.

== History ==
The club was formed in 1962 as Eastern Rangers Football Club. In 1975, the club was renamed Ferrometals United F.C. This was due to a sponsorship deal from Ferrometals. The club continued under the name until 2000, when Ferrometals stopped its sponsorship of the club. The club then took the name Witbank Spurs F.C. The club was again renamed in 2001, to Peoples Bank Spurs, due to a sponsorship agreement with People Bank. In 2019 the club was renamed the Anu Spurs.

Witbank Spurs spent most of its life in the Mpumalanga provincial league Following the 2004–05 season, the club was promoted to the National First Division.
