= 2009 MTN 8 =

Tournament details
- Country: South Africa
- Teams: 8

Final positions
- Champions: Golden Arrows (1st title)
- Runners-up: Ajax Cape Town

Tournament statistics
- Matches played: 9
- Goals scored: 30 (3.33 per match)
- Top goal scorer(s): 3 Njabulo Manqana (AmaZulu F.C.); Richard Henyekane

The 2009 MTN 8 was the 35th time that this annual tournament took place. It was contested by the eight top teams of the Premier Soccer League table at the end of the 2008-09 season. The tournament began on 4 August 2009, and ended on 24 October 2009. Golden Arrows beat Ajax Cape Town 6–0, in the final at Orlando Stadium.

== Teams ==
The eight teams that competed in the MTN 8 Wafa Wafa knockout competition are: (listed according to their finishing position in the 2008–09 Premier Soccer League.

1. Supersport United
2. Orlando Pirates
3. Kaizer Chiefs
4. Free State Stars
5. Golden Arrows
6. Bidvest Wits
7. Ajax Cape Town
8. Amazulu

The draw for the first round took place of 13 July 2009. Games will be played over 4 and 5 August 2009.

== Quarter-finals ==
4 August 2009
19:30

| Kaizer Chiefs | 3–1 | Bidvest Wits |
|---|---|---|
| N. Nhleko 3'; D. Mathebula 71'; K. Musona 90' | Report | 42' M. Haskins |

Rand Stadium, Johannesburg
4 August 2009
19:30

| AmaZulu | 2–2 (a.e.t.) | Supersport United |
|---|---|---|
| L. Nqxabi 52'; A. Dlamini 115' | Report | 26' A. Laffor; 118' T. Mongalo |
Penalties
| Biyela (penalty scored); Ritson (penalty scored); Sillo (penalty scored); Bishop (penalty missed); Ariweriyai (penalty scored) | 4–3 | (penalty missed) Kenkana; (penalty scored) Isaacs; (penalty scored) Laffor; (penalty scored) Maluleke; (penalty missed) Mongalo |

Chatsworth Stadium, Durban

5 August 2009
19:30

| Orlando Pirates | 1–2 | Ajax Cape Town |
|---|---|---|
| K. Mashego 53' | Report | 17' T. Serero; 76' D. Selolwane |

Coca Cola Park, Johannesburg
5 August 2009
20:15

| Free State Stars | 0–1 | Golden Arrows |
|---|---|---|
| | Report | 43' M. Bilankulu |

Charles Mopeli Stadium, Phuthaditjhaba

=== Teams through to the Semi-finals ===
- Kaizer Chiefs
- Amazulu
- Ajax Cape Town
- Golden Arrows

== Semi-finals ==
| Team 1 | Agg. | Team 2 | 1st leg | 2nd leg |
|---|---|---|---|---|
| Ajax Cape Town (South Africa) | 4 - 3 | (South Africa) Kaizer Chiefs | 1 - 0 | 3 - 3 |
| Amazulu (South Africa) | 1 - 4 | (South Africa) Golden Arrows | 1 - 2 | 0 - 2 |

=== 1st leg ===
15 August 2009

| Ajax Cape Town | 1–0 | Kaizer Chiefs |
|---|---|---|
| D. Selolwane 62' (pen.) | Report |

Newlands Stadium, Cape Town
16 August 2009

| Amazulu | 1–2 | Golden Arrows |
|---|---|---|
| L. Ngxabi 90' | Report | 61' R. Henyekane; 67' R. Henyekane |

Chatsworth Stadium, Durban

=== 2nd leg ===
22 August 2009
20:15

| Golden Arrows | 2–0 | Amazulu |
|---|---|---|
| J. Musonda 13'; N. Manqana 29' |

Chatsworth Stadium, Durban
23 August 2009
15:00

| Kaizer Chiefs | 3–3 | Ajax Cape Town |
|---|---|---|
| J. Torrealba 15'; J. Dladla 16'; S. Tshabalala 81' | | 11' B. Evans; 33' (pen.) B. Evans; 84' F. Cale |

Orlando Stadium, Johannesburg

== Final ==
24 October 2009
20:15

| Golden Arrows | 6–0 | Ajax Cape Town |
|---|---|---|
| N. Manqana 9' 90'; D. Ivanovs _{(Ajax)} 20' (o.g.); R. Henyekane 49'; T Mshengu 66'; N. Zothwane 73' |

Orlando Stadium, Johannesburg

== Top scorers ==
=== 3 goals ===
- (South Africa) Njabulo Manqana (Golden Arrows)
- (South Africa) Richard Henyekane (Golden Arrows)

=== 2 goals ===
- (South Africa) Brett Evans (Ajax Cape Town)
- (South Africa) Litha Ngxabi ()
- (Botswana) Dipsy Selolwane (Ajax Cape Town)

=== 1 goal ===
- (South Africa) Thokozani Mshengu (Golden Arrows)
- (South Africa) Nhlanhla Zothwane (Golden Arrows)
- (South Africa) Dennis Ivanovs (Golden Arrows)
- (South Africa) Franklin Cale (Ajax Cape Town)
- (South Africa) Siphiwe Tshabalala (Kaizer Chiefs)
- (South Africa) Josta Dladla (Kaizer Chiefs)
- (Venezuela) Jose Torrealba (Kaizer Chiefs)
- (Zambia) Joseph Musonda (Golden Arrows)
- (South Africa) Musa Bilankulu (Golden Arrows)
- (South Africa) Thulani Serero (Ajax Cape Town)
- (South Africa) Katlego Mashego (Orlando Pirates)
- (South Africa) Nathi Nhleko(Kaizer Chiefs)
- (South Africa) David Mathebula (Kaizer Chiefs)
- (Zimbabwe) Knowledge Musona (Kaizer Chiefs)
- (South Africa) Mark Haskins (Bidvest Wits)
- (South Africa) Ayanda Dlamini (AmaZulu F.C.)
- (South Africa) Thabo Mongalo (Supersport United)
- (Liberia) Anthony Laffor (Supersport United)
