= 2008 Telkom Knockout =

- Official logo

Tournament details
- Country: South Africa

Final positions
- Champions: Ajax Cape Town

Tournament statistics
- Matches played: 16
- Goals scored: 44 (2.75 per match)
- Top goal scorer: 3 Diyo Sibisi (Free State Stars)

The Telkom Knockout is a football (soccer) knockout competition which comprises the 16 teams in the South African Premier Soccer League.

In all matches there has to be a winner on the day, this will be decided if there is a winner after full-time (90 minutes). If teams are tied at full-time then extra time will be played, penalties will decide the winner if the scores are still even (there is no golden goal rule).

== Teams ==
The 16 teams that competed in the Telkom Knockout competition are: (listed in alphabetical order).

1. Ajax Cape Town
2. AmaZulu
3. Bay United
4. Bidvest Wits
5. Bloemfontein Celtic
6. Free State Stars
7. Lamontville Golden Arrows
8. Kaizer Chiefs
9. Mamelodi Sundowns
10. Maritzburg United
11. Moroka Swallows
12. Orlando Pirates
13. Platinum Stars
14. Santos
15. SuperSport United
16. Thanda Royal Zulu

== Prize money ==
- The Telkom Knockout is the highest paying cup competition in Africa with a grand total prize money of R 14 200 000.00.
- Each team taking part in the Telkom Knockout will receive a Participation Fee of R 250 000.00

=== First Round Losers ===
- Prize Money: R 200 000.00
- Participation Fee: R 250 000.00
- Total: R 450 000.00 for 8 teams each

=== Losing Quarterfinalists ===
- Prize Money: R 400 000.00
- Participation Fee: R 250 000.00
- Total: R 650 000.00 for 4 teams each

=== Losing Semi-Finalists ===
- Prize Money: R 750 000.00
- Participation Fee: R 250 000.00
- Total: R 1 000 000.00 for 2 teams each

=== Final – Runner-up ===
- Prize Money: R 1 500 000.00
- Participation Fee: R 250 000.00
- Total: R 1 750 000.00

=== Final – Winner ===
- Prize Money: R 4 000 000.00
- Participation Fee: R 250 000.00
- Total: R 4 250 000.00

=== Total prize money ===
- Total Prize Money: R 10 200 000.00
- Total Participation Fee: R 4 000 000.00
- Grand Total: R 14 200 000.00

== Results ==
=== First round ===
18 October 2008
15:00

Golden Arrows	4–1	Kaizer Chiefs
Richard Henyekane 4'; Mokete Tsotetsi (Chiefs) 22' (o.g.); Richard Henyekane 28'; Richard Henyekane 72'		85' Arthur Zwane

Chatsworth Stadium, Durban
18 October 2008
20:15

Ajax Cape Town	0–0 (a.e.t.)	Platinum Stars
Penalties
Evans (penalty scored); Cale (penalty missed); Carelse (penalty scored); Warley (penalty scored); Siwahla (penalty scored)	4–3	(penalty scored) Marumo; (penalty scored) Rentería; (penalty scored) Ramokala; (penalty missed) Lobo; (penalty missed) Ntwagae

Athlone Stadium, Cape Town
19 October 2008
15:00

AmaZulu	0–1	Supersport United
		51'Glen Salmon

Princess Magogo Stadium, Durban
19 October 2008
15:00

Bloemfontein Celtic	5–0	Santos
Patrick Malokase 41'; Mark Mayambela 45'; Patrick Malokase 67'; Patrick Malokase 73'; Soul Mmethi 95'

Seisa Ramabodu Stadium, Botshabelo
25 October 2008
15:00

Free State Stars	2–0	Maritzburg United
Diyo Sibisi 3'; Diyo Sibisi 83'

Welkom Rugby Stadium, Welkom
25 October 2008
20:00

Mamelodi Sundowns	0–1	Bay United
		14' Gareth Ncaca

Super Stadium, Pretoria
26 October 2008
15:00

Moroka Swallows	2–0	BidVest Wits
David Radebe 56'; Mark Haskins 91'

Olympia Park, Rustenburg
26 October 2008
15:00

Thanda Royal Zulu	0–1	Orlando Pirates
		66' Lebogang Mothibantwa

Chatsworth Stadium, Durban

=== Quarter-finals ===
- The draw was done on Monday 27 October 2008.
8 November 2008
15:00

Free State Stars	2–1	Bay United
Saitjheni Tsotesi 75'; Jimmy Kauleza 83'		55' Luntu Mazana

Charles Mopeli Stadium, Phuthaditjhaba
8 November 2008
20:00

Moroka Swallows	2–3	Orlando Pirates
Cecil Oerson 79'; Elton Morelato 90'		3' Thulasizwe Mbuyane; 31'Dikgang Mabalane; 61' Gilbert Mushangazhike

Olympia Park, Rustenburg
8 November 2008
15:00

Supersport United	2–2 (a.e.t.)	Bloemfontein Celtic
Katlego Mashego 20' (pen.); Keamogetse Wolff (Celtic) 45' (o.g.)		6' (o.g.) Rudi Isaacs (United); 59' (o.g.) Glen Salmon (United)
Penalties
Katza (penalty scored); Mashego (penalty missed); Isaacs (penalty scored); Pelembe (penalty scored); Mahoa (penalty missed)	3–4	(penalty scored) Mmethi; (penalty scored) Spandeel; (penalty scored) Nhlapo; (penalty scored) Kondowe

Super Stadium, Pretoria
8 November 2008
18:00

Ajax Cape Town	3–1	Golden Arrows
Mabhuti Khenyeza 60'; Sifiso Vilikazi 69'; Brett Evans 72'		72' Bonakele Twala

Athlone Stadium, Cape Town

=== Semi-finals ===
- The draw was done on Monday 10 November 2008.
29 November 2008
20:15

Bloemfontein Celtic	0–3	Orlando Pirates
		40' Lucas Thwala; 74' Benson Mhlongo; 86' Bennett Chenene

Chatsworth Stadium, Durban
30 November 2008
15:00

Free State Stars	2–3	Ajax Cape Town
Diyo Sibisi 14'; Clayton Daniels (Ajax) 65' (o.g.)		38' Sifiso Vilakazi; 41' Sifiso Vilakazi; 67' Sifiso Vilakazi

ABSA Stadium, East London

== Final ==
13 December 2008
20:15

Orlando Pirates	1–2	Ajax Cape Town
74' Siphelele Mthembu		10' Mabhuti Khanyeza; 15' Mabhuti Khanyeza

Chatsworth Stadium, Durban

Telkom Knockout
2008 Champions
Ajax Cape Town
(2nd title)

== Tournament Table ==
Round of 16
19 October 2008 Princess Magogo Stadium, Durban
AmaZulu	0
Supersport United	1
19 October 2008 Seisa Ramabodu Stadium, Botshabelo
Bloemfontein Celtic	5
Santos	0
26 October 2008 Olympia Park, Rustenburg
Moroka Swallows	2
Bidvest Wits	0
26 October 2008 Chatsworth Stadium, Durban
Thanda Royal Zulu	0
Orlando Pirates	1
25 October 2008 Welkom Rugby Stadium, Welkom
Free State Stars	2
Maritzburg United	0
25-10-1008 Super Stadium, Pretoria
Mamelodi Sundowns	0
Bay United	1
18 October 2008 Athlone Stadium, Cape Town
Ajax Cape Town	0(4)
Platinum Stars	0(3)
18 October 2008 Chatsworth Stadium, Durban
Golden Arrows	4
Kaizer Chiefs	1

Quarter-finals
8 November 2008 Super Stadium, Pretoria
Supersport United	2(3)
Bloemfontein Celtic	2(4)
8 November 2008 Olympia Park, Rustenburg
Moroka Swallows	2
Orlando Pirates	3
8 November 2008 Charles Mopeli Stadium, Phuthaditjhaba
Free State Stars	2
Bay United	1
8 November 2008 Athlone Stadium, Cape Town
Ajax Cape Town	3
Golden Arrows	1

Semi-finals
29 November 2008 Chatsworth Stadium, Durban
Bloemfontein Celtic	0
Orlando Pirates	3
30 November 2008 ABSA Stadium, East London
Free State Stars	2
Ajax Cape Town	3

Final
13 December 2008 Chatsworth Stadium, Durban
Orlando Pirates	1
Ajax Cape Town	2

== Top scorers ==
Scorer	Club	Goals
(South Africa) Diyo Sibisi	Free State Stars	3
(South Africa) Richard Henyekane	Golden Arrows	3
(South Africa) Patrick Malokase	Bloemfontein Celtic	3
(South Africa) Sifiso Vilakazi	Ajax Cape Town	3
(South Africa) Mabhuti Khanyeza	Ajax Cape Town	2
(South Africa) Arthur Zwane	Kaizer Chiefs	1
(South Africa) Glen Salmon	Supersport United	1
(South Africa) Mark Mayambela	Bloemfontein Celtic	1
(South Africa) Soul Mmethi	Bloemfontein Celtic	1
(South Africa) Gareth Ncaca	Bay United	1
(South Africa) David Radebe	Moroka Swallows	1
(South Africa) Mark Haskins	Moroka Swallows	1
(South Africa) Lebohang Mothibantwa	Orlando Pirates	1
