= 2008–09 Nedbank Cup =

ke yona (the one)
- Official Logo

Tournament details
- Country: South Africa
- Teams: 32

Final positions
- Champions: Moroka Swallows

Tournament statistics
- Matches played: 28
- Goals scored: 78 (2.79 per match)
- Top goal scorer(s): 3 goals Serero (Ajax Cape Town)

Nedbank Cup is a South African club football (soccer) tournament. The knockout tournament, based on the English FA Cup format, carries a 'David versus Goliath' theme. The competition was sponsored by ABSA until 2007, after which Nedbank took over sponsorship.

== Format ==
The 16 Premiership clubs, 8 National First Division teams, as well as 8 teams from the amateur ranks compete for the prize money of R6 million. The winner also qualifies for the CAF Confederation Cup.

The teams are not seeded at any stage, and the first 16 sides drawn out of the hat receive a home-ground advantage. There are no longer any replays in the tournament, and any games which end in a draw after 90 minutes are subject to 30 minutes extra time followed by penalties if necessary.

== Teams ==
The 32 teams competing in the Nedbank Cup competition are: (listed according to the league that they are playing in).

=== Premier Soccer League ===
1. Ajax Cape Town
2. AmaZulu
3. Bay United
4. Bidvest Wits
5. Bloemfontein Celtic
6. Free State Stars
7. Golden Arrows
8. Kaizer Chiefs
9. Mamelodi Sundowns
10. Maritzburg United
11. Moroka Swallows
12. Orlando Pirates
13. Platinum Stars
14. Santos
15. Supersport United
16. Thanda Royal Zulu

=== National First Division ===
1. Carara Kicks
2. Black Leopards
3. Ikapa Sporting
4. Durban Stars
5. Mpumalanga Black Aces
6. Winners Park
7. Nathi Lions
8. Pretoria University

=== Vodacom League ===
1. Blackburn Rovers
2. Thistle Groove
3. Maluti FET College
4. Newcastle Sicillians
5. Peace Lovers
6. Real Madrid
7. Milano United
8. Garankuwa United

== Results ==
=== Preliminary round ===
The preliminary round saw the National First Division sides play each other is a knockout round to decide who will compete in the 2009 Nedbank Cup. All the game were played on 16 December 2008 and the winners of each game went into the draw to determine the fixtures for the first round.

16 December 2008

| Pretoria University National First Division | 1–0 | Jomo Cosmos National First Division |

16 December 2008

| Carara Kicks National First Division | 1–0 | Vasco Da Gama National First Division |

16 December 2008

| Hanover Park National First Division | 1–2 | Black Leopards National First Division |

16 December 2008

| Dynamos National First Division | 2–3 | Durban Stars National First Division |

16 December 2008

| Nathi Lions National First Division | 3–2 | Witbank Spurs National First Division |

16 December 2008

| Winners Park National First Division | 1–0 | FC Cape Town National First Division |

16 December 2008

| Mpumalanga Black Aces National First Division | 5–2 | African Warriors National First Division |

16 December 2008

| Ikapa Sporting National First Division | 3–1 | FC AK National First Division |

=== Bracket ===
Round of 32
Ikapa Sporting | 2
Durban Stars | 0
Maluti FET College | 1
Winners Park | 2
Nathi Lions | 1(7)
Garankuwa United | 1(6)
Thistle Groove | 0
Ajax Cape Town | 3
Blackburn Rovers | 2
Pretoria University | 4
Kaizer Chiefs | 1
Free State Stars | 0
Mpumalanga Black Aces | 0(2)
Bloemfontein Celtic | 0(4)
Orlando Pirates | 2
Supersport United | 0
Peace Lovers | 1
Real Madrid | 0
Moroka Swallows | 3
Bidvest Wits | 1
Santos | 2
Milano United | 1
Maritzburg United | 3
Thanda Royal Zulu | 2
Newcastle Sicillians | 2(1)
Bay United | 2(3)
Black Leopards | 1
AmaZulu | 0
Carara Kicks | 1
Mamelodi Sundowns | 3
Platinum Stars | 1(5)
Golden Arrows | 1(3)

Round of 16
Ikapa Sporting | 1
Winners Park | 2
Nathi Lions | 0
Ajax Cape Town | 1
Pretoria University | 4
Kaizer Chiefs | 3
Bloemfontein Celtic | 2
Orlando Pirates | 1
Peace Lovers | 0
Moroka Swallows | 4
Santos | 1
Maritzburg United | 2
Bay United | 1(4)
Black Leopards | 1(5)
Mamelodi Sundowns | 0
Platinum Stars | 1

Quarter-finals
Winners Park | 3(2)
Ajax Cape Town | 3(4)
Pretoria University | 1
Bloemfontein Celtic | 0
Moroka Swallows | 2
Maritzburg United | 0
Black Leopards | 3
Platinum Stars | 0

Semi-finals
Ajax Cape Town | 1
Pretoria University | 2
Moroka Swallows | 2
Black Leopards | 1

Finals
Pretoria University | 0
Moroka Swallows | 1

=== First round (round of 32) ===
7 March 2009
15:00

| Black Leopards National First Division | 1–0 | AmaZulu Premier Soccer League |
|---|---|---|
| Ramulondi 88' | Report |

Tshifulanani Stadium, Tshifulanani
7 March 2009
15:00

| Blackburn Rovers Vodacom League | 2 – 4 (a.e.t.) | Pretoria University National First Division |
|---|---|---|
| Themba Maloyi 67'; Themba Maloyi 89' | Report | 40' Mongala; 55' Ndhlovu; 95' Mthokozisi Yende; 96' Sekotlong |

ABSA Stadium, East London
7 March 2009
15:00

| Carara Kicks National First Division | 1–3 | Mamelodi Sundowns Premier Soccer League |
|---|---|---|
| Olubambiro 20' | Report | 72' 84' Moriri; 90' Mphela |

Griffons Rugby Stadium, Welkom
7 March 2009
15:00

| Ikapa Sporting National First Division | 2–0 | Durban Stars National First Division |
|---|---|---|
| August 40'; Warley 70' | Report |

Erica Park, Cape Town
7 March 2009
18:00

| Thistle Groove Vodacom League | 0–3 | Ajax Cape Town Premier Soccer League |
|---|---|---|
| | Report | 14' 43' Serero; 78' Cale |

Thulamahashe Stadium, Bushbuckridge
7 March 2009
20:15

| Platinum Stars Premier Soccer League | 1–1 | Golden Arrows Premier Soccer League |
|---|---|---|
| Grobler 62' | Report | 86' Phakathi |
Penalties
| | 5–3 |

Olen Park, Potchefstroom
7 March 2009
20:15

| Orlando Pirates Premier Soccer League | 2–0 | Supersport United Premier Soccer League |
|---|---|---|
| Mashego 41'; Modise 71' | Report |

Coca-Cola Park, Johannesburg

8 March 2009
15:00

| Mpumalanga Black Aces National First Division | 0–0 | Bloemfontein Celtic Premier Soccer League |
|---|---|---|
| | Report |
Penalties
| | 2–4 |

Ackerville Stadium, Witbank
8 March 2009
15:00

| Maluti FET College Vodacom League | 1–2 | Winners Park National First Division |
|---|---|---|
| April 22' | Report | 32' (o.g.) Matsoele; 56' Malesa |

Charles Mopeli, Phuthaditjhaba
8 March 2009
15:00

| Kaizer Chiefs Premier Soccer League | 1 – 0 (a.e.t.) | Free State Stars Premier Soccer League |
|---|---|---|
| Zwane 113' | Report |

Super Stadium, Atteridgeville
8 March 2009
15:00

| Maritzburg United Premier Soccer League | 3–2 | Thanda Royal Zulu Premier Soccer League |
|---|---|---|
| Dhladhla 4'; Davids 45'; Aka 93' | Report | 30' Ngema; 66' Mulenga |

Woodburn Stadium, Pietermaritzburg
8 March 2009
15:00

| Newcastle Sicillians Vodacom League | 2–2 | Bay United Premier Soccer League |
|---|---|---|
| Madi 34'; Masuku 67' | Report | 7' Chalwe; 44' Ngangqu |
Penalties
| | 1–3 |

Arbo Park
8 March 2009
15:00

| Nathi Lions National First Division | 1–1 | Garankuwa United Vodacom League |
|---|---|---|
| Gumede 58' | Report | 83' Mapumutha |
Penalties
| | 7–6 |

Chatsworth Stadium, Durban

11 March 2009
19:30

| Santos Premier Soccer League | 2–1 | Milano United Vodacom League |
|---|---|---|
| Chimodzi 56'; Scott 86' | Report | 44' Powell |

Athlone Stadium, Cape Town
11 March 2009
19:30

| Moroka Swallows Premier Soccer League | 3–1 | Bidvest Wits Premier Soccer League |
|---|---|---|
| Tsutsulupa 74'; Rancan 110'; Ndlovu 117' | Report | Langerman 90' |

Olympia Park, Rustenburg
11 March 2009
19:30

| Peace Lovers Vodacom League | 1–0 | Real Madrid Vodacom League |
|---|---|---|
| Machete 56' | Report |

Peter Mokaba Stadium, Polokwane

==== Teams Qualified for Second round ====
1. Black Leopards (NFD)
2. Pretoria University (NFD)
3. Mamelodi Sundowns (PSL)
4. Ikapa Sporting (NFD)
5. Ajax Cape Town (PSL)
6. Platinum Stars (PSL)
7. Orlando Pirates (PSL)
8. Bloemfontein Celtic (PSL)
9. Winners Park (NFD)
10. Kaizer Chiefs (PSL)
11. Maritzburg United (PSL)
12. Bay United (PSL)
13. Nathi Lions (NFD)
14. Santos (PSL)
15. Moroka Swallows (PSL)
16. Peace Lovers (Vodacom League)

=== Second round (round of 16) ===
Orlando Pirates have been handed a tricky tie in the Last 16 of the Nedbank Cup, but Kaizer Chiefs will back their chances against First Division side AmaTuks.

Bucs will travel to Bloemfontein to face Bloemfontein Celtic.

Chiefs have been paired with Pretoria University, while Mamelodi Sundowns faced Miguel Gamondi's Platinum Stars.

Peace Lovers, the last remaining Vodacom League side in the draw, have been rewarded for their win against Real Madrid with a home tie against Moroka Swallows.

The continued unavailability of venues due to preparations for the 2009 Fifa Confederations and 2010 World Cup is giving several clubs a king size headache just hours after the Nedbank Cup Last 16 draw.

20 March 2009
20:00

| Santos Premier Soccer League | 1–2 (a.e.t.) | Maritzburg United Premier Soccer League |
|---|---|---|
| Arendse 20' (pen.) | | 62' Mkhonza; 117' Davids |

Athlone Stadium, Cape Town

21 March 2009
15:00

| Ikapa Sporting National First Division | 1–2 | Winners Park National First Division |
|---|---|---|
| Warley 84' | | 34' (pen.) Phadu; 71' Chauke |

Erica Park, Cape Town
21 March 2009
15:00

| Bay United Premier Soccer League | 1–1 | Black Leopards National First Division |
|---|---|---|
| Ncaca 75' | | 66' Mongale |
Penalties
| | 4–5 |

ABSA Stadium, East London
21 March 2009
20:15

| Bloemfontein Celtic Premier Soccer League | 2–1 | Orlando Pirates Premier Soccer League |
|---|---|---|
| Molokase 77'; Smith 87' | | 11' Mthembu |

Olen Park, Potchefstroom
21 March 2009
20:15

| Pretoria University National First Division | 4–3 | Kaizer Chiefs Premier Soccer League |
|---|---|---|
| Yende 24'; Mongala 65'; Moleko 70'; Mongala 86' | | 28' Dladla; 42' Torrealba; 82' Tshabalala |

Super Stadium, Atteridgeville

22 March 2009
15:00

| Nathi Lions National First Division | 0–1 | Ajax Cape Town Premier Soccer League |
|---|---|---|
| | | 50' Cale |

Chatsworth Stadium, Durban
22 March 2009
15:00

| Mamelodi Sundowns Premier Soccer League | 0–1 | Platinum Stars Premier Soccer League |
|---|---|---|
| | | 93' Rentería |

Super Stadium, Pretoria
22 March 2009
17:00

| Peace Lovers Vodacom League | 0–4 | Moroka Swallows Premier Soccer League |
|---|---|---|
| | | 38' 48' Haskins; 45' Ndlovu; 59' Oerson |

Peter Mokaba Stadium, Polokwane

==== Teams Qualified for Quarter-finals ====
1. Maritzburg United (PSL)
2. Winners Park (NFD)
3. Black Leopards (NFD)
4. Bloemfontein Celtic (PSL)
5. Pretoria University (NFD)
6. Ajax Cape Town (PSL)
7. Platinum Stars (PSL)
8. Moroka Swallows (PSL)

=== Quarter-finals ===
Only the strongest have survived to reach the Nedbank Cup quarterfinals draw held in Johannesburg on the morning of 23 March 2009.

The draw was without the big three teams.

Defending champions Mamelodi Sundowns were knocked out by a gallant Platinum Stars on Sunday afternoon 22 March 2009.

Sundowns' exit was not the only shock of the tournament, as Kaizer Chiefs lost to First Division team Pretoria University and Pirates also lost to Bloemfontein Celtic.

11 April 2009
15:00

| Winners Park National First Division | 3–3 (a.e.t.) | Ajax Cape Town Premier Soccer League |
|---|---|---|
| Tshepo Malesa 5'; Ndumiso Mabena 84'; Desmond Chauke 93' | | 14' (pen.) Mhabuthi Khenyeza; 80' Thulani Serero; 95' Franklin Cale |
Penalties
| Mabena (penalty missed); Phadu (penalty scored); Mulaudzi (penalty scored); Mwandile (penalty missed) | 2–4 | (penalty scored) Evans; (penalty scored) Cale; (penalty scored) Ngobeni; (penalty scored) Kubeka |

Seshego Stadium, Polokwane
11 April 2009
20:15

| Pretoria University National First Division | 1–0 | Bloemfontein Celtic Premier Soccer League |
|---|---|---|
| Thulani Notyhawe 84' |

Pretoria University Stadium, Pretoria

12 April 2009
15:00

| Black Leopards National First Division | 3–0 | Platinum Stars Premier Soccer League |
|---|---|---|
| Thabo Mongalo 67' 72'; Luyololo Mapolisa 82' |

Tshifulanani Stadium, Thulamela
12 April 2009
17:00

| Moroka Swallows Premier Soccer League | 2–0 | Maritzburg United Premier Soccer League |
|---|---|---|
| Mark Haskins 72'; Sandile Ndlovu 84' |

Germiston Stadium, Germiston

==== Teams Qualified for Semi-finals ====
1. Ajax Cape Town (PSL)
2. Pretoria University (NFD)
3. Black Leopards (NFD)
4. Moroka Swallows (PSL)

=== Semi-finals ===
On Tuesday 14 April 2009 the first Division giant killers Pretoria University drew their third successive Premier Soccer League side in the form of Ajax Cape Town when the draw for the semifinal of the country's biggest knockout competition was made.

In the other semifinal another First Division giant killer, Black Leopards, will play Moroka Swallows.

25 April 2009
20:15

| Moroka Swallows Premier Soccer League | 2–1 | Black Leopards National First Division |
|---|---|---|
| Igor Alves 76'; Thulani Ngcepe 88' | | 90+1' Jabu Maluleke |

Peter Mokaba Stadium, Polokwane
26 April 2009
15:00

| Ajax Cape Town Premier Soccer League | 1–2 (a.e.t.) | Pretoria University National First Division |
|---|---|---|
| Nhlanhla Kubeka 101' | | 97' Mthokozisi Yende; 110' Manti Moholo |

Bidvest Stadium, Johannesburg
- Late goals from Igor Alves and Thulani Ngcepe were enough to see Moroka Swallows defeat Black Leopards 2–1 at the Peter Mokaba Stadium on Saturday evening and book their place in the Nedbank Cup final.
- First division side Pretoria University beat Ajax Cape Town 2–1 after extra time in the semifinal of the Nedbank Cup. All the goals in this entertaining clash were scored in extra time. Tukkies will now face Moroka Swallows in the Nedbank Cup final on 23 May. The cup tie was played at Johannesburg's BidVest Wits Stadium on Sunday afternoon.

=== Finals ===
23 May 2009
15:00

| Pretoria University National First Division | 0–1 | Moroka Swallows Premier Soccer League |
|---|---|---|
| | | 21' Vinicius Da Silva |

Rand Stadium, Johannesburg

== Top Goal scorers ==
| Scorer | Club | Goals |
|---|---|---|
| (South Africa) Thulani Serero | Ajax Cape Town | 3 |
| (South Africa) Thabo Mongalo | Black Leopards | 3 |
| (South Africa) Mark Haskins | Moroka Swallows | 3 |
| (South Africa) Phenyo Mongala | Pretoria University | 3 |
| (South Africa) Tsepo Malesa | Winners Park | 2 |
| (South Africa) Themba Maloyi | Blackburn Rovers | 2 |
| (South Africa) Surprise Moriri | Mamelodi Sundowns | 2 |
| (South Africa) Sandile Ndlovu | Moroka Swallows | 2 |
| (South Africa) Mthokozisi Yende | Pretoria University | 2 |
| (South Africa) Franklin Cale | Ajax Cape Town | 2 |
| (South Africa) Fadlu Davids | Maritzburg United | 2 |
| (South Africa) Dennis Chauke | Winners Park | 2 |
| 56 different players | scored 1 goal each. | 1 |
| Total goals scored in | 2009 Nedbank Cup. | 84 |
