= 2008–09 South African Premiership =

13th Season of the top soccer league in South Africa

Premiership
- Season: 2008–09
- Champions: Supersport United; 2nd Premiership title
- Relegated: Thanda Royal Zulu; Bay United
- 2010 CAF Champions League: Supersport United; Orlando Pirates
- 2010 CAF Confederation Cup: Moroka Swallows (via domestic cup)
- Matches: 240
- Goals: 569 (2.37 per match)
- Top goalscorer: Richard Henyekane (19)
- Biggest home win: Bloemfontein Celtic 6–1 Thanda Royal Zulu (25 Jan 2009)
- Biggest away win: Platinum Stars 0–6 Golden Arrows (18 Mar 2009)
- Highest scoring: Bidvest Wits 6–2 Thanda Royal Zulu (18 Feb 2009) (8 goals)
- Average attendance: 7,416

The 2008–09 South African Premiership, known as the ABSA Premiership for sponsorship purposes, and also commonly referred to as the PSL after the governing body, was the thirteenth season of the Premiership since its establishment in 1996.

Supersport United were the defending champions, having won their first Premiership title on the final day of the previous season. The campaign began in August 2008, ended in May 2009. A total of 16 teams contested in the league, 14 of which contested in the 2007–08 season, and two of which were promoted from the National First Division.

== Season summary ==
SuperSport United defended their title to win their second consecutive Premiership title.

Orlando Pirates came close to taking the title in the final two games. Having drawn their penultimate game 1–1 against SuperSport, it went into the final game with SuperSport on 54 points - sitting two points clear with a superior goal difference. Pirates won their game against Amazulu 3–1, while SuperSport and Santos played out a goalless draw. Both teams were tied at the top of the points table with 55 points each.

SuperSport United won the league due to a greater goal difference, with +23 goals over Orlando Pirates's +17 goals.

Bay United were relegated to the National League after finishing at the bottom of the table on 21 points. Thanda Royal Zulu entered a playoff with teams from the National League to determine if they would retain their place in the Premiership or be relegated to the National League after ending 15th on the league table with 33 points.

Bloemfontein Celtic survived relegation on goal difference, ending 14th on the league table with 33 points. They were tied with Thanda Royal Zulu, but their goal difference were greater than that of Thanda Royal Zulu.

== Clubs ==
- Ajax Cape Town
- AmaZulu
- Bay United
- Bidvest Wits
- Bloemfontein Celtic
- Free State Stars
- Golden Arrows
- Kaizer Chiefs
- Mamelodi Sundowns
- Maritzburg United
- Moroka Swallows
- Orlando Pirates
- Platinum Stars
- Santos
- Supersport United
- Thanda Royal Zulu

== Promotion and relegation ==
=== Pre-Season ===
Teams promoted from 2007–08 National First Division

- Champions (Coastal Stream): Maritzburg United
- Play-offs: Bay United

Teams relegated to 2008–09 National First Division

- Last in Premiership: Black Leopards
- Play-offs: Jomo Cosmos

=== Post-Season ===
Semifinals
1	Carara Kicks	1	1	2
2	Mpumalanga Black Aces	1	2	3
15	Thanda Royal Zulu	0	1	1
2	F.C. Cape Town	0	1	1

Final
2	Mpumalanga Black Aces	0	3	3
15	Thanda Royal Zulu	0	0	0

- Champions of the Inland Stream Jomo Cosmos took on Champions of the Costal Stream Carara Kicks in a two leg playoff for promotion to the Premiership.
- The first leg of the play-off saw the match end in a goalless draw at the Charles Mopeli Stadium on 7 May 2009.
- The second leg of the play-off saw Jomo Cosmos win Carara Kicks 2 – 1 at Vaal Technikon on 10 May 2009 to see Jomo Cosmos promoted to the Premiership.
- Thanda Royal Zulu who finished 15th on the Premiership table will go into a mini play-off tournament with Carara Kicks (who lost their play-off match with Jomo Cosmos), Mpumalanga Black Aces (who finished second in the Inland Stream) and F.C. Cape Town (who finished second in the Costal Stream).
- Carara Kicks will face Mpumalanga Black Aces and Thanda Royal Zulu will face F.C. Cape Town

Teams promoted from 2008 to 2009 National First Division

- Champions (Inland Stream) Jomo Cosmos
- Play-offs: Mpumalanga Black Aces

Teams relegated to 2009–10 National First Division

- Last in Premiership: Bay United
- Play-offs: Thanda Royal Zulu

== League table ==
2008 Premiership
Pos	Team	Pld	W	D	L	GF	GA	GD	Pts	Qualification or relegation
1	Supersport United (C)	30	16	7	7	45	22	+23	55	2010 CAF Champions League
2	Orlando Pirates	30	15	10	5	37	20	+17	55	2010 CAF Champions League
3	Kaizer Chiefs	30	15	5	10	37	32	+5	50	
4	Free State Stars	30	12	11	7	38	24	+14	47	
5	Golden Arrows	30	13	7	10	44	28	+16	46	
6	Bidvest Wits	30	13	7	10	42	33	+9	46	
7	Ajax Cape Town	30	13	7	10	36	34	+2	46	
8	AmaZulu	30	12	6	12	33	33	0	42	
9	Mamelodi Sundowns	30	11	7	12	28	28	0	40	
10	Santos	30	10	9	11	28	31	−3	39	
11	Moroka Swallows	29	10	7	12	32	39	−7	37	2010 CAF Confederation Cup
12	Maritzburg United	30	10	6	14	34	53	−19	36	
13	Platinum Stars	30	8	11	11	35	40	−5	35	
14	Bloemfontein Celtic	30	8	9	13	34	38	−4	33	
15	Thanda Royal Zulu (R)	30	10	3	17	40	58	−18	33	Qualification for the relegation play-offs
16	Bay United (R)	30	5	6	19	26	56	−30	21	Relegated to National First Division

Updated to match(es) played on 10 May 2009. Source:
Rules for classification: Three points for a win and one point for a draw.
(C) 2008–09 Premiership Champions; (R) Relegated

== Results ==
Home \ Away	AJX	AMZ	BAY	BVW	BLC	FSS	GOL	KZC	MLS	MAR	MOR	ORL	PLA	SAN	SUP	TRZ
Ajax Cape Town		0–0	4–1	2–1	2–0	2–1	0–1	0–0	1–0	1–1	0–1	1–1	1–1	1–1	1–0	5–2
AmaZulu	2–0		3–1	0–0	1–0	0–1	2–0	0–0	1–2	1–2	1–2	0–0	0–1	1–0	2–1	1–0
Bay United	1–3	1–1		2–1	1–1	0–1	0–1	0–2	2–0	1–2	1–1	2–0	0–3	0–1	0–1	1–2
Bidvest Wits	1–0	2–3	5–0		1–1	1–0	0–2	1–4	1–2	4–1	2–0	0–2	1–0	2–0	0–0	6–2
Bloemfontein Celtic	2–1	0–2	3–0	1–2		1–0	1–0	0–1	0–1	0–0	4–1	1–1	2–0	1–0	0–0	6–1
Free State Stars	3–0	3–2	3–2	1–1	5–1		0–0	2–0	1–1	1–1	1–2	1–1	0–0	1–0	4–1	2–0
Golden Arrows	4–0	0–1	1–2	2–3	1–1	1–1		0–1	0–1	5–2	0–0	1–0	1–1	3–1	0–2	2–2
Kaizer Chiefs	2–0	3–0	3–3	2–1	2–1	0–0	1–0		1–0	1–0	1–2	0–2	2–2	0–3	0–3	1–2
Mamelodi Sundowns	0–2	3–0	1–2	2–0	1–0	0–0	2–4	0–1		3–0	0–1	0–0	0–2	2–1	1–4	2–0
Maritzburg United	2–0	2–1	2–1	2–1	3–1	1–1	0–1	3–2	0–3		3–1	1–2	2–2	1–0	1–3	0–2
Moroka Swallows	2–4	0–1	1–1	0–1	2–2	0–2	0–1	2–0	0–0	2–1		2–1	0–0	0–1	1–1	3–1
Orlando Pirates	0–1	3–1	1–1	0–0	3–0	1–0	1–0	2–1	2–0	2–1	1–0		1–0	1–1	0–1	4–2
Platinum Stars	1–1	3–2	2–0	0–1	2–2	0–0	0–6	0–2	0–0	4–0	2–1	1–2		4–1	1–3	1–4
Santos	1–2	1–1	3–0	1–1	1–1	2–0	0–3	2–1	0–0	2–0	0–3	0–0	1–1		0–0	2–1
SuperSport United	2–0	2–0	3–0	1–1	1–0	1–0	1–2	0–1	1–1	5–0	2–0	1–1	2–0	0–1		1–3
Thanda Royal Zulu	0–1	0–3	1–0	0–1	2–1	2–3	2–2	1–2	1–0	0–0	4–2	0–2	2–1	0–1	1–2	

Source: Premier Soccer League
Legend: Blue = home team win; Yellow = draw; Red = away team win.

== PSL Awards ==
Teko Modise was the biggest winner at the annual Premier Soccer League awards dinner on 24 May 2009 at Gold Reef City Casino, pocketing a whopping R400 000 after he was named Footballer of the Year and Players' Player of the Year.

It was the second time that the Orlando Pirates midfielder bagged the coveted Footballer of the Year honour, following his controversial win last season. This time, however, Modise's brilliance from the unusual left of midfield position helped Pirates mount a championship bid.

Lucas Thwala, who earlier this month was named Pirates' Player of the Season ahead of Modise, was named the Premiership Player of the Year.

Ajax Cape Town's Franklin Cale won the award for the Telkom Knockout Player of the Tournament.

Award	Winner	Club	Prize money
Premier League Champions	Supersport United	-	R10 000 000
Footballer of the Season	Teko Modise	Orlando Pirates	R 250 000
Premiership Player of the Season	Lucas Thwala	Orlando Pirates	R 150 000
Players' Player of the Season	Teko Modise	Orlando Pirates	R 150 000
Young Player of the Season	Bongani Khumalo	Supersport United	R 50 000
Goalkeeper of the Season	Kennedy Mweene	Free State Stars	R 50 000
Top Goal Scorer of the Season	Richard Henyekane	Golden Arrows	R75 000
Goal of the Season	Ryan Botha	Moroka Swallows	R 50 000
Chairman's Award	Andre Arendse & John Maduka	Supersport United & Bloemfontein Celtic	Share; R 100 000
Coach of the Season	Gavin Hunt	Supersport United	R75 000
Referee of the Season	Jerome Damon	-	R 50 000
MTN8 Player of the Tournament	Gert Schalkwyk	Kaizer Chiefs	R 150 000
Nedbank Cup Player of the Tournament	Mthokozisi Yende	Pretoria University	R 100 000
Telkom Knockout Player of the Tournament	Franklin Cale	Ajax Cape Town	R 200 000

== Statistics ==
=== Top goalscorers ===
As of May 23, 2009

19 goals

- (South Africa) Richard Henyekane (Golden Arrows)

16 goals

- (South Africa) Mabhuti Khenyeza (Ajax Cape Town)

10 goals

- (Colombia) Luis Rentería (Platinum Stars)
- (South Africa) Surprise Moriri (Mamelodi Sundowns)
- (Liberia) Anthony Laffor (SuperSport United)
- (South Africa) Bernard Parker (Thanda Royal Zulu)
- (South Africa) Sthembiso Ngcobo (Free State Stars)

9 goals

- (South Africa) Dumisani Ngwenya (AmaZulu)
- (South Africa) Katlego Mashego (Orlando Pirates)
- (South Africa) Gert Schalkwyk (Bloemfontein Celtic)
- (South Africa) Bradley Ritson (AmaZulu)

8 goals

- (Mozambique) Elias Pelembe (SuperSport United)
- (South Africa) Lucas Thwala (Orlando Pirates)
- (South Africa) Nkosinathi Nhleko (SuperSport United)

== Premiership managers ==
Manager	Club	Appointed
(South Africa) Craig Rosslee	Ajax Cape Town	July 2007
(South Africa) Clive Barker	AmaZulu	July 2007
(South Africa) Khabo Zondo	Bay United	November 2008
(South Africa) Roger De Sa	Bidvest Wits	June 2007
(South Africa) Owen Da Gama	Bloemfontein Celtic	
(South Africa) Steve Komphela	Free State Stars	
(South Africa) Manqoba Mngqithi	Golden Arrows	January 2007
(South Africa) Fani Madida	Kaizer Chiefs	May 2009
(Romania) Ted Dumitru	Mamelodi Sundowns	March 2009
(South Africa) Gordon Igesund	Maritzburg United	July 2008
(Brazil) Júlio César Leal	Moroka Swallows	July 2008
(Netherlands) Ruud Krol	Orlando Pirates	July 2008
(Botswana) David Bright	Santos	January 2008
(Argentina) Miguel Gamondi	Platinum Stars	December 2007
(South Africa) Gavin Hunt	Supersport United	June 2007
(Sweden) Roger Palmgren	Thanda Royal Zulu	August 2007

== Kits 2008–2009 ==
Team	Supplier	Shirt sponsor
Ajax CT	Adidas	MTN
AmaZulu	Reebok	SPAR
Bay United	Puma	Vacant
Bidvest Wits	Hummel	Bidvest
Bloemfontein Celtic	Reebok	Vodacom
Engen Santos	Canterbury	Engen
Free State Stars	Umbro	Bonitas
Golden Arrows	Umbro	MTN
Kaizer Chiefs	Nike	Vodacom
Mamelodi Sundowns	Nike	Vacant
Maritzburg United	Joma	Vacant
Moroka Swallows	Mitre	VW
Orlando Pirates	Adidas	Vodacom
Platinum Stars	Diadora	Dunns
Supersport United	Diadora	DStv
Thanda Royal Zulu	Lotto	Vacant

== Dec 2008/Jan 2009 Transfer Window ==
Name	Last registration	To club
Tsweu Mokoro	Moroka Swallows	Ajax Cape Town
Tawfeeq Salie	Ajax Cape Town	Ajax Cape Town
Stanton Lewis	Unspecified	Ajax Cape Town
Thamsanqa Sangweni	Unspecified	AmaZulu
Bradley Ritson	AmaZulu	AmaZulu
Jean Njoh	Unspecified	Bay United
Nhlanhla Vilakazi	Golden Arrows	Bay United
Bulelani Matross	Hanover Park	Bay United
Samuel Ramosoeu	Bidboys	Bidvest Wits
Tebogo Langerman	Bidboys	Bidvest Wits
Calvin Kadi	Supersport United	Bidvest Wits

== Attendances ==
No.	Club	Average
1	Kaizer Chiefs	18,935
2	Bloemfontein Celtic	15,969
3	Orlando Pirates	15,869
4	Bay United	7,869
5	Ajax Cape Town	7,229
6	Mamelodi Sundowns	7,695
7	AmaZulu	5,835
8	Free State Stars	5,462
9	Engen Santos	5,015
10	Maritzburg United	4,969
11	SuperSport United	4,902
12	Lamontville Golden Arrows	4,635
13	Moroka Swallows	4,582
14	Thanda Royal Zulu	4,302
15	Bidvest Wits	3,015
16	Platinum Stars	2,981
