= 2008 MTN 8 =

Tournament details
- Country: South Africa
- Teams: 8

Final positions
- Champions: Kaizer Chiefs (14th title)
- Runners-up: Mamelodi Sundowns

Tournament statistics
- Matches played: 9
- Goals scored: 26 (2.89 per match)
- Top goal scorer: 3 Gert Schalkwyk (Kaizer Chiefs)

The 2008 MTN 8 kicked off on the weekend of 9 August with the first two quarterfinals being played on Saturday and Sunday, and the next round of quarterfinals were played on the weekend of the 16 and 17 August. The first leg of the semifinals took place on 23 and 24 August and the second leg on the weekend of 30 August. The finals were scheduled for 21 September, but the pitch was waterlogged due to heavy rain over that week. The finals were rescheduled for two days later on 23 September at the ABSA Stadium (Kings Park) in Durban.

== Teams ==
The eight teams that competed in the MTN 8 Wafa Wafa knockout competition are: (listed according to their finishing position in the 2007–08 Premiership season.

1. SuperSport United
2. Ajax Cape Town
3. Santos
4. Mamelodi Sundowns
5. Free State Stars
6. Kaizer Chiefs
7. Moroka Swallows
8. Orlando Pirates

== Quarter-finals ==
8 August 2008

Orlando Pirates	1–2	Supersport United
Thembile Kanono 7'		Fikru Tefera 21'; Anthony Laffor 82'

Coca-Cola Park, Johannesburg
9 August 2008

Moroka Swallows	4–3	Ajax Cape Town
Lefa Tsutsulupa 8'; Sandile Ndlovu 37'; Morgan Shivambu 99'; Ryan Botha 119'		Brett Evans 49'; Eduardo Ferreira 90'; Mabhuti Khenyeza 120'

Olympia Park, Rustenburg
9 August 2008

Kaizer Chiefs	4–0	Santos
Gert Schalkwyk 4' 26'; Jose Torrealba 21'; Reneilwe Letsholonyane 58'

Loftus Versfeld, Pretoria
10 August 2008

Mamelodi Sundowns	1–0	Free State Stars
Katlego Mphela 98'

Super Stadium, Pretoria

== Semi-finals ==
=== 1st leg ===
16 August 2008

Kaizer Chiefs	2–0	Moroka Swallows
Gert Schalkwyk 9'; Jose Torrealba 21'

Loftus Versfeld, Pretoria

17 August 2008

Mamelodi Sundowns	2–1	Supersport United
Jorge Acuna 11'; Surprise Moriri 58'		Brent Carelse 45'

Super Stadium, Pretoria

=== 2nd leg ===
23 August 2008

Supersport United	3–2	Mamelodi Sundowns
Daine Klate 55' 92'; Brent Carelse 90'		Surprise Moriri 85'; Lerato Chabangu 118'

Super Stadium, Pretoria
24 August 2008

Moroka Swallows	1–0	Kaizer Chiefs
Ryan Botha 49'

Olympia Park, Rustenburg

Team 1	Agg.	Team 2	1st leg	2nd leg
Kaizer Chiefs (South Africa)	2–1	(South Africa) Moroka Swallows	2–0	0–1
Mamelodi Sundowns (South Africa)	4–4	(South Africa) Supersport United	2–1	2–3

- Mamelodi Sundowns went through to the finals on aggregate due to their away goals.

== Finals ==
23 May 2008

Mamelodi Sundowns	0–0 (a.e.t.)	Kaizer Chiefs
Penalties
Moriri (penalty scored); Nyandoro (penalty missed); Chabangu (penalty scored); Mabizela (penalty scored); Mngomeni (penalty missed)	3–4	(penalty scored) Torrealba; (penalty scored) Schalkwyk; (penalty missed) Bhasera; (penalty scored) Tshabalala; (penalty scored) Letsholonyane

ABSA Stadium (Kings Park), Durban

MTN8 WAFA WAFA
2008 Winners
Kaizer Chiefs FC
14th Title

== Top scorers ==
Scorer	Club	Goals
(South Africa) Gert Schalkwyk	Kaizer Chiefs	3
(South Africa) Daine Klate	Supersport United	2
(South Africa) Brent Carelse	Supersport United	2
(South Africa) Surprise Moriri	Mamelodi Sundowns	2
(South Africa) Ryan Botha	Moroka Swallows	2
(Venezuela) Jose Torrealba	Kaizer Chiefs	2
(Liberia) Anthony Laffor	Supersport United	1
(Ethiopia) Fikru Tefera	Supersport United	1
(South Africa) Thembile Kanono	Orlando Pirates	1
(South Africa) Brett Evans	Ajax Cape Town	1
(Brazil) Eduardo Ferreira	Ajax Cape Town	1
(South Africa) Mabhuti Khanyeza	Ajax Cape Town	1
(South Africa) Lefa Tsutsulupa	Moroka Swallows	1
(South Africa) Sandile Ndlovu	Moroka Swallows	1
(South Africa) Morgan Shivambu	Moroka Swallows	1
(South Africa) Reneilwe Letsholonyane	Kaizer Chiefs	1
(South Africa) Katlego Mphela	Mamelodi Sundowns	1
(Chile) Jorge Acuña	Mamelodi Sundowns	1
(South Africa) Lerato Chabangu	Mamelodi Sundowns	1
