= 2011 Vodacom Challenge =

Tournament details
- Teams: 3

Tournament statistics
- Matches played: 4
- Goals scored: 7 (1.75 per match)

The 2011 Vodacom Challenge was a friendly soccer tournament played in South Africa between 16 July and 23 July 2011, contested by South African clubs Orlando Pirates and Kaizer Chiefs, and English side Tottenham Hotspur. Spurs won 3–0 in the final against Orlando Pirates to claim the title.

== Venues ==
Four cities served as the venues for the 2011 Vodacom Challenge.

Polokwane	Johannesburg	Port Elizabeth	Nelspruit
Old Peter Mokaba Stadium	Ellis Park Stadium	Nelson Mandela Bay Stadium	Mbombela Stadium
Capacity: 41,733	Capacity: 62,567	Capacity: 48,459	Capacity: 40,929

== Tottenham Hotspur squad ==
English Premier League team Tottenham Hotspur announced on 15 July 2011 that they would be bringing a full-strength squad to South Africa for the Vodacom Challenge.

Note: Flags indicate national team as defined under FIFA eligibility rules; some limited exceptions apply. Players may hold more than one non-FIFA nationality.

No.	Pos.	Nation	Player
1	GK	BRA	Heurelho Gomes
2	DF	SCO	Alan Hutton
3	MF	WAL	Gareth Bale
4	DF	FRA	Younès Kaboul
5	MF	ENG	David Bentley
6	MF	ENG	Tom Huddlestone
7	MF	ENG	Aaron Lennon
8	MF	ENG	Jermaine Jenas
9	FW	RUS	Roman Pavlyuchenko
10	FW	IRL	Robbie Keane
11	MF	NED	Rafael van der Vaart
12	MF	HON	Wilson Palacios
14	MF	CRO	Luka Modrić

No.	Pos.	Nation	Player
15	FW	ENG	Peter Crouch
16	DF	ENG	Kyle Naughton
18	FW	ENG	Jermain Defoe
19	DF	CMR	Sébastien Bassong
20	DF	ENG	Michael Dawson (captain)
21	MF	CRO	Niko Kranjčar
22	DF	CRO	Vedran Ćorluka
23	GK	ITA	Carlo Cudicini
25	MF	ENG	Danny Rose
24	GK	USA	Brad Friedel
28	DF	ENG	Kyle Walker
32	DF	CMR	Benoît Assou-Ekotto
36	DF	RSA	Bongani Khumalo
40	MF	RSA	Steven Pienaar

== Matches ==
=== First round ===
16 July 2011
15:30

Kaizer Chiefs (South Africa)	1–0	(England) Tottenham Hotspur
Lebese 93'	Report

Peter Mokaba Stadium, Polokwane
Attendance: 41,733

GK	31	Itumeleng Khune
RB	2	Jimmy Tau
CB	5	Dominic Isaacs	(substituted off) 46'
CB	3	Thomas Sweswe
LB	29	Zhaimu Jambo
RM	8	Tinashe Nengomasha
CM	6	Reneilwe Letsholonyane	(substituted off) 64'
CM	9	Josta Dladla	(substituted off) 64'
LM	14	Siphiwe Tshabalala	(substituted off) 64'
CF	7	Kaizer Motaung Junior	(substituted off) 64'
CF		Lehlohonolo Majoro	(substituted off) 64'
Substitutes:
DF		Tefu Mashamaite	(substituted on) 64'
MF	17	George Lebese	(substituted on) 64'
MF	10	Mthokozisi Yende	(substituted on) 64'
MF	11	Abia Nale	(substituted on) 64'
FW	21	Knowledge Musona	(substituted on) 64'
MF	12	Dominic Mateba	(substituted on) 64'
GK	30	Kabelo Metsimetsi
Manager:
(Serbia) Vladimir Vermezović

GK	23	Carlo Cudicini
RB	2	Alan Hutton	(substituted off) 46'
CB	19	Sébastien Bassong	(substituted off) 74'
CB	20	Michael Dawson	(substituted off) 46'
LB	32	Benoît Assou-Ekotto
RM	5	David Bentley	(substituted off) 46'
CM	6	Tom Huddlestone	(substituted off) 46'
CM	8	Jermaine Jenas
LM	21	Niko Kranjčar	(substituted off) 46'
CF	10	Robbie Keane	(substituted off) 46'
CF	18	Jermain Defoe	(substituted off) 46'
Substitutes:
GK		Brad Friedel
DF	22	Vedran Ćorluka	(substituted on) 49'
DF	36	Bongani Khumalo	(substituted on) 74'
DF	4	Younès Kaboul	(substituted on) 46'
MF	7	Aaron Lennon	(substituted on) 46'
MF	11	Rafael van der Vaart	(substituted on) 46'
MF	3	Gareth Bale	(substituted on) 46'
FW	9	Roman Pavlyuchenko	(substituted on) 46'
FW	15	Peter Crouch	(substituted on) 46'
DF	16	Kyle Naughton
Manager:
(England) Harry Redknapp

19 July 2011
20:15

Orlando Pirates (South Africa)	1–1	(England) Tottenham Hotspur
Jele 40'		Van der Vaart 17'

Mbombela Stadium, Nelspruit

GK	1	Senzo Meyiwa
RB	4	Happy Jele	(substituted off) 63'
CB	14	Lucky LekgwathiCaptain	(substituted off) 63'
CB	28	Rooi Mahamutsa	(substituted off) 46'
LB	38	Ruben Cloete
RM	15	Andile Jali	(substituted off) 63'
CM	20	Oupa Manyisa
CM	35	Isaac Chansa	(substituted off) 46'
LM	23	Tlou Segolela	(substituted off) 78'
CF	9	Bongani Ndulula	(substituted off) 75'
CF	7	Daine Klate	(substituted off) 46'
Substitutes:
GK	34	Jacob Mokhasi
DF		Njabulo Ntusi	(substituted on) 63'
DF	30	Robyn Johannes	(substituted on) 63'
DF		Siyabonga Sangweni	(substituted on) 46'
MF	6	Clifford Ngobeni	(substituted on) 63'
MF	12	Mark Mayambela	(substituted on) 46'
MF		Rudolf Bester	(substituted on) 78'
FW	26	Ndumiso Mabena	(substituted on) 75'
FW		Sameehg Doutie	(substituted on) 46'
Manager:
(Brazil) Júlio César Leal

GK		Brad Friedel
RB	16	Kyle Naughton	(substituted off) 46'
CB	4	Younès Kaboul	(substituted off) 46'
CB	36	Bongani Khumalo
LB	25	Danny Rose
RM	5	David Bentley	(substituted off) 46'
CM	14	Luka Modrić	(substituted off) 58'
CM	12	Wilson Palacios	(substituted off) 46'
LM	3	Gareth Bale	(substituted off) 58'
CF	11	Rafael van der Vaart	(substituted off) 46'
CF	18	Jermain Defoe	(substituted off) 46'
Substitutes:
GK	23	Carlo Cudicini
DF	28	Kyle Walker	(substituted on) 46'
DF	20	Michael Dawson	(substituted on) 46'
MF	7	Aaron Lennon	(substituted on) 46'
MF	21	Niko Kranjčar	(substituted on) 58'
DF	22	Vedran Ćorluka	(substituted on) 46'
MF	8	Jermaine Jenas	(substituted on) 58'
MF	10	Robbie Keane	(substituted on) 46'
FW	9	Roman Pavlyuchenko	(substituted on) 46'
Manager:
(England) Harry Redknapp

=== Soweto derby ===
21 July 2011
20:15

Kaizer Chiefs (South Africa)	0–1	(South Africa) Orlando Pirates
		Segolela 59'

Nelson Mandela Bay Stadium, Port Elizabeth
Attendance: 43,000

GK	31	Itumeleng Khune
RB	2	Jimmy Tau
CB	5	Dominic Isaacs
CB	3	Thomas Sweswe		(substituted off) 62'
LB	29	Zhaimu Jambo		(substituted off) 62'
RM	8	Tinashe Nengomasha
CM	6	Reneilwe Letsholonyane
CM	9	Josta Dladla
LM	14	Siphiwe Tshabalala		(substituted off) 46'
CF	21	Knowledge Musona		(substituted off) 76'
CF	20	Lehlohonolo Majoro		(substituted off) 46'
Substitutes:
DF	4	Tefu Mashamaite	(substituted on) 62'
DF	13	Keegan Richie	(substituted on) 62'
MF	10	Mthokozisi Yende	(substituted on) 46'
MF	11	Abia Nale	(substituted on) 46'
FW	7	Kaizer Motaung Junior	(substituted on) 64'
MF	22	Mandla Masango	(substituted on) 46'
GK	26	Lucky Khune	(substituted on) 76'
Manager:
(Serbia) Vladimir Vermezović

GK	1	Senzo Meyiwa
RB	4	Happy Jele
CB	21	Siyabonga Sangweni
CB	14	Lucky Lekgwathi
LB	38	Ruben Cloete
RM	23	Tlou Segolele		(substituted off) 83'
CM	20	Oupa Manyisa
CM	15	Andile Jali
LM	7	Daine Klate		(substituted off) 75'
CF	12	Mark Mayambela		(substituted off) 58'
CF	9	Bongani Ndulula		(substituted off) 65'
Substitutes:
MF	5	Dikgang Mabalane	(substituted on) 75'
MF	6	Clifford Ngobeni	(substituted on) 83'
FW	11	Sameehg Doutie	(substituted on) 65'
DF	18	Thulasizwe Mbuyane	(substituted on) 58'
Manager:
(Brazil) Júlio César Leal

=== Final ===
23 July 2011
15:00

Orlando Pirates (South Africa)	0–3	(England) Tottenham Hotspur
		Van der Vaart 35', 53'; Defoe 87'

Coca-Cola Park Stadium, Johannesburg

GK	1	Senzo Meyiwa
RB	4	Happy Jele
CB	14	Lucky Lekgwathi (c)		(substituted off) 63'
CB		Siyabonga Sangweni	(substituted off) 63'
LB	38	Ruben Cloete		(substituted off) 69'
RM		Thulasizwe Mbuyane		(substituted off) 46'
CM	20	Oupa Manyisa
CM	15	Andile Jali		(substituted off) 80'
LM	7	Daine Klate		(substituted off) 63'
CF	9	Bongani Ndulula		(substituted off) 87'
CF	23	Tlou Segolela		(substituted off) 62'
Substitutes:
DF	28	Rooi Mahamutsa		(substituted on) 63'
DF	30	Robyn Johannes		(substituted on) 63'
DF	32	Lucas Thwala		(substituted on) 69'
MF	11	Sameegh Doutie		(substituted on) 46'
MF	6	Clifford Ngobeni		(substituted on) 80'
MF	25	Rudolf Bester		(substituted on) 63'
FW	26	Ndumiso Mabena		(substituted on) 87'
FW	12	Mark Mayambela		(substituted on) 62'
Manager:
(Brazil) Júlio César Leal

GK	1	Heurelho Gomes
RB	28	Kyle Walker	(substituted off) 46'
CB	19	Sébastien Bassong
CB	36	Bongani Khumalo
LB	32	Benoît Assou-Ekotto
RM	7	Aaron Lennon	(substituted off) 60'
CM	14	Luka Modrić	(substituted off) 70'
CM	6	Tom Huddlestone	(substituted off) 46'
LM	30	Steven Pienaar	(substituted off) 46'
CF	11	Rafael van der Vaart
CF	18	Peter Crouch	(substituted off) 46'
Substitutes:
DF	2	Alan Hutton	(substituted on) 46'
MF	9	Roman Pavlyuchenko	(substituted on) 60'
MF	3	Gareth Bale	(substituted on) 70'
MF	12	Wilson Palacios	(substituted on) 46'
MF	21	Niko Kranjčar	(substituted on) 46'
FW	18	Jermain Defoe	(substituted on) 46'
Manager:
(England) Harry Redknapp
