= Onismor Bhasera =

Zimbabwean footballer (born 1986)

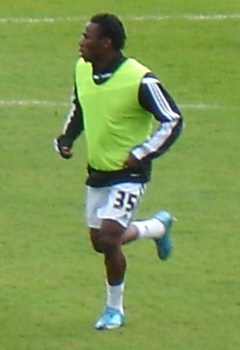
- Bhasera as a Plymouth Argyle player

Personal information
- Full name: Onismor Bhasera
- Date of birth: 7 January 1986 (age 40)
- Place of birth: Mutare, Zimbabwe
- Height: 5 ft 8 in (1.73 m)
- Position: Left-back

Team information
- Current team: SuperSport United
- Number: 14

Senior career*
Years	Team	Apps	(Gls)
2004	Harare United		
2004–2005	Tembisa Classic	14	(0)
2005–2007	Maritzburg United	53	(1)
2007–2009	Kaizer Chiefs	51	(1)
2010–2013	Plymouth Argyle	105	(3)
2013–2016	Bidvest Wits	56	(0)
2016–	SuperSport United	101	(20)

International career^{‡}
2006–	Zimbabwe	39	(0)
- * Club domestic league appearances and goals as of 27 January 2017 ‡ National team caps and goals as of 7 September 2021

Onismor Bhasera (born 7 January 1986) is a Zimbabwean professional footballer who plays as a left-back for SuperSport United in the South African Premier Soccer League. He previously played in the South African Premier Division for Bidvest Wits, Maritzburg United and Kaizer Chiefs, and the Football League for Plymouth Argyle. Bhasera has won caps at full international level for Zimbabwe.

== Club career ==
=== Early life and career ===
Bhasera was born on 7 January 1986 in Mutare, a city in the Manicaland Province of Zimbabwe. He was part of the Lord Marlvern High School team that won the Coca-Cola Nash three times in a row between 2001 and 2003; he was also the school captain during this time. He was playing in the AYSA youth academy which trained at Lord Marlvern High School, before he joined Harare United, a club which competed in the Zimbabwean First Division, one league below the Premier League. His performances for the team brought him to the attention of South African club Tembisa Classic and he joined them for the 2004–05 season, linking up with compatriot Edward Sadomba. Bhasera featured 14 times in the National First Division, as they won promotion to the Premier Soccer League.

The club, and the contracts of its players, were then purchased by the owners of Maritzburg United. His first season at the highest level of South African football proved to be very productive; he played in 27 league matches, and the club secured its place in the division for a second year. He featured regularly for the club again in the 2006–07 season, playing 26 league games. His first goal in professional competition came on 27 April 2007 in an away game against Moroka Swallows. Bhasera's club were trailing 3–0 when he scored after 32 minutes. The season was to end in disappointment as they returned to the First Division, managing just four league wins from 30 matches.

=== Kaizer Chiefs ===
His performances in a struggling side caught the eye of Kaizer Chiefs, one of the country's most prominent clubs, and he joined them ahead of the 2007–08 season. Bhasera scored his first goal for his new club on 29 September 2007 in the first round of the Telkom League Cup at home against Moroka Swallows. Bhasera scored the second goal in a 2–2 draw which the Amakhosi won by three goals to two after a penalty shootout. He scored his first league goal for the club just over a month later on 31 October 2007 against Free State Stars, scoring the Chiefs second goal after 77 minutes in a 3–0 home win. He went on to feature in 26 league games as the club finished sixth in the Premier Soccer League.

Bhasera collected his first winners medal with his new club on 1 December 2007 when the Kaizer Chiefs were crowned as the 2007 Telkom League Cup champions. The Amakhosi played out a 0–0 draw with Mamelodi Sundowns in the final at Loftus Versfeld Stadium which resulted in a penalty shootout being required to separate the two sides. Bhasera converted his penalty to give the Chiefs the lead, and team-mate Itumeleng Khune denied the Sundowns on three occasions as the Chiefs won the shootout by three goals to two.

Ahead of the 2008–09 season, the Kaizer Chiefs took part in the 2008 edition of the Vodacom Challenge, alongside Manchester United and Orlando Pirates. Bhasera featured in the starting eleven in all three of the Chiefs matches. During the first, a 1–1 draw with Manchester United, he was involved in an incident with Wayne Rooney. The England international appeared to aim a kick at Bhasera after a strong challenge from the left back, but it went undetected by the referee. Bhasera picked up a runners-up medal from the competition after the Chiefs were defeated 4–0 in the final.

The club won the MTN 8 title in September 2008, an annual competition made up of the top eight club's in the Premier Soccer League in the previous season. This time Bhasera missed his penalty in the shootout of the final at against Mamelodi Sundowns, after the match had finished 0–0, but the club went on to win by four goals to three at Kings Park Stadium. Bhasera featured in 25 league matches during the 2008–09 season, as the Amakhosi finished third in the table, five points behind Supersport United, who won the league title on goal difference. There was to be no repeat performance in the Telkom League Cup however, as the Chiefs were defeated 4–1 in the first round against Golden Arrows.

=== Contract dispute ===
Bhasera travelled to England in the summer of 2009 for pre-season training with Portsmouth, under the belief that he was a free agent. He impressed the club enough for them to offer him a contract in August 2009, and he successfully applied for a work permit, before the Kaizer Chiefs claimed that he was still contracted to them for another year. Portsmouth denied that the delay in signing the player was because they couldn't afford to pay a transfer fee, rather they were unwilling to pay the £300,000 sum demanded by the South African club. The Chiefs responded by saying that the only reason that the transfer had not gone through was because Pompey were struggling financially.

"Portsmouth have financial problems, and I have a letter from them and they say they owe Chelsea, they owe this one, and it's their problem not ours," said Bobby Motaung, the team manager of Kaizer Chiefs. "They can’t afford to pay us small change, we said it is a compensation not a transfer fee. We even said to them we will give them a six-month period of grace so that they can keep the player and pay us in January, without success", he added. Nothing had been resolved by January 2010, but Portsmouth were still hopeful of a deal being reached.

A few weeks later it looked likely that Bhasera would join Queens Park Rangers, having been invited to train with the club by Paul Hart, the man who originally tried to sign Bhasera for Portsmouth earlier in the season. The transfer saga then took another twist as it emerged that Sheffield Wednesday had entered the race for his signature. The Owls were apparently willing to pay a transfer fee to Kaizer Chiefs, but a knee problem meant that Bhasera failed a medical examination at the end of January 2010. He then began training with Plymouth Argyle in February 2010 after FIFA ruled that Bhasera was a free agent and therefore eligible to join a club outside the transfer window. The club successfully applied for a work permit in March 2010, but the transfer now hinged on the player obtaining a visa to work in the United Kingdom, including an English exam, and receiving international clearance.

=== Plymouth Argyle ===
The transfer was concluded a week later when Bhasera passed an English exam, and received international clearance from the SAFA. The Pilgrims manager, Paul Mariner, was full of praise for his new signing. "Having watched him work over the past few weeks, seen him interact with the players, and seen his technical ability, it became a very important step for the club to sign this young player," said the former England international. He made his debut for the club on 30 March 2010 when he played the full 90 minutes against Barnsley, having arrived back in the country from South Africa just twelve hours earlier. "It has been a busy time, but that's the name of the game," said Bhasera. "I was a bit tired after the game, but that's my job". Having last played in a competitive match on 9 May 2009, Bhasera was delighted to finally settle down again. "It was really frustrating," he admitted. "I didn't know what was going to happen to me, but I had to keep strong and keep hoping that everything was going to be all right. Now I have managed to sort things out and I am back playing again at last. I am happy that I am here". In his next match, the second in four days, Bhasera set-up striker Bradley Wright-Phillips to score the winning goal in the club's 2–1 victory at Doncaster Rovers. Argyle were unable to avoid relegation to League One, which prompted a statement from the club which outlined their plans to rebuild; and Bhasera was mentioned among of clutch of younger players who are "exciting prospects".

The arrival of Peter Reid as the club's new manager saw Bhasera moved into a more advanced position and he began the 2010–11 season on the left side of midfield. He signed a new contract in August 2010, which ties him to the club until the summer of 2013. He scored his first goal in English football in a 3–1 win over Milton Keynes Dons going on a 40-yard run before beating the goalkeeper. Bhasera's performances during the 2012–13 season led to him being voted as the club's Player of the Year by supporters. He was offered a contract extension by Argyle manager John Sheridan at the end of the campaign, but he failed to return for pre-season training in June and no contact had been made with him before it expired at the end of the month.

== International career ==
Bhasera made his debut for Zimbabwe on 24 June 2006 against Malawi as part of a friendly tournament in Mozambique. He earned five caps at Under-17 level, nineteen for the Under-20 side, and one at Under-23 level before gaining his first cap at senior level. He was involved in all six of Zimbabwe's qualifying matches for the 2010 FIFA World Cup and 2010 Africa Cup of Nations in 2008. The Warriors were undefeated in their three home games, including a 2–0 win against Namibia, but results in their away matches meant that they didn't qualify for the third round stage.

== Career statistics ==
=== Club ===
As of match played on 27 April 2013

Appearances and goals by club, season and competition
Club	Season	League		FA Cup		League Cup		Other (Note: Includes other competitive competitions, such as Super Eight and Telkom Charity Cup.)		Total	
Club	Season	Apps	Goals	Apps	Goals	Apps	Goals	Apps	Goals	Apps	Goals
Tembisa Classic	2004–05	14	0	—	—	—	—	—	—	14	0
Maritzburg United	2005–06	27	0	—	—	—	—	—	—	27	0
Maritzburg United	2006–07	26	1	—	—	—	—	—	—	26	1
Maritzburg United	Total	53	1	—	—	—	—	—	—	53	1
Kaizer Chiefs	2007–08	26	1	—	—	—	—	—	—	26	1
Kaizer Chiefs	2008–09	25	0	—	—	—	—	—	—	25	0
Kaizer Chiefs	Total	51	1	—	—	—	—	—	—	51	1
Plymouth Argyle	2009–10	7	0	0	0	0	0	0	0	7	0
Plymouth Argyle	2010–11	29	1	1	0	1	0	1	0	32	1
Plymouth Argyle	2011–12	27	1	2	1	0	0	0	0	29	2
Plymouth Argyle	2012–13	42	1	1	0	2	0	1	0	46	1
Plymouth Argyle	Total	105	3	4	1	3	0	2	0	114	4
Career total		223	5	4	1	3	0	2	0	232	6

=== International ===
As of match played on 9 September 2012

Appearances and goals by national team and year
National team	Year	Apps	Goals
Zimbabwe	2006	4	0
Zimbabwe	2007	2	0
Zimbabwe	2008	7	0
Zimbabwe	2009	0	0
Zimbabwe	2010	2	0
Zimbabwe	2011	0	0
Zimbabwe	2012	4	0
Total		19	0

== Honours ==
Tembisa Classic

- Premier Soccer League play-offs: 2005

Kaizer Chiefs

- Telkom Knockout Cup: 2007
- Super Eight Cup: 2008
