= Sifiso =

Sifiso is a South African given name. When translated to English It means Wish. Notable people with the name include:

- Sifiso Hlanti, South African soccer player
- Sifiso Mahima, South African cricketer
- Sifiso Mlungwana, South African footballer
- Sifiso Myeni (born 1988), South African football player
- Sifiso Mzobe, South African author
- Sifiso Ngobeni, South African soccer player
- Sifiso Nhlapo (born 1987), South African racing cyclist
- Sifiso Nkabinde, (1960–1999), South African politician
- Sifiso Sonjica, South African politician
- Sifiso Vilakazi, South African footballer
