= Nduduzo =

Nduduzo is a given name. Notable people with the name include:

- Nduduzo Lembethe (born 1996), South African field hockey player
- Nduduzo Makhathini (born 1982), South African jazz musician
- Nduduzo Mfoza (born 1997), South African cricketer
- Nduduzo Sibiya (born 1995), South African footballer
