= Musa Bilankulu =

South African professional footballer

Personal information
- Date of birth: 22 February 1985 (age 41)
- Place of birth: Vosloorus, South Africa
- Height: 1.84 m (6 ft 0 in)
- Position: Defender

Senior career*
Years	Team	Apps	(Gls)
2005–2013	Golden Arrows		
2013–2014	Bidvest Wits	5	(0)
2014–2016	Bloemfontein Celtic	53	(0)
2016–2020	Golden Arrows	80	(4)
2020–2021	Bizana Pondo Chiefs	21	(5)
- * Club domestic league appearances and goals as of 12 November 2022

Musa Bilankulu (born 22 February 1985) is a South African former professional soccer player who played as a defender.

== Club career ==
Born in Vosloorus, Bilankulu began his career with Golden Arrows in 2005. He later played for Bidvest Wits, Bloemfontein Celtic, Golden Arrows for a second spell, and Bizana Pondo Chiefs.

He signed for Bizana Pondo Chiefs in December 2020, in a deal until the end of the season.

== International career ==
He received his first call-up to the South African national team in November 2011.

== Coaching career ==
Bilankulu was appointed as an assistant coach at Golden Arrows in August 2022, and held this role until 2026. He briefly worked in the same role at Marumo Gallants before being sacked in September 2026.

== Personal life ==
Bilankulu married his long-term girlfriend in March 2020.
