= Njabulo =

Njabulo is a South African masculine given name. Notable people with the surname include:

- Njabulo Blom (born 1999), South African soccer player
- Njabulo Mabuza, Swazi businessman and politician
- Njabulo Manqana (born 1986), South African soccer player
- Njabulo Ncube (born 1989), Zimbabwean cricketer
- Njabulo Ndebele, South African academic and writer
- Njabulo Ndlovu (born 1994), Swazi footballer
- Njabulo Ngcobo (born 1994), South African soccer player
- Njabulo Nzuza (born 1982), South African politician
