= 2018–19 SAFA Second Division =

SAFA Second Division
- Season: 2018–19
- Champions: JDR Stars
- Promoted: JDR Stars; Steenberg United

The 2018–19 SAFA Second Division (known as the ABC Motsepe League for sponsorship reasons) was the 21st season of the SAFA Second Division, the third tier for South African association football clubs, since its establishment in 1998. Due to the size of South Africa, the competition was split into nine divisions, one for each region. After the league stage of the regional competition was completed, the nine winning teams of each regional division entered the playoffs.

JDR Stars won the playoff after defeating Steenberg United 1-0 in the final. Both teams were promoted to the National First Division, with JDR Stars earning R1 million, and Steenberg United R500,000, in prize money.

== Regions ==
=== Eastern Cape ===
Pos	Team	Pld	W	D	L	GF	GA	GD	Pts	Qualification or relegation
1	Tornado F.C.	28	19	6	3	49	13	+36	63	Playoffs
2	Mthatha Bucks	28	19	5	4	47	16	+31	62	
3	Bizana Pondo Chiefs	28	19	3	6	53	22	+31	60	
4	PE Stars	28	18	5	5	62	26	+36	59	
5	Sibanye FC	29	17	7	5	21	26	−5	58	
6	Peace Makers FC	28	13	7	8	41	29	+12	46	
7	Yaka United	28	10	5	13	38	44	−6	35	
8	Amavarara	28	10	4	14	40	41	−1	34	
9	Highbury F.C.	28	9	5	14	40	42	−2	32	
10	Swartkops Valley United Brothers	28	8	7	13	25	45	−20	31	
11	Matta Milan	28	7	9	12	31	45	−14	30	
12	Birmingham City	28	6	6	16	39	69	−30	24	
13	Butterworth F.C.	28	6	5	17	18	43	−25	23	
14	Bush Bucks	28	6	3	19	28	71	−43	21	
15	The Guys	28	3	5	20	13	44	−31	14	
16	Future Tigers	0	0	0	0	0	0	0	0	

Source: https://diskizone.com/table/abc-motsepe-eastern-cape-log-2018-2019/

=== Free State ===
Pos	Team	Pld	W	D	L	GF	GA	GD	Pts	Qualification or relegation
1	Mangaung Unite	30	25	5	0	84	20	+64	80	Playoffs
2	Bloemfontein Young Tigers	30	18	7	5	53	23	+30	61	
3	Harmony FC	30	18	6	6	37	26	+11	60	
4	Sibanye Golden Stars	30	16	5	9	43	34	+9	53	
5	Small Tigers	30	15	7	8	62	40	+22	52	
6	Super Eagles	30	13	9	8	44	38	+6	48	
7	Central University	30	10	10	10	36	34	+2	40	
8	Bloemfontein Celtic Development	30	11	6	13	49	43	+6	39	
9	Days FC	30	10	6	14	41	44	−3	36	
10	Mphatlalatsane United	30	10	4	16	42	45	−3	34	
11	Lijabatho FC	30	10	3	17	38	71	−33	33	
12	Dikwena United	30	9	5	16	36	47	−11	32	
13	Free State Stars Academy	30	7	10	13	41	46	−5	31	
14	Kovsies	30	7	10	13	31	46	−15	31	
15	Knowledge Glen	30	8	4	18	38	54	−16	28	
16	Dia 2 FC	30	4	1	25	19	83	−64	13	

Source: https://diskizone.com/table/abc-motsepe-free-state-log-2018-2019/

=== Gauteng ===
Pos	Team	Pld	W	D	L	GF	GA	GD	Pts	Qualification or relegation
1	JDR Stars	30	18	10	2	52	16	+36	64	Playoffs
2	Baberwa	30	17	10	3	50	23	+27	61	
3	Dondol Stars	30	20	6	4	53	19	+34	66	
4	Dube Continental	30	17	3	10	50	37	+13	54	
5	Alexandra United	30	13	7	10	39	35	+4	46	
6	M Tigers	30	13	6	11	41	33	+8	45	
7	Swallows	30	9	14	7	34	29	+5	41	
8	Pretoria Callies	30	10	11	9	33	31	+2	41	
9	Vaal Professionals	30	10	8	12	32	46	−14	38	
10	Pele Pele	30	10	6	14	42	37	+5	36	
11	African All Stars	40	8	12	20	30	30	0	36	
12	Tembisa Sports Centre	30	10	5	15	33	46	−13	35	
13	Leruma United	29	8	7	14	36	45	−9	31	
14	FC MaLions	29	8	4	17	26	53	−27	28	
15	Alexandra Black Aces	30	8	1	21	29	60	−31	25	
16	XI Experience	30	2	6	22	26	66	−40	12	

Source: https://diskizone.com/table/abc-motsepe-gauteng-log-2018-2019/

=== Kwazulu-Natal ===
Pos	Team	Pld	W	D	L	GF	GA	GD	Pts	Qualification or relegation
1	Summerfield Dynamos	28	22	4	2	58	19	+39	70	Playoffs
2	Happy Wanderers	28	18	5	5	57	27	+30	59	
3	GWP Friends	27	16	3	8	43	25	+18	51	
4	Umvoti	27	15	5	7	47	26	+21	50	
5	KwaDabeka Sporting	28	15	5	8	43	28	+15	50	
6	Durban FC	28	9	8	11	35	37	−2	35	
7	KwaDukuza United	28	8	9	11	32	44	−12	33	
8	Natal United	28	9	5	14	29	43	−14	32	
9	Rainham Sporting FC	28	7	9	12	21	35	−14	30	
10	Edendale Juventus	28	8	6	14	24	39	−15	30	
11	Ladysmith United	28	8	6	14	29	53	−24	30	
12	XI Experience	28	7	7	14	32	44	−12	28	
13	Milford FC	31	9	9	13	22	26	−4	36	
14	Maritzburg City	28	7	6	15	26	37	−11	27	
15	Ashley United	28	6	9	13	27	42	−15	27	

Source: https://diskizone.com/table/abc-motsepe-kzn-log-2018-2019/

=== Limpopo ===
Pos	Team	Pld	W	D	L	GF	GA	GD	Pts	Qualification or relegation
1	Mikhado FC	30	16	10	4	59	30	+29	58	Playoffs
2	Polokwane United	30	18	4	8	47	28	+19	58	
3	The Dolphins	30	17	6	7	42	28	+14	57	
4	Boyne Tigers F.C.	30	13	8	9	45	35	+10	47	
5	Berachah Valley F.C.	30	13	8	9	45	35	+10	47	
6	Ditlou F.C.	30	11	7	12	37	45	−8	40	
7	Magesi F.C.	30	10	8	12	37	43	−6	38	
8	Pusela F.C.	30	8	10	12	43	53	−10	34	
9	Polokwane City Academy	30	9	7	14	38	50	−12	34	
10	Mighty F.C.	30	9	7	14	29	43	−14	34	
11	Ollesdas FC	30	9	6	15	50	54	−4	33	
12	Ndengeza FC	30	9	5	16	54	65	−11	32	
13	Great North F.C.	30	9	5	16	44	56	−12	32	
14	TRON F.C.	30	8	7	15	37	50	−13	31	
15	Giyani Hotspurs	30	7	5	18	36	66	−30	26	
16	Madridtas	30	19	7	4	67	29	+38	2 (Note: Madridtas were deducted all points from the 28 matches played with Martin Nsimba in the team after it was discovered that Nsimba had a fraudulent clearance certificate.)	

Source: https://diskizone.com/table/abc-motsepe-limpopo-log-2018-2019/

=== Mpumalanga ===
Pos	Team	Pld	W	D	L	GF	GA	GD	Pts	Qualification or relegation
1	Acornbush United	30	23	5	2	73	23	+50	74	Playoffs
2	Tjakastad Junior Shepard	30	20	4	6	49	16	+33	64	
3	Witbank Citylads	30	17	6	7	53	24	+29	57	
4	Mlambo Royal Cubs	30	16	3	11	37	25	+12	51	
5	Barberton City Stars	30	15	4	11	45	39	+6	49	
6	FC Zone Mavo	30	13	8	9	42	38	+4	47	
7	Nkomazi Royal Eagles	30	12	9	9	43	30	+13	45	
8	Lumoja FC	30	11	7	12	48	50	−2	40	
9	Bushbuckridge Bohlabela United	30	10	9	11	37	35	+2	39	
10	Secunda M Stars	30	9	9	12	37	37	0	36	
11	Bakone FC	30	8	9	13	25	38	−13	33	
12	Nkomazi Real Aces	30	10	3	17	37	52	−15	33	
13	Gemsbok Classic	30	8	9	13	47	64	−17	33	
14	F.C Benfica	30	10	0	20	31	64	−33	30	
15	Somhlolo United	30	8	4	18	32	60	−28	28	
16	Mhluzi Black Rangers	30	4	3	23	22	63	−41	15	

Source: https://diskizone.com/table/abc-motsepe-mpumalanga-log-2018-2019/

=== North West ===
Pos	Team	Pld	W	D	L	GF	GA	GD	Pts	Qualification or relegation
1	Casric	30	24	5	1	74	23	+51	77	Playoffs
2	Buya Msuthu F.C.	30	23	5	2	68	15	+53	74	
3	Young Zebras F.C.	30	22	5	3	61	19	+42	71	
4	Polokwane City Rovers	30	17	5	8	58	29	+29	56	
5	Orbit College	29	14	7	8	48	35	+13	49	
6	Ally's Tigers	30	13	8	9	45	31	+14	47	
7	Northwest University	30	13	6	11	35	34	+1	45	
8	Stilfontein Real Hearts	30	12	3	15	43	46	−3	39	
9	Makapanstad Romans F.C.	30	8	9	13	35	44	−9	33	
10	Marauding Class	30	8	7	15	37	48	−11	31	
11	Thaba Tshwane FC	29	7	8	14	21	40	−19	29	
12	Master Peace	30	7	7	16	35	61	−26	28	
13	Glamour Boys	30	7	5	18	39	63	−24	26	
14	Lerome Real South	30	6	5	19	26	69	−43	23	
15	Phatsima All Stars	30	5	7	18	22	63	−41	22	
16	Moretele Gunners	30	4	6	20	27	54	−27	18	
17	Tigane Chelsea	0	0	0	0	0	0	0	0	

Source: https://diskizone.com/table/abc-motsepe-north-west-log-2018-2019/

=== Northern Cape ===
==== Stream A ====
Pos	Team	Pld	W	D	L	GF	GA	GD	Pts	Qualification or relegation
1	Hungry Lions	14	9	3	2	34	18	+16	30	Playoffs
2	Tornado FC	14	8	0	6	25	23	+2	24	
3	Mainstay United	14	6	3	5	28	28	0	21	
4	Kakamas Sundowns	14	5	3	6	22	26	−4	18	
5	Tsantshabane Stars FC	14	5	2	7	20	19	+1	17	
6	Kakamas Juventus	14	4	5	5	22	27	−5	17	
7	Rasta Far Eagles	14	4	4	6	24	32	−8	16	
8	Olympics	14	4	2	8	25	27	−2	14	

Source: https://diskizone.com/table/nc-stream-a-log-2018-2019/

==== Stream B ====
Pos	Team	Pld	W	D	L	GF	GA	GD	Pts	Qualification or relegation
1	United Rovers	12	9	3	0	23	9	+14	30	Playoffs
2	Conville United	12	9	1	2	28	15	+13	28	
3	Northern Cape Liverpool	12	8	1	3	24	14	+10	25	
4	Olifantshoek Young Stars	12	5	0	7	17	22	−5	15	
5	Magareng Young Stars	12	4	0	8	13	20	−7	12	
6	Kuruman Kicks F.C.	12	2	1	9	28	15	+13	7	
7	Maruping United	12	1	2	9	13	26	−13	5	
8	William Prescod A. F.C.	0	0	0	0	0	0	0	0	

Source: https://diskizone.com/table/nc-stream-b-log-2018-2019/

=== Western Cape ===
Pos	Team	Pld	W	D	L	GF	GA	GD	Pts	Qualification or relegation
1	Steenberg United	30	21	6	3	62	18	+44	69	Playoffs
2	The Magic	30	20	7	3	59	19	+40	67	
3	Zizwe United	30	16	11	3	62	26	+36	59	
4	Glendene United	30	16	8	6	46	31	+15	56	
5	Ikapa Sporting	30	12	10	8	38	33	+5	46	
6	Ajax Cape Town Youth	30	13	4	13	53	50	+3	43	
7	Morning Stars	30	12	7	11	41	45	−4	43	
8	Santos	30	11	8	11	40	37	+3	41	
9	Hout Bay United	30	12	4	14	39	40	−1	40	
10	Grassy Park United	30	10	9	11	46	48	−2	39	
11	Batalion FC	30	11	5	14	31	34	−3	38	
12	Jomos Power	30	11	2	17	43	82	−39	35	
13	Royal Blues	30	9	7	14	34	43	−9	34	
14	FN Rangers	30	7	6	17	39	45	−6	27	
15	Ocean View FC	30	2	9	19	25	64	−39	15	
16	Mbekweni Cosmos	30	3	5	22	27	70	−43	14	

Source: https://diskizone.com/table/abc-motsepe-western-cape-log-2018-2019/

== Playoff stage ==
=== Group A ===
Pos	Team	Pld	W	D	L	GF	GA	GD	Pts
1	Casric	2	2	0	0	6	0	+6	6
2	Acornbush United	2	1	0	1	3	1	+2	3
3	Mikhado	2	0	0	2	0	8	−8	0

Source: https://diskizone.com/table/abc-motsepe-promotion-playoff-group-a-log-2018-2019/

=== Group B ===
Pos	Team	Pld	W	D	L	GF	GA	GD	Pts
1	Hungry Lions	2	1	1	0	3	2	+1	4
2	Mangaung Unite	2	0	2	0	3	3	0	2
3	Tornado	2	0	1	1	3	4	−1	1

Source: https://diskizone.com/table/abc-motsepe-promotion-playoff-group-b-log-2018-2019/

=== Group C ===
Pos	Team	Pld	W	D	L	GF	GA	GD	Pts
1	Steenberg United	2	2	0	0	5	3	+2	6
2	JDR Stars	2	1	0	1	7	5	+2	3
3	Summerfield Dynamos	2	0	0	2	1	5	−4	0

Source: https://diskizone.com/table/abc-motsepe-promotion-playoff-group-c-log-2018-2019/

=== Semi-finals ===
7 June 2019

JDR Stars	2 - 0	Hungry Lions
	Report

Erica Park
7 June 2019

Casric	0 - 1	Steenberg
	Report

Erica Park

=== Playoff final ===
8 June 2019

JDR Stars	1 - 0	Steenberg United
Sello Letooane	Report

Erica Park
