= Sbonelo Cele =

South African soccer player

Personal information
- Date of birth: 27 August 2001 (age 25)
- Place of birth: Durban, South Africa
- Height: 1.71 m (5 ft 7 in)
- Position: Defender

Team information
- Current team: Golden Arrows
- Number: 30

Senior career*
Years	Team	Apps	(Gls)
2020–2021	Uthongathi	25	(1)
2021–	Golden Arrows	88	(3)

International career^{‡}
2022–	South Africa	1	(0)
- * Club domestic league appearances and goals as of 4 January 2026 ‡ National team caps and goals as of 12 June 2023

Sbonelo Cele (born 27 August 2001) is a South African soccer player who plays as a left back for Lamontville Golden Arrows in the Premier Soccer League.

In March 2022 he was named in a preliminary national team squad to play France, but was not a part of the final 23-man squad. Cele was instead called up to Bafana Bafana for the 2022 COSAFA Cup. Here, he featured during the plate final which South Africa won against Botswana.
