= Samuel Ramosoeu =

Motswana footballer (born 1982)

Personal information
- Full name: Samuel Thabo Ramosoeu
- Birth name: Samuel Maposa
- Date of birth: 15 August 1982 (age 44)
- Place of birth: Mafikeng, South Africa
- Height: 1.70 m (5 ft 7 in)
- Position: Forward

Team information
- Current team: Hang Sai
- Number: 92

Senior career*
Years	Team	Apps	(Gls)
2001	Extension Gunners		
2002–2004	Mochudi Centre Chiefs		
2003	→ Blue Waters (loan)		
2005	Orlando Pirates (Namibia)		
2006	Hounslow Borough		
2007	Cambridge FC		
2008	WaiBOP United		
2008	Hamilton Wanderers		
2008–2009	Bid Boys		
2009–2011	Bidvest Wits	11	(3)
2010	→ Winners Park (loan)		
2011	FC Porto de Macau	11	(8)
2013–2014	Orlando Pirates (Namibia)		
2014–2015	Windsor Arch Ka I	27	(12)
2016–	Hang Sai	14	(4)

International career
- Botswana U15
- Botswana U17
- Botswana U20
- Botswana U23
- * Club domestic league appearances and goals as of 19:33, 5 April 2019 (UTC)

Samuel Thabo Ramosoeu (né Maposa; born 15 August 1982) is a footballer who plays as a midfielder for Liga de Elite side Hang Sai. Born in South Africa, he represented Botswana internationally.

== Career statistics ==
=== Club ===
As of 5 April 2019.

Club	Season	League			Cup		Other		Total	
Club	Season	Division	Apps	Goals	Apps	Goals	Apps	Goals	Apps	Goals
Bidvest Wits	2008–09	ABSA Premiership	10	3	1 (Note: Appearances in the MTN 8)	0	0	0	11	3
Bidvest Wits	2009–10	ABSA Premiership	1	0	0	0	0	0	1	0
Bidvest Wits	Total		11	3	1	0	0	0	12	3
FC Porto de Macau	2011	Campeonato da 1ª Divisão do Futebol	11	8	0	0	0	0	11	8
Windsor Arch Ka I	2014	Campeonato da 1ª Divisão do Futebol	13	3	0	0	0	0	13	3
Windsor Arch Ka I	2015	Campeonato da 1ª Divisão do Futebol	14	9	0	0	0	0	14	9
Windsor Arch Ka I	Total		27	12	0	0	0	0	27	12
Hang Sai	2018	Liga de Elite	10	4	0	0	0	0	10	4
Hang Sai	2019	Liga de Elite	4	0	0	0	0	0	4	0
Hang Sai	Total		14	4	0	0	0	0	14	4
Career total			63	27	1	0	0	0	64	27
