= Nhlanhla Vilakazi =

South African soccer player

Personal information
- Full name: Nhlanhla Vilakazi
- Date of birth: 25 February 1987 (age 39)
- Place of birth: Wattville, South Africa
- Positions: Left wing back; left winger

Youth career
- Wattville Argentina
- Wattville Watford Brothers
- Abakalt FC
- Moroka Swallows
- Mamelodi Sundowns

Senior career*
Years	Team	Apps	(Gls)
2008–2009	Golden Arrows	0	(0)
2009–2010	Bay United	6	(0)
2010–2013	Ajax Cape Town	38	(1)
2013–2015	Maritzburg United	28	(1)
2015–2018	Free State Stars	67	(0)
2018–2020	AmaZulu	39	(0)
- * Club domestic league appearances and goals as of 1 May 2020

Nhlanhla Vilakazi (born 25 February 1987) is a South African professional soccer player, who last played as either a left midfielder or left back for Premier Soccer League club AmaZulu.

== Club career ==
=== Golden Arrows ===
Nhlanhla Vilakazi signed with Golden Arrows on 1 July 2008, however he transferred to Bay United for an undisclosed amount in the following transfer window.

=== Bay United ===
Transferring to Bay United from Golden Arrows on 28 January 2009 for an undisclosed amount midway through the season, finishing the season, and playing in the 2009–10 season, he made a total of 6 appearances for the club. However the team did not fare well, and the end of the season would see Bay United relegated to the National First Division.

=== Ajax Cape Town ===
Vilakazi transferred once more on 1 July 2010, this time to Ajax Cape Town, where he is currently playing. On 14 January 2013 Ajax Cape Town announced that Vilakazi had signed a pre-contract with Maritzbur United as he entered the last six months of his spell at the Cape outfit.

=== Maritzburg United ===
On 14 January 2013 Ajax Cape Town announced that Vilakazi had signed a pre-contract with Maritzburg United as he entered the last six months of his spell at the Cape outfit and the club decided against their option of extending his stay.

=== Free State Stars ===
In November 2015, Vilakazi joined Free State Stars.

=== AmaZulu ===
In March 2018 it was revealed that Vilakazi signed a pre-contract with AmaZulu F.C., and would be joining them in the 2018/2019 season.

== Honours ==
=== Club ===
Ajax Cape Town

- 2010 Telkom Knockout: Finalist

AmaZulu

- 2018 Nedbank Cup: Winner
