= Igor Alves =

Brazilian footballer (born 1988)

Personal information
- Full name: Igor Medeiros de Melo Alves
- Date of birth: 24 April 1988 (age 38)
- Place of birth: Rio de Janeiro, Brazil
- Height: 1.71 m (5 ft 7 in)
- Position: Midfielder

Youth career
- 2003: Flamengo
- 2004: CFZ
- 2005–2007: Vasco da Gama

Senior career*
Years	Team	Apps	(Gls)
2008	Vasco da Gama	0	(0)
2008–2011	Moroka Swallows	23	(2)
2011–2012	Widzew Łódź	2	(0)
2014	Itabaiana	6	(3)
2015	Bangu	8	(0)
2016–2018	Itabaiana	42	(3)
2019	Paragominas	2	(0)
2019	Itabaiana	14	(3)
2020–2021	Sergipe	6	(1)
2021	Fluminense de Feira		
- * Club domestic league appearances and goals

Igor Medeiros de Melo Alves (born 4 April 1988), or simply Igor Alves, is a Brazilian former professional footballer who played as a midfielder.

== Career ==
In August 2011, he joined Associação Olímpica de Itabaiana on a one-and-a-half-year contract.

== Honours ==
Moroka Swallows

- Nedbank Cup: 2009
