= Maximilian Mbaeva =

Namibian footballer

Personal information
- Date of birth: 14 April 1989 (age 37)
- Place of birth: Windhoek, South West Africa
- Height: 1.80 m (5 ft 11 in)
- Position: Goalkeeper

Senior career*
| Years | Team | Apps | (Gls) |
| 2007–2014 | African Stars | | |
| 2014–2022 | Lamontville Golden Arrows | 86 | (0) |

International career^{‡}
| 2008–2019 | Namibia | 21 | (0) |
- * Club domestic league appearances and goals as of 12 November 2022 ‡ National team caps and goals as of 12 November 2022

Maximilian Mbaeva (born 14 April 1989) is a Namibian international footballer who plays for South African club Lamontville Golden Arrows, as a goalkeeper.

== Career ==
He was born in Windhoek.

Mbaeva has played club football for African Stars and Lamontville Golden Arrows.

He made his international debut for Namibia in 2008.
