= Thokozani Mshengu =

South African soccer player (born 1985)

Personal information
- Full name: Thokozani Bonga Mshengu
- Date of birth: 29 November 1985 (age 40)
- Place of birth: Howick, South Africa
- Position: Midfielder

Youth career
- Maritzburg City

Senior career*
Years	Team	Apps	(Gls)
2007–2010	Lamontville Golden Arrows	45	(1)
2010–2012	Bloemfontein Celtic	41	(4)
2012–2014	AmaZulu	22	(2)
2015	Thanda Royal Zulu	1	(0)
2016	Mbombela United	3	(1)
- * Club domestic league appearances and goals

Thokozani Mshengu (born 29 December 1985) is a South African former soccer player who played as a midfielder for Lamontville Golden Arrows, Bloemfontein Celtic and AmaZulu in the South African Premier Soccer League.
