= Bafo Biyela =

South African soccer player

Personal information
- Full name: Bafo Biyela
- Date of birth: 11 January 1981
- Place of birth: Empangeni, South Africa
- Date of death: 17 September 2012 (aged 31)
- Height: 1.76 m (5 ft 9 in)
- Position: Defensive midfielder

Youth career
- Chess FC

Senior career*
Years	Team	Apps	(Gls)
2005–2009	AmaZulu	76	(2)
2009–2010	Golden Arrows	9	(0)
2010–2011	Mpumalanga Black Aces	15	(0)
2012	Thanda Royal Zulu		

International career
2008	South Africa	1	(0)
- * Club domestic league appearances and goals

Bafo Biyela (11 January 1981 – 17 September 2012) was a South African soccer player who played as a midfielder.
