= Velemseni Ndwandwe =

South African soccer player

Personal information
- Date of birth: 18 January 1996 (age 30)
- Place of birth: Empangeni, South Africa
- Height: 1.67 m (5 ft 6 in)
- Position: Midfielder

Team information
- Current team: Lamontville Golden Arrows
- Number: 12

Youth career
- –2017: Lamontville Golden Arrows

Senior career*
Years	Team	Apps	(Gls)
2017–	Lamontville Golden Arrows	144	(15)
- * Club domestic league appearances and goals as of 4 January 2026

Velemseni Ndwandwe (born 18 January 1996) is a South African soccer player who plays as a midfielder for South African Premier Division side Lamontville Golden Arrows.

He was named in the preliminary South Africa squad for the 2023 COSAFA Cup.
