= John Mwengani =

Zambian footballer (born 1994)

Personal information
- Date of birth: 30 December 1994 (age 31)
- Place of birth: Lusaka, Zambia
- Position: Defender

Team information
- Current team: Golden Arrows

Senior career*
Years	Team	Apps	(Gls)
2013	Kansanshi Dynamos F.C.		
2014–2015	Konkola Blades F.C.		
2016	Forest Rangers F.C.		
2017–2018	Nkana F.C.		
2019	Nakambala Leopards F.C.		
2019–2024	Kansanshi Dynamos F.C.		
2024–	Golden Arrows	10	(0)

International career
2018	Zambia	1	(0)
- * Club domestic league appearances and goals as of 4 January 2026

John Mwengani (born 30 December 1994) is a Zambian football defender who currently plays for South african club Golden Arrows.
