= Mokete Tsotetsi =

South African soccer player

Personal information
- Full name: Mokete Reuben Tsotetsi
- Date of birth: 14 November 1982 (age 43)
- Place of birth: Boipatong, South Africa
- Height: 1.80 m (5 ft 11 in)
- Position: Central defender

Senior career*
Years	Team	Apps	(Gls)
2002–2003	Wits University	0	(0)
2003–2004	FC Sporting	21	(1)
2004–2007	Jomo Cosmos	73	(0)
2007–2009	Kaizer Chiefs	36	(2)
2009–2010	Bloemfontein Celtic	18	(0)
2010–2011	Vasco da Gama	27	(1)
2011–2012	Mpumalanga Black Aces	0	(0)
2013–2014	Roses United	6	(0)

International career
2008	South Africa	1	(0)
- * Club domestic league appearances and goals as of 18:09, 28 March 2015 (UTC)

Mokete Reuben Tsotetsi (born 14 November 1982) is a South African international soccer player who plays as a central defender.

== Career ==
Born in Boipatong, Tsotetsi has played for Wits University, FC Sporting, Jomo Cosmos, Kaizer Chiefs, Bloemfontein Celtic, Vasco da Gama, Mpumalanga Black Aces and Roses United.

He earned one cap for South Africa, which came in a FIFA World Cup qualifying match against Sierra Leone on 14 June 2008.
