= Lefa Tsutsulupa =

South African soccer player

Personal information
- Full name: Samuel Lefa Tsutsulupa
- Date of birth: 7 February 1980 (age 46)
- Place of birth: Ladybrand, South Africa
- Height: 1.75 m (5 ft 9 in)
- Positions: Defensive midfielder; central midfielder

Senior career*
| Years | Team | Apps | (Gls) |
| 1999–2003 | Bloemfontein Celtic | 78 | (?) |
| 2003–2005 | Jomo Cosmos | 26 | (0) |
| 2005–2015 | Moroka Swallows | 197 | (8) |

International career
| 2008–2009 | South Africa | 6 | (0) |
- * Club domestic league appearances and goals

Lefa Tsutsulupa (born 7 February 1980) is a South African former professional soccer player who played as a midfielder. He played internationally for South Africa.

== Career ==
Born in Ladybrand, Lefa began playing professional football with Bloemfontein Celtic at age 19. After the club was relegated to the First Division, he played for another two seasons before a brief spell with Jomo Cosmos before reviving his career with Moroka Swallows. He made over 300 appearances in the Premier Soccer League, most of them with Moroka Swallows. He captained for club for five seasons and won the 2008–09 Nedbank Cup during his time with Swallows.
