= David Radebe =

South African soccer player

Personal information
- Full name: David Mvula Radebe
- Date of birth: 27 September 1979 (age 47)
- Place of birth: Koppies, South Africa
- Height: 1.78 m (5 ft 10 in)
- Position: Striker

Senior career*
Years	Team	Apps	(Gls)
2000–2002	Free State Stars	29	(10)
2002–2007	Kaizer Chiefs	114	(29)
2007–2008	Bidvest Wits	16	(2)
2008–2010	Moroka Swallows	41	(7)
2010–2011	Batau		
2011–2012	United		
2012–2013	University of Pretoria	10	(2)
2013	Thanda Royal Zulu	8	(1)
2014	Santos	6	(1)
2014	Garankuwa United	10	(1)
2015	African Warriors	17	(4)
2016	Mthatha Bucks	2	(0)

International career
2003	South Africa	1	(0)
- * Club domestic league appearances and goals

David Radebe (born 27 September 1979) is a South African former soccer player who played as a striker.
