= Fanyana Mokoena =

South African soccer player

Personal information
- Full name: Fanyana Phillimon Mokoena
- Date of birth: 11 November 1978 (age 47)
- Place of birth: Nigel, South Africa
- Height: 1.78 m (5 ft 10 in)
- Positions: Right winger; striker

Youth career
- Dixilent Stars
- Alexandra United
- Bloemfontein Young Tigers

Senior career*
Years	Team	Apps	(Gls)
2005–2008	Free State Stars		
2008–	Mamelodi Sundowns		
2009	→Maritzburg United (loan)	12	(3)
- * Club domestic league appearances and goals

Fanyana Mokoena, previously Fanyana Dhladhla, (born 11 November 1978 in Nigel, Gauteng) is a South African association football winger and striker.
