= Ayanda Dlamini =

South African soccer player

Personal information
- Full name: Phelelani Ayanda Dlamini
- Date of birth: 11 October 1984 (age 42)
- Place of birth: Ulundi, South Africa
- Position: Striker

Youth career
- Citizens

Senior career*
Years	Team	Apps	(Gls)
2009–2016	AmaZulu	87	(22)
2016–2017	Bloemfontein Celtic		

Managerial career
- 2017–2019: AmaZulu Reserves
- 2019–2020: AmaZulu (assistant coach)
- 2020: AmaZulu
- * Club domestic league appearances and goals as of 15 November 2012 ‡ National team caps and goals as of 8 September 2010

Ayanda Dlamini (born 11 October 1984) is a South African former soccer player who played as a striker. He currently coaches AmaZulu Reserve. Dlamini played for AmaZulu from 2009 to 2016. He had a brief spell at Bloemfontein Celtic from 2016 to 2017. He hails from Kwa-Ceza near Ulundi in the KwaZulu-Natal province.
