= Brice Aka =

Ivorian footballer

Personal information
- Full name: Brice Aka
- Date of birth: 4 August 1983 (age 43)
- Place of birth: Abidjan, Côte d'Ivoire
- Height: 1.73 m (5 ft 8 in)
- Position: Striker

Team information
- Current team: Jomo Cosmos
- Number: 17

Youth career
- Vallee A.C. D'Adjame
- ASEC
- Raja Casablanca
- CODM Meknès
- Stade Rennais F.C.

Senior career*
Years	Team	Apps	(Gls)
2008–2014	Maritzburg United	54	(9)
2014–	Jomo Cosmos	4	(2)
- * Club domestic league appearances and goals

Brice Aka (born 4 August 1983 in Abidjan) is an Ivorian football player who currently plays for Jomo Cosmos.

== Career ==
Aka played previously for Vallee A.C. D'Adjame, ASEC Mimosas, in Morocco for Raja Casablanca, Club Omnisports De Meknes and with French side Stade Rennais F.C.

The ivory footballer starts a new career in the Cypriot club Doxa Katokopias.

== See also ==
- Jomo Cosmos
- ASEC Mimosas
- Abidjan
