= Clifford Ngobeni =

South African soccer player

Personal information
- Date of birth: 27 June 1987 (age 39)
- Place of birth: Soweto, South Africa
- Height: 1.65 m (5 ft 5 in)
- Position: Defensive midfielder

Youth career
- Robertsham
- Ajax Cape Town

Senior career*
Years	Team	Apps	(Gls)
2005–2010	Ajax Cape Town	91	(1)
2010–2011	Orlando Pirates	26	(0)
2012	Golden Arrows	13	(0)
2013–2015	Mpumalanga Black Aces	26	(2)
2017–2021	University of Pretoria	56	(0)
- * Club domestic league appearances and goals

Clifford Ngobeni (born 27 June 1987) is a South African former professional soccer player who played s a midfielder. He was chosen as PSL Club Rookie of the Year in August 2007.
