= Thulani Ngcepe =

South African soccer player

Personal information
- Full name: Thulani Innocent Ngcepe
- Date of birth: 19 January 1990 (age 36)
- Place of birth: Tsakane, South Africa
- Height: 1.78 m (5 ft 10 in)
- Position: Striker

Youth career
- Junior Rabbits
- Moroka Swallows

Senior career*
Years	Team	Apps	(Gls)
2007–2009	Moroka Swallows		
2009–2011	Supersport United	5	(0)
2012–2013	Royal Eagles	8	(2)
2015–2016	Bidvest Wits	3	(0)
- * Club domestic league appearances and goals

Thulani Innocent Ngcepe (born 19 January 1990 in Tsakane) is a South African football (soccer) striker.

On 14 January 2007, he became the youngest player ever to score a goal in the SA Premier League after scoring on his debut against Silver Stars.
