= Dominic Isaacs =

South African soccer player

Personal information
- Full name: Dominic Isaacs
- Date of birth: 13 July 1982 (age 44)
- Place of birth: Cape Town, South Africa
- Height: 1.77 m (5 ft 10 in)
- Position: Central defender

Youth career
- Sea Point Swifts
- Parkhurst United
- 1997–2000: School of Excellence

Senior career*
Years	Team	Apps	(Gls)
2000–2008	Ajax Cape Town	32	(0)
2008–2012	Kaizer Chiefs	50	(0)
2012–2013	Bloemfontein Celtic	20	(0)
2013–2015	Ajax Cape Town	30	(0)
2015–2016	Royal Eagles		

International career
1996–1999	South Africa U-17	14	(0)
1999–2002	South Africa U-20	16	(0)
2002–2005	South Africa U-23	9	(0)

Managerial career
- 2018: Cape Umoya United (assistant)
- 2018–2019: Cape Umoya United
- * Club domestic league appearances and goals

Dominic Isaacs (born 13 July 1982 in Cape Town) is a South African former soccer player who played as a defender in the Premier Soccer League. He then became a manager.

Isaacs hails from Mitchells Plain on the Cape Flats.
