= Martin Carelse =

South African soccer player

Personal information
- Full name: Martin Rodney Carelse
- Date of birth: 21 November 1980 (age 45)
- Place of birth: Alberton, South Africa
- Height: 1.75 m (5 ft 9 in)
- Position: Central defender

Team information
- Current team: Vasco da Gama
- Number: 27

Senior career*
Years	Team	Apps	(Gls)
–2002	Sporting FC	?	(?)
2002–2004	Kaizer Chiefs	?	(?)
2004–2006	Dynamos	?	(?)
2006–2008	AmaZulu	?	(?)
2008–2009	Ajax Cape Town	17	(0)
2009–2010	Free State Stars	22	(0)
2010–	Vasco da Gama	2	(0)
- * Club domestic league appearances and goals as of 11 September 2010

Martin Carelse (born 21 November 1980) is a South African soccer player who plays as a defender for Premier Soccer League club Vasco da Gama.
