= Keamogetse Wolff =

South African soccer player

Personal information
- Date of birth: 19 August 1988 (age 38)
- Place of birth: Bloemfontein, South Africa
- Positions: Left-back; central defender

Team information
- Current team: Mangaung FC
- Number: 3

Youth career
- Harmony Sports Academy
- Hellas FC

Senior career*
| Years | Team | Apps | (Gls) |
| 2007–2009 | Bloemfontein Celtic | ? | (?) |
| 2009–2010 | Jomo Cosmos | ? | (?) |
| 2011–2013 | Ajax Cape Town | 6 | (0) |
| 2013 | Chippa United | 3 | (0) |
| 2013– | Bidvest Wits | 0 | (0) |
- * Club domestic league appearances and goals as of 11 July 2013 ‡ National team caps and goals as of 11 July 2013

Keamogetse Wolff (born 19 August 1988) is a South African football (soccer) defender who plays for Premier Soccer League club Bloemfontein Celtic. Wolff is known for his agility and anaerobic endurance.

== Club career ==
He began his career in Bloemfontein Celtic in 2006 and continued to play for the team till 2009. He has played in various positions over the past 8 years including left wing, left back and defensive midfield.
