= Warren Bishop =

South African soccer player

Personal information
- Full name: Warren Bishop
- Date of birth: 17 March 1983 (age 43)
- Place of birth: Johannesburg, South Africa
- Position: Central defender

Youth career
- Wits University

Senior career*
Years	Team	Apps	(Gls)
–2009	University of Pretoria		
2009–2011	AmaZulu	19	(1)
2011	Mpumalanga Black Aces	8	(1)
2011–2012	Santos	4	(0)
2012–2014	University of Pretoria	9	(0)
- * Club domestic league appearances and goals

Warren Bishop (born 17 March 1983) is a South African former soccer player.
