= Erica Park =

Multi-use stadium, in Belhar, Cape Town, South Africa

- Interactive map of Erica Park
- Location: Erica Drive / Chestnut Way; Belhar, Cape Town, Western Cape, South Africa
- Coordinates: 33.943716°S 18.624541°E
- Capacity: N/A (only roofed stands)
- Surface: Grass

Tenant
- Ikapa Sporting (until June 2010)

Erica Park, sometimes also referred to as Erica Park Stadium, is a multi-use stadium, situated in the Belhar suburb of Cape Town, at the Western Cape Province in South Africa. Until June 2010, the stadíum was known as the sole home venue of Ikapa Sporting, but since then, the club -for unknown reasons- preferred instead to play their home games in the Wynberg suburb.

== Big events ==
The stadium is well known in South Africa, as the annual host of the Bayhill Premier Cup, also known as the Bayhill Tournament. This football tournament comprises the best 28 South African U19 teams, found after an initial qualification stage; supplemented by 4 International U19 teams, invited to make the tournament even more exciting. The tournament take place each year at the Easter holiday, where matches come thick and fast during the six days, as teams utilise all four fields at Erica Park simultaneously.

Erica Park was initially also selected to host the final playoff stage of the 2010-11 Vodacom League in June 2011, but was rejected after an inspection found the facilities inadequate. It was also selected to host the playoffs in the 2018–19 SAFA Second Division.
