= Tawonga Chimodzi =

Malawian footballer

Personal information
- Full name: Tawonga Chimodzi
- Date of birth: 26 June 1988 (age 38)
- Place of birth: Lilongwe, Malawi
- Height: 1.85 m (6 ft 1 in)
- Position: Midfielder

Team information
- Current team: Karmiotissa

Senior career*
Years	Team	Apps	(Gls)
2006–2007	Silver Strikers	12	(1)
2007–2013	Engen Santos	54	(1)
2013–2015	Iraklis Psachna	58	(5)
2015–2016	Platanias	1	(0)
2016–2017	AE Zakakiou	16	(0)
2017–2018	Sparti	16	(0)
2018–2019	ASIL Lysi	24	(0)
2019–	Karmiotissa	20	(1)

International career^{‡}
2006–	Malawi	11	(0)
- * Club domestic league appearances and goals as of 14:36, 21 May 2020 (UTC) ‡ National team caps and goals as of 16:42, 25 January 2017 (UTC)

Tawonga Chimodzi (born 26 June 1988) is a Malawian retired footballer, who is currently working as a data and performance analyst for his boyhood club, Silver Strikers. His last club as a professional midfielder was a Cypriot side Karmiotissa FC. He has also played for the Malawi national football team.

== Career ==
Chimodzi began his professional career with Silver Strikers in Malawi in 2006 before moving to South Africa, where he joined Engen Santos and made over 50 appearances between 2007 and 2013. He later signed for Greek side Iraklis Psachna in 2013, enjoying a productive spell with 58 league appearances and five goals. Short stints followed at Platanias, AE Zakakiou, and Sparti before he joined ASIL Lysi in Cyprus in 2018.

Ahead of the 2019–20 season, he signed with Karmiotissa FC in Cyprus, which became his final club as a professional player.
