= Tawfeeq Salie =

South African soccer player

Personal information
- Full name: Mogamat Tawfeeq Salie
- Date of birth: 21 July 1991 (age 35)
- Place of birth: Cape Town, South Africa
- Position: Goalkeeper

Team information
- Current team: All Stars

Youth career
- FC Fortune
- Santos
- Ajax Cape Town

Senior career*
| Years | Team | Apps | (Gls) |
| 2009–2012 | Ajax Cape Town | 1 | (0) |
| 2011–2012 | →Vasco da Gama (loan) | ? | (?) |
| 2012–2013 | Cape Town All Stars | ? | (?) |
| 2013–2016 | Maritzburg United | 8 | (0) |
| 2016– | All Stars | 0 | (0) |
- * Club domestic league appearances and goals as of 22 August 2016

Mogamat Tawfeeq Salie (born 21 July 1991 in Cape Town, Western Cape) is a South African football (soccer) goalkeeper who currently plays for National First Division club All Stars.
