= Nduduzo Sibiya =

South African soccer player

Personal information
- Date of birth: 2 June 1995 (age 31)
- Place of birth: Durban, South Africa
- Height: 1.70 m (5 ft 7 in)
- Position: Midfielder

Team information
- Current team: Golden Arrows
- Number: 11

Senior career*
Years	Team	Apps	(Gls)
2014–	Golden Arrows	213	(27)
2014	→ African Warriors	1	(0)

International career^{‡}
2017	South Africa	2	(0)
- * Club domestic league appearances and goals as of 4 January 2026 ‡ National team caps and goals as of 8 July 2024

Nduduzo Sibiya (born 2 June 1995) is a South African soccer player who plays as a midfielder for Lamontville Golden Arrows F.C. He made his international debut for South Africa at the 2017 COSAFA Cup.
