= Dumisani Ngwenya =

South African soccer player

Personal information
- Full name: Dumisani Michael Ngwenya
- Date of birth: 28 October 1984 (age 41)
- Place of birth: Pietermaritzburg, South Africa
- Position: Striker

Youth career
- Chelsea FC (South Africa)
- Maritzburg City

Senior career*
Years	Team	Apps	(Gls)
2005–2011	AmaZulu	119	(29)
2011–2012	Dynamos		
2012–2013	University of Pretoria	16	(0)
2014–2016	Baroka	10	(0)

International career
2008	South Africa	1	(0)
- * Club domestic league appearances and goals

Dumisani Ngwenya (born 28 October 1984 in Pietermaritzburg, KwaZulu-Natal) is a former South African footballer.

== Career ==
The striker previously played for AmaZulu and Dynamos. In 2022 he joined JDR Stars FC.

== International career ==
Ngwenya played his one and only game for the South Africa national soccer team in 2008.
