= Mark Haskins (soccer) =

South African soccer player

Personal information
- Full name: Mark Anthony Haskins
- Date of birth: 17 April 1981 (age 45)
- Place of birth: Johannesburg, South Africa
- Height: 1.70 m (5 ft 7 in)
- Position: Midfielder

Youth career
- Mondeor Meteors
- Jomo Cosmos

College career
Years	Team	Apps	(Gls)
- Florida Atlantic Owls

Senior career*
Years	Team	Apps	(Gls)
2001–2005	Jomo Cosmos		
2005–2009	Moroka Swallows	68	(5)
2009–	Bidvest Wits	41	(9)
2012	→ Jomo Cosmos (loan)	8	(1)
2012–2013	→ SuperSport United (loan)	11	(0)
- * Club domestic league appearances and goals

Mark Haskins (born 17 April 1981) is a South African retired footballer who last played as midfielder for SuperSport United F.C. on loan from Bidvest Wits in the Premier Soccer League.
