= Ikapa Sporting F.C. =

Ikapa Sporting FC
- Full name: Ikapa Sporting Football Club
- Nickname: Ikapa Warriors
- Founded: 2007
- Ground: Westridge Sports Complex, Mitchells Plain, Cape Town
- Capacity: N/A
- League: ABC Motsepe League
- 2025–26: 10th of 13 (Western Cape, Stream B)
- Website: ikapasportingfc.co.za
Home colours	Away colours

Ikapa Sporting is a football (soccer) club based in Cape Town, South Africa.

== History ==
The club was formed in 2007 after purchasing the status of Fidentia Rangers. The home venue of the club was Erica Park until May 2010, followed by a season where they opted to play home games at Wynberg Sports Ground and Ruyterwacht Sports Ground. After the club was relegated from the National First Division in May 2009, they struggled to find new strength, until a takeover in the 2010–11 season, where the previous owner of Battswood (Shaun Pietersen) and the owner of Turner Legal (Brandell Turner) arrived with financial support.

== Stadium ==
The home venue of the club until May 2010 was Erica Park, situated in the Belhar suburb of Cape Town. This was followed by a season where they opted to play at Wynberg Sports Ground and Ruyterwacht Sports Ground. The exact location of the two new fields, have not yet been confirmed by the club's website, although inspection of satellite photos suggest the first one perhaps might be a nickname for Wynberg Military Base Stadium in the Wynberg suburb, while the latter appear to be situated at Nassau Street in the Ruyterwacht suburb. During the 2014/2015 ABC Motsepe season the club owner, Shaun Pietersen, moved the franchise to Mitchells Plain. The team is currently playing all the home games at Erica Park in Belhar.
