= Diyo Sibisi =

South African soccer player

Personal information
- Full name: Diyo Mfiselwa Sibisi
- Date of birth: 14 April 1982 (age 44)
- Place of birth: Sahlumbe, KwaZulu-Natal, South Africa
- Height: 1.80 m (5 ft 11 in)
- Position: Striker

Team information
- Current team: Uthongathi FC
- Number: 29

Youth career
- Abaqulusi

Senior career*
Years	Team	Apps	(Gls)
2006–2009	Free State Stars	37	(14)
2009	Mamelodi Sundowns	10	(1)
2009–2011	Ajax Cape Town	28	(5)
2010–2011	→ Maritzburg United (loan)	28	(11)
2011–2012	Maritzburg United	26	(6)
2012–2013	Pretoria University	6	(0)
2013	→ Mpumalanga Black Aces (loan)	8	(1)
2014	Fico Tây Ninh	?	(?)
2017	Ladysmith United	?	(?)
2017–	Uthongathi FC	?	(?)
- * Club domestic league appearances and goals

Diyo Sibisi (born 14 April 1982 in Sahlumbe, KwaZulu-Natal) is a South African football (soccer) striker who plays for Fico Tây Ninh in the Vietnamese First Division.
