= Khabo Zondo =

South African soccer coach

John Khabonina Zondo (born 24 December 1961) is a South African association football coach.

He managed Royal Eagles from 2015 to 2016, and Royal AM from 2022.

His previous clubs include Bloemfontein Celtic, Golden Arrows and Classic FC.

He also worked as an assistant coach for Bafana Bafana.
