= Jan Sillo =

South African soccer player

Personal information
- Full name: Jan Masoeng Sillo
- Date of birth: 28 November 1976
- Place of birth: Botshabelo, South Africa
- Date of death: 11 August 2009 (aged 32)
- Place of death: Harrismith, South Africa
- Position: Right-back

Senior career*
Years	Team	Apps	(Gls)
2004–2006	Bloemfontein Young Tigers		
2007–2009	AmaZulu		
- * Club domestic league appearances and goals

Jan Masoeng Sillo (28 November 1976 – 11 August 2009) was a South African professional football player for AmaZulu F.C.

== Death ==
Sillo died on 11 August 2009, when the car he was driving overturned on the N5 highway near Harrismith in the Free State. He had previously played for Bloemfontein Young Tigers and is survived by his wife and one child.
