= Oscar Ntwagae =

South African soccer player

Personal information
- Full name: Oscar Selele Ntwagae
- Date of birth: 22 July 1977
- Place of birth: Brakpan, South Africa
- Date of death: 27 August 2010 (aged 33)
- Position: Defender

International career^{‡}
Years	Team	Apps	(Gls)
2002–2010	South Africa	15	
- ‡ National team caps and goals as of 13 February 2007

Oscar Selele Ntwagae (22 July 1977, in Brakpan, Gauteng – 27 August 2010, in Germiston, Gauteng) was a South African soccer player who played as a defender for Premier Soccer League club Platinum Stars.

Platinum Stars had confirmed before his death that he had just rejoined the club on a three-year deal.

The 31-year-old left Stars for Mamelodi Sundowns in 2005 and spent three seasons with The Brazilians before joining city rivals SuperSport United in the off-season.

Ntwagae was killed on 27 August 2010 after being knocked down by a motorist in Germiston after coming back from Jomo Cosmos training where he was attending trials.
