= Zhaimu Jambo =

Zimbabwean footballer (born 1987)

Personal information
- Full name: Zhaimu Jambo
- Date of birth: 23 August 1987 (age 39)
- Place of birth: Harare, Zimbabwe
- Positions: Central defender; left-back

Youth career
- Dynamos

Senior career*
Years	Team	Apps	(Gls)
2005–2009	Gunners F.C.		
2009–2014	Kaizer Chiefs	54	(2)

International career^{‡}
2007–2011	Zimbabwe	11	(0)
- * Club domestic league appearances and goals as of 30 May 2012 ‡ National team caps and goals as of 14 November 2020

Zhaimu "Jimmy" Jambo (born 23 August 1987) is a retired Zimbabwean footballer who last played as a left-footed defender for Kaizer Chiefs in the South African Premier Soccer League and Zimbabwe.

His most prolific season in the South African Premier Soccer League was in 2009/10, making 20 appearances, bagging a goal and finishing third with Kaizer Chiefs.
