= Ruben Cloete =

South African footballer

Personal information
- Date of birth: 3 November 1982 (age 43)
- Place of birth: Upington, South Africa
- Height: 1.81 m (5 ft 11 1/2 in)
- Positions: Left-back; left midfielder

Youth career
- Paballelo Chiefs

Senior career*
Years	Team	Apps	(Gls)
2003–2007	Santos	41	(4)
2007–2010	Free State Stars	54	(1)
2010–2012	Orlando Pirates	35	(0)
2012–2014	Maritzburg United	49	(0)
2014–2015	Bloemfontein Celtic	14	(0)
2015–2016	Chippa United	20	(0)
Total		213	(5)

International career
2011	South Africa	1	(0)
- * Club domestic league appearances and goals

Ruben Cloete (born 3 November 1982) is a South African soccer player who played as a defender. He played for Santos, Free State Stars, Orlando Pirates, Maritzburg United, Bloemfontein Celtic, Chippa United and the South Africa national team.
