= Njabulo Manqana =

South African soccer player (born 1986)

Personal information
- Full name: Njabulo Eric Manqana
- Date of birth: 26 August 1986 (age 40)
- Place of birth: Durban, South Africa
- Height: 1.72 m (5 ft 8 in)
- Position: Midfielder

Youth career
- Golden Arrows
- Ntuzuma Bees
- Royal Coastal

Senior career*
Years	Team	Apps	(Gls)
2005–2012	Golden Arrows		
2012–2013	Orlando Pirates	0	(0)
2013–2014	AmaZulu	41	(1)
2014–2015	Royal Eagles	2	(0)
- * Club domestic league appearances and goals

Njabulo Manqana (born 26 August 1986 in Durban) is a South African football (soccer) midfielder who among others played for Premier Soccer League club AmaZulu.
