= Pere Ariweriyai =

Nigerian footballer (born 1983)

Personal information
- Date of birth: 19 October 1983 (age 43)
- Place of birth: Rivers State, Nigeria
- Height: 1.83 m (6 ft 0 in)
- Position: Central defender

Youth career
- Water Stars
- Bright Stars

Senior career*
Years	Team	Apps	(Gls)
2004–2005	North West Tigers		
2005–2006	Silver Stars		
2006–2011	AmaZulu		
2011–2013	Santos	16	(0)
- * Club domestic league appearances and goals

Pere Ariweriyai (born 19 October 1983 in Rivers State) is a Nigerian footballer who played in South Africa.
