= Brent Carelse =

South African soccer player

Personal information
- Full name: Brent Jon Carelse
- Date of birth: 30 March 1981 (age 45)
- Place of birth: Westbury, Johannesburg, South Africa
- Height: 1.76 m (5 ft 9 in)
- Position: Midfielder

Youth career
- Westcolts
- School of Excellence
- Hellenic

Senior career*
Years	Team	Apps	(Gls)
2000–2001	Hellenic		
2001–2007	Ajax Cape Town	105	(16)
2007–2008	Mamelodi Sundowns	34	(4)
2008–2011	Supersport United	50	(6)
2011–2012	Ajax Cape Town	37	(9)
2012–2014	Chippa United	24	(4)
2014–2015	Cape Town All Stars	13	(2)
2016	Hellenic		

International career
2007	South Africa	1	(0)
- * Club domestic league appearances and goals

Brent Carelse (born 30 March 1981) is a South African former soccer player who played as a midfielder. He played club football for Hellenic, Ajax Cape Town, Mamelodi Sundowns, Supersport United, Chippa United, Cape Town All Stars, and international football for South Africa.

== Club career ==
In February 2016, he rejoined his former club Hellenic.

== International career ==
He made one appearance for South Africa in 2007.

== Coaching career ==
He was appointed as under-19 coach at Cape Town City in March 2017.

== Personal life ==
Like Steven Pienaar, Carelse was born in Westbury, a township on the outskirts of Johannesburg. He is the son of former footballer Dougie Carelse.
