= Bizana Pondo Chiefs F.C. =

- Full name: Bizana Pondo Chiefs Football Club
- Nickname: Lions of Skoomplas
- Founded: 2015; 11 years ago
- League: SAFA Second Division
- Website: https://bizanapondochiefsfc.co.za/

Bizana Pondo Chiefs is a South African professional football club based in Mhlanga Location in Bizana, Eastern Cape, founded in 2015.

The club earned promotion to the National First Division after winning the 2019–20 SAFA Second Division, becoming the first team from the small, rural town of Bizana to play in the second tier. Chiefs finished bottom of the 2020–21 National First Division, and were relegated to the 2020–21 SAFA Second Division.

== Honours ==
- 2019–20 SAFA Second Division
