= Cecil Oerson =

South African soccer player

Personal information
- Full name: Cecil Trevor Oerson
- Date of birth: 18 December 1978 (age 47)
- Place of birth: Springfontein, South Africa
- Height: 1.70 m (5 ft 7 in)
- Position: Right winger

Senior career*
Years	Team	Apps	(Gls)
–2002	Bloemfontein Young Tigers	?	(?)
2002–2004	Bloemfontein Celtic	?	(?)
2004–2009	Moroka Swallows	106	(12)
2009–2012	Bloemfontein Celtic	55	(5)

International career^{‡}
2006	South Africa	1	(0)
- * Club domestic league appearances and goals as of 17 June 2012 ‡ National team caps and goals as of 17 May 2011

Cecil Oerson (born 18 December 1978) is a South African soccer player who plays as a midfielder. He played for Bloemfontein Young Tigers, Bloemfontein Celtic and Moroka Swallows, and represented the Bafana Bafana once.
