= Sifiso Vilakazi =

South African footballer

Personal information
- Date of birth: 11 September 1979
- Place of birth: South Africa
- Position(s): Attacker

Senior career*
Years	Team	Apps	(Gls)
- Free State Stars F.C.
-2009/10	Ajax Cape Town F.C.	18+	(5+)
2010-2012	Bidvest Wits F.C.	47	(11)
2012/2013	AmaZulu F.C.	8	(0)
2013/2014	Royal Eagles F.C.	7	(1)
- *Club domestic league appearances and goals

Sifiso Vilakazi (born 11 September 1979 in South Africa) is a South African retired footballer.

== Career ==
While playing for Bidvest Wits, Vilakazi received an offer from Orlando Pirates, one of the most successful teams in South Africa, but declined it due to his age and also because he wanted to retire at Bidvest Wits, a decision he later regretted. Instead, Vilakazi moved to AmaZulu, but regretted it after playing less than he expected, despite earning more money.
