= Rudi Isaacs =

South African soccer player

Personal information
- Full name: Rudi Charles Isaacs
- Date of birth: 31 January 1986 (age 40)
- Place of birth: Cape Town, South Africa
- Height: 1.80 m (5 ft 11 in)
- Positions: Right back; defensive midfielder

Youth career
- RAU
- Hellenic

Senior career*
Years	Team	Apps	(Gls)
2003–2004	Hellenic	17	(0)
2004–2006	Pretoria University	26	(0)
2006–2010	Supersport United	36	(2)
2007	→ Moroka Swallows (loan)	13	(1)
2010–2011	Vasco da Gama	28	(0)
2011–2015	Moroka Swallows	86	(3)
2015–2017	Highlands Park	34	(0)
Total		240	(6)

International career
2005	South Africa	1	(0)
- * Club domestic league appearances and goals

Rudi Isaacs (born 31 January 1986) is a South African former soccer player who played as a defender or midfielder. He was capped for South Africa.
