= Thabo Mongalo =

South African soccer player

Personal information
- Full name: Thabo Tsweheng Mongalo
- Date of birth: 23 September 1984 (age 42)
- Place of birth: Botlokwa, South Africa
- Height: 1.80 m (5 ft 11 in)
- Position: Striker

Team information
- Current team: F.C. AK

Senior career*
Years	Team	Apps	(Gls)
–2009	Black Leopards	?	(?)
2009–2011	Supersport United	?	(?)
2011	→Platinum Stars (loan)	?	(?)
2011–2012	Black Leopards	13	(2)
2013–	F.C. AK		
- * Club domestic league appearances and goals as of 19 June 2012 ‡ National team caps and goals as of 19 June 2012

Thabo Mongalo (born 23 September 1984 in Botlokwa, Limpopo) is a South African association football striker who plays for F.C. Makompo.
