= Ryan Botha =

South African soccer player

Personal information
- Full name: Ryan David Botha
- Date of birth: 5 January 1981 (age 45)
- Place of birth: South Africa
- Positions: Winger; forward

Senior career*
Years	Team	Apps	(Gls)
- Stella FC
- SuperSport United F.C.
- Bidvest Wits F.C.
- Jomo Cosmos
2001	Tervarit		
2001–2003	Myllykosken Pallo −47	42	(10)
2004	FC Inter Turku	19	(5)
2004–2005	Denizlispor	4	(0)
2006	Kokkolan Palloveikot		
2006–2007	FC Inter Turku	9	(1)
2007	Enosis Neon Paralimni FC		
2007–2008	Thanda Royal Zulu F.C.		
2008–2010	Moroka Swallows F.C.	9+	(1)
2010–2011	Platinum Stars F.C.	1	(0)
2012	Vasco da Gama	5	(0)
- * Club domestic league appearances and goals

Ryan Botha (born 5 January 1981 in South Africa) is a South African retired footballer who now works as a model and trainer in his home country.

== Career ==
Botha started his senior career with Stella. In 2001, he signed for Myllykosken Pallo −47 in the Finnish Veikkausliiga, where he made forty-two league appearances and scored ten goals.
