= Bradley Ritson =

South African soccer player

Personal information
- Full name: Bradley James Ritson
- Date of birth: 27 March 1982 (age 44)
- Place of birth: Durban, South Africa
- Height: 1.79 m (5 ft 10 in)
- Position: Striker

Youth career
- Langford FC
- St. Neots Town
- Escombe FC
- Stella FC

Senior career*
Years	Team	Apps	(Gls)
2008–2010	AmaZulu	51	(11)
2010–2011	Moroka Swallows	15	(4)
2011–2012	Bidvest Wits	10	(0)
- * Club domestic league appearances and goals as of 11 May 2012 ‡ National team caps and goals as of 11 May 2012

Bradley Ritson (born 27 March 1982) is a retired South African football striker.

He worked as a plumber until he signed his first professional contract in 2008 joining AmaZulu from Stella FC, an amateur club in Durban. Ritson retired in 2013 and now works as a plumber again.
