= Gert Schalkwyk =

South African soccer player

Personal information
- Full name: Gert Patrick Schalkwyk
- Date of birth: 9 April 1982 (age 44)
- Place of birth: Klerksdorp, South Africa
- Height: 1.70 m (5 ft 7 in)
- Position: Attacking midfielder

Team information
- Current team: Bostancı Bağcıl

Youth career
- Oliver Isaacs FC
- Leicester City
- Klerksdorp City
- DI Classic
- Dellforce FC

Senior career*
Years	Team	Apps	(Gls)
2001–2002	Free State Stars		
2002–2004	Wits University	38	(3)
2004–2009	Kaizer Chiefs	47	(10)
2009	→ Bloemfontein Celtic (loan)	11	(6)
2009–2011	Orlando Pirates	15	(1)
2010–2011	→ Maritzburg United (loan)	15	(3)
2012	Santos	5	(1)
2013–	Bostancı Bağcıl	0	(0)

International career^{‡}
2003–2010	South Africa	7	(0)
- * Club domestic league appearances and goals as of 14 October 2013 ‡ National team caps and goals as of 14 October 2013

Gert Schalkwyk (born 9 April 1982 in Klerksdorp, North West) is a South African soccer player who plays as a midfielder for Bostancı Bağcıl in the Northern Cyprus Birinci Lig.

== International career ==
Schalkwyk played during 2003 and 2010 seven times for the South African national football team.
