= Mabhuti Khenyeza =

South African soccer player

Personal information
- Full name: Elliot Mabhuti Khenyeza
- Date of birth: 17 June 1982 (age 44)
- Place of birth: Howick, South Africa
- Height: 1.73 m (5 ft 8 in)
- Position: Striker

Team information
- Current team: Black Leopards FC (Head coach)

Senior career*
Years	Team	Apps	(Gls)
2001–2002	Maritzburg City	12	(2)
2002–2007	Golden Arrows	114	(43)
2007–2008	Kaizer Chiefs	26	(8)
2008–2009	Ajax Cape Town	24	(16)
2009–2012	Mamelodi Sundowns	56	(10)
2012	Supersport United	15	(3)
2013	Ajax Cape Town	12	(7)
2013–2015	Mpumalanga Black Aces	23	(4)
2015–2016	Golden Arrows	27	(9)
2016–2019	AmaZulu	58	(9)

International career^{‡}
2003–2009	South Africa	10	(0)
- * Club domestic league appearances and goals as of 14 November 2022 ‡ National team caps and goals as of 14 November 2022

Mabhuti Khenyeza (sometimes misspelled 'Khanyeza', born 17 June 1982 in Howick, KwaZulu) is a South African soccer manager and a retired South African professional footballer.

== Playing career ==
Khenyeza joined Kaizer Chiefs from Lamontville Golden Arrows in July 2007 after he had spent five seasons at the KwaZulu-Natal-based team and scored 43 goals in the 102 official league and cup matches that between 2002 and 2007.

Khenyeza scored on his official debut for Chiefs on the opening night of the 2007–2008 season, after coming close to scoring, hitting the cross bar twice in the game.

He managed to find the back of the net against Benoni Premier United from the penalty spot in the final minute of the game, which gave him a goal on debut. , Khenyeza's move to Chiefs is a step in the right direction as apart from the possibility of adding silverware to his cupboards he has put himself in a stronger position to receive more national team call ups.

The player who made his name at Lamontville Golden Arrows is remembered for his wonder goal against Chief's arch rivals Orlando Pirates in November 2007, a goal he scored just nineteen seconds into the game.

=== Ajax Cape Town ===
Khenyeza moved to Ajax CT in 2008 after he fell out with Kaizer Chiefs coach Muhsin Ertugral. He arrive as a free agent and he was one of the top scorer of 2008–2009 season. At the end of the season left the club and signed for Mamelodi Sundowns.

=== Mamelodi Sundowns ===
Khenyeza became a regular first team player in the team. He had 10 goals and 9 assists in 57 games.

=== Supersport United ===
After leaving Mamelodi Sundowns for free in January 2012 he signed for Supersport United. In total he played 22 games for the club, fifteen as a starter. He scored four goals and provided three assists.

=== Ajax Cape Town ===
Khenyeza rejoined Ajax CT in January 2013.

== Coaching career ==
Khenyeza was appointed coach of TS Galaxy in February 2020 and has also coached at Golden Arrows (until December 2024), Chippa United and Komani United. In November 2025, he took over as head coach of Black Leopards.
