= Mthokozisi Yende =

South African soccer player

Personal information
- Full name: Mthokozisi Vincent Yende
- Date of birth: 7 June 1984 (age 42)
- Place of birth: Tembisa, Johannesburg, South Africa
- Height: 1.80 m (5 ft 11 in)
- Positions: Midfielder; striker

Youth career
- Benoni Premier United

Senior career*
Years	Team	Apps	(Gls)
–2006	Tembisa Classic		
2006–2009	University of Pretoria		
2009–2013	Kaizer Chiefs	43	(1)
2012–2013	→ Maritzburg United (loan)	18	(0)
2013–2014	Free State Stars	11	(0)
2014–2015	Moroka Swallows	3	(0)
- * Club domestic league appearances and goals as of 10 November 2022

Mthokozisi Yende (born 7 June 1984 in Tembisa) is a retired South African professional footballer, who played for Maritzburg United in the Premier Soccer League, and Kaizer Chiefs. He started his professional career at Benoni Premier United and has also played for Tembisa Classic, University of Pretoria before moving to Kaizer Chiefs for an undisclosed fee in July 2009.

== Career ==
=== Early career ===
Yende started out at his hometown club Tembisa Classic, before moving to University of Pretoria in National First Division in 2006.

=== Kaizer Chiefs ===
On 1 July 2009 he moved to Kaizer Chiefs in the Premier Soccer League, the top division in South Africa. He moved for an Undisclosed fee, and was mainly a fringe player but towards the end of the 2009–10 season he got his chance to impress. He scored his first goal for the club in aleague match away to SuperSport United.

== Career statistics ==
Club	Season	League		Cup		OTD		Continental		Other		Total	
Club	Season	Apps	Goals	Apps	Goals	Apps	Goals	Apps	Goals	Apps	Goals	Apps	Goals
Kaizer Chiefs	2009–10	20	1	4	0	0	0	0	0	3	0	27	1
Kaizer Chiefs	2010–11	6	0	3	0	0	0	0	0	2	0	11	0

Statistics accurate as of match played 26 October 2010
