= Franklin Cale =

South African football midfielder

Personal information
- Date of birth: 10 May 1983 (age 43)
- Place of birth: Cape Town, South Africa
- Height: 1.73 m (5 ft 8 in)
- Position: Winger

Youth career
- FC Fortune
- Ajax Cape Town
- Steenberg United

Senior career*
Years	Team	Apps	(Gls)
2004–2009	Ajax Cape Town	131	(16)
2009–2012	Mamelodi Sundowns	36	(2)
2012–2013	SuperSport United	30	(4)
2013–2016	Ajax Cape Town	40	(4)
2016–2017	Highlands Park	25	(0)
2017–2018	Ubuntu Cape Town	16	(1)

International career
2009–2010	South Africa	5	(0)
- * Club domestic league appearances and goals as of 13 February 2018

Franklin Cale (born 10 May 1983) is a South African football midfielder who plays for National Professional Soccer League club Ubuntu Cape Town.

== Personal ==
He hails from Ocean View, Cape Town.

== Career ==
Long poised for an overseas move Cale joined Mamelodi Sundowns in December 2009 for a reported fee of R5.5m. This effectively made him one of the most expensive players in the history of South African soccer.

== International career ==
He made his international debut in a friendly against Norway on 10 October 2009. He has so far been capped five times.
