= Brett Evans (soccer, born 1982) =

South African footballer

Personal information
- Full name: Brett Lund Evans
- Date of birth: 8 March 1982 (age 44)
- Place of birth: Johannesburg, South Africa
- Height: 1.77 m (5 ft 10 in)
- Position: Left back

Youth career
- Mighty Pa
- Maritzburg City
- School of Excellence

Senior career*
| Years | Team | Apps | (Gls) |
| 1999–2012 | Ajax Cape Town | 311 | (19) |

International career
| 2002–2008 | South Africa | 10 | (0) |

Managerial career
- 2015–: Point Loma Nazarene University
- * Club domestic league appearances and goals

Brett Evans (born 8 March 1982 in Johannesburg, Gauteng) is a South African footballer who played for Premier Soccer League club Ajax Cape Town. Evans was a founding member of Ajax Cape Town and played for Ajax for the whole of his 13-year career. Brett Evans is currently the head coach for boys youth at Albion SC as well as assistant coach at Point Loma Nazarene University.

== Ajax Cape Town ==
Evans was a founding member of Ajax Cape Town making his debut in 1999. He played for Ajax for the whole of his 13-year career and has 311 starts which is a club record. In 2012, Evans went on trial with Major Soccer League club Portland Timbers and played in a 2–0 win over Seattle Sounders FC in a reserve team match. Evans suffered knee and groin injuries and left Ajax in 2012 on expiration of his contract.

== International career ==
He is one of the few South African player s to have played for all the national teams and was also part of South Africa's squad at the 2008 African Cup of Nations. He has ten full international caps.

== Coaching career ==
While playing left back at Ajax CT, Evans was assistant coach for the youth u12 team, from 2010 to 2012. He is currently head coach at Albion SC and assistant coach at Point Loma Nazarene University.
