= Lamontville Golden Arrows F.C. =

Association football club in South Africa

Golden Arrows
- Full name: Lamontville Golden Arrows Football Club
- Nicknames: Abafana Bes'thende (The Backheel Boys)
- Founded: 1943; 83 years ago, bought Ntokozo FC franchise in 1996
- Ground: King Zwelithini Stadium, Umlazi
- Capacity: 10,000
- Chairman: Mato Madlala
- Coach: (South Africa) Manqoba Mngqithi
- League: South African Premiership
- 2025–26: 6th of 16
- Website: https://www.goldenarrowsfc.com/
Home colours	Away colours

Lamontville Golden Arrows F.C. is a South African soccer club based in Durban that plays in the Premiership.

== History ==
It was founded in 1943 in the streets of Lamontville, a township in Durban. The club played in the defunct National Professional Soccer League in the 1970s until they were relegated in 1976. They played in the Second Division thereafter until 1980 when they were embroiled in a soccer scandal and thrown out of the National Professional Soccer League.

The team was formed again in 1996 when the Madlala family bought the Second Division franchise of Ntokozo FC and changed its name to Lamontville Golden Arrows.

In 2000 they won promotion to the Premiership by winning the National First Division Coastal Stream.

Arrows claimed their first piece of major silverware when they won the 2009 MTN 8, routing Ajax Cape Town 6–0 in the final played at Orlando Stadium.

== Honours ==
=== League ===
- 1999–2000 – National First Division Coastal Stream Champions (2nd tier)
- 2014–15 – National First Division (2nd tier)

=== Cups ===
- MTN 8: 2009

=== Pre-season tournaments ===
- 2011 – KZN Premier's Cup

Former club crest

== Club records ==
- Most starts: (South Africa) Thanduyise Khuboni 212 (2006–2014) (previous record, Siyabonga Sangweni 173 (2005–2011)
- Most goals: (Zimbabwe) Knox Mtizwa (2018–present) 55
- Most capped player: (Zambia) Joseph Musonda, 108
- Most starts in a season: (South Africa) Thanduyise Khuboni, 35 (2011/12)
- Most goals in a season: (South Africa) Richard Henyekane 22 (2008/09)
- Record victory: 6–0 vs Platinum Stars (18/3/09, Premiership)
- Record defeat: 1-7 vs Orlando Pirates FC (06/04/2024, Premiership)

=== League positions ===
==== National First Division (Coastal) ====
- 1997–98 – 5th
- 1998–99 – 3rd
- 1999–2000 – 1st (promoted)

==== South African Premiership ====
- 2000–01 – 9th
- 2001–02 – 13th
- 2002–03 – 5th
- 2003–04 – 9th
- 2004–05 – 9th
- 2005–06 – 6th
- 2006–07 – 12th
- 2007–08 – 9th
- 2008–09 – 5th
- 2009–10 – 12th
- 2010–11 – 11th
- 2011–12 – 13th
- 2012–13 – 13th
- 2013–14 – 16th (relegated)

==== National First Division ====
- 2014–15 – 1st (promoted)

==== South African Premiership ====
- 2015–16 – 9th
- 2016–17 – 8th
- 2017–18 – 8th
- 2018–19 – 10th
- 2019–20 – 12th
- 2020–21 – 4th
- 2021–22 – 9th
- 2022–23 – 9th
- 2023–24 – 9th
- 2024–25 – 12th
- 2025–26 – 6th

== First team squad ==
As of 16 August, 2026

Note: Flags indicate national team as defined under FIFA eligibility rules; some limited exceptions apply. Players may hold more than one non-FIFA nationality.

No.	Pos.	Nation	Player
2	DF	RSA	Sazi Gumbi
3	DF	RSA	Khulekani Shezi
4	DF	RSA	Ayanda Jiyane
8	MF	RSA	Siyanda Mthanti
11	FW	RSA	Nduduzo Sibiya
12	MF	RSA	Velemseni Ndwandwe
13	DF	ZAM	John Mwengani
14	MF	RSA	Angelo Van Rooi
17	FW	RSA	Thokozani Khumalo
18	FW	CHA	Junior Dion
19	GK	RSA	Dumisani Msibi
20	DF	RSA	Osborn Maluleke
22	FW	RSA	Jerome Karelse
23	MF	RSA	Lungelo Dube
24	MF	RSA	Nqobeko Dlamini
25	MF	RSA	Ayabulela Maxwele
26	DF	CIV	Eroine Agnikoi

No.	Pos.	Nation	Player
27	GK	RSA	Thakasani Mbanjwa
28	FW	RSA	Ronaldo van Neel
29	DF	RSA	Sabelo Sithole
30	DF	RSA	Sbonelo Cele
32	GK	RSA	Xolani Ngcobo
34	GK	NAM	Edward Maova
35	DF	RSA	Themba Mantshiyane
36	FW	RSA	Philani Kumalo
38	DF	RSA	Ntandoyenkosi Mabaso
39	FW	RSA	Alwande Booysen
40	FW	RSA	Lungelo Nguse
41	MF	RSA	Nhlanhla Zwane
43	MF	RSA	Tshenzhelani Radzadzhi
44	FW	RSA	Bongani Cole
47	DF	RSA	Sboniso Madonsela
49	FW	RSA	Nhlanhla Gasa

=== Foreigners ===
In the South African Premiership, only five non-South African nationals can be registered. Foreign players who have acquired permanent residency can be registered as locals. Namibians born before 1990 can be registered as South Africans.

- (Malawi) Limbikani Mzava
- (Zimbabwe) Danny Phiri

permanent residency

- (Namibia) Chris Katjiukua
- (Namibia) Maximilian Mbaeva

== Notable former coaches ==
- (Zambia) Jan Simulambo (2001)
- (South Africa) Khabo Zondo (8 Feb 2005 – 9 January 2007)
- (South Africa) Manqoba Mngqithi (10 Jan 2007 – 30 June 2010)
- (Montenegro) Zoran Filipović (12 July 2010 – 21 March 2011)
- (Germany) Ernst Middendorp (22 March 2011 – 30 September 2011)
- (Turkey) Muhsin Ertuğral (3 Oct 2011 – 22 October 2012)
- (South Africa) Manqoba Mngqithi (23 Oct 2012 – 5 October 2013)
- (England) Mark Harrison (7 Oct 2013 – 10 February 2014)
- (South Africa) Shaun Bartlett (interim) (10 Feb 2014 – 30 June 2014)
- (South Africa) Shaun Bartlett (1 July 2014 – 15 June 2015)
- (South Africa) Serame Letsoaka (15 June 2015 – 1 December 2015)
- (South Africa) Clinton Larsen (6 Dec 2015 –27 Dec 2018)
- (South Africa) Steve Komphela (27 Dec 2018 –)
- (South Africa) Mabhuti Khenyeza (? – March 2024)
- (South Africa) Steve Komphela (March 2024 –)
