= 2017 Telkom Knockout =

Tournament details
- Country: South Africa
- Dates: 27 October – 2 December
- Teams: 16

Final positions
- Champions: Bidvest Wits
- Runner-up: Bloemfontein Celtic

Tournament statistics
- Matches played: 15
- Goals scored: 29 (1.93 per match)

The 2017 Telkom Knockout was the 36th edition of the Telkom Knockout, a South African cup competition comprising the 16 teams in the Premiership. It took place between October and December 2017.

== Results ==
=== First round ===
27 October 2017	Maritzburg United	0–0 (a.e.t.) (1–3 p)	Platinum Stars	Harry Gwala Stadium, Pietermaritzburg
20:00		Report
	Penalties
	Fransman (penalty missed); Mokate (penalty missed); Xulu (penalty scored); Youlley (penalty missed)		Masalesa (penalty missed); Zulu (penalty scored); Mere (penalty scored); Ntuli (penalty scored)

28 October 2017	Polokwane City	0–0 (a.e.t.) (4–3 p)	Ajax Cape Town	Peter Mokaba Stadium, Polokwane
		Report

28 October 2017	Golden Arrows	0–1	Orlando Pirates	Princess Magogo Stadium, KwaMashu
		Report	Qalinge 35'

28 October 2017	Bloemfontein Celtic	2–2 (a.e.t.) (5–4 p)	SuperSport United	Dr. Petrus Molemela Stadium, Bloemfontein
	Rikhotso 78'; Motshegwa 82'	Report	Modiba 31'; Brockie 55'
	Penalties
	Rikhotso (penalty scored); Mabena (penalty scored); Phalane (penalty missed); Baloyi (penalty scored); Letlabika (penalty scored); Tignyemb (penalty scored)		Phala (penalty scored); Furman (penalty scored); Modiba (penalty scored); Daniels (penalty missed); Brockie (penalty scored); Lakay (penalty missed)

28 October 2017	Kaizer Chiefs	3–0	AmaZulu	Moses Mabhida Stadium, Durban
	Maluleka 32'; Ekstein 55'; Tshabalala 59'	Report

28 October 2017	Bidvest Wits	4–2 (a.e.t.)	Free State Stars	Bidvest Stadium, Johannesburg
	Khumalo 21'; Gamal 44', 95'; Keene 116'	Report	Maphakisa 24'; Mthembu 77'

29 October 2017	Baroka	1–0	Cape Town City	Peter Mokaba Stadium, Polokwane
	Chawapiwa 15'; Matloga (yellow card) 83'	Report	Putsche (yellow card) 34'; Mkhize (yellow card) 83'

29 October 2017	Chippa United	1–0	Mamelodi Sundowns	Sisa Dukashe Stadium, Mdantsane
	Julies 63'	Report

=== Quarterfinals ===
4 November 2017	Platinum Stars	1–2	Bloemfontein Celtic	Royal Bafokeng Stadium, Rustenburg
	Ntuli 30'	Report	Phalane 58'; Mabaso 81'

4 November 2017	Bidvest Wits	1–0	Baroka	Bidvest Stadium, Johannesburg
	Gamal 11'	Report

4 November 2017	Orlando Pirates	2–2 (a.e.t.) (2–4 p)	Polokwane City	Orlando Stadium, Johannesburg
	Nyauza 13'; Makola 45'	Report	Ndou 2', 41'

5 November 2017	Chippa United	0–1	Kaizer Chiefs	Nelson Mandela Bay Stadium, Port Elizabeth
		Report	Parker 31' (pen.)

=== Semifinals ===
18 November 2017	Bidvest Wits	1–0	Kaizer Chiefs	Bidvest Stadium, Johannesburg
	Keene 28'; Frosler (yellow card) 76'; Pienaar (yellow card) 90'	Report	Katsande (yellow card) 27'; Meyiwa (red card) 27'; Malongoane (yellow card) 87'

19 November 2017	Polokwane City	1–1 (a.e.t.) (3–4 p)	Bloemfontein Celtic	Peter Mokaba Stadium, Polokwane
	Mbonani (yellow card) 42'; Maluleke (yellow card) 43'; Semenya (yellow card) 45'; Seabi (yellow card) 101'; Ndou 115'	Report	Letlabika (yellow card) 43'; Mabaso 103'; Phalane (yellow card) 109'; Mabena (yellow card) 111'

=== Final ===
2 December 2017	Bidvest Wits	1–0	Bloemfontein Celtic	Princess Magogo Stadium, Durban
	Pule (yellow card) 75' (goal) 90+1'; Monare (yellow card) 78'	Report	Rikhotso (yellow card) 49'
