= 2015–16 Nedbank Cup =

ke yona (the one)

Tournament details
- Country: South Africa

Final positions
- Champions: SuperSport United (4th title)
- Runners-up: Orlando Pirates

The Nedbank Cup is a South African club football (soccer) tournament. The knockout tournament, based on the English FA Cup format, was one of a weak opponent facing a stronger one. The competition was sponsored by ABSA until 2007, after which Nedbank took over sponsorship.

== Results ==
=== First round ===
15 December 2015	Witbank Spurs	0–2	Santos
14:00

15 December 2015	Stellenbosch	2–3	Mbombela
14:00

15 December 2015	Bush Bucks	2–0	Cape Town All Stars
14:00

15 December 2015	Moroka Swallows	4–0	F.C. Cape Town
14:00

15 December 2015	Highlands Park	4–3	Milano United
14:00

15 December 2015	African Warriors	1–1 (1–3 p)	Black Leopards
14:00

15 December 2015	Baroka	1–0	Royal Eagles
14:30

15 December 2015	Amazulu	4–1	Thanda Royal Zulu
14:30

=== Second round ===
2 March 2016	Maritzburg United	3–1	Black Leopards	Harry Gwala Stadium, Pietermaritzburg
19:30	Lentjies 17', 83' (pen.); Shandu 71'		Nyundu 23'

2 March 2016	Santos	1–0	Bush Bucks	Athlone Stadium, Athlone
19:30	Rayners 57'

4 March 2016	Steenberg	1–1 (a.e.t.) (4–5 p)	Platinum Stars	Athlone Stadium, Athlone
20:00	Rhode 110'		Rodgers 96'

4 March 2016	Bidvest Wits	1–0	Bloem Celtic	Bidvest Stadium, Johannesburg
20:00	Keene 25'

5 March 2016	Orlando Pirates	2–0	Kaizer Chiefs
14:00	Ndoro 76', 83'

5 March 2016	Golden Arrows	2–1	Milford FC	King Zwelithini Stadium, Durban
14:00	Chapman 37'; Mahachi 66' (pen.)		Vilane 68'

5 March 2016	EC Bees	1–2	Magesi FC	Buffalo City Stadium, East London
15:00	Gawe 87'		Nhlabathi 44'; Makhubu 54'

5 March 2016	Ajax Cape Town	1–2	Free State Stars
17:00	Chabalala 45+2' (o.g.)		Vilakazi 44'; Nkosi 65'

5 March 2016	University of Pretoria	5–0	Polokwane City Rovers FC
19:15	Kebede 12'; Nyondo 33'; Mthethwa 39', 90'; Ntombayithethi 49'

6 March 2016	United Rovers FC	0–7	Cape Town City
14:00			Nonyane 7'; Ngoma 14' (pen.), 33'; Jayiya 54', 86', 88'; Mulenga 80'

6 March 2016	Sibanye	0–4	Mbombela
14:00			Ndlovu 10'; Nana 73', 90+1'; Sekome 81'

6 March 2016	Polokwane	2–0	African All Stars
14:00	Tlolane 10', 20'

6 March 2016	Highlands Park	0–1 (a.e.t.)	Mamelodi Sundowns
14:00			Dolly 96'

6 March 2016	Chippa United	2–3	Baroka
14:00	Mbenyane 44'; Manzini 63'		Motshegwa 27', 60'; Simandla 30'

8 March 2016	Moroka Swallows	0–1	Supersport United
18:30			Brockie 52'

8 March 2016	Jomo Cosmos	1–1 (3–2 p)	Amazulu
18:30	Mukamba 23'		Mukuka 73'

=== Third round ===
1 April 2016	Magesi FC	0–6	Bidvest Wits
20:00			Klate 22', 41', 45' (pen.), 82'; Seete 24' (o.g.); Maduwa 81' (o.g.)

2 April 2016	Platinum Stars	1–2 (a.e.t.)	Polokwane
15:00	Ng'ambi 11'		Manaka 45+2'; Nyadombo 110' (pen.)

2 April 2016	Cape Town City	2–0	Maritzburg United
15:00	Mbesuma 20'; Mzava 90+2'

2 April 2016	Santos	0–1 (a.e.t.)	Free State Stars
20:15			Rayners 95' (o.g.)

2 April 2016	Mamelodi Sundowns	3–1	Mbombela
20:15	Dolly 25'; Malajila 69'; Zwane 79'		Mnguni 76'

3 April 2016	Jomo Cosmos	1–3	Orlando Pirates
15:00	Mashumba 25'		Ndoro 3', 49'; Memela 44'

3 April 2016	Golden Arrows	0–2	Baroka
15:00			Motshegwa 44' (pen.); Simandla 75'

5 April 2016	SuperSport United	3–3 (4–2 p)	University of Pretoria	Atteridgeville Super Stadium, Pretoria
19:30	Morton 26'; Brockie 73'; Nel 84'		Nemukondeni 12'; Chikohwa 53'; Kekana 58' (o.g.)

=== Quarter-finals ===
22 April 2016	SuperSport United	2–1	Cape Town City
20:00	Brockie 68'; Grobler 89'		Moseamedi 5'

23 April 2016	Free State Stars	0–0 (5–4 p)	Bidvest Wits
15:00

23 April 2016	Mamelodi Sundowns	0–2 (a.e.t.)	Orlando Pirates
20:15			Ndoro 109'; Makola 113'

24 April 2016	Polokwane	0–2	Baroka
15:00			Mothupa 42'; Makgaka 45+1'

=== Semi-finals ===
14 May 2016	Free State Stars	2–4	Orlando Pirates
15:00	Nkosi 54'; Mohomi 90'		Mohomi 24' (o.g.); Memela 37', 84'; Gabuza 89'

14 May 2016	SuperSport United	2–0	Baroka	Atteridgeville Super Stadium, Pretoria
20:15	Brockie 47'; Phala 53'

=== Final ===
28 May 2016
15:00

Supersport United	3–2	Orlando Pirates
Brockie 13'; Grobler 29'; Boxall 40'	Report	Memela 11'; Daniels 52' (o.g.)

Peter Mokaba Stadium, Polokwane
