= 2011–12 National First Division =

National First Division
- Season: 2011–12
- Champions: Tuks FC
- Promoted: Chippa United
- Relegated: Carara Kicks; Atlie FC
- Matches: 240
- Goals: 631 (2.63 per match)
- Top goalscorer: David Radebe (17)

The 2011–12 National First Division was the season from September 2011 until May 2012 of South Africa's second tier of professional football.

For the first time since the 2003–04 National First Division season, all teams were placed in one unified league table. Previously the competition had been split into two 'streams'.

== Summary ==
At the conclusion of the season Tuks FC secured their promotion to the Premiership after topping the table. Second-placed Chippa United and third-placed Thanda Royal Zulu were joined by Santos of the Premiership in a three team promotion and relegation playoff. At the conclusion of the playoffs, Chippa United, only established in 2010, secured their promotion to the Premiership, in the process relegating Santos to the National First Division. This was Chippa United's second successive promotion as they had only just earned promotion to the National First Division.

Atlie FC and Carara Kicks were relegated at the end of the season. Carara Kicks were only relegated after being deducted points for fielding an ineligible player, sparing Dynamos.

== League table ==
Pos	Team	Pld	W	D	L	GF	GA	GD	Pts	Promotion or relegation
1	Tuks FC (C, P)	30	15	10	5	45	25	+20	55	Promotion to Premiership
2	Chippa United	30	14	9	7	46	29	+17	51	Qualification to 2011–12 PSL Playoff Tournament
3	Thanda Royal Zulu	30	13	11	6	34	28	+6	50	Qualification to 2011–12 PSL Playoff Tournament
4	Blackburn Rovers	30	14	7	9	44	37	+7	49	
5	FC AK	30	12	9	9	45	43	+2	45	
6	African Warriors	30	11	10	9	43	36	+7	43	
7	Vasco da Gama	30	12	7	11	51	45	+6	43	
8	FC Cape Town	30	10	9	11	38	36	+2	39	
9	United FC	30	10	9	11	46	45	+1	39	
10	Bay United	30	8	11	11	32	40	−8	35	
11	Sivutsa Stars FC	30	9	7	14	39	47	−8	34	
12	Witbank Spurs	30	9	7	14	32	42	−10	34	
13	Mpumalanga Black Aces	30	7	12	11	33	41	−8	33	
14	Dynamos	30	9	5	16	37	49	−12	32	
15	Atlie FC (R)	30	6	10	14	24	42	−18	28	Relegation to Vodacom League
16	Carara Kicks (R)	30	9	11	10	42	46	−4	20 (Note: Eighteen points deducted)	Relegation to Vodacom League

(C) Champions; (P) Promoted; (R) Relegated

== PSL playoff tournament ==
The teams that finished second and third during the 2011-12 National First Division season were joined by the team that finished 15th in the Premiership season in a 3-team promotion and relegation playoff called the PSL Playoff Tournament.

=== Participants ===
Team	League	Pos
Santos	2011–12 Premiership	15th
Chippa United	2011–12 National First Division	2nd
Thanda Royal Zulu	2011–12 National First Division	3rd

=== Format ===
The 3 teams participated in a mini-league in which they played one another twice (home and away) with log points being awarded for winning a match (3 points) and drawing a match (1 point). At the conclusion of the mini-league phase the team that was in first place would either earn or maintain their place in the Premiership for the 2012–13 season. If the team that finished 15th in the Premiership was unable to win the mini-league, they were relegated to the National First Division for the 2012-13 season.

=== Playoff table ===
At the conclusion of the PSL Playoff Tournament Chippa United had topped the mini-league after defeating Santos 4-3 in the final game, earning their place in the PSL for the 2012-13 season. As they were unable to win the mini-league, Santos failed to maintain their place in the PSL and were relegated to the National First Division for the 2012-13 season.

Pos	Team	Pld	W	D	L	GF	GA	GD	Pts	Promotion or relegation
1	Chippa United (P)	4	2	2	0	8	4	+4	8	Promotion to 2012–13 Premiership
3	Santos (R)	4	1	1	2	5	6	−1	4	Relegation to 2012–13 National First Division
2	Thanda Royal Zulu	4	1	1	2	3	6	−3	4	

(P) Promoted; (R) Relegated

=== Results ===
23 May 2012
14:00

Thanda Royal Zulu	0 – 1	Santos
	Report	Rodgers 12'

Richards Bay Sports Stadium, Richards Bay
Attendance: 2,000

16 June 2012
15:00

Chippa United	1 – 1	Thanda Royal Zulu
Ngebo 55'	Report	Nwadike 47'

Philippi Stadium, Philippi

20 June 2012
19:30

Santos	0 – 0	Chippa United
	Report

Athlone Stadium, Cape Town

23 June 2012
20:15

Santos	1 – 2	Thanda Royal Zulu
Morris 19'	Report	Mvalo 52'; Sitayitayi 57'

Athlone Stadium, Cape Town

27 June 2012
14:00

Thanda Royal Zulu	0 – 3	Chippa United
	Report	Mbenyane 6'; Shumana 57'; Sali 88'

Richards Bay Sports Stadium, Richards Bay

30 June 2012
15;00

Chippa United	4-3	Santos
Dlamini 10'; Mbenyane 27'; Twala 76'; Shumana 81'	Report	Rodgers 28', 89'; Arendse 40'

Philippi Stadium, Philippi
Attendance: 2,000

== Player eligibility dispute ==
Carara Kicks fielded a player who had not been properly registered by the club and appeared in league games. As a result, Carara Kicks had 18 points removed from their total and were relegated.
