= 2012–13 South African Premiership =

Premiership
- Season: 2012–13
- Champions: Kaizer Chiefs
- Relegated: Black Leopards
- Champions League: Kaizer Chiefs
- Confederation Cup: SuperSport United
- Matches: 240
- Goals: 546 (2.28 per match)
- Top goalscorer: Katlego Mashego (13 goals)
- Biggest home win: Platinum Stars 4-0 Free State Stars (27 October 2012)
- Biggest away win: AmaZulu 0-6 Kaizer Chiefs (11 August 2012)
- Highest scoring: Platinum Stars 6-4 Golden Arrows (8 December 2012)
- Average attendance: 6, 722

The 2012–13 South African Premiership season (known as the ABSA Premiership for sponsorship reasons) was the seventeenth season of the Premiership since its establishment in 1996. The season began in the second week of August 2012.

Orlando Pirates were the defending champions, having won the previous 2011–12 season, but lost their title to Kaizer Chiefs. The season featured 14 teams from the 2011-12 season and two new teams promoted from the 2011–12 National First Division: Tuks FC and Chippa United who replacer relegated Santos and Jomo Cosmos.

== Format changes ==
The 2012–13 season saw the introduction of the Q-innovation system. The league schedule was split into four fixture-blocks referred to as quarters, the first and third blocks had eight fixtures, the second and fourth blocks had seven fixtures.

Prize money was given to the teams who finish top of the table after each block of fixtures.

== Prize money ==
Achievement	Prize money
1st place at end of quarter 1	1.5m ZAR
1st place at end of quarter 2	1.5m ZAR
1st place at end of quarter 3	1.5m ZAR
1st place at end of quarter 4	1.5m ZAR
Overall league winner	10m ZAR

== Teams ==
A total of 16 teams contested the league, including 14 sides from the 2011–12 season and two promoted from the 2011–12 National First Division.

Relegation for Jomo Cosmos to the 2012–13 National First Division was confirmed on 16 May 2012, as Jomo Cosmos maintained their reputation as a yo-yo club, suffering their third relegation from the Premiership in five seasons. Santos had finished 15th and thus had to go through the 2011-12 PSL Playoff Tournament alongside Chippa United and Thanda Royal Zulu of the National First Division. Santos were unable to retain their place in the Premiership following a 4–3 defeat in the final game of the Playoff Tournament on 30 June 2012 and were subsequently relegated to the National First Division for the 2012-13 season.

Tuks FC earned promotion to the Premiership as 2011-12 National First Division Champions. Chippa United, who had finished second in the 2011-12 National First Division season, earned their place in the PSL after defeating Santos and Thanda Royal Zulu in the 3-team PSL promotion tournament. Both teams made their first appearances in the PSL.

=== Stadiums and locations ===
Football teams in South Africa tend to use multiple stadiums over the course of a season for their home games. The following table will only indicate the stadium used most often by the club for their home games

Team	Location of training field	Province	Home venue	Capacity
Ajax Cape Town	Cape Town (Parow)	Western Cape	Cape Town Stadium	55,000
AmaZulu	Durban (Durban North)	Kwazulu-Natal	Moses Mabhida Stadium	54,000
Bidvest Wits	Johannesburg (Braamfontein)	Gauteng	Bidvest Stadium	5,000
Black Leopards	Polokwane	Limpopo	Peter Mokaba Stadium	45,000
Bloemfontein Celtic	Bloemfontein	Free State	Seisa Ramabodu Stadium	20,000
Chippa United	Nyanga	Western Cape	Philippi Stadium^{1}	10,000
Free State Stars	Bethlehem	Free State	Charles Mopeli Stadium	35,000
Golden Arrows	Umlazi	Kwazulu-Natal	King Zwelithini Stadium	10,000
Kaizer Chiefs	Johannesburg (Soweto)	Gauteng	FNB Stadium (Soccer City)	94,700
Mamelodi Sundowns	Chloorkop	Gauteng	Loftus Versfeld Stadium	52,000
Maritzburg United	Pietermaritzburg	Kwazulu-Natal	Harry Gwala Stadium	10,700
Moroka Swallows	Johannesburg (Soweto)	Gauteng	Dobsonville Stadium	24,000
Orlando Pirates	Johannesburg (Soweto)	Gauteng	Orlando Stadium	36,400
Platinum Stars	Rustenburg (Phokeng)	North West	Royal Bafokeng Stadium	45,000
Supersport United	Pretoria (Atteridgeville)	Gauteng	Lucas Moripe Stadium	28,900
Tuks FC	Pretoria	Gauteng	Tuks Stadium	8,000

- ^1 Chippa United will use Athlone Stadium for their home games, because the Philippi Stadium was not up to PLS standards. Games against Pirates and Chiefs will be played at Cape Town Stadium.
Location of teams in the 2012–13 PSL.

=== Personnel and kits ===
Team	Manager	Supplier	Shirt sponsor
Ajax Cape Town	(Turkey) Muhsin Ertugral	Adidas	MTN
AmaZulu	(South Africa) Craig Rosslee	Adidas	SPAR
Bidvest Wits	(South Africa) Clive barker	Nike	Bidvest ^{2}
Black Leopards	(South Africa) Abel Makhubele	Kappa	MTN
Bloemfontein Celtic	(South Africa) Clinton Larsen	Reebok	MTN
Chippa United	(England) Mark Harrison	Umbro	Vodacom
Free State Stars	(South Africa) Steve Komphela	Maxed	Bonitas
Golden Arrows	(South Africa) Manqoba Mngqithi	Millé	MTN
Kaizer Chiefs	(Scotland) Stuart Baxter	Nike	Vodacom
Mamelodi Sundowns	(South Africa) Pitso Mosimane	Nike	Ubuntu Bhotho ^{2}
Maritzburg United	(Germany) Ernst Middendorp	Umbro	Vacant
Moroka Swallows	(Portugal) Zeca Marques	Puma	VW
Orlando Pirates	(South Africa) Roger De Sa	Adidas	Vodacom
Platinum Stars	(South Africa) Cavin Johnson	Umbro	The Royal Marang Hotel ^{2}
Supersport United	(South Africa) Gavin Hunt	Kappa	DStv ^{2}
Tuks FC	(South Africa) Steve Barker	Umbro	Vacant

- ^2 Sponsor linked to team ownership

=== Managerial changes ===
Team	Outgoing manager	Manner of departure	Date of vacancy	Position in table	Incoming manager	Date of appointment
Kaizer Chiefs	(South Africa) Ace Khuse	Caretaker period ended	May 2012	End of season	(Scotland) Stuart Baxter	7 May 2012
Moroka Swallows	(South Africa) Gordon Igesund	Appointed coach of South Africa	30 June 2012	End of season	(Portugal) Zeca Marques	2 July 2012
Chippa United	(South Africa) Roger Sikhakhane	Redeployed	July 2012	End of season	(South Africa) Manqoba Mngqithi	9 July 2012
Bidvest Wits	(South Africa) Roger De Sa	Sacked	9 July 2012	End of season	(Spain) Antonio López Habas	12 July 2012
Chippa United	(South Africa) Manqoba Mngqithi	Sacked	22 August 2012	15	(South Africa) Roger Sikhakhane	13 September 2012
Orlando Pirates	(Peru) Augusto Palacios	Health Reasons	10 September 2012	9	(South Africa) Roger De Sa	10 September 2012
Ajax Cape Town	(Netherlands) Maarten Stekelenburg	Sacked	2 October 2012	15	(Netherlands) Jan Versleijen	11 February 2013
Golden Arrows	(Turkey) Muhsin Ertugral	Quit	22 October 2012	13	(South Africa) Manqoba Mngqithi	23 October 2012
Chippa United	(South Africa) Roger Sikhakhane	Sacked	29 October 2012	15	(South Africa) Farouk Abrahams	11 December 2012
Black Leopards	(Zimbabwe) Sunday Chidzambwa	Promoted to Technical Director	30 October 2012	11	(South Africa) Ian Palmer	30 October 2012
AmaZulu	(Sweden) Roger Palmgren	Sacked	26 November 2012	16	(South Africa) Craig Rosslee	30 October 2012
Mamelodi Sundowns	(Netherlands) Johan Neeskens	Sacked	2 December 2012	15	(South Africa) Pitso Mosimane	2 December 2012
Black Leopards	(South Africa) Ian Palmer	Sacked	2 January 2013	12	(South Africa) Abel Makhubele	9 January 2013
Wits	(Spain) Antonio López Habas	Mutual consent	4 January 2013	9	(South Africa) Clive Barker	4 January 2012
Chippa United	(South Africa) Farouk Abrahams	Redeployed	29 January 2013	15	(South Africa) Wilfred Mugeyi	30 January 2013
Chippa United	(South Africa) Wilfred Mugeyi	Sacked	11 April 2013	16	(England) Mark Harrison	12 April 2013
Ajax Cape Town	(Netherlands) Jan Versleijen	Quit	25 April 2013	15	(Turkey) Muhsin Ertugral	25 April 2013

== League table ==
Pos	Team	Pld	W	D	L	GF	GA	GD	Pts	Qualification or relegation
1	Kaizer Chiefs (C)	30	15	12	3	48	21	+27	57	Qualification for 2014 CAF Champions League
2	Platinum Stars	30	17	5	8	48	27	+21	56	
3	Orlando Pirates	30	14	10	6	39	23	+16	52	
4	Bidvest Wits	30	11	11	8	34	32	+2	44	
5	Bloemfontein Celtic	30	11	9	10	32	33	−1	42	
6	SuperSport United	30	8	17	5	30	26	+4	41	Qualification for 2014 CAF Confederation Cup (Note: Winner of the 2012–13 Nedbank Cup will qualify for the 2014 CAF Confederation Cup.)
7	Free State Stars	30	10	11	9	32	32	0	41	
8	University of Pretoria	30	8	16	6	34	29	+5	40	
9	Moroka Swallows	30	11	7	12	41	41	0	40	
10	Mamelodi Sundowns	30	9	12	9	31	27	+4	39	
11	Maritzburg United	30	9	12	9	31	31	0	39	
12	AmaZulu	30	7	11	12	22	35	−13	32	
13	Golden Arrows	30	8	7	15	28	39	−11	31	
14	Ajax Cape Town	30	7	10	13	34	46	−12	31	
15	Chippa United (R)	30	6	10	14	28	41	−13	28	Qualification for Premiership Playoff Tournament
16	Black Leopards (R)	30	5	8	17	34	63	−29	23	Relegation to National First Division

Updated to match(es) played on 18 May 2013. Source: kickoff.com
Rules for classification: 1) points; 2) goal difference; 3) number of goals scored.
(C) Champions; (R) Relegated

== PSL playoff tournament ==
The teams that finished second and third during the 2012-13 National First Division season were joined by the team that finished 15th in the Premiership in a 3-team promotion and relegation playoff called the PSL Playoff Tournament.

=== Participants ===
Team	League	Pos
Chippa United	Premiership	15th
Santos	2012–13 National First Division	2nd
Mpumalanga Black Aces	2012–13 National First Division	3rd

=== Format ===
The 3 teams participated in a mini-league in which they played one another twice (home and away) with log points being awarded for winning a match (3 points) and drawing a match (1 point). At the conclusion of the mini-league phase the team that was in first place would either earn or maintain their place in the Premiership for the 2013-14 season. If the team that finished 15th in the league was unable to win the mini-league, they were relegated to the National First Division for the 2013–14 season.

=== Playoff table ===
Pos	Team	Pld	W	D	L	GF	GA	GD	Pts	Qualification or relegation
1	Mpumalanga Black Aces (P)	4	2	2	0	4	2	+2	8	
2	Chippa United (R)	4	1	2	1	1	1	0	5	
3	Santos	4	0	2	2	2	4	–2	2	

Pld = Matches played; W = Matches won; D = Matches drawn; L = Matches lost; GF = Goals for; GA = Goals against; GD = Goal difference; Pts = Points
(R) = Relegated; (P) = Promoted

=== Results ===
29 May 2013

Chippa United	0 – 0	Santos

Philippi Stadium, Cape Town

1 June 2013
15:00

Mpumalanga Black Aces	1 – 0	Chippa United
Masina 88'	Report

Themba Senamela Stadium, Middelburg

20 June 2013
19:30

Santos	1 – 2	Mpumalanga Black Aces
V. Wana 51'	Report	59' T. Qalinge; 64' D. Sibisi

Cape Town Stadium, Cape Town

23 June 2013
15:00

Santos	0 – 1	Chippa United
		19' Mbenyane

Athlone Stadium, Cape Town
Referee: Victor Hlungwani

26 June 2013
19:30

Chippa United	0 – 0	Mpumalanga Black Aces

Cape Town Stadium, Cape Town

29 June 2013
14:00

Mpumalanga Black Aces	1 – 1	Santos
90' Hills		79' Masaole

Themba Senamela Stadium, Middelburg

== Results ==
Home \ Away	AJX	AMZ	BVW	BLP	BLC	CHU	FSS	GOL	KZC	MLS	MAR	MOR	ORL	PLA	SUP	TUK
Ajax Cape Town		0–0	0–2	0–1	2–2	3–2	4–2	3–0	3–1	0–0	1–0	1–1	2–2	4–1	1–1	1–5
AmaZulu	0–1		1–1	4–0	1–0	1–2	0–1	0–0	0–6	0–0	0–0	2–1	1–1	1–0	0–0	1–0
Bidvest Wits	0–0	3–1		2–2	2–0	2–1	1–1	1–0	1–3	0–2	2–1	2–0	0–1	1–2	0–0	0–0
Black Leopards	2–1	1–1	0–2		3–2	0–0	1–2	2–1	1–3	2–5	2–2	0–1	0–4	0–1	3–3	1–3
Bloemfontein Celtic	2–1	1–0	3–0	1–1		1–0	2–2	1–0	0–3	0–1	1–1	2–1	1–0	2–1	2–1	1–2
Chippa United	1–1	1–1	1–1	3–1	1–0		1–2	1–2	0–2	1–1	0–1	2–1	0–0	2–1	2–2	2–2
Free State Stars	2–1	2–1	2–0	3–2	1–0	3–0		1–1	0–0	1–1	1–0	0–1	1–1	0–1	1–1	0–0
Golden Arrows	2–0	0–1	1–2	0–0	0–1	2–0	1–0		0–0	1–0	0–1	2–0	0–2	2–1	0–1	0–1
Kaizer Chiefs	3–0	2–0	1–1	2–1	0–0	2–0	2–1	3–0		2–1	1–1	3–2	0–0	0–0	1–1	1–1
Mamelodi Sundowns	3–1	1–1	2–2	1–0	0–1	1–0	2–1	1–1	0–0		1–2	0–1	1–3	0–1	0–0	1–1
Maritzburg United	1–1	2–0	0–1	2–1	2–1	2–0	1–1	2–2	1–1	0–3		0–1	1–2	0–1	0–0	1–1
Moroka Swallows	3–1	1–2	1–1	2–2	1–1	1–1	1–0	4–1	1–3	2–0	1–3		3–2	2–0	1–3	2–3
Orlando Pirates	2–0	0–0	2–0	4–1	1–1	0–1	1–0	2–1	1–1	0–1	2–3	0–3		1–0	1–0	0–0
Platinum Stars	3–0	2–1	2–1	4–0	2–0	1–1	4–0	6–4	2–0	1–1	2–0	3–1	0–1		3–0	2–2
SuperSport United	2–1	3–0	1–1	3–2	1–1	2–1	0–0	2–2	1–2	1–0	0–0	0–0	0–0	0–1		1–0
Tuks FC	0–0	3–1	1–2	1–2	1–1	1–0	1–1	0–2	1–0	1–1	1–1	1–1	1–3	0–0	0–0	

Updated to match(es) played on 18 May 2013. Source: http://www.kickoff.com/league/201213-absa-premiership/match-centre#tab_mc-table
Legend: Blue = home team win; Yellow = draw; Red = away team win.

== Prize money ==
Position	Prize money (ZAR)
1	10m
2	5m
3	3m
4	2m
5	1.5m
6	1.3m
7	1.1m
8	1m
9	750k
10	700k
11	650k
12	600k
13	550k
14	500k
15	450k
16	400k

== Statistics ==
Top goalscorers As of 18 May 2013

Rank	Player	Club	Goals
1	(South Africa) Katlego Mashego	Moroka Swallows	13
2	(South Africa) Bernard Parker	Kaizer Chiefs	12
3	(Zimbabwe) Cuthbert Malajila	Maritzburg United	11
4	(South Africa) Bennett Chenene	Moroka Swallows	10
4	(Senegal) Mame Niang	Pretoria University	10
4	(South Africa) Mabhuti Khenyeza	SuperSport United and Ajax Cape Town	10
4	(Botswana) Mogakolodi Ngele	Platinum Stars	10
8	(South Africa) Rodney Ramagalela	Black Leopards	9
8	(South Africa) Lehlohonolo Majoro	Kaizer Chiefs	9
9	(South Africa) Welcome Qalanto	Chippa United	8

Source: Premier Soccer League

== Attendances ==
The Soweto Derby on 8 December 2013 attracted the highest crowd with 84,000. The second-highest crowd was the Soweto Derby on 9 March 2013 with 80,000.

No.	Club	Average
1	Kaizer Chiefs	17,821
2	Orlando Pirates	13,138
3	Bloemfontein Celtic	9,607
4	Mamelodi Sundowns	9,938
5	Ajax Cape Town	9,588
6	Maritzburg United	7,263
7	SuperSport United	5,731
8	Lamontville Golden Arrows	5,607
9	Chippa United	5,073
10	Bidvest Wits	4,098
11	University of Pretoria	3,931
12	AmaZulu	4,297
13	Moroka Swallows	3,205
14	Free State Stars	3,359
15	Platinum Stars	2,958
16	Black Leopards	1,119

== See also ==
- CAF 5 Year Ranking
