= 2016–17 Nedbank Cup =

2016-17 Nedbank Cup
ke yona (the one)

Tournament details
- Country: South Africa

Final positions
- Champions: SuperSport United (5th title)
- Runners-up: Orlando Pirates

The 2016–17 Nedbank Cup is a South African club football (soccer) tournament. The knockout tournament, based on the English FA Cup format, was one of a weak opponent facing a stronger one.

== Qualifying round ==
7 December 2016	Stellenbosch	1–0	Thanda Royal Zulu	Coetzenburg Stadium, Stellenbosch
13:30	Patel 86'

7 December 2016	Cape Town All Stars	1–1 (a.e.t.) (4–1 p)	Mthatha Bucks	Parow Park Stadium, Cape Town
15:00	Maphanga 45'		Ngebo 5'

7 December 2016	Cape Town	4–3	Black Leopards	NNK Rugby Stadium, Cape Town
15:00	Chivaviro 9'; Matlakala 69'; Pietersen 72'; Sithole 84' (pen.)		Musonda 18', 51', 85' (pen.)

7 December 2016	Magesi	1–0 abandoned	Jomo Cosmos	Pietersburg Stadium, Polokwane
15:00	Ngwepe 13'

7 December 2016	University of Pretoria	1–2	Witbank Spurs	Tuks Stadium, Pretoria
15:00	Gordinho 37'		Tshehla 24'; Lebyane 88'

7 December 2016	Royal Eagles	3–2	Milano United	Harry Gwala Stadium, Pietermaritzburg
15:00

7 December 2016	Santos	1–1 (a.e.t.) (3–4 p)	AmaZulu	Athlone Stadium, Cape Town
15:00	Arendse 17'		Lumkwana 9'

7 December 2016	Mbombela United	2–1	Real Kings	KaNyamazane Stadium, Nelspruit
15:30

13 December 2016 (replay)

Magesi 0–4 Jomo Cosmos

== Round of 32 ==
6 Mar 2017

Mamelodi Sundowns 2 : 0 Mariveni United

8 Mar 2017

Polokwane City 3 : 1 African All Stars FC

11 Mar 2017

Jomo Cosmos 3 : 0 United Rovers FC

Kwadukuza United 2 : 2 (aet, 4 : 3 pen.) Ajax Cape Town FC

Buya Msuthu 0 : 2 Bloemfontein Celtic

FC Cape Town 0 : 2 Baroka

Free State Stars 2 : 0 Highlands Park

Stellenbosch Univ. 0 : 3 Kaizer Chiefs

12 Mar 2017

Golden Arrows 3 : 1 Maritzburg United

Days 2 : 5 Mbombela United

Acornbush United 1 : 0 Cape Town FC

Eastern Cape Bees 1 : 3 Orlando Pirates

15 Mar 2017

Cape Town All Stars 0 : 2 Bidvest Wits

Platinum Stars FC 3 : 2 AmaZulu FC

FC Royals 1 : 2 Supersport United

Chippa United 1 : 0 Witbank Spurs

== Round of 16 ==
4 Apr 2017

Kwadukuza United 0 : 2 Supersport United

Jomo Cosmos 1 : 1 (aet, 5 : 4 pen.) Bidvest Wits

Baroka 0 : 1 (aet) Platinum Stars FC

8 Apr 2017

Chippa United 2 : 0 Polokwane City

Mamelodi Sundowns 0 : 1 Golden Arrows

Free State Stars 1 : 4 Orlando Pirates

9 Apr 2017

Bloemfontein Celtic 2 : 1 Mbombela United

Acornbush United 1 : 2 Kaizer Chiefs

== Quarter finals ==
22 April 2017
20h30

Orlando Pirates	2–1 (a.e.t.)	Bloemfontein Celtic
54' Mobara; 103' Gabuza		87' Mahlasela

Orlando Stadium, Soweto
22 April 2017
18h00

Kaizer Chiefs	1–1 (a.e.t.)	Supersport United
81' Mphahlele		72' Brockie
Penalties
	3-5

FNB Stadium, Johannesburg
22 April 2017
15h00

Chippa United	1–0	Jomo Cosmos
72' Manzini

Nelson Mandela Bay Stadium, Port Elizabeth
22 April 2017
15h00

Golden Arrows	1–0	Platinum Stars
40' Bilankulu

Princess Magogo Stadium, Durban

== Semi finals ==
20 May 2017
15h00

Chippa United	0–0 (a.e.t.)	Supersport United
Penalties
	2-4

Sisa Dukashe Stadium, East London
21 May 2017
15h00

Golden Arrows	0–1	Orlando Pirates
		34' Mobare

Princess Magogo Stadium, Durban

== Final ==
24 June 2017
20:15

Supersport United	4–1	Orlando Pirates
Grobler 32', 64'; Brockie 61'; Nkhatha 82'	Report	Manyisa 90+3'

Moses Mabhida Stadium, Durban
