= 2012 Telkom Knockout =

Tournament details
- Country: South Africa

Final positions
- Champions: Bloemfontein Celtic (1st title)

Tournament statistics
- Matches played: 14
- Goals scored: 37 (2.64 per match)
- Attendance: 111,234 (7,945 per match)
- Top goal scorer(s): Collins Mbesuma (Orlando Pirates) - 2

The 2012 Telkom Knockout is a football (soccer) knockout competition which comprised the 16 teams in the South African Premier Soccer League. It was the 21st tournament, and the 7th under the Telkom Knockout name. The tournament is effectively South Africa's league cup, as entry is open only to clubs in the top league. The cup is usually played in the first half of the season. The tournament began on 17 October and ended on 1 December 2012.

In all matches there has to be a winner on the day, this will be decided if there is a winner after full-time (90 minutes). If teams are tied at full-time then extra time will be played, penalties will decide the winner if the scores are still even (there is no golden goal rule).

== Teams ==
The 16 teams that competed in the Telkom Knockout competition are: (listed in alphabetical order).

- 1. Ajax Cape Town
- 2. AmaZulu
- 3. Bidvest Wits
- 4. Black Leopards
- 5. Bloemfontein Celtic
- 6. Chippa United
- 7. Free State Stars
- 8. Golden Arrows
- 9. Kaizer Chiefs
- 10. Mamelodi Sundowns
- 11. Maritzburg United
- 12. Moroka Swallows
- 13. Orlando Pirates
- 14. Platinum Stars
- 15. Supersport United
- 16. University of Pretoria

== Prize money ==
- The Telkom Knockout is the highest paying cup competition in Africa with a grand total prize money of R 14,200,000.
- Each team taking part in the Telkom Knockout will receive a participation fee of R 250,000.

=== First-round losers ===
- Prize money: R 200,000
- Participation fee: R 250,000
- Total: R 450f000 for 8 teams each

=== Losing quarterfinalists ===
- Prize money: R 400,000
- Participation fee: R 250,000
- Total: R 650,000 for 4 teams each

=== Losing Semi-Finalists ===
- Prize money: R 750,000
- Participation fee: R 250,000
- Total: R 1,000,000 for 2 teams each

=== Final – runner up ===
- Prize money: R 1,500,000
- Participation fee: R 250,000
- Total: R 1,750,000

=== Final – winner ===
- Prize money: R 4,000,000
- Participation fee: R 250,000
- Total: R 4,250,000

=== ‘'Total prize money'’ ===
- Total prize money: R 10,200,000
- Total participation fee: R 4,000,000
- Grand total: R 14,200,000

== Results ==
=== Bracket ===
Round of 16
Bidvest Wits	3
Kaizer Chiefs	2
Free State Stars	3
Golden Arrows	1
Chippa United	1
Bloemfontein Celtic	2
Black Leopards	0
Orlando Pirates	2
Maritzburg United	0(4)
Moroka Swallows	0(3)
Ajax Cape Town	1(3)
Supersport United	1(4)
AmaZulu	2
Platinum Stars	1
Mamelodi Sundowns	1
University of Pretoria	0

Quarter-Finals
Bidvest Wits	0(3)
Free State Stars	0(4)
Bloemfontein Celtic	3(5)
Orlando Pirates	3(3)
Maritzburg United	0
Supersport United	2
AmaZulu	0
Mamelodi Sundowns	2

Semi-Finals
Free State Stars	2
Bloemfontein Celtic	3
Supersport United	0
Mamelodi Sundowns	1

Final
Bloemfontein Celtic	1
Mamelodi Sundowns	0

=== First round ===
The draw for the first round was done on 9 October 2012.
The first round matches took place from 19–23 October.

19 October 2012	Bidvest Wits	3–2	Kaizer Chiefs	Bidvest Stadium, Braampark
20:15	M. Pattison 11'; P. Faty 17'; L. Koapeng 70'	Report	B. Parker 64'; L. Majoro 72'	Attendance: 5,000

20 October 2012	Free State Stars	3–1	Golden Arrows	Goble Park, Bethlehem
15:00	K. Mashego 30'; M. Mvula 41'; L. Nomandela 49'	Report	47' B. Ntuli	Attendance: 3,000

20 October 2012	Ajax Cape Town	1–1 (a.e.t.) (3–4 p)	Supersport United	Athlone Stadium, Cape Town
15:00	B. Grobler 52'	Report	77' T. September	Attendance: 500
	Penalties
	T. Hlatshwayo (penalty scored); C. Lolo (penalty missed); B. Grobler (penalty missed); L. Manyama (penalty scored); K. Billiat (penalty scored)		(penalty missed) K. Erasmus; (penalty scored) S. Zuma; (penalty scored) M. Haskins; (penalty scored) T. September; (penalty scored) M. Khenyeza

20 October 2012	Black Leopards	0–2	Orlando Pirates	Peter Mokaba Stadium, Polokwane
20:15	(red card) 39' Thulani Ntshingila	Report	5' C. Mbesuma; 79' C. Mbesuma	Attendance: 3,000

20 October 2012	Maritzburg United	0–0 (a.e.t.) (4–3 p)	Moroka Swallows	Harry Gwala Stadium, Pietermaritzburg
20:15		Report		Attendance: 2,500
	Penalties
	D. Buckley (penalty scored); B. Hendricks (penalty scored); M. Awal (penalty missed); F. Sarfo Gyamfi (penalty scored); M. Booysen (penalty scored)		(penalty scored) M. Maleka; (penalty scored) D. Mabalane; (penalty missed) F. Obada; (penalty scored) G. Nergadze; (penalty missed) L. Mungomeni

21 October 2012	Chippa United	1–2	Bloemfontein Celtic	Philippi Stadium, Cape Town
15:00	B. Sali 59'	Report	79' D. Isaacs; 83' J. Motshegwa	Attendance: 2,000

21 October 2012	AmaZulu	2–1	Platinum Stars	Sugar Ray Xulu Stadium, Durban
15:00	E. Mkhabela 75' (o.g.); 90+1' A. Dlamini	Report	51' T. Phala	Attendance: 2,000

23 October 2012	Mamelodi Sundowns	1–0	University of Pretoria	Loftus Versfeld Stadium, Pretoria
19:30	A. Laffor 47'	Report		Attendance: 6,000

=== Quarter-finals ===
The draw for the quarterfinal was done at Loftus Stadium in Pretoria on Tuesday 23 October 2012.
The quarter-finals took place on 2, 3 and 4 November 2012.

2 November 2012	Maritzburg United	0–2	Supersport United	Harry Gwala Stadium, Pietermaritzburg
20:00		Report	71' T. Nkoana; 76' S. Zuma	Attendance: 6,000

3 November 2012	AmaZulu	0–2	Mamelodi Sundowns	King Zwelithini Stadium, Umlazi
15:00	C. Nyadombo (yellow card) 40' (yellow-red card) 76'	Report	51' E. Rodgers; 83' T. Modise	Attendance: 20,000

3 November 2012	Bidvest Wits	0–0 (a.e.t.) (3–4 p)	Free State Stars	Bidvest Stadium, Braampark
20:00		Report		Attendance: 3,000
	Penalties
	S. Vilakazi (penalty scored); T. Sweswe (penalty scored); P. Faty (penalty missed); C. Kadi (penalty scored); T. Fanteni (penalty missed)		(penalty scored) K. Mweene; (penalty scored) K. Mashego; (penalty scored) S. Ouro-Akoriko; (penalty missed) N. Chivuta; (penalty scored) L. Nomandela

4 November 2012	Bloemfontein Celtic	3–3 (a.e.t.) (5–3 p)	Orlando Pirates	Free State Stadium, Bloemfontein
15:00	L. Becela 54' (pen.); R. Gamildien 88'; J. Mogorosi 90+4'	Report	22' D. Klate; 49' O. Manyisa; 56' T. Matlaba	Attendance: 38,234
	Penalties
	L. Bacela (penalty scored); L. Manzine (penalty scored); J. Motshega (penalty scored); J. Mogorosi (penalty scored); D. Isaacs (penalty scored)		(penalty scored) A. Jali; (penalty missed) O. Manyisa; (penalty scored) S. Sangweni; (penalty scored) P. Phungwayo

=== Semi-finals ===
The draw for the Semi-Finals took place on Monday 5 November 2012.
The semi-finals took take place on 17 and 18 November 2012.

17 November 2012	Supersport United	0–1	Mamelodi Sundowns	Peter Mokaba Stadium
20:15		Report	16' E. Rodgers	Attendance: 5,000

18 November 2012	Free State Stars	2–3 (a.e.t.)	Bloemfontein Celtic	Charles Mopeli Stadium
15:00	D. Wome 70', 83'	Report	51' L. Madubanya; 80' L. Manzine; 95' J. Mogorosi	Attendance: 15,000

=== Final ===
1 December 2012	Mamelodi Sundowns	0–1	Bloemfontein Celtic	Moses Mabhida Stadium, Durban
20:15		Report	47' J. Mogorosi	Attendance: 20,000

== See also ==
- Telkom Knockout
- South African Football Association
