= Moeketsi Sekola =

South African soccer player

Personal information
- Date of birth: 27 January 1989 (age 37)
- Position: Forward

Senior career*
Years	Team	Apps	(Gls)
–2013	Roses United	16+	(0+)
2013–2017	Free State Stars	87	(20)
2017	Chippa United	13	(2)
2018–2019	Highlands Park	26	(7)
2019–2020	Real Kings	13	(5)
2020–2021	Jomo Cosmos	30	(10)
2021–2022	Free State Stars	30	(11)
2022–2023	Tshakhuma Tsha Madzivhandila	15	(5)
2023–2024	Venda F.C.	18	(3)
- * Club domestic league appearances and goals

Moeketsi Sekola (born 27 January 1989) is a South African professional soccer player who plays as a forward.

== Career ==
Sekola started his career with South African third division side Roses United, helping them earn promotion to the South African second division. In 2013, Sekola signed for Free State Stars in the South African top flight, where he made 101 appearances and scored 21 goals. He was the top scorer of the 2014–15 South African Premier Division with 14 goals. Before the second half of 2017/18, Sekola signed for South African second division club Highlands Park, helping them earn promotion to the South African top flight.
