= Semenya =

Semenya is a surname. Notable people with the surname include:

- Caiphus Semenya (born 1939), South African composer and musician
- Caster Semenya (born 1991), South African middle-distance runner
- Lesego Semenya (1982–2021), South African chef
- Thabiso Semenya (born 1982), South African soccer player

== See also ==
- Semenyo
