= Ryan Rae =

South African soccer player

Personal information
- Full name: Ryan George Christopher Rae
- Date of birth: 21 August 1991 (age 35)
- Place of birth: Johannesburg, South Africa
- Position: Midfielder

Senior career*
| Years | Team | Apps | (Gls) |
| 2014–2020 | Highlands Park | 72 | (2) |
| 2020–2021 | Chippa United | 6 | (0) |
| 2021–2022 | Maritzburg United | 33 | (0) |
- * Club domestic league appearances and goals as of 30 October 2022

Ryan George Christopher Rae (born 21 August 1991) is a South African soccer player who last played as a midfielder for South African Premier Division side Maritzburg United.

== Club career ==
In October 2020, he joined Chippa United on a three-year deal. He left Chippa United in February 2021 after 7 appearances for the club (league and cup) and subsequently signed for Maritzburg United.
