= Rosslee =

Rosslee is a surname. Notable people with the surname include:

- Craig Rosslee (born 1970), South African footballer and manager
- Matthew Rosslee (born 1987), South African rugby union player
