= Andre Arendse =

South African footballer (born 1967)

Personal information
- Full name: Andre Leander Arendse
- Date of birth: 27 June 1967 (age 59)
- Place of birth: Cape Town, South Africa
- Height: 1.91 m (6 ft 3 in)
- Position: Goalkeeper

Youth career
- Vasco Da Gama

Senior career*
Years	Team	Apps	(Gls)
1991–1998	Cape Town Spurs	187	(0)
1992	→ Santos (loan)	38	(0)
1998–2000	Fulham	12	(0)
2000	Oxford United	11	(0)
2000–2003	Santos	101	(0)
2003–2005	Mamelodi Sundowns	45	(0)
2005–2009	Supersport United	40	(0)
2013	Bidvest Wits	2	(0)
Total		436	(0)

International career^{‡}
1995–2004	South Africa	67	(0)
- * Club domestic league appearances and goals as of 13 June 2013 ‡ National team caps and goals as of 13 June 2013

Andre Leander Arendse (born 27 June 1967) is a South African former soccer player who played as a goalkeeper.

He represented South Africa 67 times having made his debut in 1995. He was initially in the 1998 FIFA World Cup squad, but had to pull out due to injury. His replacement Paul Evans also withdrew through injury and was replaced by Simon Gopane. He was South Africa's first-choice goalkeeper at the 2002 FIFA World Cup, and retired from international football in 2004. He was also the starting goalkeeper for the South Africa team that won the 1996 African Cup of Nations.

== Club career ==
Arendse made his debut in 1991 for Cape Town Spurs in the now defunct NSL, being loaned to Cape Town side Santos in 1992. He later played professionally for Oxford United, Fulham (both England), Santos, Mamelodi Sundowns and SuperSport United.

He retired from football in 2009 winning the Premier Soccer League title with SuperSport United. In May 2013, Arendse returned as an emergency goalkeeper for Bidvest Wits due to injuries to the club's goalkeepers Steven Hoffman, Jackson Mabokgwane, Emile Baron and Ryan Harrison. This made him the oldest player in PSL history surpassing the previous record set by Bruce Grobbelaar.

== International Career ==
Arendse was called up to the South African national team on several occasions before making his international debut on 22 November 1995, coming on as a substitute for Steve Crowley in a 2–2 draw against Zambia. Initially a second-choice goalkeeper under Clive Barker, he was behind Crowley in the pecking order. However, shortly before the 1996 African Cup of Nations, Barker dropped Crowley and selected Arendse as the first-choice goalkeeper ahead of Roger de Sa and John Tlale, despite Arendse having only four international caps.

Arendse started South Africa's opening match of the 1996 African Cup of Nations against Cameroon, keeping a clean sheet in a 3–0 victory. He retained his place for the remainder of the tournament and played in all six matches as South Africa won the competition on home soil. He conceded only two goals during the tournament, against Egypt in the group stage and Algeria in the quarter-finals, while keeping clean sheets against Cameroon, Angola and Ghana en route to the final. In the final, Arendse kept another clean sheet as South Africa defeated Tunisia 2–0 to win their first African title.

Following the tournament, Arendse's performances brought him wider international recognition. In January 1997, he was selected for an African XI that faced a European XI. Six months later, he became the second South African player after Mark Fish to be selected for a World XI, representing the side against an Asia XI in Hong Kong during celebrations marking Hong Kong's reunification with China.

Arendse continued as South Africa's first-choice goalkeeper during the 1998 FIFA World Cup qualifiers, where he conceded only three goals and set a national record with 693 minutes without conceding as South Africa qualified for the finals in France.

Arendse made his second appearance at a major international tournament at the 1997 FIFA Confederations Cup in Saudi Arabia. He started South Africa's opening two group matches, a 2–2 draw against the Czech Republic and a 1–0 defeat to the United Arab Emirates, before being rested for the final group match against Uruguay. South Africa lost 4–3 and were eliminated from the competition.

The following year, Arendse was ruled out of the 1998 FIFA World Cup in France after suffering a knee ligament injury shortly before the tournament. He had been included in South Africa's plans but was replaced by Paul Evans, who subsequently suffered an injury of his own. Simon Gopane was then called up as a replacement. Arendse's absence meant that he missed South Africa's first World Cup appearance.

Following the World Cup, his international career was affected by his lack of regular football at Fulham and the emergence of Hans Vonk as a leading contender for the national-team goalkeeper position. Arendse did not make an appearance for South Africa during 1998 and was also absent throughout the 2000 African Cup of Nations qualification campaign.

He regained the starting position ahead of the 2000 African Cup of Nations and was included in Trott Moloto's squad for the tournament. He started South Africa's first two group matches and their knockout matches, but was rested for the final group game against Algeria, when Hans Vonk started. South Africa defeated Ghana 1–0 in the quarter-finals to reach the semi-finals for the third consecutive tournament. They faced Nigeria in the semi-final, where Tijani Babangida scored twice in a 2–0 defeat. South Africa subsequently faced Tunisia in the third-place play-off, with Arendse making a costly error when his mis-kick from a back-pass allowed Ali Zitouni to equalise. He later saved a penalty from Khaled Badra, but Tunisia scored a late equaliser to force a 2–2 draw. South Africa won the subsequent penalty shoot-out 4–3 to finish third.

Arendse also featured prominently during South Africa's qualification for the 2002 African Cup of Nations, appearing in five qualification matches. However, he was relegated to the bench at the finals in Mali, with Vonk preferred as the starting goalkeeper. He remained in contention for the 2002 FIFA World Cup and regained the starting position following a strong domestic season with Santos.

Arendse was selected for the World Cup in South Korea and Japan and was the oldest member of the South African squad. On 23 May 2002, shortly before the tournament, he made his 50th international appearance in a 2–0 defeat to Turkey in South Africa's final warm-up match, becoming the first South African goalkeeper to reach the milestone.

Arendse started South Africa's opening World Cup match against Paraguay, making his tournament debut at the age of 34. He retained his place for the second group match against Slovenia and kept a clean sheet as South Africa won 1–0, recording the country's first World Cup victory and making him the first South African goalkeeper to keep a clean sheet at the tournament. South Africa therefore entered their final group match against Spain needing only a draw to progress to the knockout stage. In the final group match against Spain, Arendse gifted Raúl the opening goal after the ball slipped from his grasp as he attempted to collect a pass from midfield. South Africa twice fought back to equalise but lost 3–2, with Raúl scoring the decisive goal. Paraguay's victory over Slovenia subsequently eliminated South Africa on goals scored.

After the World Cup, Arendse was given an opportunity to captain the national team on several occasions under Ephraim Mashaba. He subsequently captained South Africa during the 2002 COSAFA Cup, where the team won the competition for the first time after defeating Malawi over two legs in the final. Although Arendse continued to captain South Africa in a number of matches, Mashaba eventually settled on Mbulelo Mabizela as the team's longer-term captain.

After helping South Africa qualify for the 2004 African Cup of Nations, Arendse lost his starting place to Emile Baron, but was selected for his fourth African Cup of Nations squad, becoming one of the first South African players to reach the milestone alongside John Moshoeu. His sole appearance in the tournament came in the final group game against Morocco on 4 February 2004, replacing the injured Baron in the starting lineup. The match ended in a 1–1 draw, with Patrick Mayo scoring for South Africa, and marked his 67th and final international appearance. At the time, he was South Africa's third–most capped player of all time, behind Lucas Radebe and John Moshoeu. The result eliminated South Africa in the group stage for the first time in the country's history.

== Coaching career ==
Arendse took over as interim coach of Supersport United in April 2022. However, the club appointed Gavin Hunt to the permanent position, with Arendse remaining as assistant, stating that Arendse didn't have the requisite coaching qualifications should the club qualify for continental competition.
