= Wandisile Letlabika =

South African footballer

Personal information
- Date of birth: 2 August 1989 (age 37)
- Place of birth: Aliwal North, South Africa
- Height: 1.80 m (5 ft 11 in)
- Position: Centre back

Team information
- Current team: Moroka Swallows
- Number: 5

Senior career*
Years	Team	Apps	(Gls)
2010–2011	Als Puk Tawana		
2011–2013	Mamelodi Sundowns	3	(0)
2013–2020	Bloemfontein Celtic	116	(0)
2020–	Moroka Swallows	61	(2)

International career^{‡}
2015	South Africa	4	(1)
- * Club domestic league appearances and goals as of 15 June 2024 ‡ National team caps and goals as of 13 November 2022

Wandisile Letlabika (born 2 August 1989) is a South African professional soccer player who plays for Moroka Swallows in the South African Premier Division.

== Honours ==
Mamelodi Sundowns

Runner-up

- Nedbank Cup: 2012–13
- Telkom Knockout: 2012

Bloemfontein Celtic

Runner-up

- Nedbank Cup: 2019–20
- Telkom Knockout: 2017
