= Simon Gopane =

South African soccer player and coach

Personal information
- Full name: Motshweneng Simon Gopane
- Date of birth: 26 December 1970 (age 55)
- Place of birth: Bloemfontein, South Africa
- Height: 1.73 m (5 ft 8 in)
- Position: Goalkeeper

Senior career*
Years	Team	Apps	(Gls)
1990–1999	Bloemfontein Celtic	204	(0)
1999–2000	Jomo Cosmos	29	(0)
2000–2001	Umtata Bush Bucks	25	(0)
2001–2003	Mamelodi Sundowns	0	(0)
2003–2008	Bloemfontein Celtic	27	(0)

International career
1998	South Africa	1	(0)

Managerial career
- 2010: Bloemfontein Celtic (GK coach)
- 2014: Roses United
- * Club domestic league appearances and goals

Motshweneng Simon Gopane (born 26 December 1970) is a South African football coach and a former player. A goalkeeper, he played for Bloemfontein Celtic, Jomo Cosmos, Umtata Bush Bucks and Mamelodi Sundowns while also representing South Africa in the 1998 African Cup of Nations and 1998 FIFA World Cup. Since retiring he moved into goalkeeper coaching and returned to his local team Bloemfontein Celtic before having a brief spell as the Head coach for Roses United.

== International career ==
Gopane was called up to the South Africa national team squad for the 1998 African Cup of Nations held in Burkina Faso as an uncapped player leading up to the tournament. He went on to make his debut within the event on 16 February 1998 in a group game against Namibia, which South Africa won 4–1.

He was in the South African national team for the 1998 FIFA World Cup as an injury replacement. Andre Arendse was injured before the start of the tournament. His replacement, Paul Evans, was also injured shortly after arriving as a replacement. Gopane was then called up, and sat on the bench for the last two matches. He holds the distinctive position of being the first-ever goalkeeper to wear the number 23 for his country in the FIFA World Cup.
