= Ian Palmer (soccer, born 1966) =

South African soccer player and coach (1966–2021)

Personal information
- Full name: Ian Craig Palmer
- Date of birth: 9 March 1966
- Place of birth: Johannesburg, South Africa
- Date of death: 22 July 2021 (aged 55)
- Position: Striker

Senior career*
Years	Team	Apps	(Gls)
- PG Rangers
- Orlando Pirates

Managerial career
- Eldo Sporting
- Mabopane Young Masters
- 2004–2005: Manning Rangers
- 2006–2007: FC AK
- 2007–2008: Maritzburg United
- 2009: African Warriors
- 2009–2010: United FC
- 2010–2011: Blackburn Rovers
- 2011–2012: Maritzburg United
- 2012: Black Leopards
- 2013: Santos
- 2013–2014: Chippa United
- –2016: Milano United
- * Club domestic league appearances and goals

Ian Craig Palmer (9 March 1966 – 22 July 2021) was a South African football coach.

== Biography ==
Palmer was born in Johannesburg, but came from Riverlea. He played as a striker for Orlando Pirates until his career was cut short by a kidney ailment. He later managed teams in both the Premier Soccer League and the National First Division, last the National First Division club Milano United.

He received a kidney transplant in 2016. He died on 22 July 2021 due to COVID-19 complications.
