= PSL Q-innovation =

Premier Soccer League schedule

The 2012–13 Premier Soccer League season (known as the ABSA Premiership for sponsorship reasons) saw the introduction of the Q-innovation system. The league schedule is split into four fixture-blocks referred to as quarters, the first and third blocks have eight fixtures, the second and fourth blocks have seven fixtures.

Prize money is given to the teams who finish top of the table after each block of fixtures.

== 2012-13 Q3 League table ==
Pos	Team	Pld	W	D	L	GF	GA	GD	Pts
1	Kaizer Chiefs	7	4	3	0	10	3	+7	15
2	Moroka Swallows	6	3	2	1	9	6	+3	11
3	Orlando Pirates	6	3	2	1	7	4	+3	11
4	Bidvest Wits	6	3	2	1	8	7	+1	11
5	AmaZulu	6	3	2	1	4	3	+1	11
6	Bloemfontein Celtic	6	2	3	1	8	6	+2	9
7	Free State Stars	6	2	2	2	7	5	+2	8
8	SuperSport United	5	2	2	1	4	3	+1	8
9	Platinum Stars	6	2	1	3	7	6	+1	7
10	Golden Arrows	6	2	1	3	5	6	−1	7
11	Mamelodi Sundowns	6	1	3	2	5	4	+1	6
12	Maritzburg United	6	1	2	3	4	8	−4	5
13	University of Pretoria	6	0	4	2	4	7	−3	4
14	Chippa United	6	1	1	4	5	10	−5	4
15	Black Leopards	6	1	1	4	5	12	−7	4
16	Ajax Cape Town	5	0	3	2	4	8	−4	3

Updated to match(es) played on 10/03/2013. Source: http://www.psl.co.za/results.asp?id=794
Rules for classification: 1) points; 2) goal difference; 3) number of goals scored.
