= Vladislav Herić =

Serbian football manager (born 1966)

Personal information
- Date of birth: 29 August 1966 (age 60)
- Place of birth: Novi Sad, SR Serbia, SFR Yugoslavia

Managerial career
- Years: Team
- 2005–2007: Club Africain
- 2007–2008: Maritzburg United
- 2008: Bay United
- 2009–2010: Black Leopards
- 2010–2011: African Warriors
- 2011–2012: Black Leopards
- 2012: Polokwane City
- 2013: FC Cape Town
- 2014: Chippa United
- 2015: Royal Eagles
- 2015–2017: Ajax Cape Town (assistant)
- 2015–2017: Ajax Cape Town (youth coach)
- 2017: Cape Town All Stars
- 2018: Chippa United
- 2018–2019: Ubuntu Cape Town
- 2019: Free State Stars
- 2020–2021: Cape Town Spurs
- 2021: Chippa United

Vladislav Herić (Serbian Cyrillic: Владислав Херић born 29 August 1966) is a Serbian professional football manager.

He has spent most of his coaching career with clubs in South Africa and has established himself as one of the country's best football coaches, by winning 2 promotions and surviving 9 relegations.

== Early life ==
He was born in Novi Sad in Yugoslavia, present-day Serbia.

His playing career begun in 1976 with FK Vojvodina's academy and he played professional football for FK Proleter Novi Sad and FK Fruskogorac Novi Sad. Due to an injury, he had to retire from playing at just 21 years of age.

== Education ==
Heric has a Senior Football Coaching Degree from University of Novi Sad. He also holds a UEFA 'A' license.

== Career ==
=== Bay United F.C. ===
Parted ways with Bay United F.C. after 4 losses, 4 wins, 2 draws and one tie.

=== Chippa United ===
He first came to prominence as a manager in the 2013-14 National First Division, winning it with four games to spare.

=== Ajax Cape Town Youth ===
Not long before December 2015, multiple sources disseminated information about his possible move to Ajax Cape Town F.C. which he did move to in December as team overseer. The coach almost went back to Polokwane City F.C. but Polokwane City F.C. and Royal Eagles F.C. failed to agree terms on compensation. Influenced by Roger De Sa to coach the team he claimed that was why he took up the Ajax Cape Town Youth job as well as his family already residing in Cape Town.

Touring the Netherlands to compete in two invitational tournaments under coach Vladislav in May 2016, he led his team to an 11th-place finish at the . Took pride in the national recognition of four players from the Ajax Cape Town Youth who made the latest South Africa U-20. Got called up as assistant coach in an encounter between Ajax and Maritzburg United F.C. in November 2016 since regular assistant Mich d'Avray was unavailable.

Under his coaching, Ajax sent three players to Europe - Tashreeq Mathews joined Borussia Dortmund, while Leo Thetani and Dean Solomons joined AFC Ajax
