= Azola Ntsabo =

South African soccer player

Personal information
- Date of birth: 25 February 1999 (age 27)
- Height: 1.81 m (5 ft 11 in)
- Position: Defender

Team information
- Current team: Chippa United
- Number: 3

Youth career
- Ajax Cape Town

Senior career*
| Years | Team | Apps | (Gls) |
| –2020 | Young Ajax | 0 | (0) |
| 2020–2022 | Cape Town All Stars | 29 | (0) |
| 2022– | Chippa United | 46 | (1) |
- * Club domestic league appearances and goals as of 4 January 2026

Azola Ntsabo (born 25 February 1999) is a South African soccer player who plays as a defender for Chippa United in the South African Premier Division.

Ntsabo was a part of the academy of Ajax Cape Town, and played senior football for Young Ajax in the 2019–20 SAFA Second Division. From 2020 to 2022, Ntsabo played for Cape Town All Stars in the First Division.

With Ntsabo, All Stars reached the playoffs to the Premier Division, but did not succeed. He was signed by Premier Division Chippa United in the summer of 2022, alongside two teammates, Brooklyn Poggenpoel and Sirgio Kammies. He made his first-tier debut in the 2022–23 South African Premier Division.

Ntsabo established himself as a Chippa United starter in the 2023–24 season. However, after featuring in a cup game in October, Ntsabo seemed to disappear from the squad.The downtime was said to be caused by a "medical condition". His contract would expire in the summer of 2024, and while Ntsabo was initially released together with fifteen other players, he was re-signed by Chippa United in July 2024.
