= April Phumo =

South African footballer (1937–2011)

Personal information
- Date of birth: 1 April 1937
- Place of birth: Johannesburg, South Africa
- Date of death: 27 November 2011 (aged 74)
- Place of death: Bloemfontein, South Africa

International career
Years	Team	Apps	(Gls)
- South Africa

Managerial career
- 1979–1995: Lesotho
- Arsenal
- Bloemfontein Celtic
- 2001–2002: Ria Stars
- South Africa U20
- South Africa U23
- South Africa women
- 2004: South Africa
- Nathi Lions
- 2009: United FC
- 2011: Atlie

April Phumo (1 April 1937 – 27 November 2011) was a South African football player and coach. He was nicknamed "Styles".

== Early life ==
April Phumo was born in Johannesburg on 1 April 1937.

== Playing career ==
He was a squad member of the South African national team prior to the 1966 FIFA World Cup; the team was banned from competing due to apartheid.

== Coaching career ==
=== Club sides ===
Phumo managed Arsenal (Maseru) of Lesotho, leading them to "several league titles and an unexpected place in the last 16 of the African Champions Cup in 1990." He later managed South African club sides Ria Stars, Bloemfontein Celtic, Nathi Lions and Atlie.

Phumo spent a brief spell as manager of United FC during 2009, helping the club gain promotion to South Africa's National First Division.

=== National sides ===
Phumo was the first ever manager of the Lesotho national team. Phumo began coaching Lesotho in 1979 and received a FIFA coaching diploma in 1981.

Phumo was involved with the South African men's senior team for a number of years. He was assistant to Trott Moloto and the 2000 African Cup of Nations, before a spell with Ria Stars.

In July 2002, Phumo returned as national team assistant to Ephraim Mashaba. When Mashaba was sacked in January 2004, Phumo became temporary manager, taking control of the national team at the 2004 African Cup of Nations. Phumo also managed the South African men's under-20, men's under-23 and women's senior national teams.

== Death ==
Phumo died of cancer on 27 November 2011, aged 74, at a hospital in Bloemfontein.
