= 2013–14 National First Division =

National First Division
- Season: 2013–14
- Champions: Chippa United
- Promoted: Chippa United
- Relegated: Roses United; Blackburn Rovers
- Matches: 240
- Goals: 595 (2.48 per match)
- Average goals/game: 2.47 per match
- Top goalscorer: David Zulu (16)

The 2013–14 National First Division was played from September 2013 until May 2014, and is the second tier of South Africa's professional football. Chippa United won the league, earning promotion to the 2014–15 Premiership. Black Leopards and Milano United finished second and third, thus qualifying for the promotion/relegation play-offs against Polokwane City, which had finished 15th in the Premiership. Polokwane City won the play-off, retaining the Premiership place. Roses United and Blackburn Rovers were relegated to the ABC Motsepe League following their 15th and 16th-place finishes.

== League table ==
Pos	Team	Pld	W	D	L	GF	GA	GD	Pts	Promotion or relegation
1	Chippa United (C, P)	30	17	7	6	54	36	+18	58	Promotion to 2014–15 South African Premiership
2	Black Leopards	30	14	8	8	53	37	+16	50	Qualification to 2013–14 PSL Playoff Tournament
3	Milano United	30	14	8	8	41	26	+15	50	Qualification to 2013–14 PSL Playoff Tournament
4	Baroka	30	14	8	8	45	33	+12	50	
5	Santos	30	11	14	5	34	25	+9	47	
6	Jomo Cosmos	30	12	10	8	32	25	+7	46	
7	United FC	30	11	10	9	44	30	+14	43	
8	African Warriors	30	12	6	12	43	41	+2	42	
9	Vasco da Gama	30	11	8	11	33	36	−3	41	
10	Witbank Spurs	30	10	9	11	33	40	−7	39	
11	Thanda Royal Zulu	30	9	11	10	33	41	−8	38	
12	FC Cape Town	30	8	11	11	35	41	−6	35	
13	Sivutsa Stars	30	7	13	10	28	36	−8	34	
14	Maluti FET College	30	6	12	12	44	59	−15	30	
15	Roses United (R)	30	4	11	15	22	42	−20	23	Relegation to SAFA Second Division
16	Blackburn Rovers (R)	30	4	6	20	22	48	−26	18	Relegation to SAFA Second Division

Source: https://thenfd.co.za/archive/201314/201314-log
(C) Champions; (P) Promoted; (R) Relegated

== Promotion play-offs ==
Pos	Lge	Team	Pld	W	D	L	GF	GA	GD	Pts	Qualification
1	PRE	Polokwane City	4	3	1	0	5	1	+4	10	Qualification for 2014–15 South African Premier Division
2	NFD	Black Leopards	4	2	0	2	4	4	0	6	
3	NFD	Milano United	4	0	1	3	1	5	−4	1	

Source: RSSSF
Rules for classification: 1) Points; 2) Goal difference; 3) Number of goals scored;

National First Division promotion play-off results
Date	Team 1	Result F–A	Team 2
14 May	Milano United	0–0	Polokwane City
18 May	Black Leopards	2–1	Milano United
21 May	Polokwane City	1–0	Black Leopards
25 May	Polokwane City	2–0	Milano United
28 May	Milano United	0–1	Black Leopards
1 Jun	Black Leopards	1–2	Polokwane City
