= 2014–15 South African Premiership =

South African Premiership
- Season: 2014–15
- Champions: Kaizer Chiefs
- Relegated: AmaZulu
- Champions League: Kaizer Chiefs; Mamelodi Sundowns
- Confederation Cup: Ajax Cape Town; Bidvest Wits University
- Matches: 240
- Goals: 555 (2.31 per match)
- Top goalscorer: Moeketsi Sekola (14)
- Biggest home win: Sundowns 5–0 Polokwane City (11 March 2015)
- Biggest away win: Sundowns 0–5 Bloem Celtic (15 April 2014)
- Highest scoring: Supersort 2–5 AmaZulu (1 March 2015)
- Longest winning run: 8 games Kaizer Chiefs
- Longest unbeaten run: 19 games Kaizer Chiefs
- Longest winless run: 12 games AmaZulu
- Longest losing run: 4 games Polokwane City; Moroka Swallows
- Highest attendance: 88,000; Kaizer Chiefs 0–2 Orlando Pirates (6 December 2014)
- Lowest attendance: 100; Moroka Swallows 2–1 AmaZulu (13 August 2014)
- Average attendance: 6,499
- All statistics correct as of 24 April 2015.

The 2014–15 South African Premiership season (known as the ABSA Premiership for sponsorship reasons) was the nineteenth season of the Premiership since its establishment in 1996. Fixtures were announced 5 June 2014. The league opened on 8 August 2014 and will conclude on 9 May 2015.

Mamelodi Sundowns were the defending champions, having won the previous 2013–14 South African Premier Division season. Chippa United earned their second promotion to the top-tier league after winning the 2013-14 National First Division. Polokwane City remained in the league after beating Black Leopards and Milano United in the Playoff Tournament.

== Teams ==
=== Stadiums and locations ===
Location of teams in the 2014–15 Premiership.

Football teams in South Africa tend to use multiple stadiums over the course of a season for their home games. The following table will only indicate the stadium used most often by the club for their home games

Team	Province	Home venue	Capacity
Ajax Cape Town	Western Cape	Cape Town Stadium	55,000
AmaZulu	Kwazulu-Natal	Moses Mabhida Stadium	54,000
Bidvest Wits	Gauteng	Bidvest Stadium	5,000
Bloemfontein Celtic	Free State	Seisa Ramabodu Stadium	20,000
Chippa United	Eastern Cape	Nelson Mandela Bay Stadium	49,000
Free State Stars	Free State	Charles Mopeli Stadium	35,000
Kaizer Chiefs	Gauteng	FNB Stadium (Soccer City)	94,700
Mamelodi Sundowns	Gauteng	Loftus Versfeld Stadium	52,000
Maritzburg United	Kwazulu-Natal	Harry Gwala Stadium	10,700
Moroka Swallows	Gauteng	Dobsonville Stadium	24,000
Mpumalanga Black Aces	Mpumalanga	Mbombela Stadium	40,900
Orlando Pirates	Gauteng	Orlando Stadium	36,400
Platinum Stars	North West	Royal Bafokeng Stadium	45,000
Polokwane City	Limpopo	Peter Mokaba Stadium	41,733
Supersport United	Gauteng	Lucas Moripe Stadium	28,900
Tuks FC	Gauteng	Tuks Stadium	8,000

=== Personnel and kits ===
Team	Manager	Supplier	Shirt sponsor
Ajax Cape Town	(South Africa) Roger De Sa	Adidas	Huawei
AmaZulu	(South Africa) Wilfred Mugeyi	Kappa	SPAR
Bidvest Wits	(South Africa) Gavin Hunt	Kappa	Bidvest
Polokwane City	(South Africa) Kosta Papic	XCO	Vacant
Bloemfontein Celtic	(Germany) Ernst Middendorp	Kappa	MTN
Free State Stars	(Belgium) Tom Saintfiet	Maxed	Bonitas
Chippa United	vacant	Nike	Chippa Holdings
Kaizer Chiefs	(England) Stuart Baxter	Nike	Vodacom
Mamelodi Sundowns	(South Africa) Pitso Mosimane	Nike	Ubuntu Botho
Maritzburg United	(South Africa) Steve Komphela	Umbro	Vacant
Moroka Swallows	(South Africa) Fani Madida (Interim)	Puma	Hyundai
Mpumalanga Black Aces	(South Africa) Clive Barker	Umbro	ISPS Handa
Orlando Pirates	(Serbia) Vladimir Vermezovic	Adidas	Vodacom
Platinum Stars	(South Africa) Allan Freese	Acelli	The Royal Marang Hotel
Supersport United	(South Africa) Gordon Igesund	Kappa	Engen Petroleum
Tuks FC	(South Africa) Steve Barker	Umbro	WorkersLife

== League table ==
Pos	Team	Pld	W	D	L	GF	GA	GD	Pts	Qualification or relegation
1	Kaizer Chiefs (C)	30	21	6	3	41	14	+27	69	Qualification for 2016 CAF Champions League
2	Mamelodi Sundowns	30	16	9	5	44	24	+20	57	Qualification for 2016 CAF Champions League
3	Bidvest Wits	30	15	7	8	34	25	+9	52	Qualification for 2016 CAF Confederation Cup
4	Orlando Pirates	30	13	11	6	46	29	+17	50	
5	Ajax Cape Town	30	12	8	10	34	35	−1	44	Qualification for 2016 CAF Confederation Cup
6	Supersport United	30	12	5	13	39	40	−1	41	
7	Bloemfontein Celtic	30	11	7	12	34	27	+7	40	
8	Maritzburg United	30	10	10	10	30	25	+5	40	
9	Free State Stars	30	10	8	12	34	39	−5	38	
10	Mpumalanga Black Aces	30	7	13	10	35	39	−4	34	
11	Platinum Stars	30	8	10	12	30	38	−8	34	
12	Polokwane City	30	9	7	14	42	60	−18	34	
13	University of Pretoria	30	7	11	12	28	32	−4	32	
14	Chippa United	30	7	9	14	23	37	−14	30	
15	Moroka Swallows (R)	30	8	6	16	30	47	−17	30	Qualification for the relegation play-offs
16	AmaZulu (R)	30	6	9	15	31	44	−13	27	Relegation to National First Division

Updated to match(es) played on 9 May 2015. Source: http://www.espnfc.com/south-african-premiership/2197/table
Rules for classification: 1) points; 2) goal difference; 3) number of goals scored.
(C) Champions; (R) Relegated

== Season statistics ==
=== Scoring ===
==== Top scorers ====
As of 24 October 2014

Rank	Player	Club	Goals
1	(South Africa) Moeketsi Sekola	Free State Stars	14
2	(South Africa) Lerato Trevor Lamola	Bloemfontein Celtic	13
3	(South Africa) Puleng Tlolane	Polokwane City	11
4	(South Africa) Kermit Erasmus	Orlando Pirates	10
4	(Zimbabwe) Cuthbert Malajila	Mamelodi Sundowns	10
6	(New Zealand) Jeremy Brockie	Supersport United	8
6	(South Africa) Ndumiso Mabena	Platinum Stars	8
6	(South Africa) Lehlohonolo Majoro	Orlando Pirates	8
9	(Zimbabwe) Khama Billiat	Mamelodi Sundowns	7
9	(South Africa) George Lebese	Kaizer Chiefs	7
9	(South Africa) Thabo Mnyamane	Pretoria University	7
9	(South Africa) Siyabonga Nomvethe	Moroka Swallows	7
9	(Malawi) Atusaye Nyondo	Pretoria University	7
9	(South Africa) Bernard Parker	Kaizer Chiefs	7
9	(South Africa) Eleazar Rodgers	Platinum Stars	7

=== Clean sheets ===
As of 28 September 2014

Rank	Player	Club	Clean sheets
1	(South Africa) Itumeleng Khune	Kaizer Chiefs	4
1	(Zambia) Kennedy Mweene	Mamelodi Sundowns	4

=== Discipline ===
==== Player ====
As of 24 April 2015

- Most yellow cards: 9
  - Luvhengo Mungomeni (Moroka Swallows)
- Most red cards: 2
  - Vuyisile Ntombayithethi (University of Pretoria)
  - Siyabonga Ngubane (University of Pretoria)

==== Club ====
As of 29 October 2014

- Most yellow cards: 20
  - Chippa United
  - Moroka Swallows
- Most red cards: 2
  - University of Pretoria
  - Platinum Stars
  - Ajax Cape Town
  - Kaizer Chiefs
  - Free State Stars

== Awards ==
=== Monthly awards ===
Month	ABSA Premiership Coach of the Month		ABSA Premiership Player of the Month		Reference
Month	Manager	Club	Player	Club	Reference
August	(England) Stuart Baxter	Kaizer Chiefs	(South Africa) Mandla Masango	Kaizer Chiefs	

Source: Premier Soccer League

== See also ==
- CAF 5 Year Ranking
