= Azola Matrose =

South African soccer player (born 2003)

Personal information
- Date of birth: 27 March 2003 (age 23)
- Place of birth: Walmer Township, Gqeberha
- Height: 1.80 m (5 ft 11 in)
- Position: Midfielder

Team information
- Current team: Chippa United
- Number: 10

Senior career*
Years	Team	Apps	(Gls)
2021–2022	Chippa United	14	(1)
2022–2024	Orlando Pirates	0	(0)
2022–2023	→ Chippa United (loan)	16	(2)
2024–	Chippa United	19	(1)

International career^{‡}
2022	South Africa	1	(0)
- * Club domestic league appearances and goals as of 4 January 2026 ‡ National team caps and goals as of 16 August 2024

Azola Matrose (born 27 March 2003) is a South African soccer player who plays as a midfielder for Chippa United in the Premier Soccer League.

He was born in Walmer. Matrose was signed by Chippa United as the autumn of 2021 approached, and made his first-tier debut in the 2021–22 South African Premier Division. He performed as well as to be called up to South Africa's squad for the 2022 COSAFA Cup, where he made his international debut against Madagascar.

He was signed by Orlando Pirates in 2022, but spent 2022–23 back on loan with Chippa United. One of the reasons was to complete Grade 11 of school.

Matrose missed the close of the 2022–23 season, and as the 2023–24 season approached, he still had an injured fibula. He was given match training for the reserve team in the Diski Challenge in early 2024. In August 2024, Matrose finally rejoined Chippa United permanently, signing a three-year deal.
