= Lantshene Phalane =

South African soccer player

Lantshane Phalane
Personal information
- Date of birth: 21 November 1989 (age 36)
- Place of birth: Ga-Rakgoatha, Zebediela. South Africa
- Position: Midfielder

Team information
- Current team: Baroka

Senior career*
Years	Team	Apps	(Gls)
2010–2011	Baroka		
2011–2014	Platinum Stars	2	(1)
2012–2013	→ Milano United (loan)	15	(0)
2013–2014	→ University of Pretoria (loan)	7	(0)
2014–2015	Moroka Swallows	25	(2)
2015–2021	Bloemfontein Celtic	119	(2)
2021–2023	Royal AM	34	(1)
2023–2024	Moroka Swallows	23	(0)
2024–	Baroka	3	(0)
- * Club domestic league appearances and goals as of 14 November 2024

Lantshane Phalane (born 21 November 1989) is a South African professional soccer player who plays as a midfielder for Baroka in the South African National First Division.
