= Walmer, Gqeberha =

Walmer
- Neighborhood
- Motto: "Festina Lente" (Latin: Make Haste Slowly)
- Walmer's location in Eastern Cape
- Coordinates: 33°58′33″S 25°35′9″E
- Country: South Africa
- Province: Eastern Cape
- Municipality: Nelson Mandela Bay
- Main Place: Gqeberha

Area
  - Total: 7.42 km^{2} (2.86 sq mi)

Population (2011)
  - Total: 6,792
  - Density: 915/km^{2} (2,370/sq mi)

Racial Makeup (2011)
  - White: 81.4%
  - Indian/Asian: 1.9%
  - Coloured: 2.5%
  - Black African: 12.6%
  - Other: 1.7%

First Languages (2011)
  - English: 72.9%
  - Afrikaans: 17.8%
  - Xhosa: 4.9%
  - Other: 1.8%

Walmer is a large neighborhood of Gqeberha, the largest city in Eastern Cape, South Africa.

== Geography ==
Walmer is located around 4 kilometres (2.5 mi) south of Gqeberha's city centre and is the location of the Port Elizabeth International Airport.

== History ==
It was an independent municipality from 1899 to 1965, when it was absorbed by Gqeberha. For unknown reasons, it was named after Walmer Castle, the seat of the Duke of Wellington in Kent, England.

== Notable people ==
Azola Matrose (Soccer Player)

== Sources ==
- Raper, Peter Edmund (2004). New Dictionary of South African Place Names. Johannesburg & Cape Town: Jonathan Ball Publishers. ISBN 1-86842-190-2
