= Benjamin Reed =

South African soccer player

Personal information
- Date of birth: 2 October 1961 (age 65)
- Place of birth: South Africa
- Position: Striker

Senior career*
| Years | Team | Apps | (Gls) |
| 1985–1993 | Bloemfontein Celtic | ? | (75) |

International career
| 1992 | South Africa | 1 | (0) |

Managerial career
- 2012–2013: Roses United
- * Club domestic league appearances and goals

Benjamin Reed (born 2 October 1961) is a South African former soccer player who played as a midfielder. He played for Bloemfontein Celtic his whole career. He is the all-time top goalscorer for Bloemfontein Celtic with 75 goals.
