= Samuel Julies =

South African soccer player

Personal information
- Full name: Samuel Amon Julies
- Date of birth: 4 July 1993 (age 33)
- Place of birth: Kimberley, South Africa
- Height: 1.69 m (5 ft 7 in)
- Position: Midfielder

Team information
- Current team: University of Pretoria
- Number: 35

Youth career
- Basotho Tigers
- School of Excellence
- Mamelodi Sundowns

Senior career*
Years	Team	Apps	(Gls)
2012–2017	Mamelodi Sundowns	9	(1)
2013–2015	→ Vasco Da Gama (loan)	53	(5)
2017–2018	Chippa United	6	(2)
2018–2019	Ajax Cape Town	19	(2)
2019–	University of Pretoria	110	(14)
- * Club domestic league appearances and goals as of 13 November 2022

Samuel Julies (born 4 July 1993) is a South African professional soccer player who plays as a midfielder for National First Division club University of Pretoria.

He spent two seasons on loan at National First Division club Vasco Da Gama.
