= Dan Malesela =

South African soccer coach

Personal information
- Date of birth: 27 June 1965 (age 61)
- Place of birth: South Africa
- Position: Defender

Senior career*
Years	Team	Apps	(Gls)
- Orlando Pirates

Managerial career
- 2012–2013: United FC
- 2015: Cape Town All Stars
- 2015–2017: Chippa United
- 2018: Chippa United
- 2018–2020: TS Galaxy
- 2020–2021: Chippa United
- 2022: Royal AM
- 2022–2023: Marumo Gallants
- 2023–2024: Baroka
- 2024–: Marumo Gallants
- * Club domestic league appearances and goals

Dan Malesela (born 27 June 1965) is a South African soccer coach and former player, who is the head coach of Marumo Gallants.

== Playing career ==
Malesela played as a defender. In 1988 he captained Orlando Pirates team which won the Nedbank Cup, beating Kaizer Chiefs in the final.

== Managerial career ==
In 2012, Malesela was appointed manager of South African second division side United FC.

In 2015, he was appointed manager of Chippa United in the South African top flight.

In 2018, he was appointed manager of South African second division club TS Galaxy, helping them win the 2018–19 Nedbank Cup with a 1–0 win over Kaizer Chiefs, one of the most successful teams in South Africa.

In 2020, Malesela returned to South African top flight outfit Chippa United.
