= Abbubaker Mobara =

South African soccer player

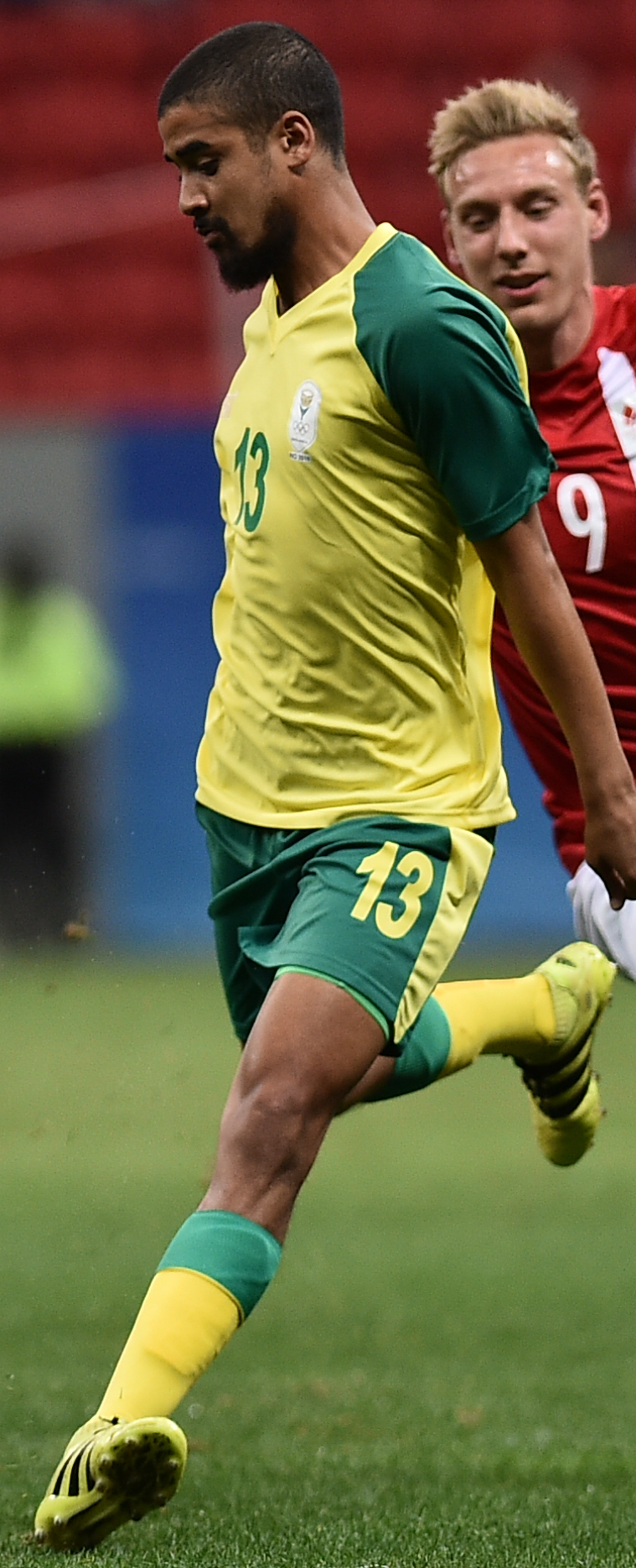

Personal information
- Full name: Abbubaker Mobara
- Date of birth: 18 February 1994 (age 32)
- Place of birth: Cape Town, South Africa
- Height: 1.79 m (5 ft 10 in)
- Positions: Defender; midfielder

Team information
- Current team: Chippa United
- Number: 2

Youth career
- Woodlands FC
- Ajax Cape Town

Senior career*
Years	Team	Apps	(Gls)
2013–2016	Ajax Cape Town	45	(2)
2016–2019	Orlando Pirates	39	(0)
2019–2022	Cape Town City	51	(1)
2022–2025	AmaZulu	44	(1)
2025-	Chippa United	24	(0)

International career^{‡}
2015	South Africa U23	5	(0)
2016–	South Africa	8	(0)
2016	South Africa Olympic	5	(0)
Medal record
COSAFA CUP 2016 Champions
- * Club domestic league appearances and goals as of 1 August 2024 ‡ National team caps and goals as of 27 January 2022

Abbubaker Mobara (born 18 February 1994) is a South African professional soccer player who plays as a defender and midfielder for Chippa United in the Premier Soccer League.

== Early life ==
Mobara, who hails from Mitchells Plain on the Cape Flats, started playing soccer at his school and was spotted by Ajax Cape Town scouts after scoring for his local club against them in a cup final.

== Early career ==
Mobara previously underwent trials with FC Twente, FC Porto, and RC Lens before returning to Ajax Cape Town. Mobara also spent time with AFC Ajax but was not signed.

== International career ==
He has caps at U17, U18 and U20 levels for South Africa.

== Honours ==
=== Individual ===
- 2016–17 Nedbank Cup player of the tournament

=== Club ===
Ajax Cape Town

- MTN 8: 2015

=== National ===
Bafana Bafana

- Cosafa cup: 2016
