= Zeca Marques =

Portuguese-South African football manager and former player

Personal information
- Full name: José Marques
- Date of birth: 16 August 1961 (age 65)
- Place of birth: Porto, Portugal
- Position: Midfielder

Senior career*
| Years | Team | Apps | (Gls) |
- Troyeville FC

Managerial career
- 2000: Moroka Swallows
- 2007–2008: Lusitano FC
- 2012–2014: Moroka Swallows
- 2015: Black Leopards
- 2015–2016: Santos
- 2019: Moroka Swallows
- 2021: TTM
- * Club domestic league appearances and goals

José "Zeca" Marques (born 16 August 1961) is a Portuguese South African football manager.

== Personal life ==
Born in Porto, Portugal, Marques and his family moved to Johannesburg during his childhood. In South Africa he has been nicknamed "Lollipop" due to him sucking on a lollipop during games.

== Playing career ==
He played for Troyeville FC in the defunct NSL and also in the NPSL.

== Coaching career ==
Marques has worked successfully as an assistant coach at Bidvest Wits and Moroka Swallows.

Marques had three stints at Moroka Swallows. In 2000 he was promoted to the Head Coach role and later in 2009 returned as an assistant coach. He was promoted to the head coaching role of Swallows in July 2012 following Gordon Igesund's appointment as Bafana Bafana coach, where he remained until 2014–15 season. He left Moroka Swallows to join Black Leopards FC where he guided them into the PSL Playoffs. Black Leopards became a force under his guidance at their home base in Thohoyandou. Probably one of his best results was the elimination of Kaizer Chiefs in the Nedbank Cup quarterfinals. He then joined Santos FC in 2015 before becoming the Technical Director at Balderstone Sports Institute.

== Achievements ==
- MTN 8 Cup winner: 2012/13
- Nedbank Cup winner: 2009/10
