= Luvuyo Memela =

South African footballer

Personal information
- Full name: Amigo Luvuyo Memela
- Date of birth: 18 September 1987 (age 39)
- Place of birth: Mbekweni, South Africa
- Height: 1.67 m (5 ft 6 in)
- Position: Winger

Youth career
- Mbekweni Cosmos
- Mbekweni United
- Ajax Cape Town

Senior career*
Years	Team	Apps	(Gls)
2010–2011	Hanover Park		
2011–	Chippa United		
2013–2015	Cape Town All Stars	27+	(15+)
2015–2020	Orlando Pirates	78	(10)
2020–2022	AmaZulu	52	(15)
2022–2023	Richards Bay	24	(1)
2023–2024	Chippa United	15	(0)

International career^{‡}
2015–2022	South Africa	4	(0)
- * Club domestic league appearances and goals as of 1 April 2024 ‡ National team caps and goals as of 1 April 2024

Luvuyo Memela (born 18 September 1987 in Cape Town) is a South African professional soccer player.

Memela made his international debut for South Africa in October 2015, playing home and away against Angola. In August 2022, he played during the 2022 African Nations Championship qualification, again facing Angola.

After being released from Chippa United in 2024, Memela found himself without a club. He claimed that South African soccer clubs were age discriminating.
