= Semenyo =

Semenyo is a surname. Notable people with the surname include:

- Antoine Semenyo (born 2000), Ghanaian footballer
- Jai Semenyo (born 2003), Ghanaian footballer, brother of Antoine

== See also ==
- Semenya
