= 2011–12 SAFA Second Division =

Vodacom League
- Season: 2011–12
- Champions: Roses United
- Promoted: Roses United, Milano United

The 2011–12 SAFA Second Division, known as the Vodacom League for sponsorship reasons, was the 2011–12 season of the third tier South African football league, the SAFA Second Division. It was divided into two streams, the Inland Stream and the Coastal Stream.

== Playoffs ==
The tournament, featuring the winners of each of the nine provincial divisions, will be divided into two groups.

=== Group A (Inland Stream) ===
Pos	Team	Pld	W	D	L	GF	GA	GD	Pts
1	Vardos F.C. (Gauteng)	0	-	-	-	-	-	—	0
2	Soshanguve Sunshine (North West)	0	-	-	-	-	-	—	0
3	Roses United F.C. (Free State)	0	-	-	-	-	-	—	0
4	Batau F.C. (Mpumalanga)	0	-	-	-	-	-	—	0
5	Baroka F.C. (Limpopo)	0	-	-	-	-	-	—	0

2 July 2012

Baroka FC	1-1	Maritzburg City

Seshego Stadium
2 July 2012

Baroka FC	1-1	Maritzburg City

Seshego Stadium
3 July 2012

Roses United F.C.	1-0	Vardos F.C.

3 July 2012

Vardos F.C.	v	Maritzburg City F.C.

4 July 2012

Batau F.C.	2-3	Soshanguve Sunshine F.C.

Roses United	2-0	Martizburg City

Batau	2-1	Tornado F.C.

=== Group B (Coastal Stream) ===
Club
Milano United F.C. (Western Cape)
Tornado FC
Morester Jeug (Northern Cape)
Maritzburg City F.C.(Kwazulu-Natal)

2 July 2012

Roses United	1-0	Vardos FC

3 July 2012

Tornado FC	v	Soshanguve Sunshine

3 July 2012

Roses United	v	Morester Jeug FC

4 July 2012

Maritzburg City	2-2	Morester Jeug

=== Playoff Final ===
8 July 2012

Roses United F.C.	0-0	Milano United F.C.
Penalties
	4-2

Seshego Stadium, Polokwane
