= Somila Ntsundwana =

South African soccer player

Personal information
- Date of birth: 26 November 1996 (age 29)
- Position: Forward

Team information
- Current team: Chippa United
- Number: 45

Youth career
- Bidvest Wits

Senior career*
| Years | Team | Apps | (Gls) |
| 2015–2017 | Bidvest Wits | 1 | (0) |
| 2017–2021 | AmaZulu | 19 | (1) |
| 2019–2020 | → Royal Eagles (loan) | 19 | (4) |
| 2021 | → Richards Bay (loan) | 18 | (3) |
| 2021–2025 | Richards Bay | 106 | (12) |
| 2025– | Chippa United | 4 | (0) |
- * Club domestic league appearances and goals as of 4 January 2026

Somila Ntsundwana (born 26 November 1996) is a South African soccer player who plays as a forward for Chippa United in the Premier Soccer League.

He hails from Motherwell, Eastern Cape. he came up though the academy of Bidvest Wits, and also made his Premier Division debut for Wits in December 2015. He has been nicknamed Balotelli.

Ahead of the 2017–18 season he joined AmaZulu. Ahead of the 2019–20 season, Ntsundwana was told by then-manager Cavin Johnson that he was not in his plans at AmaZulu, and was obligated to go on loan. Ntsundwana went to Royal Eagles, a step down to the second tier, but he did see more playing time. However, Royal Eagles disintegrated, and Ntsundwana was back with AmaZulu until he went on his second loan in January 2021, this time to Richards Bay.

Ahead of the 2021–22 season, Ntsundwana declined to return to AmaZulu and joined Richards Bay permanently. The club won promotion from the 2021–22 National First Division, with Ntsundwana being a regular in Richards Bay's subsequent stint in the Premier Division.
