= Tshepo Rikhotso =

South African soccer player

Personal information
- Full name: Mbhazima Tshepo Rikhotso
- Date of birth: 26 February 1993 (age 33)
- Place of birth: Ndengeza, South Africa
- Position: Centre-back

Team information
- Current team: Marumo Gallants
- Number: 3

Senior career*
Years	Team	Apps	(Gls)
2013–2014	Vasco De Gama	7	(0)
2014–2015	Roses United		
2015–2021	Bloemfontein Celtic	119	(3)
2021–2023	Royal AM	28	(1)
2023–2024	Sekhukhune United	6	(0)
2024–	Marumo Gallants	13	(0)

International career^{‡}
2015	South Africa U23	3	(0)
2016	South Africa	1	(0)
- * Club domestic league appearances and goals as of 4 January 2026 ‡ National team caps and goals as of 13 November 2022

Mbhazima Tshepo Rikhotso (born 26 February 1993) is a South African professional soccer player who plays as a centre-back for South African Premier Division side Marumo Gallants.

== Personal life ==
He is nicknamed 'the Giraffe'.

== Club career ==
Born in Ndengeza, Rikhotso played for Vasco De Gama and Roses United before joining Bloemfontein Celtic in early 2015. The club's licence was taken over by Royal AM. In the summer of 2023 he moved on to Sekhukhune United.

== International career ==
Having also played for South Africa at under-23 level, Rikhotso was part of the South Africa squad for 2016 COSAFA Cup, and appeared in a 1–1 draw with Lesotho on 18 June 2016.
