= Petrus Ngebo =

South African soccer player

Personal information
- Full name: Petrus Zwelinjane Ngebo
- Date of birth: 1 April 1984 (age 42)
- Place of birth: Koppies, South Africa
- Height: 1.80 m (5 ft 11 in)
- Position: Striker

Youth career
- Arsenal (South Africa)
- Phumeleng Brazil

Senior career*
Years	Team	Apps	(Gls)
–2006	Bloemfontein Young Tigers		
2006–2009	Bloemfontein Celtic	48	(14)
2009–2010	Supersport United	2	(0)
2010	Blackburn Rovers		
2011	Free State Stars	9	(1)
2011–2012	Blackburn Rovers		
2012–2014	Chippa United		
2014–2015	Royal Eagles	10	(2)
2015–2017	Mthatha Bucks	26	(11)
2017–2019	Highlands Park	16	(4)
2019–2020	TS Sporting	5	(0)

International career
2007–2008	South Africa	3	(0)
- * Club domestic league appearances and goals

Petrus Ngebo, previously known as Petrus Mahlatsi, (born 1 April 1984) is a South African former soccer player who played as a forward.
