= Paul Evans (soccer, born 1973) =

South African footballer

Personal information
- Full name: Paul Anthony Evans
- Date of birth: 28 December 1973 (age 52)
- Place of birth: Newcastle, South Africa
- Position: Goalkeeper

Senior career*
Years	Team	Apps	(Gls)
1992–1995	Wits University	140	(0)
1995–1997	Leeds United	0	(0)
1996	→ Crystal Palace (loan)	0	(0)
1997	→ Bradford City (loan)	0	(0)
1998–1999	Supersport United	60	(0)
2000–2001	Mamelodi Sundowns	30	(0)
2001–2002	Jomo Cosmos	30	(0)
2002	Huddersfield Town	0	(0)
2002–2003	Sheffield Wednesday	7	(0)
2003	Rushden & Diamonds	5	(0)
2004–2009	Bath City	180	(0)
Total		452	(0)

International career
	South Africa U23	8	(0)
2001	South Africa	2	(0)
- * Club domestic league appearances and goals

Paul Anthony Evans (born 28 December 1973) is a South African retired professional footballer.

== Career ==
Son of Welsh parents, Evans started his career at his homeland with Wits University at the age of 18. After 140 league appearances for the South African club, he joined Leeds United on 1 August 1995, for £50,000.

Mainly a backup for John Lukic, Mark Beeney and Nigel Martyn, Evans made no appearances for Leeds United before being released at the end of the 1996–97 season. During his tenure at Elland Road, he had short-term loans to Crystal Palace and Bradford City, also without any playing time.

Evans then returned to South Africa and played for Supersport United, Mamelodi Sundowns and Jomo Cosmos before returning to English football in 2002, after joining Huddersfield Town in March. Four months later, Sheffield Wednesday signed Evans on a free transfer on 12 July 2002 as backup to Kevin Pressman. He made his debut for Wednesday against Derby County on 15 February 2003. Despite conceding two goals in his debut game, Evans had a decent spell at Hillsborough and went on to keep three clean sheets and concede just three goals in his next six games. At the end of the 2002–03 season, however, he fractured his pelvis. His new contract offer was withdrawn and he was released at the end of the season whilst still recovering from his injuries. Several months later he joined Division Two side Rushden & Diamonds where he made five appearances in all competitions before leaving the club on 1 December 2003. Evans then joined Southern League side Bath City in 2004. He retired in 2009 at Bath City F.C.

== International career ==
Evans played eight matches for South Africa under-23. He was called to replace injured Andre Arendse in South Africa's squad before the start of 1998 FIFA World Cup, but had to withdraw with a snapped cruciate ligament to his right knee and was himself replaced by Simon Gopane.

He made two senior appearances, against Mali and Gambia in 2001, in a friendly tournament. Although South Africa did not send their first team players, both matches were counted as full internationals.
