= Mfundo Shumana =

South African soccer player

Personal information
- Full name: Mfundo Shumana
- Date of birth: 17 December 1985 (age 40)
- Place of birth: Cape Town, South Africa
- Height: 1.65 m (5 ft 5 in)
- Position: Central midfielder

Team information
- Current team: Chippa United
- Number: 5

Youth career
- Young Strikers
- Vasco Da Gama
- Ajax Cape Town

Senior career*
Years	Team	Apps	(Gls)
2004–2009	Ajax Cape Town		
2009–2011	Moroka Swallows	16	(0)
2011–2012	Ajax Cape Town	3	(0)
2012–2014	Chippa United	14	(0)
- * Club domestic league appearances and goals

Mfundo Shumana (born 17 December 1985) is a South African formersoccer player who played as a midfielder in the Premier Soccer League.

== Personal ==
He hails from Nyanga on the Cape Flats.
