= John Tlale =

South African soccer player

Personal information
- Full name: John Rantsi Tlale
- Date of birth: 15 May 1967 (age 59)
- Place of birth: Kroonstad, South Africa
- Position: Goalkeeper

Senior career*
Years	Team	Apps	(Gls)
1992	Bloemfontein Celtic	3	(0)
1992–1995	Welkom Stars	81	(0)
1995–2002	Mamelodi Sundowns	173	(0)
2002–2003	Spartak Pretoria	0	(0)
Total		257	(0)

International career
1999–2002	South Africa	8	(0)

Managerial career
- 2012: Roses United
- * Club domestic league appearances and goals

John Tlale (born 15 May 1967) is a South African former soccer player who played at both professional and international levels as a goalkeeper. Tlale played club football for Bloemfontein Celtic, Welkom Stars, Mamelodi Sundowns and Spartak Pretoria; he also earned eight caps for the South African national side between 1999 and 2002 and was part of the squad that won the 1996 African Cup of Nations.

In November 2023 Tlale was arrested for allegedly stealing R 1.9 million with his business partners, being subsequently released on bail.

== International career ==
Tlale was part of South Africa's victorious squad at the 1996 African Cup of Nations, although he did not feature in any matches, serving as a backup to Andre Arendse alongside Roger de Sa. The same situation occurred at the 1998 tournament, where South Africa finished runners-up. Tlale made his international debut in a friendly against Zimbabwe on 16 June 1999, which ended in a 1–0 defeat. He subsequently travelled to his third consecutive African Cup of Nations at the 2000 edition, once again without making an appearance.
