= Sibusiso Mthethwa =

South African soccer player

Personal information
- Date of birth: 26 March 1991 (age 35)
- Height: 1.75 m (5 ft 9 in)
- Position: Defender

Team information
- Current team: Upington City

Senior career*
Years	Team	Apps	(Gls)
2012–2015	Free State Stars	17	(0)
2015–2017	University of Pretoria	36	(1)
2017–2018	Platinum Stars	9	(0)
2018–2022	Stellenbosch	71	(1)
2022–2024	Richards Bay	35	(0)
2024–	Upington City	5	(0)
- * Club domestic league appearances and goals as of 14 November 2024

Sibusiso Mthethwa (born 26 March 1991) is a South African professional soccer player who plays as a defender for South African side Upington City.
