= Kosta Papić =

Serbian football coach (born 1960)

Personal information
- Full name: Kostadin Papić
- Date of birth: 17 July 1960 (age 66)
- Place of birth: Novi Sad SR Serbia, SFR Yugoslavia

Managerial career
- Years: Team
- 1993–1998: Lobi Stars
- 1998–2002: Enyimba
- 2002–2003: Enugu Rangers
- 2003–2004: Kwara United
- 2004–2006: Orlando Pirates
- 2006–2007: Maritzburg United
- 2007: Kaizer Chiefs
- 2007–2009: Hearts of Oak
- 2009–2011: Young Africans
- 2011–2012: Young Africans
- 2013–2014: Black Leopards
- 2014: Chippa United
- 2014–2015: Polokwane City
- 2015–2016: Black Leopards
- 2016–2017: Royal Eagles
- 2017: Ethiopian Coffee
- 2017–2018: Royal Eagles
- 2018–2019: Eswatini
- 2020–2021: Hearts of Oak
- 2021: Black Leopards

Kosta Papić (Serbian Cyrillic: Коста Папић; born 17 July 1960) is a Serbian football coach.

== Coaching career ==
In December 2008, Papić moved to Ghana and coached Accra Hearts of Oak SC and left the club on mutual consent, due to what he termed managerial interference. He worked last as head coach by Accra Hearts of Oak SC up to July 2009. He was later signed as head coach of Young Africans FC under a two-year contract. He then coached Royal Eagles. He became coach of the Eswatini national team in December 2018. He left the role in December 2019.
