= Elias Ngwepe =

South African soccer player

Elias Ledile Ngwepe (born 4 March 1978) is a South African former soccer player who played as left-back or left-winger for Maritzburg United, Mamelodi Sundowns, Bloemfontein Celtic, Winners Park, Pietersburg Pillars and Platinum Stars.
