= Sammy Seabi =

South African soccer player

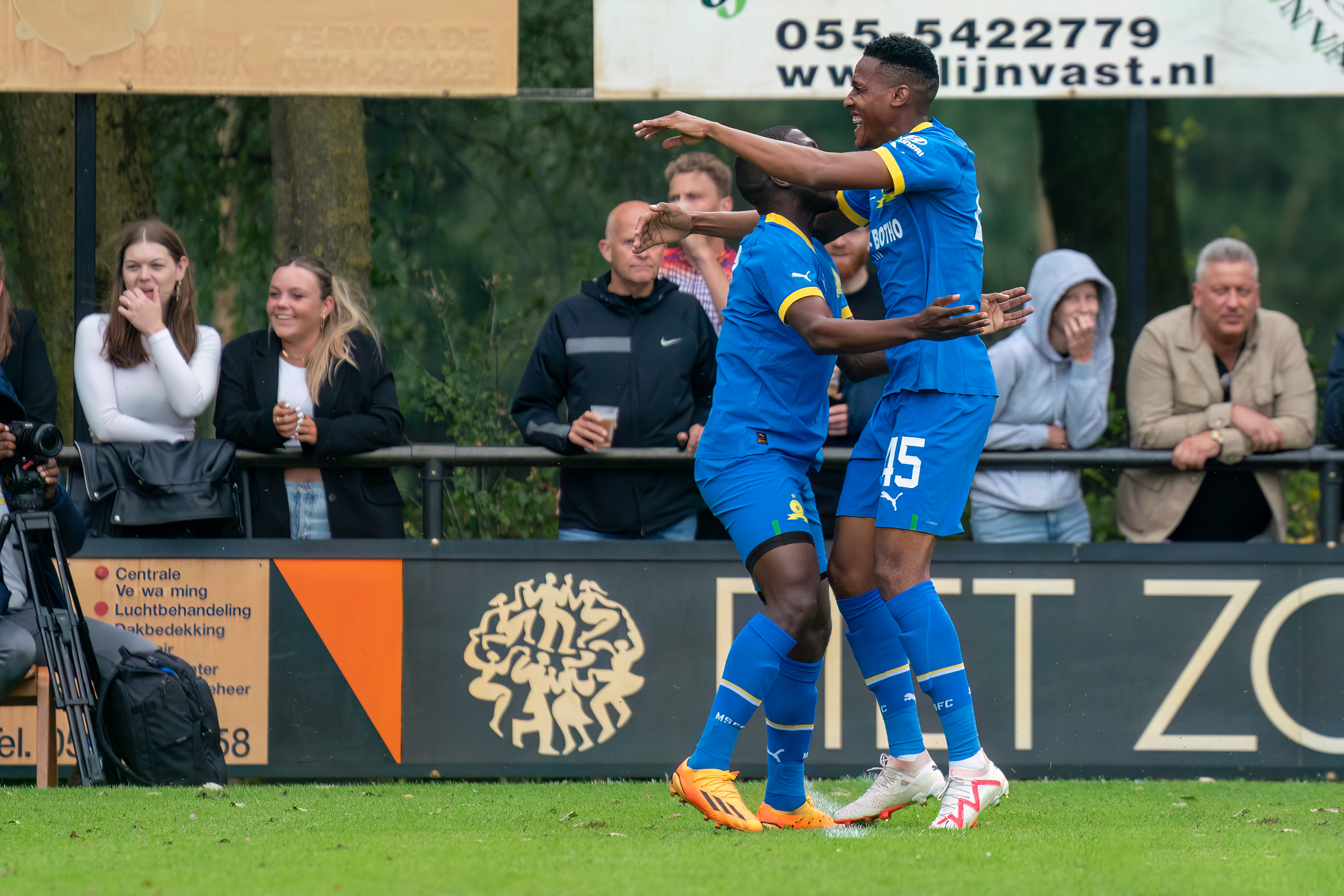

Personal information
- Full name: Sammy Maphoko Seabi
- Date of birth: 21 November 1994 (age 31)
- Place of birth: Polokwane, South Africa
- Height: 1.76 m (5 ft 9 1/2 in)
- Position: Midfielder

Team information
- Current team: Chippa United
- Number: 21

Senior career*
Years	Team	Apps	(Gls)
2016–2019	Polokwane City	79	(4)
2019–2024	Mamelodi Sundowns	6	(0)
2020–2021	→ Moroka Swallows (loan)	18	(0)
2021	→ Chippa United (loan)	13	(1)
2022	→ Chippa United (loan)	9	(1)
2022–2023	→ Sekhukhune United (loan)	20	(1)
2024–2025	Polokwane City	5	(0)
2025–	Chippa United	14	(0)
- * Club domestic league appearances and goals as of 4 January 2026

Sammy Maphoko Seabi (born 21 November 1994) is a South African soccer player who plays as a midfielder for South African Premier Division side Chippa United.

== Career ==
Seabi was born in Polokwane and started his career at Polokwane City, before signing for Mamelodi Sundowns in August 2019. He joined Moroka Swallows on loan in October 2020. In the summer of 2021, he joined Chippa United on loan for the 2021–22 season.

Following several loans, Chippa United wanted to secure Seabi on another loan in August 2024. Instead, he was released by Mamelodi Sundowns in September 2024, only to rejoin Polokwane City in October 2024.

== Honours ==
Mamelodi Sundowns

- South African Premier Division: 2019–20
- Nedbank Cup: 2019–20
- Telkom Knockout: 2019
