= Thabo September =

South African soccer player

Personal information
- Full name: Thabo Christopher September
- Date of birth: 3 November 1982 (age 43)
- Place of birth: Knysna, South Africa
- Height: 1.70 m (5 ft 7 in)
- Positions: Central defender; right-back

Senior career*
Years	Team	Apps	(Gls)
–2005	Knysna Bafana		
2005–2006	Bush Bucks		
2006–2016	SuperSport United	136	(1)

Managerial career
- 2024–2025: Chippa United
- * Club domestic league appearances and goals

Thabo September (born 3 November 1982) is a retired South African football defender who played for SuperSport United. He studied towards a degree in sports management at the PE Technikon campus in George.

He coached Chippa United from January 2024 to the end of the 2025 season, following which he purchased Komani United, a side in the Eastern Cape SAFA Second Division. As of March 2026, he is CEO of Komani.
