= Enocent Mkhabela =

South African soccer player (born 1989)

Personal information
- Full name: Enocent Thulani Mkhabela
- Date of birth: 30 April 1989 (age 37)
- Place of birth: Nelspruit, South Africa
- Position: Midfielder

Team information
- Current team: Highlands Park
- Number: 28

Senior career*
Years	Team	Apps	(Gls)
2008–2010	Blue Birds		
2010–2011	Sivutsa Stars	32	(5)
2011–2013	Platinum Stars	40	(5)
2013–2016	SuperSport United	51	(2)
2016–2017	Kaizer Chiefs	0	(0)
2017	→ Platinum Stars (loan)	10	(2)
2017–2018	Platinum Stars	20	(1)
2019–	Highlands Park	5	(0)
- * Club domestic league appearances and goals as of 22:55, 13 May 2019 (UTC)

Enocent Mkhabela (born 30 April 1989 in Nelspruit, Mpumalanga) is a South African football (soccer) player who plays as a midfielder for Highlands Park.

Mkhabela made his debut in the PSL for Platinum Stars in 2011, before joining Supersport United in 2013. He joined Kaizer Chiefs in 2016 but returned to Platinum Stars on loan for the 2016/17 season, where he will work under his former coach Cavin Johnson.
