= Thabo Qalinge =

South African footballer

Personal information
- Date of birth: 28 August 1991 (age 35)
- Place of birth: Soweto, South Africa
- Position: Midfielder

Youth career
- Soshanguve Sunshine
- SuperSport United

Senior career*
Years	Team	Apps	(Gls)
2012	SuperSport United		
2012–2014	Mpumalanga Black Aces	53	(4)
2014–2019	Orlando Pirates	62	(4)
2019–2020	SuperSport United	2	(0)
2020–2023	AmaZulu	31	(2)
- * Club domestic league appearances and goals as of 1 May 2023

Thabo Qalinge (born 28 August 1991) is a South African soccer player.

== Career statistics ==
As of 30 January 2018

Appearances and goals by club, season and competition
Club	Season	League			Cup		League Cup		Other		Total	
Club	Season	Division	Apps	Goals	Apps	Goals	Apps	Goals	Apps	Goals	Apps	Goals
Mpumalanga Black Aces	2012–13	National First Division	24	2	0	0	0	0	3 (Note: Appearances in PSL playoff tournament)	1	27	3
Mpumalanga Black Aces	2013–14	Premier Soccer League	29	2	1	0	1	0	0	0	31	2
Mpumalanga Black Aces	Total		53	4	1	0	1	0	3	1	58	5
Orlando Pirates	2014–15	Premier Soccer League	11	1	0	0	2	1	3 (Note: Appearances in MTN 8)	0	16	2
Orlando Pirates	2015–16	Premier Soccer League	14	0	4	0	0	0	0	0	18	0
Orlando Pirates	2016–17	Premier Soccer League	9	0	1	0	1	0	1	0	12	0
Orlando Pirates	2017–18	Premier Soccer League	12	2	0	0	2	1	0	0	14	3
Orlando Pirates	Total		46	3	5	0	5	2	4	0	60	5
Career totals			99	7	6	0	6	3	7	1	118	10
