= Letladi Madubanya =

South African soccer player

Personal information
- Full name: Letladi Ignatius Madubanya
- Date of birth: 13 February 1984 (age 42)
- Place of birth: Alexandra, South Africa
- Height: 1.81 m (5 ft 11 in)
- Positions: Defensive midfielder; central midfielder

Team information
- Current team: Baroka
- Number: 6

Youth career
- Alexandra United
- Arcadia Shepherds

Senior career*
| Years | Team | Apps | (Gls) |
| 2005–2007 | Tembisa Classic | | |
| 2007–2008 | Bay United | | |
| 2008–2011 | Supersport United | 51 | (1) |
| 2011–2013 | Bloemfontein Celtic | 40 | (7) |
| 2013–2014 | AmaZulu | 3 | (0) |
| 2014 | Bidvest Wits | 10 | (0) |
| 2014–2016 | Platinum Stars | 41 | (4) |
| 2017–2019 | Baroka | 46 | (2) |
- * Club domestic league appearances and goals

Letladi Madubanya (born 13 February 1984 in Alexandra) is a South African football (soccer) defensive midfielder who last played for Baroka in the Premier Soccer League.

Madubanya has won the league twice with SuperSport United, and his goal against Ajax Cape Town on the final day of the 2016/17 season ensured Baroka finished 15th and qualified for the promotion playoffs.
