= Steven Hoffman (South African soccer) =

South African soccer player

Personal information
- Date of birth: 31 January 1994 (age 32)
- Place of birth: Cape Town, South Africa
- Height: 1.92 m (6 ft 4 in)
- Position: Goalkeeper

Youth career
- Edgemead
- –2011: Bidvest Wits

Senior career*
Years	Team	Apps	(Gls)
2011–2014	Bidvest Wits	8	(0)
2014–2016	Vasco da Gama	50	(0)
2016–2020	Cape Umoya United	6	(0)
2020–2021	Llapi	10	(0)
- * Club domestic league appearances and goals

Steven Hoffman (born 31 January 1994) is a South African former professional soccer player who played as a goalkeeper.

== Club career ==
=== Llapi ===
Hoffman had a trial at Football Superleague of Kosovo club Llapi in September 2020 and signed a one-year contract with the club for an undisclosed fee on 19 October 2020 and received squad number 36. Five days later, he made his debut for Llapi after being named in the starting line-up, and saved a penalty of Almir Kryeziu in a 2–0 home win against Arbëria.
