= Ayanda Nkosi =

South African footballer

Personal information
- Date of birth: 23 January 1993 (age 33)
- Place of birth: South Africa
- Height: 1.74 m (5 ft 9 in)
- Position: Attacking midfielder

Senior career*
Years	Team	Apps	(Gls)
2013–2016	Maritzburg United	12	(2)
2016	Free State Stars	13	(2)
2016–2019	Orlando Pirates	10	(1)
2018–2019	→ Jomo Cosmos (loan)	7	(1)
2019–2020	Free State Stars	3	(0)
- * Club domestic league appearances and goals

Ayanda Nkosi (born 23 January 1993) is a South African footballer who plays for Northern Cape ABC Motsepe side Upington City F.C. He played for Free State Stars.

== Career ==
Ayanda Nkosi has played in the University of Joburg's residence leagues. Maritzburg United F.C. proclaimed his release in 2016 by mutual consent.

Prior to the 2016-17 South African Premier Division, Nkosi signed a three-year deal to play for Orlando Pirates FC. Early in his Orlando Pirates career, he was said to have been involved in a tavern brawl.

Nkosi scored his first goal for Orlando Pirates FC in a 2-1 loss to Maritzburg United F.C. As a substitute for Orlando Pirates FC, he was fighting for a starting berth in the club – he said: "Competition is a part of football. In football there is competition whether you like it or not...."
