= Sirgio Kammies =

South African soccer player

Personal information
- Date of birth: 7 February 1998 (age 28)
- Place of birth: Elsie's River, South Africa
- Height: 1.74 m (5 ft 9 in)
- Position: Defender

Team information
- Current team: Chippa United
- Number: 25

Youth career
- –2016: Ajax Cape Town

Senior career*
Years	Team	Apps	(Gls)
2016–2019	Ajax Cape Town	20	(0)
2020–2021	Cape Umoya United	22	(0)
2021–2022	Cape Town All Stars	27	(2)
2022–	Chippa United	76	(0)

International career^{‡}
2017	South Africa U20		
- * Club domestic league appearances and goals as of 4 January 2026 ‡ National team caps and goals as of 8 April 2024

Sirgio Kammies (born 7 February 1998) is a South African soccer player who plays as a defender for Chippa United in the Premier Soccer League.

Kammies was born in Elsie's River and joined the Ajax Cape Town academy. He was selected to represent South Africa U20 in the 2017 FIFA U-20 World Cup, as a replacement for unavailable Reeve Frosler. Kammies was then supposed to play the 2017 COSAFA U-20 Cup as well, but Ajax Cape Town declined to release him for international duty as he instead made his Premier Division debut in December 2017.

Kammies later played for Cape Umoya United before that club was sold to Venda, and he instead joined Cape Town All Stars. He was brought to Chippa United in the summer of 2022 as a part of a large influx of new players, with 16 signings being announced together.

In 2024 he selected for Bafana Bafana to contest the 2024 COSAFA Cup. Kammies did not play any of the matches, however.
