= Craig Rosslee =

South African soccer player and manager

Personal information
- Full name: Craig William Rosslee
- Date of birth: 1 January 1970 (age 56)
- Place of birth: Cape Town, South Africa

Managerial career
- Years: Team
- 2007–2009: Ajax Cape Town
- 2012–2014: AmaZulu
- 2015: Moroka Swallows

Craig William Rosslee (born 1 January 1970) is a South African association football manager and former player.

Rosslee had a playing career which included time with Cape Town Spurs and Hellenic. He made his league debut for Cape Town Spurs in 1990 and retired in 2004 due to several shoulder injuries. Rosslee was ranked among the better defenders of his time in South Africa but was not capped at international level for South Africa.

He linked up with Ajax Cape Town as a junior coach, eventually becoming the head of the club's youth development programme and had short uneventful stints in lower divisions but can claim fame for his run to the last eight of the prestigious ABSA Cup with the youthful Ajax reserve team before they narrowly lost to Silver Stars.

In 2007, he was appointed coach of Ajax CT.

In 2009, Rosslee left Ajax, and later that year joined the Orlando Pirates as an assistant coach.

Rosslee joined AmaZulu as manager on 30 November 2012 on a 2 1/2-year deal. He remained in his role until being dismissed on 15 October 2014.

He became Moroka Swallows's fourth manager of the season in March 2015, a little over two months before the end of the 2014–15 season, but was unable to save them from their first ever relegation from the top division.

In 2016, Rosslee was appointed as the technical director of Cape Town City FC. He left the club in March 2017.
