= Atlie F.C. =

South African football club

Atlie FC
- Full name: Atlie Football Club
- Nickname(s): Rea Shesha
- Founded: 2011
- Ground: Sinaba Stadium, Daveyton, Benoni
- Capacity: 15,000
Home colours	Away colours

Atlie FC is a South African football (soccer) club based in Benoni, Gauteng.

Atlie came into existence in 2011 after the club's owners bought out Durban based side Nathi Lions and moved the club to Ekurhuleni.

The team were relegated from the 2011–12 National First Division finishing the season 16th place. Carara Kicks later had eighteen points removed due to fielding an ineligible player and Atlie were moved up to 15th place.

Following the club's relegation, the owner Thabo Mathamela began talks with FC AK with a view to purchasing a controlling stake in the club.

== See also ==
- Category:Atlie F.C. players
