= Lucky Mohomi =

South African soccer player

Personal information
- Full name: Lucky Benjamine Mohomi
- Date of birth: 10 May 1991 (age 35)
- Position: Midfielder

Team information
- Current team: Richards Bay
- Number: 8

Senior career*
Years	Team	Apps	(Gls)
2013–2014	United	19	(0)
2014–2015	Garankuwa United	14	(1)
2015–2016	Free State Stars	24	(3)
2016–2020	Mamelodi Sundowns	20	(0)
2020–2021	SuperSport United	10	(2)
2021	Venda	6	(0)
2022–2023	Marumo Gallants	19	(1)
2023–	Richards Bay	9	(0)
- * Club domestic league appearances and goals as of 28 April 2024

Lucky Mohomi (born 10 May 1991) is a South African soccer player who last played as a midfielder for Richards Bay in the South African Premier Division.

Mohomi joined Mamelodi Sundowns from the Free State Stars in 2016. In his first season, Mamelodi Sundowns won the 2016 CAF Champions League. After 2017 and the arrival in the squad of Andile Jali, Mohomi fell out of favour and only played a cup game once in a while. He was also denied the chance to join another club on loan.

After leaving for SuperSport United in 2020, Mohomi contended that he had "wasted" several years of his career, but at the same time "I am where God wants me to be". In 2021 Mohomi ended up in second-tier team Venda, which was a disappointment according to The Citizen's sources. He left Venda ahead of 2022, and was on trial with Marumo Gallants and Baroka during the winter 2022 transfer window.

Mohomi ended up signing for Marumo Gallants in 2022, participating in the 2022-23 CAF Confederation Cup whilst also facing relegation from the domestic league. After Marumo Gallants's relegation, Mohomi went on to Richards Bay. Towards the end of the 2024 winter transfer window, it was reported that Richards Bay released Mohomi and three others.
