= Andile Mbenyane =

South African soccer player

Personal information
- Date of birth: 15 March 1988 (age 38)
- Place of birth: Paarl, South Africa
- Position: Forward

Senior career*
Years	Team	Apps	(Gls)
2007–2009	Ajax Cape Town		
- → Ikapa Sporting (loan)
2009–2021	Chippa United		
2022–2024	Chippa United	25	(0)
- * Club domestic league appearances and goals as of 16 March 2025

Andile Mbenyane (born 15 March 1988) is a South African soccer player who spent most of his career as a forward for Chippa United in the South African Premier Division.

== Career ==
Born in Paarl, he joined the academy of Ajax Cape Town and got his senior debut for that club in the 2007–08 Premier Soccer League. He did not break through in the first team, and was first sent on loan to Ikapa Sporting, then permanently to Chippa United. With Chippa United, he won promotion and helped establish the club in the Premier Division, and eventually became team captain. In 2019 he played his 100th Premier Division game for Chippa United.

According to Mbenyane, the Chippa United squad was given "a scare" in the winter of 2019 when the club released 13 players, resulting in the remaining players no longer "dragging their feet at training". In March 2020, it was reported that Mbenyane himself would be released by Chippa United after 11 years in the club. As the manager Rulani Mokwena allegedly had "identified deadwood" in the squad, there were talks about disciplinary problems and missing practices. Club owner Siviwe "Chippa" Mpengesi accused Mbenyane of growing too content in the club, and asked the player to "come to the party and pick up his socks". The player was not released, however, and started yet another season with Chippa United in 2020–21.

Mbenyane was injured during the spring of 2021, and could not take part in the 2020-21 Nedbank Cup final. Mbenyane was subsequently released during the summer of 2021. According to Chippa Mpengesi, this was "painful", but happened at the behest of new manager Gavin Hunt. In the fall of 2021 Mbenyane reportedly trained with Second Division club BCM Stars. He was back in Chippa United's matchday squad in February 2022. His first goal during this spell in the club came in the 2023-24 Nedbank Cup against Ravens.

Mbenyane retired from soccer in May 2024.

== Personal life ==
Mbenyane was married to Ahluma Nombulelo Kala Mbenyane, who died in a car accident in 2015. He later married Pakama Aba.
