= Zaid Patel =

South African soccer player (born 1994)

Muhammad Zaid Patel
Personal information
- Full name: Muhammad Zaid Patel
- Date of birth: 4 January 1994 (age 32)
- Place of birth: Krugersdorp, Gauteng, South Africa
- Height: 1.90 m (6 ft 3 in)
- Position: Striker

Team information
- Current team: Loja CD

Youth career
- CRC Football Club
- Azaadville United
- 2010–2012: Bidvest Wits

Senior career*
| Years | Team | Apps | (Gls) |
| 2012– | Bidvest Wits | 4 | (1) |
| 2013 | → Mpumalanga Black Aces (loan) | 4 | (2) |

International career^{‡}
| 2012 | Bafana Bafana U21 | 0 | (0) |
- * Club domestic league appearances and goals as of 10 February 2013 ‡ National team caps and goals as of 10 February 2013

Muhammad Zaid Patel (born 4 January 1994) is a South African football (soccer) striker.

== Career ==
Patel played Junior League football from the age of 6 for Azaadville United. In 2008/9 he was selected to play for Malaysian Club, CRC Football Club in Penang Island. Successful trials gained Patel a selection in The Bidvest WITS Youth Academy where he was a prolific scorer for 2 seasons. He toured with youth division to Denmark to play in the Brondby Cup in 2011, and played 5 games in the Future Champs Tournament held in South Africa in 2011 scoring 3 goals.

Patel signed junior contract for Bidvest Wits PSL side in January 2012. He scored his first goal for Bidvest Wits against Sundowns coming on in the 80th minute, and scoring the equalizer in the 90th minute in the SA Premier League, PSL.

Patel was loaned to Black Aces in January 2013. He has since scored two goals for the club in four appearances.

Patel was then on loan at National First Division team Stellenbosch FC in 2016, however he was sent home in December.
