= Thabiso Semenya =

South African soccer player

Personal information
- Date of birth: 17 September 1982 (age 44)
- Place of birth: Moletjie, Limpopo, South Africa
- Position: Defender

Senior career*
Years	Team	Apps	(Gls)
2004–2006	Mpumalanga Highlanders		
2006–2008	Barberton City Stars		
2008–2011	Carara Kicks		
2011–2016	Platinum Stars	60	(0)
2016–2018	Polokwane City	56	(1)
2018–2019	Baroka	17	(0)
2020	Polokwane City	4	(0)
- * Club domestic league appearances and goals as of 20:02, 5 October 2020 (UTC)

Thabiso Semenya (born 17 September 1982) is a South African soccer player who plays as a defender. He was born in Moletjie in Limpopo and has played club football for Mpumalanga Highlanders, Barberton City Stars, Carara Kicks, Platinum Stars, Polokwane City and Baroka.

== Early life and career ==
Semenya was born in Moletjie near Polokwane, and attended a Catholic boarding school named PAX. He studied Geology at the University of Limpopo, but dropped out in his second year to pursue a career in football. He played for Mpumalanga Highlanders in the third tier of South African soccer between 2004 and 2006 whilst working for Bohlabela District Municipality, and later joined Barberton City Stars in 2006 whilst working as a miners' assistant.

Semenya was spotted playing for Barberton City Stars in the Second Division play-offs, and subsequently joined National First Division side Carara Kicks in 2008. He left the club in 2011 to join Platinum Stars on a three-month deal in September 2011, before his contract was extended until the end of the season. He became a regular player for the club in his first season, appearing in 14 league matches for the club. He signed a two-year deal with the club at the end of the season. In June 2014, he extended his contract with Platinum Stars by a further year. He was eventually released by the club in 2016, after five years at the club.

Following his release from Platinum Stars, he joined Polokwane City in August 2016. He made 56 league appearances over the next two seasons before being released by the club in summer 2018. He signed for Baroka in October 2018. He appeared in seventeen league matches for Baroka across the 2018–19 season, before leaving the club at the end of the season after the club opted not to renew his contract.

In January 2020, he returned to former club Polokwane City on a contract until the end of the season.

== Personal life ==
In August 2010, Semenya was involved in a car accident but was not seriously injured.

His wife died in a car accident in Rustenburg in March 2016; he was also involved in the accident but only sustained minor injuries.

Semenya remarried in April 2019, bot put his honeymoon on hold to help Baroka fight relegation.
