= Blackburn Rovers F.C. (South Africa) =

Association football club

Blackburn Rovers East London
- Full name: Blackburn Rovers Football Club
- Nickname(s): AmaRover
- Founded: 1965
- Dissolved: 2014
- Ground: Buffalo City Stadium, East London
- Capacity: 16,000
- 2013-14: National First Division, 16th (relegated)
Home colours	Away colours

Blackburn Rovers was a professional football club from East London, Eastern Cape, South Africa. It played its home games at the Buffalo City Stadium and last competed in the 2013–14 season of the National First Division, the second tier of the South African football league pyramid. It was relegated at the end of the season to the Eastern Cape provincial division of the SAFA Second Division after finishing bottom of the league.

== Honours ==
- SAFA Second Division Eastern Cape
  - Champions: 1999–00, 2001–02, 2008–09, 2009–10 (promoted)
  - Runners-up: 2002–03 (promoted)
