= Roses United F.C. =

Association football club based in Bloenfontein, South Africa

Roses United
- Full name: Roses United Football Club
- Founded: 2009
- Ground: Westdene Stadium, Bloemfontein
- Capacity: 5,000
- Chairman: Max Tshabalala
- Coach: (South Africa) Benjamin Reed
- 2011–12: Vodacom League winners
Home colours	Away colours

Roses United is a South African football club based in Bloemfontein, Free State province.

The club was founded in 2009, where they acquired the Castle League franchise of the nearby Bloemfontein club Mangaung FC; which were a newly promoted club to Vodacom League, and not to be confused with Mangaung City in the same division. Both in 2009–10 and 2010–11, Roses United won the Free State division of Vodacom League, but at the playoffs fell short to win a further promotion to the National First Division.

== History ==
Around the beginning of 2009, Roses United bought the Castle League franchise of the now defunct Mangaung FC, to start campaigning in the SAFA Vodacom League. In July 2009 the club received an important transport sponsorship from Ruwacon, providing the team with a mini bus and money to cover all future transportation related costs. When the new sponsorship was announced at a press meeting, the manager of the team proclaimed, that the goal of the club was to qualify for the National First Division, within the next 3 years. The motto of the club was said to be: Roses United will keep on keeping on.

The club won the Free State Province in the Vodacom League, with a 10-point gap over runner-up Maluti Fet College in 2009–10, but ended third in the Coastal Stream at the promotion play-offs. The next season, another provincial victory was secured, but this time with only a 2-point gap over runner-up Botshabelo. By the end of the season, they were in fact only the runner-up of the division, trailing 1 point behind Botshabelo. After having successfully appealed the result of one of their matches, -an initial 2–1 defeat against Sasolburg Juventus, being corrected by the Sports Court into a 2–0 win for Roses United-, the victory of the province was however secured. The reasoning behind the changed result of the match, was that it had been unfairly abrupt after 75 minutes, when Rugby fans suddenly invaded the pitch; and as Sasolburg Juventus had failed to protect the security of the pitch, they were imposed a disciplinary defeat by the court. At the subsequent promotional play-offs in June 2011, Roses United delivered a respectable performance with 7 points in 4 matches. Not quite good enough to win promotion, but good enough to achieve another third place in the Coastal Stream.

== Roses United managers ==
- (South Africa) John Tlale (1 Jul 2012 – 8 Oct 2012)

== Club records and best achievements ==
- Won the Free State Province of Vodacom League in 2009–10 and 2010–11.

=== Historical league results ===
- 2008–09 (VL) – 12th (in Free State)
- 2009–10 (VL) – 1st (in Free State)
- 2010–11 (VL) – 1st (in Free State)
- 2011–12 (VL) – 1st (in Free State)

== Stadium ==
The club always played their home games in Bloemfontein. After buying the league franchise of Mangaung FC, they played second half of the 2008–09 season, at their home venue in University of the Free State. In all subsequent seasons, the club however opted to play at Westdene Stadium, being situated just 2 km South from the club house in Bayswater.
