= Eleazar Rodgers =

South African soccer player

Personal information
- Full name: Eleazar Darryl Rodgers
- Date of birth: 22 January 1985 (age 41)
- Place of birth: Cape Town, South Africa
- Height: 1.90 m (6 ft 3 in)
- Position: Forward

Team information
- Current team: Cape Umoya United

Youth career
- Kuils River

Senior career*
| Years | Team | Apps | (Gls) |
| 2006–2012 | Engen Santos | 145 | (31) |
| 2012–2014 | Mamelodi Sundowns | 15 | (2) |
| 2013–2014 | →Ajax Cape Town (loan) | 23 | (5) |
| 2014–2016 | Platinum Stars | 47 | (13) |
| 2016–2018 | Bidvest Wits | 54 | (28) |
| 2018–2019 | Free State Stars | 24 | (4) |
| 2019–2020 | Ajax Cape Town | 30 | (9) |
| 2020–2021 | Cape Umoya United | 25 | (3) |
| 2021–2022 | Cape Town All Stars | 15 | (1) |

International career^{‡}
| 2007–2016 | South Africa | 5 | (0) |
- * Club domestic league appearances and goals as of 15 November 2022 ‡ National team caps and goals as of 11 February 2018

Eleazar Rodgers (born 22 January 1985) is a South African professional soccer player who last played as a forward for Cape Town All Stars United. He has represented South Africa at senior international level. He is from Kuils River in the Western Cape.

Rodgers made his international debut for South Africa in 2007 against Malawi.
