= Milano United F.C. =

Milano United
- Full name: Milano United Football Club
- Founded: 1986; 40 years ago
- Ground: Grassy Park Stadium, Cape Town
- Capacity: 1,000
- Chairman: Nasief Brenner
- Coach: (South Africa) Rafiek Taylor
- League: National First Division
- 2014–15: National First Division, 6th
Home colours	Away colours

Milano United was a South African football club based in the Grassy Park suburb of the city of Cape Town that played in the National First Division.

Milano won promotion to the National First Division (the second tier of South African football) in July 2012 after winning the 2011–12 Western Cape Vodacom League stream and winning three games at the playoffs stage.

The club sold their National First Division club status to Tshakhuma Tsha Madzivhandila FC in August 2017, prior to the start of the 2017–18 season.

== Honours ==
- 2011–12 SAFA Second Division Western Cape winners, Coastal stream winners (promoted)
