= Chippa United F.C. =

South African football club

Chippa United
- Full name: Chippa United Football Club
- Nickname: Chilli Boys
- Founded: January 2010; 16 years ago
- Ground: Buffalo City Stadium (night games); Nelson Mandela Bay Stadium
- Capacity: 16,000
- Chairman: Siviwe Mpengesi
- Manager: Vusumuzi Vilakazi
- League: South African Premiership
- 2025–26: 13th of 16
- Website: chippaunitedfc.co.za
Home colours	Away colours	Third colours

Former club crest

Chippa United Football Club (often known as Chilli boys or Chippa) is a South African professional football club based in East London in the Eastern Cape province, having previously been based in Nyanga suburb of the city of Cape Town. The club's first team currently plays in the Premiership, with the reserve team playing in the PSL's reserve league. The team plays most of its home games at the Buffalo City Stadium, while hosting night matches at Nelson Mandela Bay Stadium.

== History ==
The club was founded in January 2010 when Chippa Mpengesi purchased the Vodacom League franchise of Paarl based club, Mbekweni Cosmos, for R400,000. Cosmos had won promotion from the Castle League at the end of the 2008–09 season, and started campaigning in the Vodacom League in the 2009–10 season. In 2010–11 season, the club began playing under the name, Chippa United.

Chippa United's first season was very successful with the club winning the Western Cape Vodacom League before winning the Vodacom League National Coastal Stream to achieve promotion to the National First Division. Chippa were also crowned the overall 2010–11 Vodacom League National champions after beating Inland Stream winners Sivutsa Stars.

The club finished their debut season in the National First Division in 2nd place behind University of Pretoria and won promotion to the Premiership via the play-offs in June 2012. Chippa used five managers during the course of the 2012–13 PSL season and finished 15th, eventually getting relegated after failing to win the playoffs.

A feeder team, called Peace Makers, was once owned by Chippa United, and ran teams under the club's umbrella. It ran a team in the SAFA Second Division and also junior teams in Cape Town's junior leagues. The Peace Makers franchise was sold to Milano United before the beginning of the 2013–14 season. In Port Elizabeth the club runs its youth teams under the Chippa United name, and play in the Port Elizabeth Football Association leagues.

=== Ownership ===
Chippa United is wholly owned by Chippa Investment Holdings, which is a Cape Town-based construction, security and cleaning company founded by Siviwe "Chippa" Mpengesi.

During 2015, the club was effectively under the administration of Access Facilities and Leisure Management, the operating company of Nelson Mandela Bay Stadium.

== Stadium ==
During the club's early seasons in Cape Town, it used Philippi Stadium as its home ground. The stadium was used from 2009–10 to 2011–12 and again in 2013–14.

Following the 2011–12 the club was promoted from the Premier Soccer League's National First Division to the Premiership. Philippi Stadium was deemed not to be up to standard to host matches in the Premiership. Due to this, the club hosted its matches at Athlone Stadium and Cape Town Stadium. However, the ground had previously been used by Vasco da Gama during the 2010–11 season. From March 2013, the club was allowed to host matches at Philippi Stadium.

Following the 2013–14 season the club was promoted to the Premiership once more. During the off season, the club announced that it would move to Port Elizabeth. The club and municipality announced a three-year deal to use Nelson Mandela Bay Stadium. The municipality also announced that certain matches would be played at the city's Wolfson Stadium and Gelvandale Stadium. During the 2014–15 season, the club was forced to host matches at the Wolfson Stadium.

According to a report tabled by the Nelson Mandela Bay mayor's office, Chippa United's contract to play in the city is for 18 years, beginning with the 2014–15 season, and thus running to 2031–32.

During the 2015–16 season, the club announced plans to host some of its matches at East London's Buffalo City Stadium. The club cited the high cost of hosting matches at the Nelson Mandela Bay Stadium, and lack of paying spectators as reasons for the decision.

=== Training ground ===
On the club's movement to Port Elizabeth, it announced that it intended to use Wolfson Stadium as its training ground, and intended pursuing a long-term lease from the Nelson Mandela Bay Metropolitan Municipality. As the ground was not yet up to standard, the club announced that it would use Gelvandale Stadium for training, until the necessary upgrades were completed at Wolfson Stadium. During the 2014–15 and 2015–16 seasons, the club split its training at Nelson Mandela Metropolitan University's Second Avenue Campus and Nelson Mandela Bay Stadium's outdoor fields. Nelson Mandela Bay Stadium's outer fields are shared with the Eastern Province Elephants rugby team.

== Achievements ==
- NFD Champions:

2013–14

- PSL promotion/relegation play-offs:

2011–12

- Second Division National play-offs:

2010–11

- Second Division Western Cape Stream:

2010–11

- Metropolitan Under-19 Premier Cup

2012 (As Philippi United)

- U-17 Engen Knockout Challenge

2015
2016

== Club records ==
=== Premiership ===
Season	Division	Result	Pld	Won	Draw	Lose	GF	GA	GD	Pts	Nedbank Cup	Telkom KO	MTN 8
2009-10	3rd	13th	30	10	5	15	48	48	0	35			
2010-11	3rd	Winner	32	26	5	1	96	18	78	83			
2011-12	NFD	2nd/Promoted	30	14	9	7	46	29	17	51	1st round	—	—
2012-13	PSL	15th/Relegated	30	6	10	14	28	41	-13	28	R32		
2013-14	NFD	1st/Winner	30	17	7	6	54	36	18	58	1st Round	—	—
2014-15	PSL	14th	30	7	9	14	30	47	-17	30	R32	R16	–

- 2012–13 – 15th (relegated)
- 2014–15 – 14th
- 2015–16 – 6th
- 2016–17 – 13th
- 2017–18 – 10th
- 2018–19 – 12th
- 2019–20 – 11th
- 2020–21 – 15th
- 2021–22 – 14th
- 2022–23 – 14th
- 2023–24 – 12th
- 2024–25 – 11th
- 2025–26 – 13th

=== National First Division ===
- 2011–12 – 2nd (promoted via play-off)
- 2013–14 – 1st (promoted)

=== SAFA Second Division ===
- 2009–10 – 13th (as Mbekweni Cosmos)
- 2010–11 – 1st (promoted via play-off)

=== Nedbank Cup ===
- 2011–12 – NFD qualification round
- 2012–13 – Round of 32
- 2013–14 – NFD qualification round
- 2014–15 – Round of 32
- 2015–16 – Round of 32

=== Telkom Knockout ===
- 2012 – Round of 16
- 2014 – Round of 16
- 2015 – Round of 16

=== MTN 8 ===
- 2016 – Semi-finals*

=== PSL Reserve League ===
- 2014–15 – 6th (Group B)
- 2015–16 – 16th

== Shirt sponsor & kit manufacturer ==
Period	Kit manufacturer	Shirt sponsor
2010–11	Rada Sport	Vacant
2011–12	Adidas	Vacant
2012–13	Kappa	Vodacom
2013–14	Umbro	Chippa Holdings
2014	Nike	Chippa Holdings
2015	Umbro	Chippa Holdings
2015–16	Puma	Chippa Holdings
2016-17	Canterbury	Chippa Holdings
2017-20	Umbro	Nelson Mandela Bay Municipality
2020-21	Monflair	Nelson Mandela Bay Municipality

== Internationals ==
Players who have made an appearance for national football team, while playing for Chippa United. Caps and period refer to the number of caps earned, and the period in which they are earned, while at Chippa United.

Player	National team	Caps	Period
David Zulu	South Africa	0	2013
James Okwuosa	Nigeria	2	2013
Thamsanqa Sangweni	South Africa	1	2014
Chrisopher Komane	South Africa	?	2014
Siyabonga Zulu	South Africa	?	2014
William Twala	South Africa	2	2015
Aristide Bancé	Burkina Faso	3	2015
Zitha Macheke	South Africa U-23	1	2015
Zaid Patel	South Africa U-23	?	2015
Diamond Thopola	South Africa	0	2016
Daniel Akpeyi	Nigeria Olympic Team	1	2016
Stanley Nwabali	Nigeria	33	2024–
Sinoxolo Kwayiba	South Africa	5	2024–

== Current squad ==
As of 13 September 2026

Note: Flags indicate national team as defined under FIFA eligibility rules; some limited exceptions apply. Players may hold more than one non-FIFA nationality.

No.	Pos.	Nation	Player
1	GK	RSA	Elson Sithole
3	DF	RSA	Azola Ntsabo
5	DF	RSA	Seun Ndlovu
6	MF	RSA	Muhammad Carrim
7	FW	CMR	Bienvenu Eva Nga
8	FW	RSA	Khaya Mfecane
9	FW	SWZ	Justice Figuareido
10	MF	RSA	Azola Matrose
11	MF	RSA	Banele Hlophe
15	MF	RSA	Azola Tshobeni
20	MF	RSA	Goodman Mosele
21	MF	RSA	Sammy Seabi
22	DF	RSA	Abbubaker Mobara
23	GK	NGR	Stanley Nwabali
24	MF	RSA	Ayabulela Konqobe Magqwaka
25	DF	RSA	Sirgio Kammies

No.	Pos.	Nation	Player
26	FW	RSA	Bandile Dlamini
27	MF	MLI	Daba Diakité
28	DF	RSA	Boy Madingwana
29	FW	RSA	Ntuthuko Mlotshwa
30	DF	RSA	Thabang Molaoa
31	DF	RSA	Imraan Jones
33	DF	RSA	Obakhe Tshaya
35	DF	RSA	Harold Majadibodu
36	MF	RSA	Asanele Bonani
37	DF	RSA	Tshepang Makara
40	FW	RSA	Muzomuhle Khanyi (on loan from Stellenbosch)
44	MF	BFA	Ibrahim Bancé
45	FW	RSA	Somila Ntsundwana
47	FW	RSA	Xolani Sithole
50	DF	RSA	Bongani Sam
66	DF	ZIM	Isheanesu Mauchi

In July 2026, Daba Benoit Diakité joined South African club Chippa United from FC Sheriff Tiraspol. The Malian midfielder arrived at the club after spells with Djoliba AC and Sheriff Tiraspol, looking for a new challenge in his career.

== Managerial history ==
- (South Africa) Manqoba Mngqithi (9 July 2012 – 20 Aug 2012)
- (South Africa) Julius Dube (23 Aug 2012 – Sept 12 2012)
- (South Africa) Roger Sikhakhane (Sept 13 2012 – 28 Oct 2012)
- (South Africa) Farouk Abrahams (28 Oct 2012 – 29 Jan 2013)
- (Zimbabwe) Wilfred Mugeyi (29 Jan 2013 – 11 April 2013)
- (England) Mark Harrison (12 April 2013 – 7 Oct 2013)
- (South Africa) Ian Palmer (8 Oct 2013 – 27 Jan 2014)
- (Serbia) Vladislav Herić (29 Jan 2014 – 30 June 2014)
- (Serbia) Kosta Papić (1 July 2014 – Sept 3 2014)
- (South Africa) Roger Sikhakhane (Sept 4 2014 – 5 Jan 2015)
- (Germany) Ernst Middendorp (5 Jan 2015 – 30 March 2015)
- (South Africa) Roger Sikhakhane (2 July 2015 – 7 Dec 2015)
- (South Africa) Dan Malesela (Dec 2015 – Sept 2017)
- (South Africa) Teboho Moloi (Sept 30 2017 – 3 March 2018)
- (South Africa) Vladislav Herić (3 March 2018 – 27 May 2018)
- (South Africa) Dan Malesela (27 May 2018 – 21 Aug 2018)
- (Lesotho) Lehlohonolo Seema (? – 23 Dec 2020)
- (Belgium) Luc Eymael (23 Dec 2020 – 24 Dec 2020)
- (South Africa) Dan Malesela (27 Dec 2020 – 4 April 2021)
- (South Africa) Gavin Hunt (7 July 2021 – July 2022)
- (South Africa) Daine Klate (July 2022 – Sept 2022)
- (South Africa) Morgan Mammila (June 2023 – Jan 2024)
- (South Africa) Thabo September and Kwanele Kopo (Jan 2024 – June 2025)
- (South Africa) Sinethemba Badela (June 2025 – Aug 2025)
- (Belgium) Luc Eymael (Aug 2025 – Oct 2025)
- (South Africa) Vusumuzi Vilakazi (Oct 2025 – present)

== Former technical directors ==
- (England) Mich d'Avray
- (Serbia) Vladislav Herić
