= List of South African sportspeople =

This is a list of South African sportspeople, organized by the sport which they are primarily known for.

== American football ==
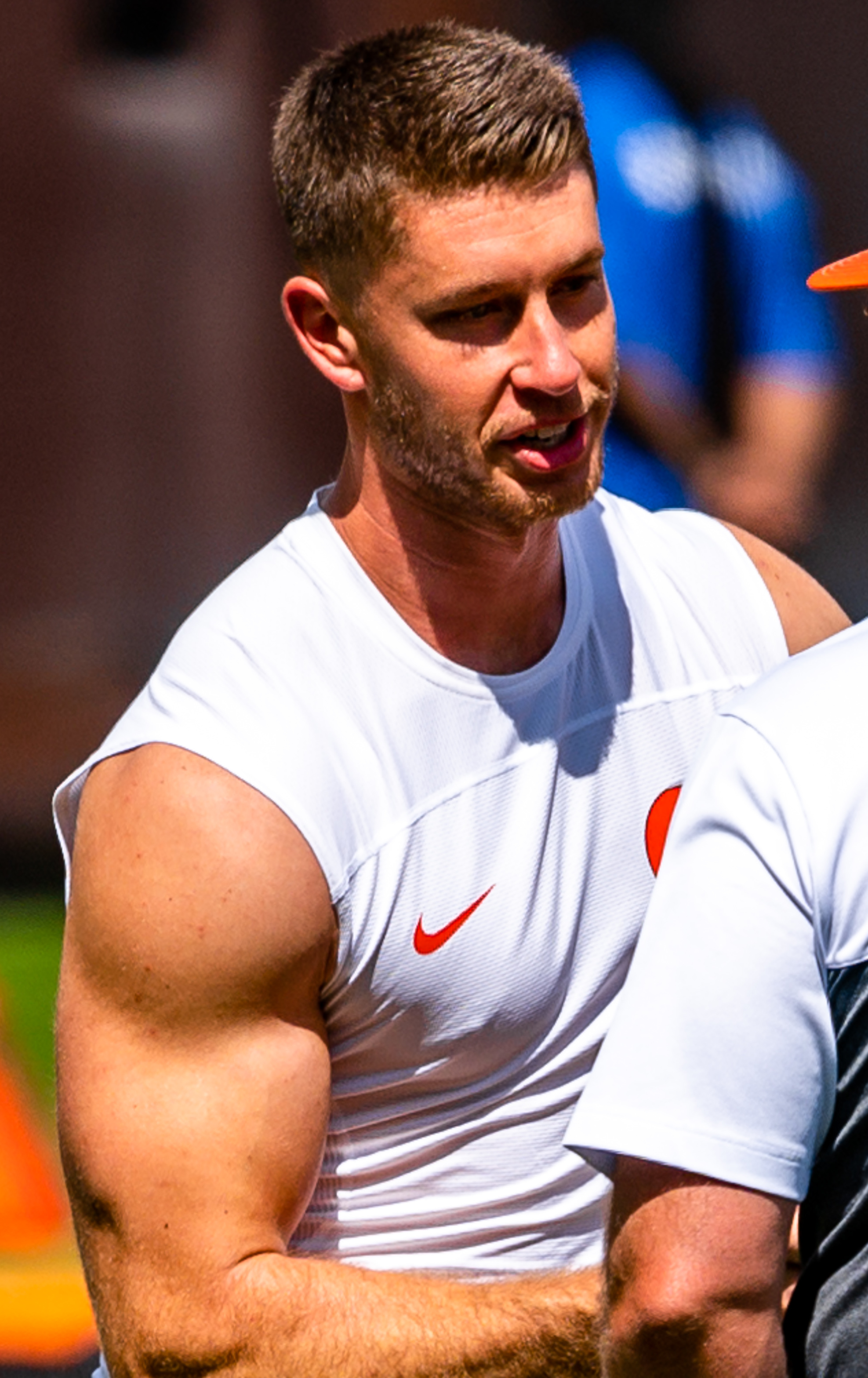
Greg Joseph

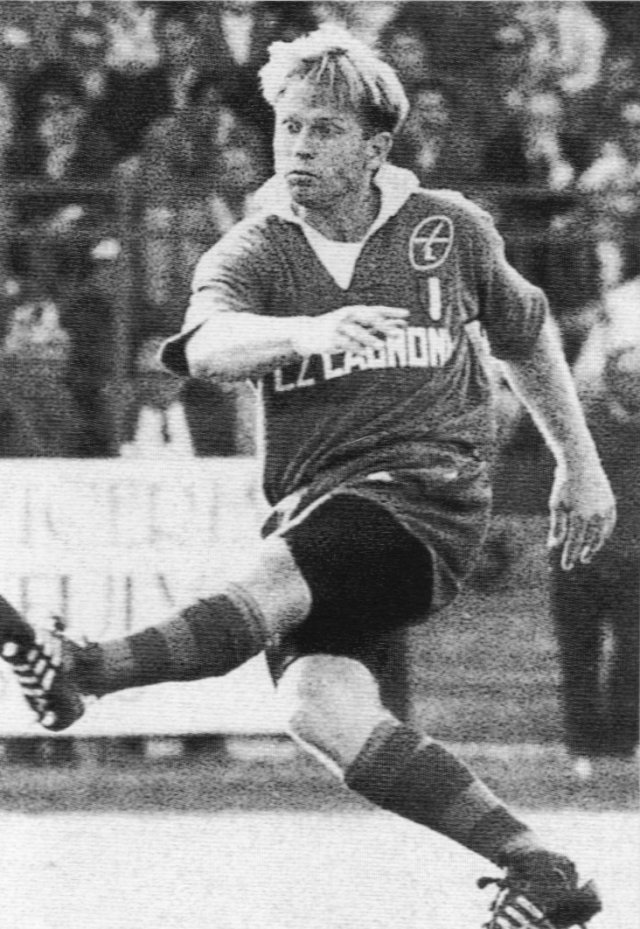
Naas Botha

- Gary Anderson, kicker for Pittsburgh, Philadelphia, San Francisco, Minnesota and Tennessee (born 1959)
- Ezra Butler, linebacker for the New York Jets (born 1984)
- Greg Joseph (born 1994), placekicker for the Tennessee Titans of the National Football League
- Jerome Pathon, wide receiver for Indianapolis, New Orleans and Atlanta (born 1975)
- Naas Botha, placekicker for Dallas Cowboys (born 1958)
- Dieter Eiselen, Offensive Lineman for the Chicago Bears and Houston Texans (born 1996)

== Athletics ==
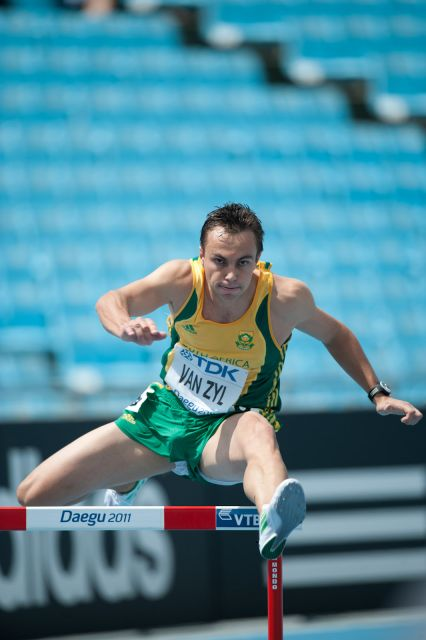
L. J. van Zyl

- Ewald Bonzet (1951–2016), track and road runner
- Okkert Brits (born 1973), pole-vaulter
- Zola Budd (born 1966), marathon and long-distance runner
- Hestrie Cloete (born 1978), high jumper
- Bruce Fordyce (born 1955), ultra-marathon runner
- Jacques Freitag (born 1982), high jumper
- Llewellyn Herbert (born 1977), 400 m hurdles, Olympic bronze medallist
- Frantz Kruger (born 1975), discus thrower
- Mbulaeni Mulaudzi (1980–2014), middle-distance runner, Olympic silver medallist
- Carle Pace (1918–2008), marathon runner, 400 m and 800 m record holder, cyclist
- Oscar Pistorius (born 1986), disabled runner
- Philip Rabinowitz (1904–2008), sprinter
- Hezekiél Sepeng (born 1974), middle-distance runner, Olympic silver medallist
- Josia Thugwane (born 1971), marathon runner, Olympic gold medallist
- Louis Jacob van Zyl (born 1985), 400 m hurdles, Commonwealth Games gold medallist

== Baseball ==
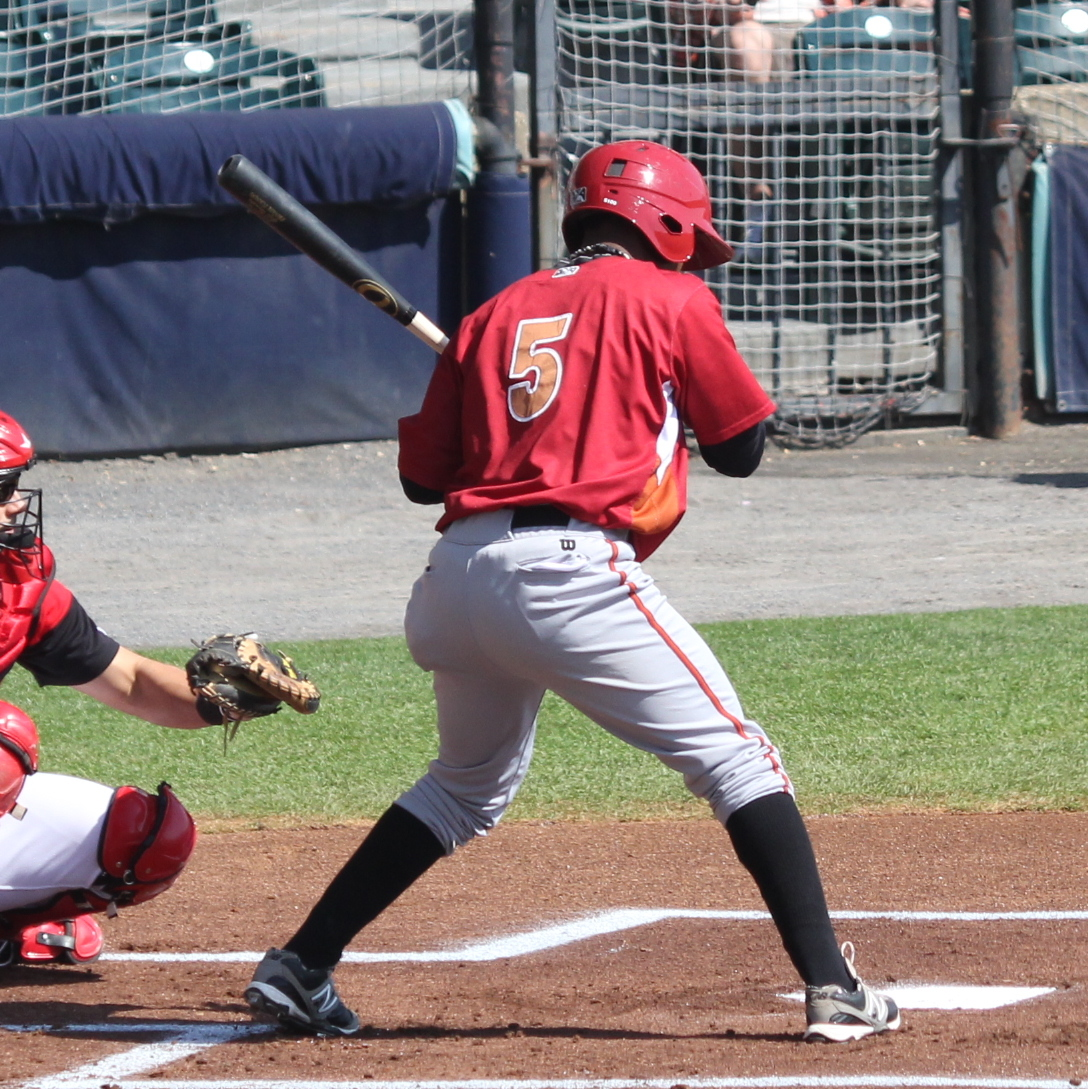
Gift Ngoepe

- David Lowery, pitcher (born 1942 in Johannesburg)
- Barry Armitage, pitcher (born 1979)
- Gavin Fingleson, second baseman (born 1979), silver medalist for Australia in 2004 Athens Olympics
- Gift Ngoepe, infielder (born 1990)

== Basketball ==
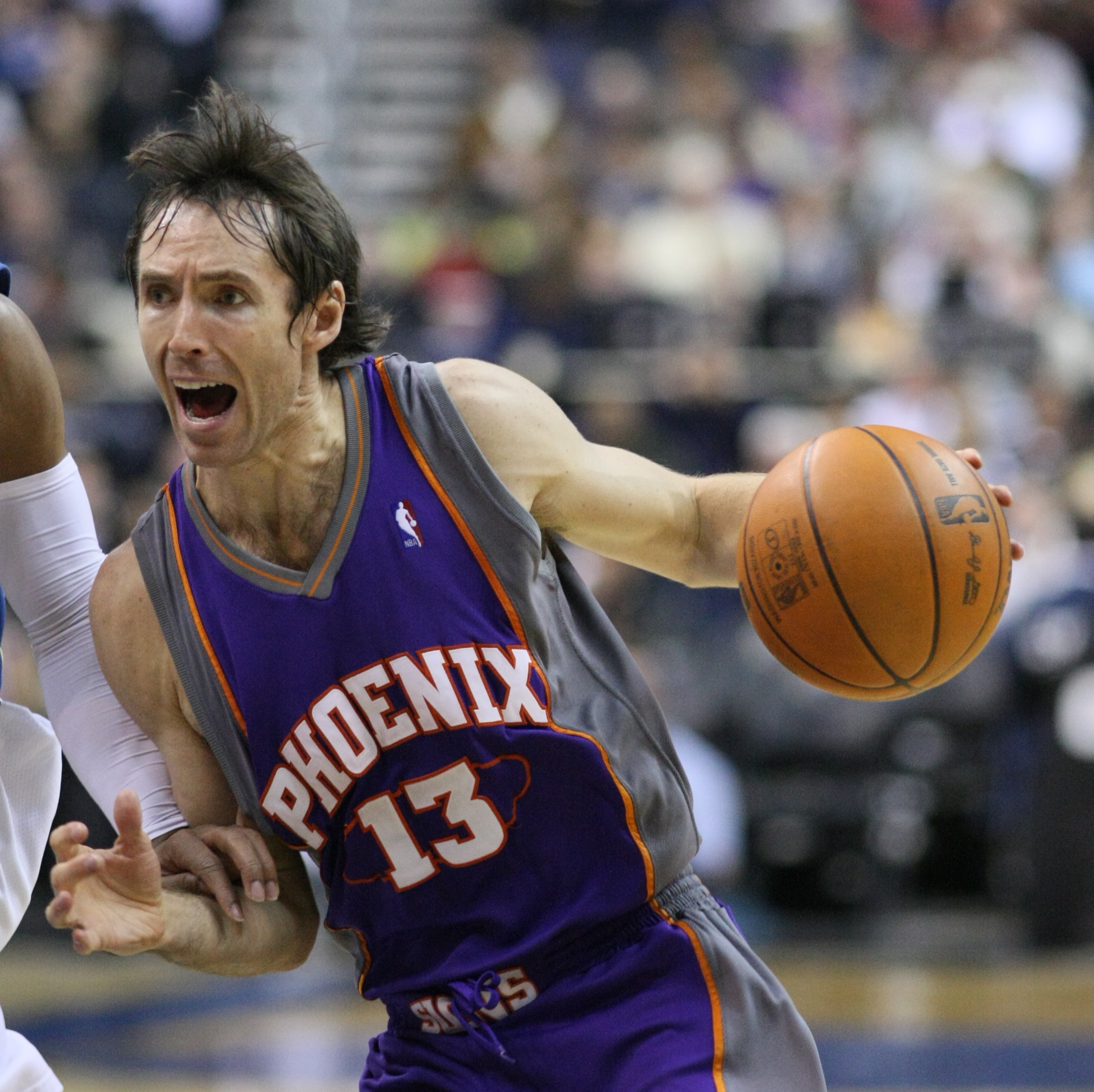
Steve Nash

- Steve Nash, point guard for the Los Angeles Lakers (born 1974)
- Thabo Sefolosha, shooting guard for Chicago and Oklahoma City (born 1984)

== Boxing ==
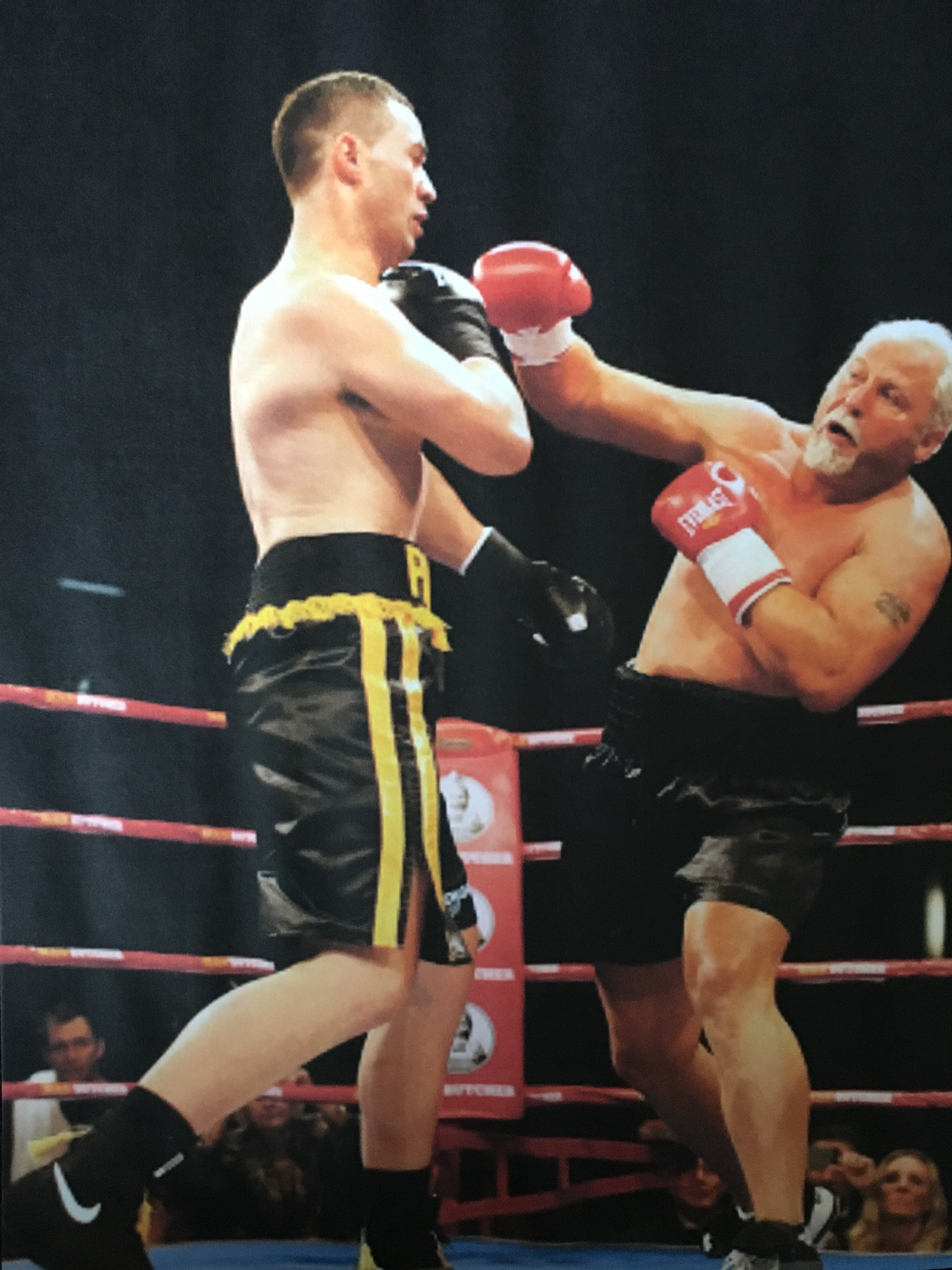
Botha (right) vs. Parker, 2013

- Cassius Baloyi, featherweight boxer (born 1974)
- Mike Bernardo, boxer, kickboxer, mixed martial arts fighter (born 1969)
- Francois Botha, heavyweight boxer (born 1968)
- Vuyani Bungu, IBF Super Bantamweight Champion 1994–1999 (born 1967)
- Gerrie Coetzee, World Boxing Association heavyweight champion (born 1955)
- Pierre Coetzer, heavyweight boxer, (born 1961)
- Nick Durandt, boxing trainer and manager (1963–2017)
- Pierre Fourie, middle and light heavyweight boxer (1943–1980)
- Thomas Hamilton-Brown, 1936 Summer Olympics lightweight (1916–1981)
- Kallie Knoetze, heavyweight boxer (born 1953)
- Lehlohonolo Ledwaba, IBF Super Bantamweight Champion 1999–2001 (born 1971)
- Elijah 'Tap Tap' Makhatini, middleweight boxer (born 1942)
- Masibulele Makepula, professional boxer (born 1973)
- "Baby" Jakes Matlala, junior flyweight champion (born 1962–2013)
- Brian Mitchell, WBA Super Featherweight Champion 1986–1991, IBF Super Featherweight Champion 1991
- Welcome Ncita, IBF Super Bantamweight Champion 1990–1992 (born 1965)
- Corrie Sanders, heavyweight boxer (1966–2012)
- Mike Schutte, heavyweight boxer (1950–2008)
- Mzukisi Sikali, flyweight boxer (1971–2005)
- Dingaan Thobela, Super Middleweight (born 1966)

== Canoeing ==
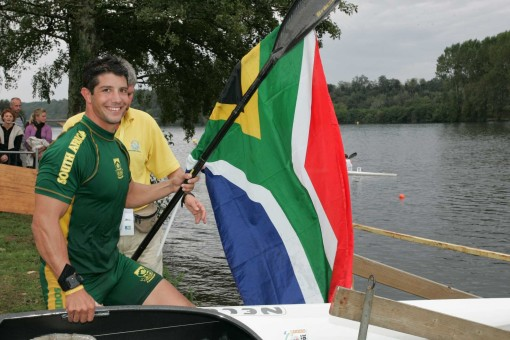
Shaun Rubenstein

- Bridgitte Hartley, 2012 Bronze Medal winner at the Olympics
- Graeme Pope-Ellis, 15 time Dusi canoe marathon winner
- Shaun Rubenstein (born 1983), canoer and World Marathon champion 2006

== Cricket ==
See also: South African Test cricketers, South African ODI cricketers, South African Twenty20 International cricketers, South African women Test cricketers

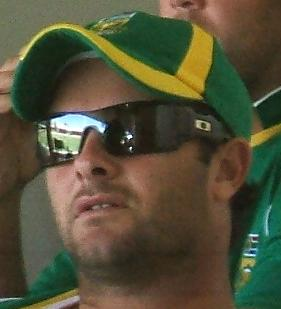
Mark Boucher

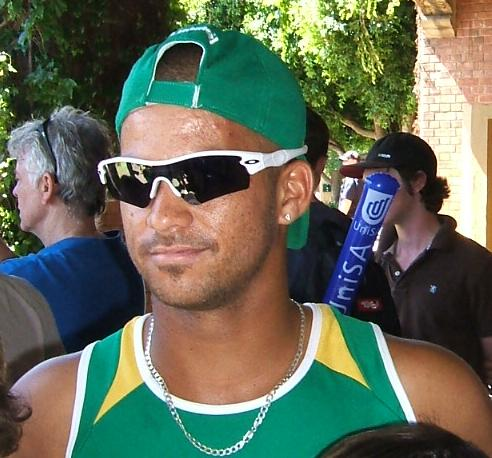
Jean-Paul Duminy

- Shafiek Abrahams (born 1968), right-arm spin bowler
- Warwick Abrahim (born 1990), first-class, List A, and T20 cricketer
- Clifford Abrams (1935–2002), first-class cricketer
- Paul Adams (born 1977), left-arm spin bowler
- Adam Bacher (born 1973), right-handed batsman
- Ali Bacher (born 1942), right-handed batsman and administrator
- Edgar John Barlow (1940–2005), right-arm fast bowler and coach
- Derrin Bassage (born 1978), left-handed batsman
- Christian Begg (born 1986), left-handed batsman
- Nicky Boje (born 1973), all-rounder
- Tertius Bosch (1966–2000), right-arm fast bowler
- Johan Botha (born 1982), right-arm spin bowler
- Mark Boucher (born 1976), wicket-keeper and right-handed batsman
- Charles Brockway (1907–1985), slow left-arm orthodox bowler
- David Callaghan (born 1965), all-rounder
- Jimmy Cook (born 1953), right-handed batsman
- Hansie Cronje (1969–2002), Proteas captain, all-rounder
- Daryll Cullinan (born 1967), right-handed batsman
- Basil D'Oliveira (1931–2011), right-handed batsman
- Dominic Daniels (born 1992), right-handed batsman
- Alan Dawson (born 1969), right-arm fast medium bowler
- AB de Villiers (born 1984), Proteas captain, wicket-keeper and right-handed batsman
- Faf du Plessis (born 1984), Proteas captain and right-handed batsman
- Fanie de Villiers (born 1964), right-arm fast medium bowler
- Matthew Dennington (born 1982), cricketer
- Boeta Dippenaar (born 1977), right-handed batsman
- Allan Donald (born 1966), right-arm fast bowler
- Jean-Paul Duminy (born 1984), left-handed batsman
- Luc Durandt (born 1989), right-arm medium bowler
- Zac Elkin (born 1991), wicketkeeper
- Clive Eksteen (born 1966), left-arm spin bowler
- Steve Elworthy (born 1965), right-arm fast medium bowler
- Dennis Gamsy (born 1940), Test wicket-keeper
- Herschelle Gibbs (born 1974), right-handed batsman
- Norman Gordon (1911–2014), fast bowler
- Tony Greig (1946–2012), right-handed batsman and commentator
- Francois Haasbroek (born 1987), right-handed batsman
- Andrew Hall (born 1975), all-rounder
- Nantie Hayward (born 1977), right-arm fast bowler
- Benjamin Hector (born 1979), right-handed batsman
- Claude Henderson (born 1972), left-arm spin bowler
- Omar Henry (born 1952), left-arm spin bowler
- Israel Hlengani (born 1988), left-handed batsman
- Andrew Hudson (born 1952), right-handed opening batsman
- Martin van Jaarsveld (born 1974), right-handed batsman
- Steven Jack (born 1970), right-arm fast medium bowler
- Jacques Kallis (born 1975), all-rounder
- Chad Keegan (born 1979), cricketer
- Justin Kemp (born 1977), all-rounder
- Jon Kent (born 1979), cricketer
- Gary Kirsten (born 1967), left-handed opening batsman
- Peter Kirsten (born 1955), right-handed batsman
- Lance Klusener (born 1971), all-rounder
- Garnett Kruger (born 1977), right-arm fast medium bowler
- Adrian Kuiper (born 1959), all-rounder
- Charl Langeveldt (born 1974), right-arm fast medium bowler
- Gerhardus Liebenberg (born 1972), right-handed batsman and wicket-keeper
- Allan Lamb (born 1954), right-hand batsman
- Craig Matthews (born 1965), right-arm fast medium bowler
- Neil McKenzie (born 1975), right-handed batsman
- Brian McMillan (born 1963), all-rounder
- Albie Morkel (born 1981), right-handed batsman
- Morné Morkel (born 1984), cricketer
- Brad Moses (born 1983), cricketer
- Victor Mpitsang (born 1980), right-arm fast medium bowler
- André Nel (born 1977), fast bowler
- Christo Niewoudt, cricketer
- Makhaya Ntini (born 1977), fast bowler
- Jonathan October (born 1974), right-arm medium bowler
- Justin Ontong (born 1980), right-arm spin bowler
- Hugh Page (born 1961), right arm fast bowler
- Robin Peterson (born 1979), left-arm spin bowler
- Kevin Pietersen (born 1980), right-handed batsman
- Graeme Pollock (born 1944), left-handed batsman
- Shaun Pollock (born 1973), Proteas captain, fast-medium bowler
- Nic Pothas (born 1973), right-handed batsman and wicket-keeper
- Ashwell Prince (born 1977), left-handed batsman
- Meyrick Pringle (born 1966), right-arm fast medium swing bowler
- Andrew Puttick (born 1980), cricketer
- Jonty Rhodes (born 1969), right-handed batsman
- Clive Rice (1949–2015), all-rounder
- Dave Richardson (born 1959), right-handed batsman and wicketkeeper
- Jacques Rudolph (born 1981), left-handed batsman
- Mark Rushmere (born 1965), right-handed batsman
- Brett Schultz (born 1970), left-arm fast bowler
- Lawrence Seeff (born 1959), batsmen
- Warren Shankland (born 1987), cricketer
- Graeme Smith (born 1981), Proteas captain, batsman
- Greg Smith (born 1971), cricketer
- Percy Sonn (1949–2007), sixth president of the International Cricket Council, first ICC president from Africa
- Errol Stewart (born 1969), right-handed batsman and wicket-keeper
- Dale Steyn (born 1983), right-arm fast bowler
- Rudi Steyn (born 1967), cricketer
- Pieter Strydom (born 1969), cricketer
- Fred Susskind (1891–1957), Test batsman
- Pat Symcox (born 1960), right-arm spin bowler
- Roger Telemachus (born 1973), right-arm fast medium bowler
- David Terbrugge (born 1977), right-arm fast medium bowler
- Leslie Wenzler (born 1962), first-class cricketer
- Kepler Wessels (born 1957), Proteas captain, left-handed batsman
- Henry Williams (born 1967), right-arm fast medium bowler
- Charl Willoughby (born 1974), cricketer
- James Wood (born 1985), wicket-keeper
- Mandy Yachad (born 1960), cricketer
- Monde Zondeki (born 1982), right-arm fast bowler

== Cycling ==
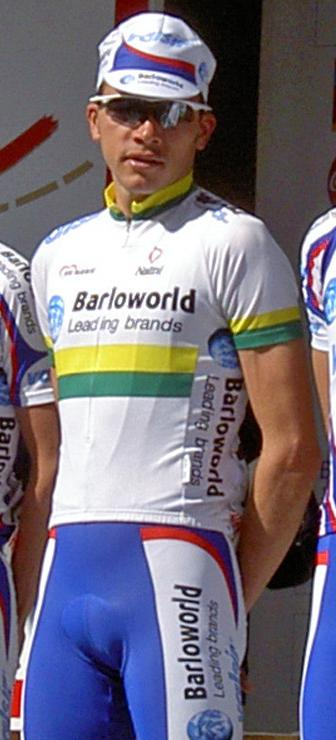
Ryan Cox

- John-Lee Augustyn (born 1986)
- Ryan Cox (1979–2007)
- David George (born 1976)
- Robbie Hunter (born 1977)
- Daryl Impey (born 1984)
- Laurens Meintjes (1868–1941)
- Burry Stander (1987–2013)
- Carla Swart (1987–2011)

== Golf ==
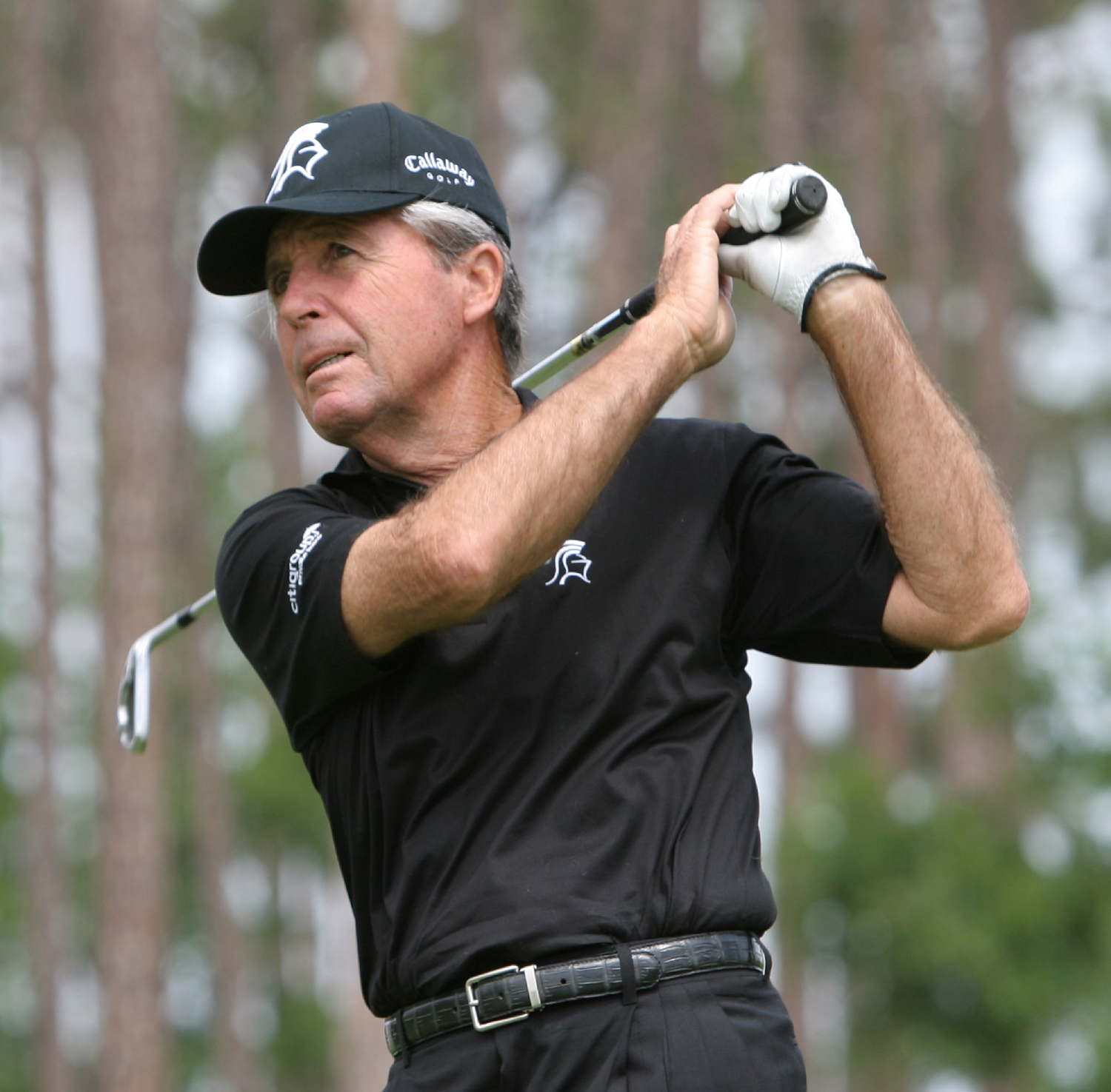
Gary Player

- Ernie Els (born 1969)
- Retief Goosen (born 1969)
- Trevor Immelman (born 1979)
- Gary Player (born 1936)
- Rory Sabbatini (born 1976)
- Charl Schwartzel (born 1984)
- Sewsunker "Papwa" Sewgolum (1930–1978)
- David Frost (born 1959)

== Ice hockey ==
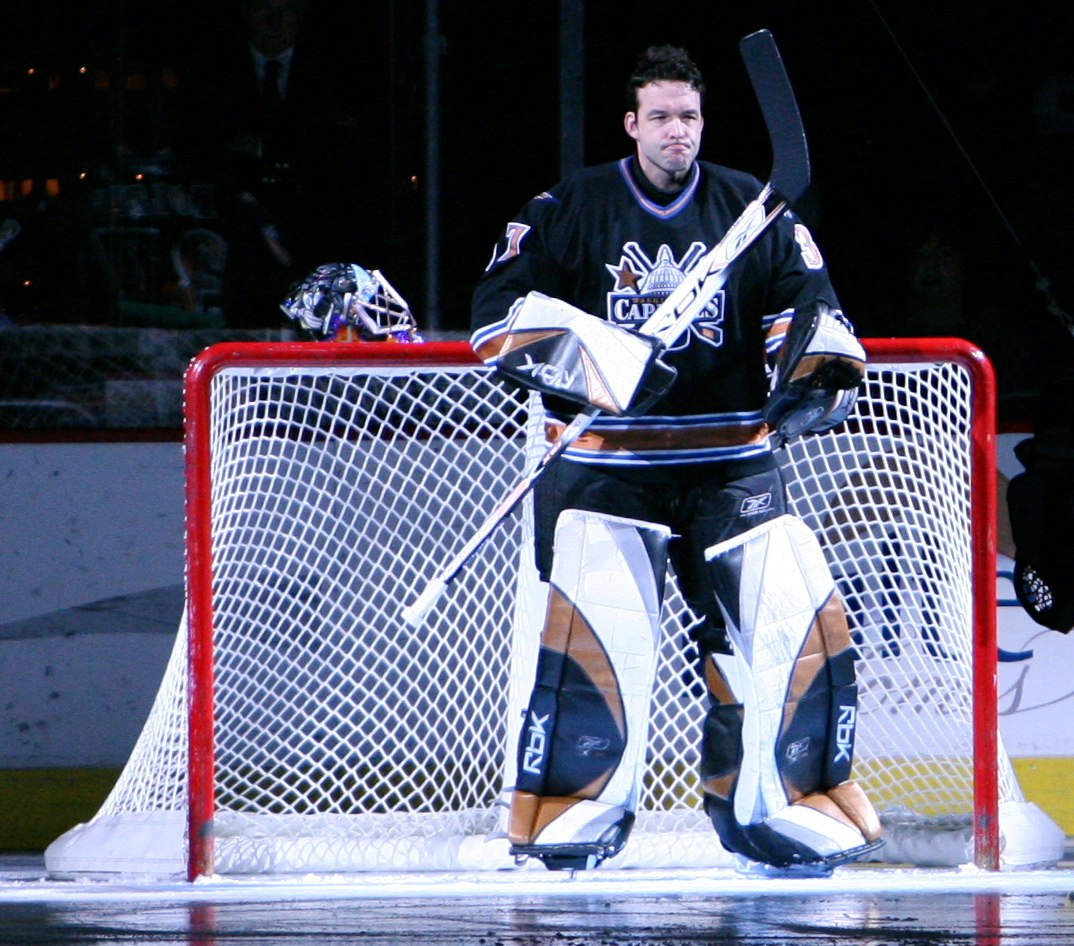
Olaf Kölzig

- Rudi Ball (1911–1975), German-South African Hall of Fame ice hockey player
- Olaf Kölzig, goaltender (born 1970)

== Ice skaters ==
- Jenna-Anne Buys
- Michaela du Toit
- Gareth Echardt
- Lauren Henry
- Shirene Human
- Gwyn Jones
- Lejeanne Marais
- Marcelle Matthews
- Abigail Pietersen
- Justin Pietersen
- Dino Quattrocecere
- Marion Sage

== Motorsports ==
See also: South African racecar drivers and Formula One drivers

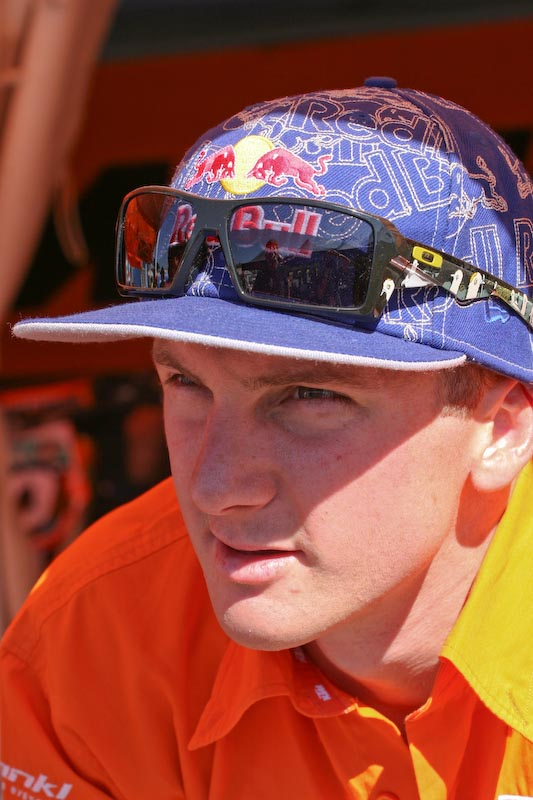
Tyla Rattray

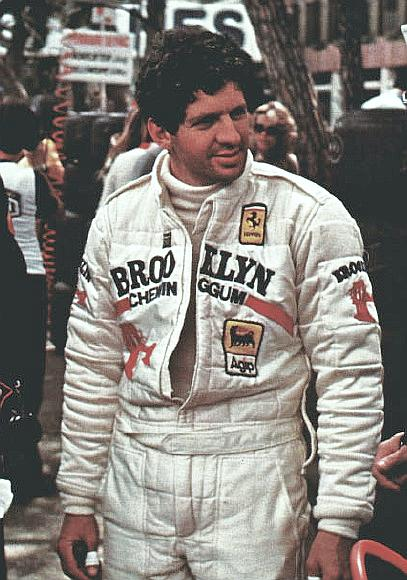
Jody Scheckter

- Greg Albertyn, World and American Motocross Champion
- Rory Byrne, racing car designer for Ferrari and others
- Dave Charlton, Formula One driver
- Giniel de Villiers, rally raid driver, 2009 Dakara Rally winner
- Jan Hettema, five times SA Rally Drivers Champion and Springbok cyclist
- Grant Langston, World and American Motocross Champion
- Gordon Murray, Grand Prix car designer (born 1946)
- Tyla Rattray, World Motocross Champion
- Ian Scheckter, Formula One driver (brother of Jody Scheckter)
- Jody Scheckter, 1979 Formula One world champion (born 1950)
- Tomas Scheckter, South Africa, Indy Racing League driver
- Wayne Taylor, sports car driver and team owner, 1994 IMSA GT champion
- Sarel van der Merwe, rally and racing driver, multiple SA Rally Drivers Champion.

== Netball ==
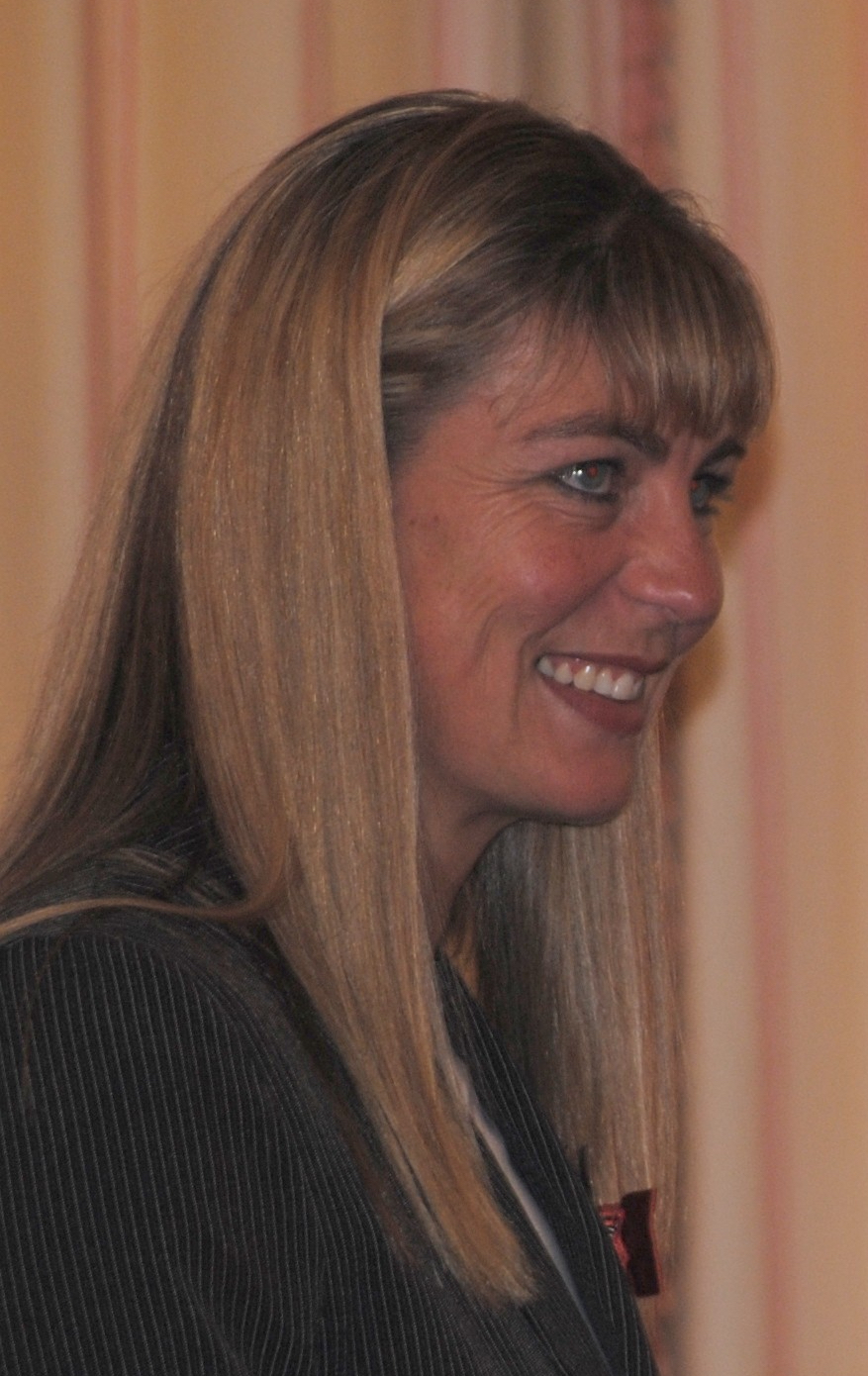
Irene van Dyk

- Irene van Dyk, played for South Africa and New Zealand, most capped international player of all time (born 1972)
- Leana De Bruin, played for South Africa and New Zealand (born 1977)

== Rugby ==
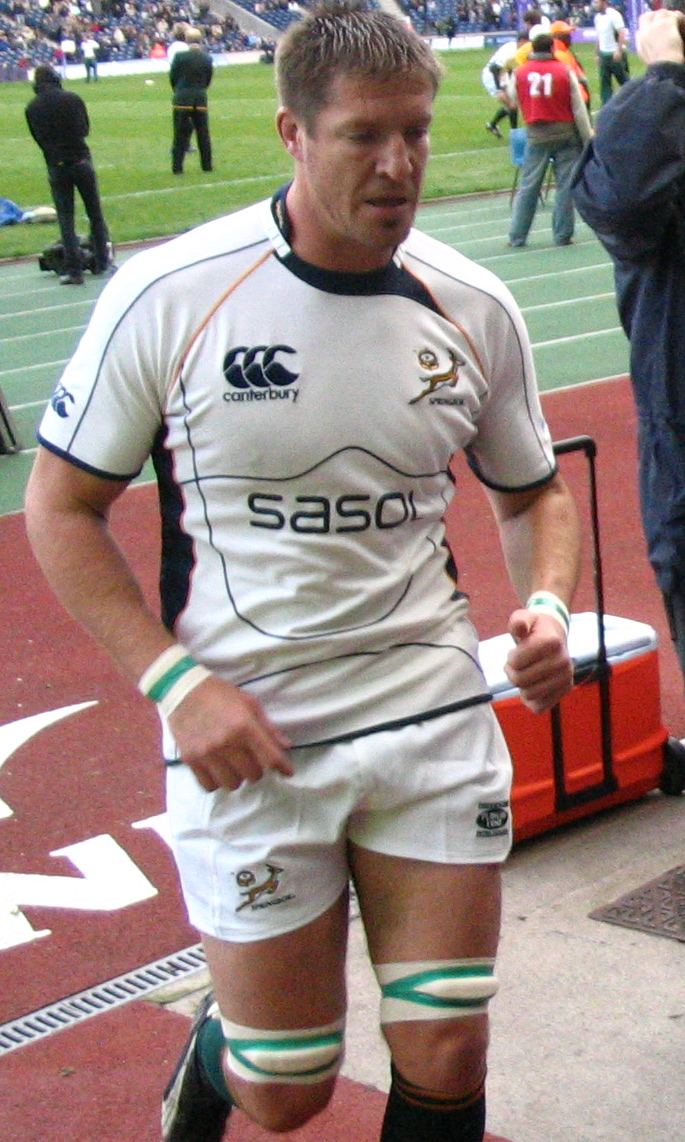
Bakkies Botha

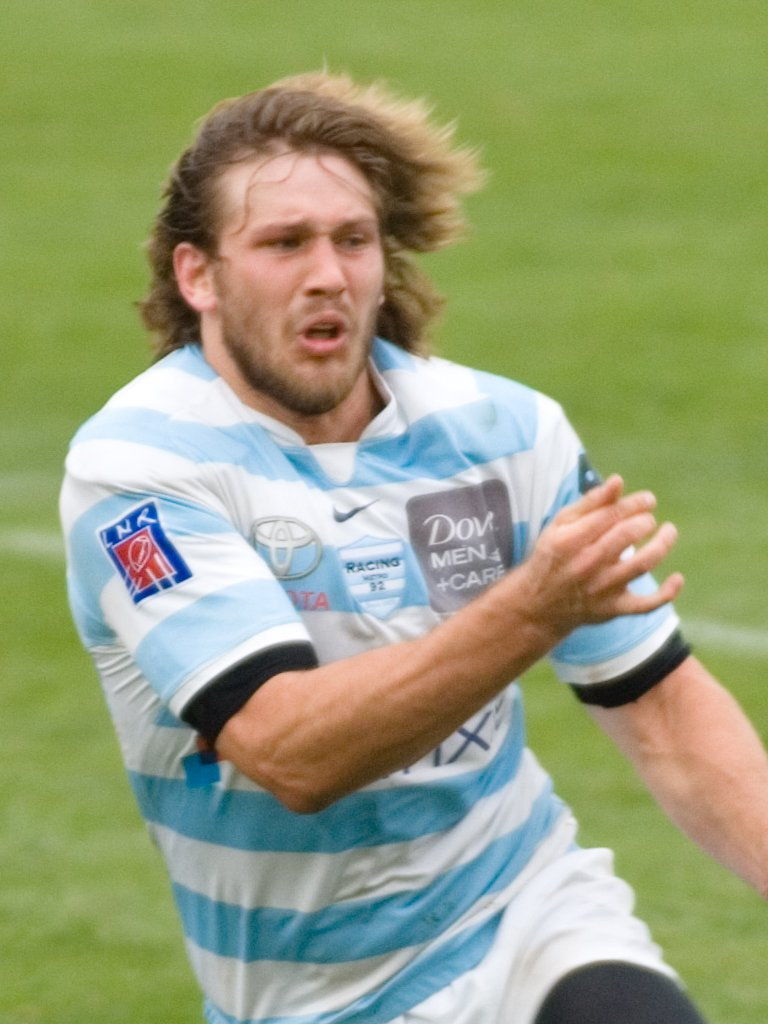
François Steyn

- Louis Babrow, national team, centre (1915–2004)
- Bakkies Botha, Springbok, lock (born 1979)
- Naas Botha, Springbok, flyhalf and TV presenter (born 1958)
- Schalk Burger, Springbok, flank (born 1983)
- Jordan Chait, Tel Aviv Heat, fly-half (born 1997)
- Kitch Christie, Springbok coach (1940–1998)
- Danie Craven, Springbok, scrumhalf and administrator (1910–1994)
- Jean de Villiers, Springbok, centre and wing (born 1981)
- Peter de Villiers, Springbok coach (born 1957)
- Morne du Plessis, Springbok, eight man (born 1949)
- Frik du Preez, Springbok, lock/flank (born 1935)
- Os du Randt, Springbok, prop (born 1972)
- Okey Geffin, forward, national team (1921–2004)
- Danie Gerber, Springbok, centre (born 1958)
- Gerrie Germishuys, Springbok, wing (born 1949)
- Bryan Habana, Springbok, wing (born 1983)
- Wiehahn Herbst, Tel Aviv Heat, prop (born 1988)
- Siyamthanda Kolisi, Cell C Sharks, loose forward (born 1991)
- Butch James, Springbok, flyhalf (born 1979)
- Joe Kaminer, national team, centre (1934–2021)
- Sarah Levy (born 1995), South African-born American Olympic bronze medalist, rugby union and rugby sevens player; great-granddaughter of Louis Babrow
- Shawn Lipman, U.S. national team, flanker (born 1964)
- Victor Matfield, Springbok, lock (born 1977)
- Alan Menter, national team, flyhalf (born 1941)
- Percy Montgomery, Springbok, fullback (born 1974)
- Cecil Moss, national team, wing (1925–2017)
- Sydney Nomis, national team, wing/centre (1901–1962)
- Caylib Oosthuizen, Tel Aviv Heat, loosehead prop (born 1989)
- Bennie Osler, Springbok, fly-half (1901–1962)
- Francois Pienaar, Springbok, flank (born 1967)
- Jeremy Reingold, swimmer and rugby player
- Myer Rosenblum, South Africa national team, flanker (1907–2002)
- John Smit, Springbok, hooker (born 1978)
- Fred Smollan, national team, flanker (1908–1998)
- François Steyn, Springbok, flyhalf/fullback (born 1987)
- Joel Stransky, Springbok, flyhalf, kicked winning points in 1995 Rugby World Cup, played by Scott Eastwood in Invictus (born 1967)
- Gary Teichmann, Springbok, number 8 (born 1967)
- Jamba Ulengo, Tel Aviv Heat, winger (born 1990)
- Harry Vermaas, hooker (born 1984)
- Joost van der Westhuizen, Springbok, scrum-half (1971–2017)
- Jurie van Vuuren, Tel Aviv Heat, lock/flanker (born 1993)
- Jake White, Springbok coach (born 1963)
- Chester Williams, Springbok, wing (1970–2019)
- Morris Zimerman, wing (1911–1992)

== Soccer ==
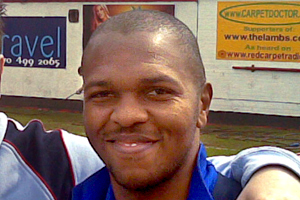
Quinton Fortune

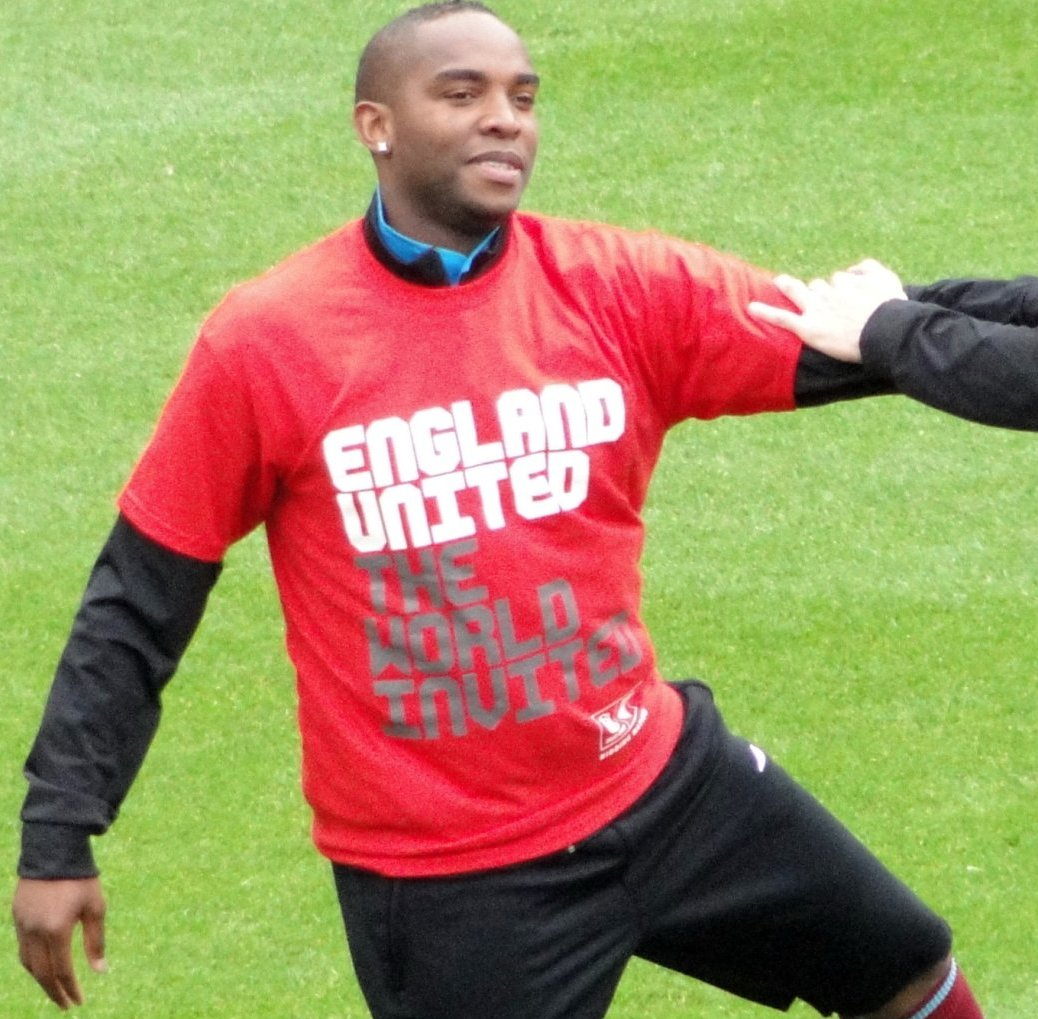
Benni McCarthy

- Jonathan Armogam (born 1981), midfielder and striker
- Gary Bailey (born 1958), goalkeeper for England and Manchester United
- Marawaan Bantam (born 1977), midfielder
- Shaun Bartlett (born 1972), striker
- Arthur Bunch (1909–1973), inside right forward
- Rodney Bush (born 1955), defender
- Nelson "Teenage" Dladla (born 1954), midfielder
- Kagisho Dikgacoi (born 1984), midfielder for Fulham and Crystal Palace
- Cliff Durandt (1940–2002), winger
- Mark Fish (born 1974), defender for Bolton Wanderers, Charlton Athletic and Jomo Cosmos
- Quinton Fortune (born 1977), midfielder and defender for Manchester United
- Bevan Fransch (born 1986), defender
- Dean Furman (born 1988), midfielder for Oldham Athletic
- Siboniso Gaxa (born 1984), defender for Lierse S.K.
- Gordon Gilbert (born 1982), central defender
- Ryan Hodgskin (born 1977), right back
- Junior Khanye (born 1985), winger
- Doctor Khumalo (born 1967), midfielder
- Cys Kurland (fl. 1947), player
- Bonginkosi Macala (born 1985), winger
- Collen Makgopela (born 1985), striker
- Lesley Manyathela (1981–2003), Bafana Bafana and Orlando Pirates striker
- Wayne Matle (born 1988), right-back
- Peter Matshitse (born 1971), defender
- Masonwabe Maseti (born 1987), midfielder
- Goodman Mazibuko (born 1975), midfielder
- Matome Mathiane (born 1988), Lamontville Golden Arrows captain, defender
- Benni McCarthy (born 1977), striker
- Jorry Merahe (born 1980), midfielder
- Senzo Meyiwa (1982–2014), Bafana Bafana and Orlando Pirates captain, goalkeeper
- Thandokuhle Mkhonza (born 1980), goalkeeper
- Aaron Mokoena (born 1980), defender, most capped player on the national team
- Tebogo Monyai (born 1979), defender
- Ditheko Mototo (born 1980), defender
- Sydney Nkalanga, footballer
- John Bheki Nkambule (born 1981), midfielder
- Siyabonga Nomvete (born 1977), striker
- Innocent Ntsume (born 1980), midfielder
- Steven Pienaar (born 1982), Everton F.C. midfielder
- Lucas Radebe (born 1969), Bafana Bafana captain, defender
- Siyabonga Sangweni (born 1981), South African football defender
- Itumeleng Sekwale (born 1983), footballer
- Clint Sipho Sephadi (born 1973), midfielder
- Ntokozo Sikhakhane (born 1983), midfielder
- Bamuza Sono (born 1980), midfielder
- Eric Bhamuza Sono (1937–1964), Orlando Pirates captain
- Jomo Sono (born 1955), midfielder and coach
- Jacob Tshisevhe (born 1969), defender

== Surfing ==
Shaun Tomson

- Grant Baker, winner of the Mavericks Big Wave contest in California
- Chris Bertish, 2009 Mavericks Big Wave Surf winner
- Sean Holmes, 2000 Red Bull Big Wave Africa winner
- Martin Potter, 1989 world champ (born 1965)
- Jordy Smith, winner of the 2010 and 2011 ASP World Tour Billabong Pro
- Shaun Tomson, former world champ (born 1955)
- John Whitmore, father of South African surfing (1929–2001)

== Swimming ==
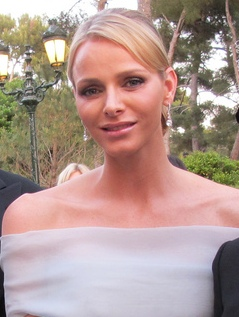
Charlene Wittstock

- Chad le Clos, Olympic gold medallist (born 1992)
- Natalie du Toit, disabled swimmer (born 1984)
- Lyndon Ferns, Olympic gold medallist (born 1983)
- Penny Heyns, breaststroke, Olympic gold medallist (born 1974)
- Karen Muir, backstroke, youngest world record holder in any sport in 1965 at 12 years old (1952–2013)
- Ryk Neethling, freestyle, Olympic gold medallist (born 1977)
- Sarah Poewe, Olympic bronze medallist (4x100 medley relay) (born 1983)
- Jeremy Reingold, swimmer and rugby player
- Roland Mark Schoeman, freestyle, Olympic gold medallist (born 1980)
- Darian Townsend, Olympic gold medallist (born 1984)
- Charlene Wittstock, backstroke swimmer (born 1978)

== Tennis ==
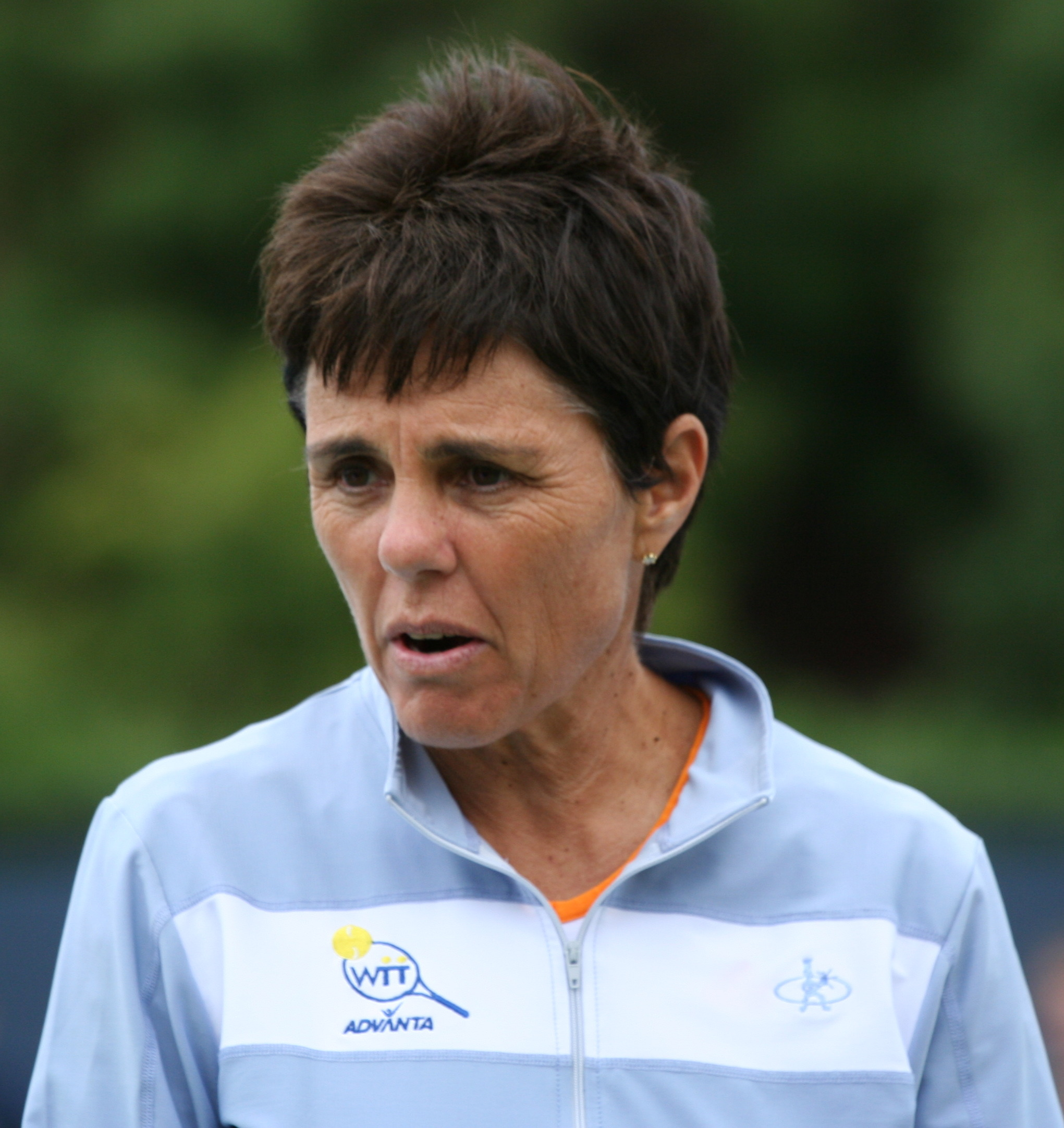
Ilana Kloss

- Neil Broad, seven ATP tour doubles titles and Olympic doubles silver medallist (born 1966)
- Amanda Coetzer, 1998 Family Circle Cup (born 1971)
- Kevin Curren, four Grand Slam doubles titles (born 1958)
- Cliff Drysdale, player and television commentator (born 1941)
- Esmé Emmanuel, tennis player (born 1947)
- Roger Federer, holds both Swiss and South African citizenship (born 1981)
- Wayne Ferreira, 1996 Canada Masters, 2000 Eurocard Open and Olympic doubles silver medallist (born 1971)
- Ian Froman, South African-born Israeli tennis player and patron
- Marlene Gerson (born 1940), player
- Bob Hewitt, men's doubles champion: Wimbledon, French and US Open; convicted rapist (born 1940)
- Ilana Kloss, won 1976 US Open Women's Doubles (w/Linky Boshoff), highest world doubles ranking # 1 (born 1956)
- Johan Kriek, 1981 and '82 Australian Open champion (born 1958)
- Julian Krinsky, American, former South African, tennis player
- Syd Levy, player; competed at Wimbledon, the French Championships, the U.S. Open, and Davis Cup, and won a silver medal at the Maccabiah Games (born 1922)
- Rod Mandelstam (born 1942), South African tennis player
- Frew McMillan (born 1942), men's doubles champion at Wimbledon, French and US Open
- Jack Saul, South African-Israeli tennis player
- David Schneider (born 1955), South African-Israeli tennis player
- Abe Segal (1930–2016), tennis player, competed in all four Grand Slams and in Davis Cup

== Triathlon ==
- Conrad Stoltz (born 1973)
- Dan Hugo (born 1985)

== Other sports ==
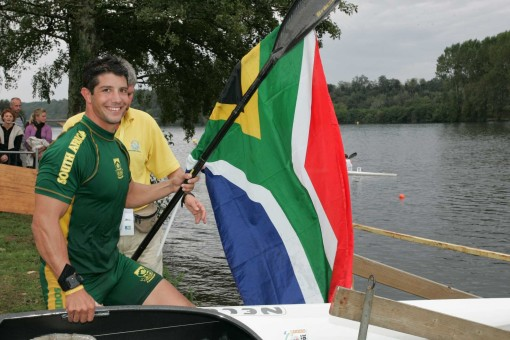
Shaun Rubenstein

- Gonda Betrix (born 1943), South Africa at the 1992 Summer Olympics in individual show jumping
- William Ronald Eland (1923-2003), weightlifter
- Dricus du Plessis (born 1994), professional mixed martial artist and former UFC Middleweight Champion

== See also ==
- Olympic gold medalists for South Africa
- Lists of sportspeople
- List of flag bearers for South Africa at the Olympics
