= Sherwyn Naicker =

South African soccer player

Personal information
- Date of birth: 26 March 1991 (age 35)
- Position: Goalkeeper

Youth career
- SuperSport United

Senior career*
Years	Team	Apps	(Gls)
2011–2012	SuperSport United	1	(0)
2012–2014	Tshakhuma Tsha Madzivhandila	18	(0)
2014–2016	Jomo Cosmos	55	(0)
2016–2017	Tshakhuma Tsha Madzivhandila	30	(0)
2017–2019	Lamontville Golden Arrows	0	(0)
Total		104	(0)
- * Club domestic league appearances and goals

Sherwyn Naicker (born 26 March 1991) is a South African former professional soccer player who played as a goalkeeper.

== Career ==
Naicker has played for SuperSport United, Tshakhuma Tsha Madzivhandila, Jomo Cosmos and Lamontville Golden Arrows.

He retired from football, beginning work as a sales executive for a beverage company in September 2019. In May 2020 he accused Jomo Cosmos manager Jomo Sono and player Bamuza Sono of falsely accusing him of match fixing and ruining his reputation. The claims were denied by Jomo Sono, who threatened Naicker with legal action.

In July 2020 Naicker was reported to be close to returning to professional football.
