= Nkambule =

Nkambule is a surname. Notable people with the surname include:

- John Bheki Nkambule (born 1981), South African footballer
- Tibati Nkambule (died 1895), Queen Regent and Indlovukati of Swaziland from 1889 until 1894
