= Hodgskin =

Hodgskin is a surname. Notable people with the surname include:

- Natalie Hodgskin (born 1976), Australian softball player
- Ryan Hodgskin (born 1977), South African footballer
- Thomas Hodgskin (1787–1869), English socialist writer

== See also ==
- Hodgkin
