= Macala =

Macala may refer to:

- Macala, a settlement in Tibet

People

- Macala (footballer) (1921–1992), Spanish footballer
- Milan Máčala (born 1943), Czech football coach
- Bonginkosi Macala (born 1985), South African footballer
