= Fred Smollan =

South African rugby union player

- Born: Frederick Cecil Smollan; 20 August 1908 Uitenhage, Cape Colony
- Died: 8 February 1998 (aged 89) Johannesburg, South Africa
- School: Grey High School, Muir College
- Occupation: businessman

Rugby union career
- Position: Flanker
Amateur team(s)
Years	Team	Apps	(Points)
1930–38	Wanderers RFC		
Provincial / State sides
Years	Team	Apps	(Points)
1929–30	Eastern Province		
1930–39	Transvaal		
International career
Years	Team	Apps	(Points)
1933	South Africa	3	(0)

Official website
- www.smollan.co.za

Frederick Cecil Smollan (20 August 1908 – 8 February 1998, Johannesburg) was a South Africa international rugby union player.

== Career history ==
Fred Smollan was born in Uitenhage, South Africa in 1908 to David Smollan and Mathilda Goldwater, the second of four brothers. Educated at Muir College and later Grey High School, Smollan was only the second Jew to represent South Africa in rugby union, after Morris Zimerman. Smollan played club rugby for Wanderers RFC, regional rugby for Eastern Province and Transvaal and played three times for South Africa in 1933.

His three internationals were all against Australia on the team's 1933 tour of South Africa. Although he would receive no further caps, he faced international opponents again, facing the 1938 British Lions as part of the Transvaal team. Transvaal defeated the Lions 16–9, with Smollan scoring one of the tries.

In 1931 he set up a business Smollan Holdings, initially as a sales agency. With the outbreak of World War II he served in North Africa. He married Molly Amelia Raphaely in Johannesburg in 1943 and after the war returned to run his business which he built into a public company. Smollan and Molly had two children, Doug (b. 1945) and Katherine (b. 1948). Smollan Holdings expanded to become the Smollan Group, a multinational company which now employs 34,000 people and outsources marketing services across the world. Smollan remained as its chairman until shortly before his death.

== Honours ==
In 2024, at the South African Jewish Board of Deputies' 120th anniversary gala dinner, he was honoured among 100 remarkable Jewish South Africans who have contributed to South Africa. The ceremony included speeches from Chief Rabbi Ephraim Mirvis, and Smollan was honoured among other rugby union players such as Joel Stransky, Cecil Moss and Alan Menter.

== See also ==
- List of select Jewish rugby union players
