= Muir College =

Coordinates: 33°44′04″S 25°25′13″E

Location
- Sir Thomas Muir Drive, Vanes Estate; Kariega, Eastern Cape; South Africa

Information
- School type: All-boys public school
- Motto: Nec Pluribus Impar (Second to None)
- Established: 12 July 1822; 204 years ago
- Sister school: Riebeek College Girls' High School
- School district: District 9
- School number: 041 966 1147
- Headmaster: Mr D Francis
- Staff: 100 full-time
- Grades: 4–12
- Gender: Male
- Age: 9 to 18
- Enrollment: 730 boys
- Language: English
- Schedule: 07:30 - 14:00
- Campus: Urban Campus
- Campus type: Suburban
- Houses: Dugmore; Inggs; Sutherland
- Song: Let us sing to the Muir
- Nickname: Muirites
- Rival: Gill College; Graeme College; Grey High School; St. Andrew's College
- Yearbook: The Muirite
- School fees: R24,350 (Tuition); R50,700 (Boarding)
- Feeder schools: College Hill Preparatory
- Alumni: Old Muirites

Muir College is a semi-private English medium high school for boys situated in the suburb of Vanes Estate in Kariega (previously Uitenhage) (Nelson Mandela Bay Metropolitan Municipality) in the Eastern Cape province of South Africa. Muir caters for pupils from Grades 4 to 12. It is one of the oldest schools in South Africa (SA), having been established in 1822.

== History ==
Muir College is the oldest boys' high school in South Africa, tracing its origins back to 1822 when a Scottish educationalist, James Rose Innes MA (King's College, Aberdeen), established Uitenhage's first Free School (entirely funded by the Cape Government) in Cuyler Street on 12 October, with 60 pupils. Admission was open to all children, irrespective of gender, ethnicity or economic status, and by 1829 enrolment had increased to 167. Innes resigned in 1830 to take up the position of Professor of Mathematics at the South African College in Cape Town, and in 1839 became the first Superintendent-General for Education in the Cape.

In 1865 the Uitenhage Proprietary School – a private, fee-paying school - opened in Uitenhage with the Rev Dr Robert Templeton MA (Glasgow) as its first headmaster. In 1873 the Government School and the Proprietary School amalgamated to form the Uitenhage Undenominational Public School, and in 1875 the school moved to new purpose-built premises on the corner of Cannon Street and Park Avenue. In 1892 the school's name was changed to the Muir Academy in honour of the new Superintendent-General of Education in the Cape, Dr (later Sir) Thomas Muir MA, HonLLD (Glasgow).

In 1904 a new, red-brick school building designed by celebrated architect William White-Cooper was opened on the Park Avenue site by Dr[doctor] Muir. By this time the school was officially 'Muir High School', but by 1907 it was universally known as 'Muir College'. In 1962, because of growing numbers and lack of space, the college was split into three. The Sub A, Sub B and Standard 1 (Grades 1 - 3) classes moved to the former Riebeek College premises on the corner of Church Street and Cannon Street, where they joined their former Riebeek College contempoaries in the new College Hill Preparatory School, while Standards 2 to 5 (Grades 4 to 7) became Muir College Boys' Primary School (housed in buildings on the south side of Cannon Street), and Muir College Boys' High School remained in the red-brick buildings in Park Avenue.

In 1987 the high school moved to a new, very spacious campus in Vanes Estate, and Muir Primary moved into the Park Avenue buildings. The Senior and Primary schools were reunited in 1994 and currently occupy the Vanes Estate site where there are extensive sports facilities as well as boarding facilities for approximately 100 pupils.

Origin of the School Badge: The school badge had its origin in the Proprietary School, and shows the rampant lion of Scotland in the left quadrant, honouring the first (Scottish) headmaster. Facing it is a cross taken from Uitenhage's coat of arms (from the family crest of the founder of Uitenhage, General J Uitenhage de Mist.) Below is a Xhosa warrior, representing the Eastern Cape, which also appears on the seal of the proposed Eastern Cape Colony. Although the division of the Cape Colony into East and West did not occur, a seal was prepared and is on view in the Cuyler Manor Museum. The last quadrant shows an anchor, representing the Cape Colony.

== School motto ==
"Nec Pluribus Impar", Latin for "Second to None"

== School song ==
Stand and sing for auld lang syne,
Shout till the rafters ring.
Stand and sing our song once again,
Let every loyal heart now sing.
Then think of all the happy hours,
Think of the careless days,
Think of all who went before us,
Yet linger in our thoughts always.

Let us sing to the Muir,
To the school with the glorious memories,
To the men of the past, and the name they have handed down to us;
To the life and the strife, in the games that are stirring and calling us;
Carry on! Carry on! Carry on the good name of the Muir!

So - Stand and sing for auld lang syne,
Shout till the rafters ring.
Stand and sing our song once again,
Let every loyal heart now sing.
Then think of all the happy hours,
Think of the careless days,
Think of all who went before us,
Yet linger in our thoughts always

== Rugby at Muir ==
Photographic evidence of rugby at Muir College exists from as early as 1893, while Grey High School record their first ever game as played against the Muir Academy in 1894. Headmaster John Mitchell had recorded in his diary on the 13th of April 1893 that “a meeting of pupils to decide on the football club was held.” Unfortunately this teething period of rugby came to an abrupt end in 1897 when new headmaster John Sutherland introduced soccer as the winter sport. Rugby was reintroduced in only 1923, and performances climaxed in 1931 with the 1st XV of that year recording 9 wins and 2 draws out of 14 matches to show that Muir College rugby had finally arrived.

=== Traditional rivals ===
Muir College counts Grey High School, Graeme College, St Andrew's College, Union High and Gill College as their oldest traditional opponents.

=== Famous Muirites ===
Muir College has produced two rugby Springboks, namely Fred Smollan in 1933 and Garth Wright in 1986, while well-known writer on rugby Mel Channer was selected for Scotland shortly after the Second World War. Shane Gates, Michael Killian, Darron Nell, Marzuq Maarman and Robert Blignaut are other notable Muir rugby players.

Other famous Muirites include the Afrikaans poet A.D. Keet who passed his Intermediate exams at Muir where he also won the Nederlands school prize. He subsequently moved on to South African College School in Cape Town where he matriculated in 1905.

Sam Hobson was a classmate of A.D. Keet. He studied at Rhodes University in Grahamstown and he became a school inspector in 1908. Between 1934 and 1944 he served Rhodes as a member of Senate. In 1942 he became Chief Inspector of Native Education and in 1946 Secretary of Education. After retiring he served the United Party in the Cape Province as Caucus leader. Between 1949 and 1963 he served as Chairman of the Senate at Rhodes University. Hobson House at Rhodes is named after him.
