= Graeme College =

High school in Makhanda, Eastern Cape, South Africa

Coordinates: 33.29541°S 26.52055°E

- Graeme College school crest

Location
- Templeton Drive; Makhanda, Eastern Cape; South Africa

Information
- Type: Public high school
- Motto: Virtute et Opera (Courage and toil)
- Established: 1873; 153 years ago
- Sister school: Victoria Girls' High School
- School number: +27 (046) 622 7227
- Headmaster: Kevin Watson
- Staff: 33 teachers 13 support staff
- Grades: 00–12
- Gender: Male
- Age: 6 to 18
- Enrollment: 600 boys
- Language: English
- Schedule: 07:30 - 13:30
- Campus: Urban Campus
- Campus type: Suburban
- Houses: Hutton; Nielson; Vernal; Wiles
- Colours: Gold; Navy; White
- Nickname: Graemians
- Rival: Muir College; St. Andrew's College, Grahamstown; Selborne College; Grey High School; Dale College; Queen's College
- School fees: Contact the school for current fees
- Alumni: Old Graemians
- Website: www.graemecollege.co.za

Graeme College is a public English medium high school for boys located in Makhanda (Grahamstown) in the Eastern Cape province of South Africa. It caters for boys from Grade 00 to Grade 12 and offers both boarding and day options to its pupils. It was founded in April 1873.

== History ==
Over the years the name of the school has undergone several changes. During the period in which it offered matriculation classes to young ladies, it was known as Victoria High School, and finally in 1938 it adopted the name "Graeme College".

== Notable alumni ==
- Professor Colin Bundy, historian.
- William Philip Schreiner (1857-1919). 8th Prime Minister of the Cape Colony.
- Squadron Leader Marmaduke Pattle, DFC and Bar.
- Major-General Robert John (Bobby) Palmer CVO DSO.
- Hennie le Roux, former South African (Springbok) centre (1993-1996).
- William Philip Schreiner (1857-1919). 8th Prime Minister of the Cape Colony.
- Daniel Cheeky Watson. Former Eastern Province and Junior Springbok rugby union player who, with his brother Valance, was one of the first white South African rugby union players to participate in a mixed race rugby game, during the period when mixed-race activities were forbidden by apartheid legislation.
- The Very Rev. Harold Claude Noel Williams (1914-1990), Principal of St Matthew’s College
