= Cecil Moss =

South African rugby union player

- Born: 12 February 1925 Riversdale, Western Cape
- Died: 27 October 2017 (aged 92)
- School: South African College High School
- University: University of Cape Town

Rugby union career
- Position: Wing
International career
Years	Team	Apps	(Points)
1949	South Africa	4	(0)
Coaching career
- Years: Team
- 1982–1989: South Africa

Cecil Moss (12 February 1925 – 27 October 2017) was a South African rugby union player, coach and a professional physician. He was also a qualified medical doctor (anaesthetist) and was part of the medical team who removed the heart from the first heart transplant donor, Denise Darvall. Moss was Jewish and had two children.

He had 4 caps for South Africa in 1949. Educated at the South African College Schools, he developed close involvement with the University of Cape Town. Moss was vice-captain of the Springboks in 1949, when they beat New Zealand 4–0, and played four winning tests for South Africa, debuting on 16 July 1949.

He was head coach of South Africa from 1982 to 1989 and achieved 10 wins and only 2 losses during his time in office. He missed the 1987 Rugby World Cup due to the international sports boycott against his country's apartheid policies.

== Honours ==
In 2024, at the South African Jewish Board of Deputies' 120th anniversary gala dinner, he was honoured among 100 remarkable Jewish South Africans who have contributed to South Africa. The ceremony included speeches from Chief Rabbi Ephraim Mirvis, and Smollan was honoured among other rugby union players such as Joel Stransky, Fred Smollan and Alan Menter.

== See also ==
- List of select Jewish rugby union players

Sporting positions
Preceded by (South Africa) Nelie Smith	South Africa National Rugby Union Coach; 1982–89	Succeeded by (South Africa) John Williams
