= Bamuza Sono =

South African soccer player

Personal information
- Full name: Eric Scara Bamuza Sono
- Date of birth: 21 March 1980 (age 46)
- Place of birth: Johannesburg, South Africa
- Height: 1.76 m (5 ft 9 in)
- Position: Midfielder

Senior career*
Years	Team	Apps	(Gls)
1999–2016	Jomo Cosmos	309	(6)
Total		309	(6)

International career
2007	South Africa	4	(0)
- * Club domestic league appearances and goals

Eric Scara Bamuza Sono (born 21 March 1980) is a South African former professional footballer who played as a midfielder.

== Career ==
Born in Johannesburg, Sono spent his entire professional career with Jomo Cosmos. He also earned 4 international caps for the South Africa national team in 2007.

== Personal life ==
His grandfather Eric Bhamuza Sono and father Jomo Sono were also footballers. In March 2019 it was reported that his house was at risk of repossession due to non-payment of mortgage payments, and in February 2021 it was reported that he was in arrears to the City of Johannesburg Council. In May 2020 he was accused by Sherwyn Naicker of "ruining his reputation" whilst Naicker played at Jomo Cosmos.
