= Jacob Tshisevhe =

South African soccer player

Personal information
- Full name: Jacob Tshisevhe
- Date of birth: 4 April 1969 (age 57)
- Place of birth: Rustenburg, South Africa
- Position: Defender

Youth career
- Madibana Ramblers
- Sandfontein Hurricanes
- Itsoseng Sundowns
- Tlhabane Swallows
- 1989–1992: Danville Celtic
- 1993: Mmabatho Kicks

Senior career*
Years	Team	Apps	(Gls)
1993–2000	Kaizer Chiefs	216	(15)
2001–2002	Black Leopards	6	(0)
2002	Mamelodi Sundowns	2	(0)
2002–2003	Pietersburg Pillars		
Total		224	(15)

International career^{‡}
1996–1997	South Africa	4	(0)
- * Club domestic league appearances and goals as of 13 November 2012 ‡ National team caps and goals as of 13 November 2012

Jacob Tshisevhe (born 4 April 1969 at Rustenburg sandfontein village, North West Province, South Africa), is a South African former football (soccer) defender who played for Kaizer Chiefs, Mamelodi Sundowns, Black Leopards and Pietersburg Pillars

== Club career ==
He joined Chiefs in 1993 after attending trials at Naturena. He joined from a team in the Bophutatswana Premier Soccer League. He made his debut on 23 February 1994 against D'Alberton Callies but he was sent off. He was signed by Mamelodi Sundowns as a free agent after winning a court case when Chiefs refused to release him when his contract expired. A week before their CAF Champions League semi final clash with Interclube Luanda, Angelo Tsichlas, a relative of Anastasia Tsichlas said: "The tall, gangly defender would add depth and experience to their squad." He only played two league matches.

== International career ==
Tshisevhe made his international debut on 14 September 1996 against Kenya and his last match was on 11 February 1997 against Zambia. However his last call-up came in 2002 from Carlos Queiroz.

== Personal life ==
Tshisevhe has a love child, Tsholofelo with Mmapulane Masilo. Tshisevhe was born in Bungeni, Limpopo in the Njhakanjhaka village.

=== Controversies ===
Around June 2002, Tshisevhe's life was full of controversy. A Louis Trichardt man claimed that he caught his pregnant wife entertaining Tshisevhe at his house and suspected that they are in a relationship. The man found a Mamelodi Sundowns and a Black Leopards kit in their spare bedroom. The woman claimed that Tshisevhe would build her a house if she got divorce. Tshisevhe was also caught in child maintenance row where a 12-year-old Tsholofelo Masilo appealed to the Citypress newspaper that she was looking for her father who went by the name of "Jacob Tshisevhe" whom she last saw for the first and last time on 28 September 1994. Tshisevhe was previously ordered by the Lichtenburg maintenance court to pay R800 monthly.

== After retirement ==
Tshisevhe owned a taxi business and a restaurant in Northam. He was a ball boy crew coach during the 2010 FIFA World Cup at Royal Bafokeng Stadium. He currently resides in Moruleng.
