= Rodney Bush =

South African soccer player

Personal information
- Full name: Rodney Bush
- Date of birth: 16 April 1955 (age 71)
- Place of birth: East London, Eastern Cape, South Africa
- Position: Winger

Senior career*
Years	Team	Apps	(Gls)
1971–1973	East London United		
1973–1974	Dundee United	1	(0)
1974–1975	Cape Town City		
1976–1979	Wits University		
1979	→ Arcadia Shepherds (loan)		
1980	San Diego Sockers	31	(3)
1982–1985	Wits University		
1986–1988	Moroka Swallows		
1989–1990	Rangers Johannesburg		

International career
1977	South Africa	1	(0)

Managerial career
- 1986–: Moroka Swallows
- * Club domestic league appearances and goals

Rodney Bush is a South African former international footballer who played as a defender.

== Player ==
=== Professional ===
Bush played mostly in his native country for East London Celtic (he was born and bred in East London) and later Moroka Swallows but also had spells with Scottish side Dundee United and the San Diego Sockers of the North American Soccer League. In his hey-day he was one of the best headers of the ball in South Africa.

=== International ===
Bush represented South Africa in 1977 versus Rhodesia.

== Manager ==
In 1986, Bush became the player manager of the Moroka Swallows.

== Honours ==
=== Moroka Swallows ===
- John Player Special Knockout Cup (Runner-up): 1

1986
