= Jonathan Armogam =

South African footballer

Personal information
- Full name: Jonathan David Armogam
- Date of birth: 9 January 1981 (age 45)
- Place of birth: Cape Town, South Africa
- Height: 1.79 m (5 ft 10 in)
- Positions: Midfielder; striker

Youth career
- Stephanians
- Pelican Colts

Senior career*
Years	Team	Apps	(Gls)
2002–2004	Avendale Athletico		
2004–2006	Bush Bucks		
2006–2008	Engen Santos		
2008–2011	Vasco da Gama		
2011–2013	Engen Santos	22	(2)
2014–2016?	Vasco da Gama	50	(4)
- * Club domestic league appearances and goals

Jonathan David Armogam (born 9 January 1981) is a South African former soccer player who played for Vasco da Gama and Engen Santos in the Premier Soccer League. He can play as a midfielder and a striker.
