= Wayne Matle =

South African soccer player

Personal information
- Full name: Wayne Edward Matle
- Date of birth: 21 January 1988 (age 38)
- Place of birth: Daveyton, South Africa
- Position: Right-back

Youth career
- Kaizer Chiefs

Senior career*
Years	Team	Apps	(Gls)
2008–2011	Kaizer Chiefs	1?	(0)
2011–2013	Maritzburg United	23	(1)
- * Club domestic league appearances and goals as of 10 November 2022

Wayne Matle (born 21 January 1988) is a South African soccer player who plays as a defender. He last played for the Premier Soccer League club Maritzburg United.
