= Israel Hlengani =

South African cricketer

Israel Christopher Hlengani (born 28 July 1988 in Johannesburg, Transvaal) is a South African cricketer who plays for Easterns. He is a left-hand batsman and slow left-arm spinner.

Hlengani, who was educated at Johan Jurgens High School, made his first-class debut for Easterns in October 2005 against Northerns scoring 11 and taking 1/43. Directly after this match came a one-day match between Easterns and Northerns in which Hlengani made his List A debut, he took 3/25 off his full allocation of 9 overs.

In January 2006 Hlengani took figures of 7/107 against Griqualand West these are the best figures of his career.

Hlengani finished his debut season with 19 wickets at 31.26 in nine matches. The following season he was used less often playing just four first-class matches and taking four wickets, he was given the chance to bat at the top order in both formats of game despite having averaged less than 7 with the bat in his first season. During the 2007/08 season Hlengani took 17 wickets at 28.70 in the three-day competition.
