= Itumeleng Sekwale =

South African footballer

Itumeleng Sekwale (born 5 January 1983) is a South African soccer player.

He has played for Supersport United, Moroka Swallows, Jomo Cosmos and Thanda Royal Zulu as a midfielder. He has one cap for the South Africa Under-23s side.

== Playing career ==
- (South Africa) Supersport United
- (South Africa) Moroka Swallows
- (South Africa) Jomo Cosmos (2004–present)
