= Marawaan Bantam =

South African soccer player

Personal information
- Full name: Marawaan Bantam
- Date of birth: 24 November 1977 (age 48)
- Place of birth: Cape Town, South Africa
- Height: 1.70 m (5 ft 7 in)
- Position: Attacking midfielder

Youth career
- Saxon Rovers
- Avendale Athletico

Senior career*
Years	Team	Apps	(Gls)
2002–2007	Engen Santos		
2007–2010	Bidvest Wits	62	(10)
2010–2012	Mpumalanga Black Aces	11	(1)
2012–2015	Cape Town All Stars		
2015–2016	Steenberg United		
- * Club domestic league appearances and goals

Marawaan Bantam (born 24 November 1977) is a South African former soccer player who played as a midfielder.

He hails from Bonteheuwel on the Cape Flats.

He won the Nedbank Cup with Bidvest Wits on 2010. He signed for Mpumalanga Black Aces in summer 2010, He suffered a serious ankle injury whilst at the club, and moved to Cape Town All Stars in 2012. He later signed for Steenberg United. He retired from playing in 2016. After retiring from football, he worked for KC Home Improvers in Cape Town.
