= Ditheko Mototo =

South African soccer player and coach (born 1980)

Personal information
- Full name: Ditheko David Mototo
- Date of birth: 27 December 1980 (age 45)
- Place of birth: Port Elizabeth, South Africa
- Position: Left back

Youth career
- –2005: Bloemfontein Young Tigers

Senior career*
| Years | Team | Apps | (Gls) |
| 2005–2008 | Kaizer Chiefs | 33 | (2) |
| 2008–2011 | Bloemfontein Celtic | 35 | (0) |
| 2010–2011 | Vasco da Gama (loan) | 8 | (0) |
- * Club domestic league appearances and goals

Ditheko Absalom Mototo (born 27 December 1980) is a South African former soccer player who played as a left-back. He last played for Vasco da Gama in the Premier Soccer League, joined Swallows FC as the assistant coach. He joined Vasco in 2010. His previous clubs were: Bloemfontein Celtic, Kaizer Chiefs, Bloemfontein Young Tigers.

== Club career ==
=== Kaizer Chiefs ===
Mototo made his debut on 27 November 2005 in a 1–1 draw against Supersport United. He scored his first goal on 3 December 2005 in a 2–2 draw against Ajax Cape Town. He assisted David Obua's goal on his Soweto derby debut on 11 December 2005.
