= Thandokuhle Mkhonza =

South African soccer player

Personal information
- Full name: Thandokuhle Theophilus Mkhonza
- Date of birth: 1 June 1980 (age 46)
- Place of birth: Piet Retief, South Africa
- Height: 1.80 m (5 ft 11 in)
- Position: Goalkeeper

Team information
- Current team: FC AK

Youth career
- Sprinter Lovers
- 2000–2001: Dobsonville All Nations
- 2001–2002: Spartak

Senior career*
Years	Team	Apps	(Gls)
2002–2012	Jomo Cosmos		
2012–	FC AK	2	(0)
- * Club domestic league appearances and goals as of 09:45, 8 December 2012 (UTC)

Thandokuhle Theophilus Mkhonza (born 1 June 1980) is a South African professional soccer player who plays for FC AK, as a goalkeeper.

== Playing career ==
Born in Piet Retief, Mpumalanga, Mkhonza began his career playing with local sides Sprinter Lovers, Dobsonville All Nations and Spartak. He signed with Premier Soccer League side Jomo Cosmos in August 2002, and made his professional debut for the club in March 2003. He moved to FC AK for the 2012–13 season.
