= Clint Sipho Sephadi =

South African soccer player

Personal information
- Full name: Clint Sipho Sephadi
- Date of birth: 22 May 1973 (age 53)
- Place of birth: Soweto, South Africa
- Height: 1.80 m (5 ft 11 in)
- Position: Midfielder

Senior career*
Years	Team	Apps	(Gls)
1994–1996	Wits University	?	(?)
1996–2008	Jomo Cosmos	?	(?)
2008–2009	Winners Park	?	(?)

International career^{‡}
–	South Africa U23	7	(0)
- * Club domestic league appearances and goals as of 20:07, 8 December 2009 (UTC) ‡ National team caps and goals as of 20:07, 8 December 2009 (UTC)

Clint Sipho Sephadi (born 22 May 1973) is a South African retired professional footballer who last played as a midfielder for Winners Park. He formerly played for Wits University and Jomo Cosmos and has 7 caps for the South African Under-23s team.
