= Tebogo Monyai =

South African soccer player

Personal information
- Full name: Tebogo Reuben Monyai
- Date of birth: 22 September 1979 (age 47)
- Place of birth: Tzaneen, South Africa
- Height: 1.76 m (5 ft 9 in)
- Position: Defender

Youth career
- 1998–2000: Winners Park

Senior career*
Years	Team	Apps	(Gls)
2001–2005	Pretoria University	84	(13)
2006–2008	Moroka Swallows	54	(7)
2009–2010	Black Aces		
2010–2016	University of Pretoria		

International career
2010	South Africa	1	(0)
- * Club domestic league appearances and goals

Tebogo Monyai (born 22 September 1979 in Tzaneen) is a former South African association football defender.

== International career ==
On 11 March 2010 Monyai was first called up for the Bafa Bafana for the Africa Cup of Nations 2012 qualification match against Botswana national football team on 13 March 2010.
