= Masonwabe Maseti =

South African soccer player

Shoez Maseti
Personal information
- Full name: Masonwabe Maseti
- Date of birth: 8 June 1987 (age 39)
- Place of birth: Cape Town, South Africa
- Height: 1.70 m (5 ft 7 in)
- Position: Midfielder

Team information
- Current team: FC Cape Town
- Number: 17

Youth career
- 2001–2004: Hellenic Football Academy
- 2004: Ajax CT

Senior career*
Years	Team	Apps	(Gls)
2005–2006	Free State Stars		
2007–2009	Ikapa Sporting		
2009	Hamitköy		
2010	Chippa United		
2010–?	FC Cape Town		

International career^{‡}
	South Africa U-14	2	(0)
	South Africa U-17	15	(0)
	South Africa U-20	12	(0)
	South Africa U-23	4	(0)
- * Club domestic league appearances and goals as of 16 July 2011 ‡ National team caps and goals as of 10 July 2011

Masonwabe Maseti (born 8 June 1987 in Cape Town, Republic of South Africa) is a football player. He played for the South African team FC Cape Town prior to its dissolution in 2017.

== Career ==
Maseti began his career with Hellenic Football Academy. He signed for Ajax CT in 2004, having come through their youth academy, and made his first team debut in the same year. He later played for Free State Stars and Ikapa Sporting, before in summer 2009 signed for Northern Cypriot top club Hamitköy S.K. After his return of Cyprus, signed for Chippa United.
