= Collen Makgopela =

South African football player (born 1985)

Personal information
- Date of birth: 26 October 1985 (age 41)
- Place of birth: Brits, South Africa
- Height: 1.80 m (5 ft 11 in)
- Position: Forward

Team information
- Current team: Platinum Stars
- Number: 26

Senior career*
Years	Team	Apps	(Gls)
2006–2007	Platinum Stars	0	(0)
- * Club domestic league appearances and goals as of 13 February 2007

Collen Makgopela (born 26 October 1985 in Brits) is a South African football midfielder for Premier Soccer League club Platinum Stars and his previous club was Arcadia Shepherds.
