= Louis Babrow =

South African rugby union player

- Born: 24 April 1915 Smithfield, Free State
- Died: 26 January 2006 (aged 90) Rondebosch, Cape Town
- Height: 1.77 m (5 ft 10 in)
- Weight: 74.84 kg (165.0 lb)
- School: Grey College, Bloemfontein
- University: Cape Town University; Guy's Hospital
- Occupation: Medical doctor

Rugby union career
Provincial / State sides
Years	Team	Apps	(Points)
1935–1936	Western Province		
International career
Years	Team	Apps	(Points)
1937	South Africa	5	(9)

Louis Babrow (24 April 1915 – 26 January 2004) was a South African rugby union player and medical doctor.

== Personal life ==
Babrow was Jewish. His great-granddaughter is Sarah Levy, a South-African born American Olympic bronze medalist, rugby union and rugby sevens player.

== Playing career ==
Babrow attended, and played for, Grey College, Bloemfontein and the University of Cape Town in South Africa, as well as Guy's Hospital in England, where he finished his medical training. He later played for Western Province and South Africa.

In 1937, Babrow faced the dilemma of whether or not to play a game against New Zealand on Yom Kippur, a Jewish holy day. In the end, Babrow played, with the rationale that he was playing in New Zealand, not his homeland:

"I'm a South African Jew, not a New Zealand Jew and New Zealand is eight hours before South Africa in time. When we are playing our holy day will not yet have dawned in South Africa".

At 22, Babrow was the youngest member of the touring party. One of Babrow's cross-kicks set up a try for Ferdie Bergh to score. He recalled that some members of the Springbok party were Greyshirt sympathisers, but that he never experienced anti-semitism on the tour.

=== Test history ===
No.	Opponents	Results (SA 1st)	Position	Tries	Dates	Venue
1.	Australia	9–5	Centre		26 Jun 1937	Sydney Cricket Ground, Sydney
2.	Australia	26–17	Centre	1	17 Jul 1937	Sydney Cricket Ground, Sydney
3.	New Zealand	7–13	Centre		14 Aug 1937	Athletic Park, Wellington
4.	New Zealand	13–6	Centre		4 Sep 1937	Lancaster Park, Christchurch
5.	New Zealand	17–6	Centre	2	25 Sep 1937	Eden Park, Auckland

== Personal life and opinions ==
Babrow was the cousin of Morris Zimerman, the first Jewish Springbok.

Babrow was a lifelong opponent of apartheid, campaigning for the release of Bram Fischer, the radical lawyer, and against the whitewashing of the Steve Biko affair.

In 2004 he said:

"Rugby in South Africa has always had its prejudices and it could take another 20 years until those issues are sorted out in the game. But if you look at the game in the country now, for the first time ever there is not one Jewish player in the Currie Cup [in 2004].

"It used to be a good luck superstition for the Boks to have at least one Jewish player and a policeman in the side. Now there are neither."

In 2004, Babrow voiced concern that rugby was becoming mainly an Afrikaner sport in South Africa.

== Professional career ==
Babrow was an elected member of the Medical and Dental Council for 21 years, and was on the University of Cape Town council for 25 years.

== See also ==
- List of select Jewish rugby union players
- List of South Africa national rugby union players – Springbok no. 246

== Bibliography ==
- Godwin, Terry The Complete Who's Who of International Rugby (Blandford Press, England, 1987, ISBN 0-7137-1838-2)
- Richards, Huw (2007). A Game for Hooligans: The History of Rugby Union. Edinburgh: Mainstream Publishing. ISBN 978-1-84596-255-5.
