= Gordon Gilbert =

Scottish-South African football player

Personal information
- Full name: Gordon MacKenzie Gilbert
- Date of birth: 10 December 1982 (age 43)
- Place of birth: Witbank, South Africa
- Height: 1.85 m (6 ft 1 in)
- Position: Central defender

Youth career
- St Johnstone

Senior career*
Years	Team	Apps	(Gls)
2002–2003	St. Johnstone	0	(0)
2003–2005	East Fife	51	(11)
2005–2006	Tuks	19	(4)
2007–2008	Mpumalanga Black Aces	22	(3)
2008–2010	Kaizer Chiefs	7	(0)
2009–2010	→ Moroka Swallows (loan)	7	(0)
2011–2012	Mpumalanga Black Aces	5	(1)
2013	Thanda Royal Zulu	1	(0)
- * Club domestic league appearances and goals

Gordon MacKenzie Gilbert (born 10 December 1982) is a Scottish-South African football player who played as a left back/central defender in the South African Premier Soccer League.

Gilbert began his career with St. Johnstone in the Scottish Premier League in 2002 however he soon accepted an offer and left for East Fife in the Scottish Football League. At East Fife, he was a first-team regular and helped East Fife earn promotion to the Second Division in the 2002/03 season. Gilbert's performances at East Fife caught the eye of Tuks FC in the country of his birth, where he moved in 2005. Gilbert spent three years playing in the South African First Division with Tuks FC and Mpumalanga Black Aces. During this time, Gilbert was a part of the Black Aces starting team which reached the Nedbank Cup Final in 2008. Leading up to the Nebank Cup final, Gilbert was awarded Man of the Match for his impressive performance in the quarter-finals round. Gilbert's consistent performances earned him a call up to the South African National Development Team (South African B squad) in April, 2008. He made his debut for the Development Team which played against the National Team of Botswana on 24 April 2008.

Following a strong season with Mpumalanga Black Aces, he signed for Kaizer Chiefs of the Premier Soccer League in 2008. At Kaizer Chiefs, Gilbert played in the squad which won both the Mpumalanga International Cup and the MTN Supa 8 competitions. He was also awarded Kaizer Chief's Man of the Match on his Premier Soccer League debut. In 2009 after spending a full season with a competitive Kaizer Chief's squad, it was announced that Gilbert would go on a season-long loan to Moroka Swallows of the Premier Soccer League.

In April 2013, Gilbert signed with promotion-chasing Thanda Royal Zulu FC.
