= Jorry Merahe =

South African soccer player

Kgomotso Jorry Merahe (born 22 June 1980 in Wesselsbron, Free State) is a South African former soccer player who played as a midfielder. He played in the Premier Soccer League for Bloemfontein Celtic and Orlando Pirates. He played for African Warriors in the National First Division in the 2008–09 season.
