= Bevan Fransch =

South African football player

Personal information
- Full name: Bevan Wesley Fransch
- Date of birth: 16 May 1986 (age 40)
- Place of birth: Cape Town, South Africa
- Height: 1.81 m (5 ft 11 1/2 in)
- Positions: Left-back; central defender

Team information
- Current team: Vasco da Gama
- Number: 5

Youth career
- Rygersdal
- Pretoria University
- Ajax Cape Town
- Rygersdal

Senior career*
Years	Team	Apps	(Gls)
2007–2010	Engen Santos	38	(1)
2010–2011	Maritzburg United	12	(0)
2011–2012	Bloemfontein Celtic	3	(0)
2012–	Vasco da Gama	0	(0)
- * Club domestic league appearances and goals as of 17 May 2012 ‡ National team caps and goals as of 17 May 2012

Bevan Fransch (born 16 May 1986 in Cape Town, Western Cape) is a South African football (soccer) player who plays as a defender for Vasco da Gama in the National First Division.

He hails from Bonteheuwel on the Cape Flats.
