= Bonginkosi Macala =

South African footballer

Personal information
- Full name: Bonginkosi St. Ives Macala
- Date of birth: 5 October 1985 (age 41)
- Place of birth: Kroonstad, South Africa
- Height: 1.82 m (6 ft 0 in)
- Positions: Wingback; winger

Youth career
- Moroka Swallows
- Pretoria University
- 2004: University of Connecticut

Senior career*
Years	Team	Apps	(Gls)
2005–2006	Pretoria University		
2006–2008	Jomo Cosmos	26	(2)
2008–2012	Engen Santos	76	(4)
2013–2015	AmaZulu	20	(1)
- * Club domestic league appearances and goals

Bonginkosi Macala (born 5 October 1985 in Kroonstad) is a South African football (soccer) player who last played as a defender and midfielder for AmaZulu in the Premier Soccer League.

He spent time in the United States playing for the University of Connecticut.
