= Eric Sono =

South African soccer player

Eric Bhamuza "Scara" Sono (born 1937 – died 1964) was a South African soccer player who captained the Orlando Pirates and was the father of Jomo Sono and Julius Sono. He died in a car crash at age 27, when Jomo was age 8.. Sono is rememberd for ignoring the apartheid laws prohibiting people of different races from competing with one another.
