= Jomo Sono =

South African football legend (born 1955)

Personal information
- Full name: Ephraim Matsilele Sono
- Date of birth: 17 July 1955 (age 71)
- Place of birth: Soweto, South Africa
- Positions: Midfielder; forward

Team information
- Current team: Jomo Cosmos (owner and manager)

Senior career*
Years	Team	Apps	(Gls)
1973	Orlando Pirates	26	(3)
1977	New York Cosmos	12	(1)
1978	Colorado Caribous	30	(21)
1979	Atlanta Chiefs	29	(6)
1980	Orlando Pirates	55	(30)
1985–1992	Toronto Blizzard	57	(5)

Managerial career
- 1994–: Jomo Cosmos
- 1998: South Africa (Caretaker)
- 2002: South Africa
- 2003: South Africa (Caretaker)
Medal record
Men's football
Representing South Africa (as manager)
Africa Cup of Nations
Runner-up	1998
- * Club domestic league appearances and goals

Ephraim Matsilele Sono OIS (born Madoda Walletjies Mkulwana, 17 July 1955), better known as Jomo Sono, is a South African football club owner, coach and former professional footballer. He has been variously nicknamed the "Black Prince of South African Soccer", "Bra J" and "Mjomana". He is the owner and manager of Jomo Cosmos.

== Early life and football career ==
Sono was born in Soweto, South Africa. When he was eight years old, his father Eric Bhamuza Sono, who was a midfielder for the Orlando Pirates football team in the early 1960s, died as a result of a car crash. Soon after, his mother abandoned him. Consequently, Sono was left in the care of his ailing grandparents; as they were very poor, he had to resort to selling apples and peanuts at football games and train stations to clothe himself, buy food for his grandparents and pay school fees. Both his grandparents were born in the then Northern Transvaal at Valdezia village outside Makhado in Limpopo Province.

Sono's football career had an unusual beginning; during a match that he attended one of the Orlando Pirates' regular players was absent and Sono was requested to stand in for him. He soon gained fame for his all-round ability, dribbling and accurate passing skills. It was during this time that he was given the nickname of Jomo (which means "burning spear") by an Orlando Pirates fan, who saw in him the same leadership qualities as those of Jomo Kenyatta, the then president of Kenya.

In 1979, Sono left his wedding in a hurry to join a game where the Pirates were trailing by two goals. He managed to create three goals and score one for himself, turning the game into a 4-3 victory for the Pirates, and then headed back to his wedding reception.

After he had accomplished everything that he set out to do at Orlando Pirates, Sono went to the United States of America, where, in 1977, he played for the New York Cosmos, where one of his team-mates was the legendary player Pelé. In 1978, he moved to the Colorado Caribous. At the end of the season, the Caribous moved to become the Atlanta Chiefs where Sono played with a fellow South African footballer, Patrick "Ace" Ntsoelengoe. Sono completed his stint in North America playing for the Toronto Blizzard, playing three summers, 1980 through 1982.

Sono also taught and gave demonstrations at Clemson University Soccer Camp for youths.

Sono spent time with Portuguese club Sporting CP and Italian club Juventus, but was unable to obtain work permits for permanent contracts.

== Club owner and coach ==
After his football career in the USA ended, Sono returned to South Africa, where he purchased the Highlands Park club in Johannesburg in 1982, renaming it Jomo Cosmos in honour of his old team.

Under his ownership, the club went on to achieve several successes: it won the National Soccer League in 1987, the Bobsave Super Bowl in 1990, the Cola Cola Cup in 2002 and the Super Eight in 2003.

Sono has also taken a leading role in discovering and developing new football talent, especially from rural areas. Some of the players whom Sono recruited and then went on to play for the South African national team and European clubs include Philemon Masinga, Helman Mkhalele, Sizwe Motaung and Mark Fish. Indeed, his recruits formed the core of the South African squad that won the 1996 African Nations Cup; Sono was also a technical advisor to the team's head coach Clive Barker during the tournament.

In 1998, Sono was appointed as caretaker coach of the Bafana Bafana just before the African Nations Cup tournament in Burkina Faso in the place of Clive Barker, who had been sacked just before the event. Under Sono, the team reached the final of the tournament, where they lost to Egypt. Taking the short time that he had to prepare with the team into account, it was considered a remarkable feat.

After a disappointing performance by the South African national squad during the 2002 African Nations Cup in Mali, Sono was again appointed a technical director to the team. However, the head coach of the team at that time, Carlos Queiróz, felt that his position was being undermined by this appointment and resigned. Sono was again appointed as caretaker coach, this time for the 2002 FIFA World Cup in South Korea and Japan.

During the World Cup, the South Africa squad achieved a 2–2 draw to Paraguay, a 1–0 win over Slovenia and a 3–2 loss to Spain. Despite being eliminated in the group stage, the South African captain, Lucas Radebe, credited Sono with much of the team's performance, saying that he had instilled a good spirit within the team and that he had ensured a very positive atmosphere among the squad.

Sono is the longest-serving coach in the South African Premier League and also sits on the board of the Premier Soccer League. He has also built up a reputation as a successful businessman; in addition to making a substantial profit by developing players and selling them to European teams, he also owns a number of businesses and is a chairman of numerous companies. On 22 October 2009 it was announced that he had returned to the South African Football Association, and one day later on 23 October 2009 he took the job as Technical Director.

== Honours ==
Sono was voted 49th in the Top 100 Great South Africans in 2004.

In December 2016, Sono received two doctorates from the University of London and the University of Dubai for his contribution to football and business. Upon receiving the two doctorates he said: "To me this is the greatest achievement. People say it’s from outside [the doctorates], I don’t think it’s from outside. I think it’s from the world because the University of London is one of the biggest and the commonwealth university is one of the biggest."

== Personal life ==
He is married and has four children, including the South Africa national football team member Bamuza Sono, and his second son Matsilela Junior played for Jomo Cosmos.

== See also ==
- List of African association football families
