= John Bheki Nkambule =

South African soccer player

Personal information
- Full name: John Bheki Nkambule
- Date of birth: 4 January 1981 (age 45)
- Place of birth: Soweto, South Africa
- Height: 1.81 m (5 ft 11 1/2 in)
- Position: Midfielder

Senior career*
Years	Team	Apps	(Gls)
2000–2003	Supersport United	?	(?)
2003	Pirin Blagoevgrad	?	(?)
2004	Supersport United	?	(?)
2004–2008	Jomo Cosmos	?	(?)
- * Club domestic league appearances and goals

John Bheki Nkambule (born 4 January 1981) is a South African former professional soccer player who played as a midfielder.

Nkambule has played in the Premier Soccer League for Supersport United and Jomo Cosmos, and for PFC Pirin Blagoevgrad in the Bulgarian B PFG.
