= Ryan Hodgskin =

South African soccer player

Personal information
- Date of birth: 30 March 1977 (age 49)
- Place of birth: Johannesburg, South Africa
- Height: 1.78 m (5 ft 10 in)
- Position: Right back

Senior career*
Years	Team	Apps	(Gls)
1997–2004	Wits University		
2004–2007	Jomo Cosmos		
- * Club domestic league appearances and goals

Ryan Hodgskin (born 30 March 1977) is a South African former professional soccer player who played as a right back.

== Career ==
Born in Johannesburg, Hodgskin played in the Premier Soccer League for Wits University and Jomo Cosmos.
