= Morris Zimerman =

South African rugby union player

- Born: 8 June 1911 Jansenville, South Africa
- Died: 10 January 1992 (aged 80) Johannesburg, South Africa
- Height: 1.79 m (5 ft 10 in)
- Weight: 82 kg (181 lb)
- School: Jansenville High School
- University: University of Cape Town
- Notable relative: Louis Babrow (cousin)

Rugby union career
- Position: Wing
Amateur team(s)
Years	Team	Apps	(Points)
- Ikeys
Provincial / State sides
Years	Team	Apps	(Points)
1929–1932	Western Province		
- Transvaal
International career
Years	Team	Apps	(Points)
1931–1932	South Africa	4	(3)

Morris Zimerman (8 June 1911 – 10 January 1992) was a South African rugby union player.

== Biography ==
Zimerman grew up in Jansenville and studied law at the University of Cape Town after school. During his student years he played provincial rugby for Western Province and after completing his studies he moved to Johannesburg, where he played for Transvaal.

Zimerman was the first Jew to represent South Africa in rugby union, when he debuted on 5 December 1931. He played in three further tests for South Africa and also in fourteen tour matches, in which he scored thirteen tries.

After his playing days he became involved in rugby administration and became the convenor of the SA Selection Committee. He was the cousin of Louis Babrow, another Jewish Springbok.

=== Test history ===
No.	Opponents	Results (SA 1st)	Position	Tries	Dates	Venue
1.	Wales	8–3	Wing		5 Dec 1931	St. Helen's, Swansea
2.	Ireland	8–3	Wing	1	19 Dec 1931	Lansdowne Road, Dublin
3.	England	7–0	Wing		2 Jan 1932	Twickenham, London
4.	Scotland	6–3	Wing		16 Jan 1932	Murrayfield, Edinburgh

== See also ==
- List of South Africa national rugby union players – Springbok no. 212
