= Alan Menter =

South Africa international rugby union player

Alan Menter (born 30 October 1941, in Doncaster) is an English-born dermatologist, and former flyhalf rugby union player for the Springboks.

== Rugby union ==
Menter played his first international game on the South African tour of France in 1968. The Springboks won both games. He captained both the Universities of Witwatersrand and Pretoria in South Africa through his University career (1961–70) as well as playing for Guys' Hospital Rugby team and the Harlequins during his Fellowship years in London from 1971 to 1973. He also represented the South African Universities Cricket team against New Zealand in 1961.

== Personal life ==
Menter attended Parktown Boys' High School, followed by medical school at the University of Witwatersrand, South Africa in 1968. He completed his dermatology residency at Pretoria General Hospital at the University of Pretoria. Menter is Jewish. He has resided in Dallas, USA since 1975

== Professional life ==
Menter is a dermatologist, Chairman of the Division of Dermatology and Director of the Dermatology Residency program for Baylor University Medical Center, Clinical Professor of Dermatology at the University of Texas Southwestern Medical School, and Principal Faculty at Texas A&M College of Medicine, all in Dallas.

After obtaining his medical degree from the University of Witwatersrand in Johannesburg, South Africa, Menter completed his residency in dermatology at the University of Pretoria in South Africa and fellowships at Guy's Hospital in London and St. John's Hospital for Diseases of the Skin in London, as well as the University of Texas Southwestern Medical School. Menter is board-certified in dermatology. In August 2004, he founded the International Psoriasis Council, an international organization dedicated to raising international consciousness and understanding of psoriasis as a serious immune-mediated disease. He served as its initial President until December 2010

He is also a member of the American Academy of Dermatology, American Dermatological Association, American Society for Laser Medicine and Surgery, American Society of Dermatologic Surgery, British Association of Dermatologists, and The Society for Investigative Dermatology. He is past President of the Texas Dermatology Society (1995–96) and has been an honorary member of Solapso (Latin America Society for Psoriasis) since 2009. He has authored or co-authored more than 255 scientific journal articles, four books and multiple book chapters. Professor Menter was honored at the 2015 American Academy of Dermatology meeting by the Dermatology Foundation with the Clark W. Finnerud Award, intended to honor a dermatologist whose contributions as a clinical educator are exemplary.

== See also ==
- List of select Jewish rugby union players
