= 2020–21 Nedbank Cup =

ke yona (the one)

Tournament details
- Country: South Africa
- Teams: 32

Final positions
- Champions: Tshakhuma Tsha Madzivhandila F.C.

The 2020–21 Nedbank Cup is the 2020–21 edition of South Africa's premier knockout club football (soccer) competition, the Nedbank Cup.

As a result of the suspension of amateur football due to the COVID-19 pandemic, unlike in previous years, no amateur teams took part. Instead, all 16 Premier Soccer League (PSL) clubs and all 16 National First Division (NFD) teams entered the main draw of 32 teams, in spite of eight NFD teams losing their earlier first round matches.

Teams are not seeded, and the first sides drawn receive home-ground advantage. There are no replays in the tournament, and any games which end in a draw after 90 minutes are subject to 30 minutes extra time followed by penalties if necessary.

== First round ==
As the amateur teams which normally enter in the Second Round were unable to take part due to the COVID-19 pandemic, the Premier Soccer League decided in January 2021 to restore the eight losing teams from the First Round and include them in the draw for the Second Round. Hence no teams were eliminated in this round and all progressed.

| 11 December 2020 | Cape Town All Stars | 0–1 | Royal AM | Cape Town |
| 14:00 | | | Mahlasela 31' | Stadium: Parow Park |

| 11 December 2020 | Richards Bay | 1–0 | University of Pretoria | Richards Bay |
| 14:00 | Vilane 75' | | | Stadium: Richards Bay Stadium |

| 12 December 2020 | Pretoria Callies | 2–2 (a.e.t.) (1–3 p) | Steenberg United | Atteridgeville, Pretoria |
| 14:00 | Mahlangu 11', 40' | | Jappie 17'; Stoffels 28' (pen.) | Stadium: Lucas Masterpieces Moripe Stadium |

| 12 December 2020 | Sekhukhune United | 2–1 (a.e.t.) | Jomo Cosmos | Thembisa, Johannesburg |
| 14:00 | Malekana 55'; Nxumalo 104' | | Mohlalefi Rapatsinyana 17' | Stadium: Makhulong Stadium |

| 12 December 2020 | Polokwane City | 1–2 | TS Sporting | Polokwane |
| 14:00 | Mashumba 25' | | Chico 50'; Sithole 89' (pen.) | Stadium: Peter Mokaba Stadium |

| 12 December 2020 | Bizana Pondo | 1–1 (a.e.t.) (1–3 p) | Cape Town Spurs | KwaMashu, Durban |
| 14:00 | Nguse 62' | | Madikane 36' (pen.) | Stadium: Princess Magogo Stadium |
| | Penalties |
| | | | Manzini (penalty scored); Sibande (penalty missed); Mukumela (penalty missed); Madikane (penalty scored); Koopstadt (penalty scored) |

| 13 December 2020 | JDR Stars | 3–2 | Cape Umoya United | Soshanguve, Pretoria |
| 14:00 | Mokhabi 18'; Chiwunga 66' (pen.); Mncube 90+2' | | September 64'; Khanyi 90+5' | Stadium: Giant Stadium |

| 23 December 2020 | Free State Stars | 2–0 | Uthongathi | Bethlehem |
| 11:00 | Suanon 33'; Masehe 79' | | | Stadium: Goble Park |

== Second round ==
| 3 February 2021 | Polokwane City | 2–0 | Steenberg United | Polokwane |
| 14:00 | Chauke 80'; Tlolane 90' | | | Stadium: Peter Mokaba Stadium |

| 3 February 2021 | Mamelodi Sundowns | 3–2 (a.e.t.) | Stellenbosch | Arcadia, Pretoria |
| 14:00 | Shalulile 16', 117'; Sirino 90+1' | | Du Preez 12'; Nange 90+3' | Stadium: Loftus Versfeld Stadium |

| 4 February 2021 | Bizana Pondo | 1–3 | Cape Town All Stars | Umlazi, Durban |
| 14:00 | Mvambi 44' (pen.) | | Isaacs 21'; Mdabuka 64'; Clifford 89' | Stadium: King Zwelithini Stadium |

| 4 February 2021 | Tshakhuma | 1–0 | SuperSport United | Thohoyandou |
| 14:00 | Mnyamane 61' | | | Stadium: Thohoyandou Stadium |

| 4 February 2021 | Pretoria Callies | 1–0 | Royal AM | Atteridgeville, Pretoria |
| 14:00 | Mahlangu 53' | | | Stadium: Lucas Masterpieces Moripe Stadium |

| 4 February 2021 | Maritzburg United | 2–1 | Sekhukhune United | Pietermaritzburg |
| 14:00 | Tlolane 46'; Hlubi 70' | | Mbonani 90+1' | Stadium: Harry Gwala Stadium |

| 6 February 2021 | TS Galaxy | 0–0 (a.e.t.) (4–5 p) | TS Sporting | Johannesburg |
| 14:00 | | | | Stadium: Ellis Park Stadium |
| | Penalties |
| | (penalty missed) Mbunjana; (penalty scored) Lekay; (penalty scored) Fransman; (penalty scored) Msimango; (penalty scored) Aubaas | | Nkabinde (penalty scored); Mokate (penalty scored); Sithole (penalty scored); Chauke (penalty scored); Mojela (penalty scored) |

| 6 February 2021 | JDR Stars | 2–1 (a.e.t.) | University of Pretoria | Soshanguve, Pretoria |
| 14:00 | Mokhabi 59'; Nemukondeni 110' | | Mohlamonyane 90+2' | Stadium: Giant Stadium |

| 6 February 2021 | Orlando Pirates | 1–0 | Uthongathi | Soweto, Johannesburg |
| 14:00 | Mhango 63' | | | Stadium: Orlando Stadium |

| 6 February 2021 | Golden Arrows | 1–1 (a.e.t.) (4–5 p) | AmaZulu | Clermont, Durban |
| 14:00 | Gumede 14' | | Majoro 90+2' | Stadium: Sugar Ray Xulu Stadium |
| | Penalties |
| | (penalty scored) Sibisi; (penalty scored) Sabelo; (penalty scored) Lunga; (penalty missed) Phiri; (penalty scored) Sibiya | | Mzava (penalty scored); Majoro (penalty scored); Xoki (penalty scored); Mthembu (penalty scored); Memela (penalty scored) |

| 6 February 2021 | Cape Town City | 4–0 | Bloemfontein Celtic | Cape Town |
| 14:00 | Morris 59', 68', 90+3'; Nodada 74' | | | Stadium: Cape Town Stadium |

| 7 February 2021 | Swallows | 1–0 | Cape Umoya United | Soweto, Johannesburg |
| 14:00 | Mahlatsi 56' | | | Stadium: Dobsonville Stadium |

| 7 February 2021 | Chippa United | 2–2 (a.e.t.) (4–3 p) | Free State Stars | Port Elizabeth |
| 14:00 | Hanamub 86'; Mbenyane 116' | | Suanon 88'; Tau 105' | Stadium: Nelson Mandela Bay Stadium |

| 7 February 2021 | Jomo Cosmos | 1–2 | Black Leopards | Potchefstroom |
| 14:00 | Zwane 83' | | Karuru 82', 88' | Stadium: Olën Park |

| 7 February 2021 | Kaizer Chiefs | 1–2 | Richards Bay | Nasrec, Johannesburg |
| 14:00 | Castro 76' | | Dube 29'; Vilane 90+1' | Stadium: FNB Stadium |

| 8 February 2021 | Baroka | 1–1 (a.e.t.) (4–5 p) | Cape Town Spurs | Polokwane |
| 16:00 | Mbulu 45+1' | | Cupido 57' | Stadium: Peter Mokaba Stadium |

== Third round ==
| 26 February 2021 | Cape Town All Stars | 3–3 (a.e.t.) (5–3 p) | Cape Town Spurs | Cape Town |
| 15:00 | Isaacs 17'; Witbooi 111'; Maarman 119' | | Makhele 62' (pen.); Batista 98'; Balotelli 112' | Stadium: Parow Park |
| | Penalties |
| | (penalty scored) Mdabuka; (penalty scored) Maarman; (penalty scored) Clifford; (penalty scored) Nabo; (penalty scored) Moloisane | | Norodien (penalty scored); Stander (penalty scored); Jairo (penalty scored); Cupido (penalty missed) |

| 26 February 2021 | Tshakhuma | 2–2 (a.e.t.) (4–3 p) | Swallows | Thohoyandou |
| 18:00 | Mnyamane 18'; Manzini 52' | | Sibiya 44'; Mere 76' | Stadium: Thohoyandou Stadium |
| | Penalties |
| | (penalty scored) Ndengane; (penalty scored) Molangoane; (penalty missed) Ravhuhali; (penalty scored) Theron; (penalty scored) Maphangule | | Gamildien (penalty scored); Mokoena (penalty scored); Gozar (penalty scored); Mere (penalty missed); Nyatama (penalty missed) |

| 27 February 2021 | Black Leopards | 1–0 | AmaZulu | Thohoyandou |
| 15:00 | Anas 52' | | | Stadium: Thohoyandou Stadium |

| 27 February 2021 | Maritzburg United | 1–3 | Orlando Pirates | Pietermaritzburg |
| 18:00 | Kutumela 9' | | Dlamini 56'; Hotto 57'; Pule 78' | Stadium: Harry Gwala Stadium |

| 28 February 2021 | Pretoria Callies | 0–0 (a.e.t.) (5–4 p) | JDR Stars | Atteridgeville, Pretoria |
| 15:00 | | | | Stadium: Lucas Masterpieces Moripe Stadium |

| 28 February 2021 | TS Sporting | 1–2 | Richards Bay | Kabokweni |
| 15:00 | Chauke 72' | | Mayo 77' (pen.), 86' | Stadium: Kabokweni Stadium |

| 28 February 2021 | Chippa United | 2–1 (a.e.t.) | Cape Town City | Port Elizabeth |
| 18:00 | Chidi Kwem 27'; Eva Nga 116' | | Ajagun 66' | Stadium: Nelson Mandela Bay Stadium |

| 10 March 2021 | Mamelodi Sundowns | 4–0 | Polokwane City | Arcadia, Pretoria |
| 14:00 | Shalulile 10'; Maboe 14'; Kapinga 15'; Jali 28' (pen.) | | | Stadium: Loftus Versfeld Stadium |

== Quarter-finals ==
| 13 March 2021 | Chippa United | 2–1 | Richards Bay | Port Elizabeth |
| 15:25 | Laffor 5'; Maloisane 58' | | Vilane 90' | Stadium: Nelson Mandela Bay Stadium |

| 14 March 2021 | Cape Town All Stars | 2–2 (a.e.t.) (4–5 p) | Pretoria Callies | Cape Town |
| 14:30 | Isaacs 33'; Maraisane 71' | | Mahlangu 69'; Sitayitayi 89' | Stadium: Parow Park |
| | Penalties |
| | (penalty scored) Solomons; (penalty scored) Mdabuka; (penalty missed) Seketso; (penalty scored) Nyembe; (penalty missed) Moloisane; (penalty scored) Ndlovu; (penalty missed) Setelele | | Sitayitayi (penalty scored); Moloi (penalty scored); Rorwana (penalty scored); Mahlangu (penalty missed); Ngwenya (penalty missed); Buthelezi (penalty scored); Sebone (penalty scored) |

| 14 March 2021 | Black Leopards | 0–2 | Tshakhuma | Thohoyandou |
| 17:30 | | | Ndlondlo 38'; Ndengane 83' (pen.) | Stadium: Thohoyandou Stadium |

| 15 April 2021 | Mamelodi Sundowns | 4–1 | Orlando Pirates | Arcadia, Pretoria |
| 17:30 | Shalulile 12'; Zwane 49'; Kapinga 78'; Kekana 86' | | Mabaso 33' | Stadium: Loftus Versfeld Stadium |

== Semi-finals ==
| 17 April 2021 | Pretoria Callies | 0–1 | Chippa United | Atteridgeville, Pretoria |
| 15:00 | | | Mtethwa 63' | Stadium: Lucas Masterpieces Moripe Stadium |

| 18 April 2021 | Mamelodi Sundowns | 0–0 (a.e.t.) (5–6 p) | Tshakhuma | Arcadia, Pretoria |
| 15:00 | | | | Stadium: Loftus Versfeld Stadium |
| | Penalties |
| | (penalty scored) Lakay; (penalty scored) Vilakazi; (penalty scored) Nascimento; (penalty scored) Morena; (penalty scored) Zwane; (penalty missed) Kekana | | Nonyane (penalty scored); Ndengane (penalty scored); Malongoane (penalty scored); Madhanaga (penalty scored); Ngele (penalty scored); Nevhulamba (penalty scored) |

== Final ==
8 May 2021
18:00 SAST

| Tshakhuma | 1–0 | Chippa United |
|---|---|---|
| Ndlondlo 27' |

Free State Stadium
Referee: Eugene Mdluli

Lineups:

Tshakhuma:
GK | (Zimbabwe) Washington Arubi
(South Africa) Diamond Thopola | (substituted off) 84'
(South Africa) Alfred Ndengane
(South Africa) Lehlohonolo Nonyane
(South Africa) Ndivhuwo Ravhuhali
(South Africa) Ndabayithethwa Ndlondlo | (yellow card) 90+2'
(South Africa) Miguel Timm
(South Africa) Thabo Rakhale | (substituted off) 81'
(South Africa) Celimpilo Ngema | (substituted off) 81'
(South Africa) Thabo Mnyamane | (yellow card) 90+4'
(South Africa) Lerato Lamola | (substituted off) 63'
Substitutions:
(South Africa) Nicholus Lukhubeni | (substituted on) 84'
(South Africa) Brandon Theron | (substituted on) 81'
(South Africa) Edgar Manaka | (substituted on) 81'
(South Africa) Tokelo Rantie | (substituted on) 63'

Chippa United:
GK | (Uganda) Ismail Watenga
(South Africa) Nyiko Mobbie
(Burundi) Frederic Nsabiyumva
(South Africa) Sandile Mthethwa
(Namibia) Riaan Hanamub
(South Africa) Thabiso Lebitso | (substituted off) 67'
(South Africa) Thamsanqa Sangweni | (substituted off) 72'
(South Africa) Maloisane Mokhele | (substituted off) 67'
(South Africa) Kurt Lentjies | (substituted off) 72'
(South Africa) Sizwe Mdlinzo
(Nigeria) Augustine Chidi Kwem | (substituted off) 77'
Substitutions:
(South Africa) Gregory Damons | (substituted on) 67'
(South Africa) Ayabulela Konqobe | (substituted on) 72'
(Cameroon) Bienvenu Eva Nga | (substituted on) 67' | (yellow card) 71'
(South Africa) Mduduzi Sibeko | (substituted on) 72'
(Liberia) Anthony Laffor | (substituted on) 72'
