= Ndabayithethwa Ndlondlo =

South African soccer player

Personal information
- Full name: Ndabayithethwa Phillip Ndlondlo
- Date of birth: 28 May 1995 (age 31)
- Position: Midfielder

Team information
- Current team: Marumo Gallants
- Number: 15

Senior career*
Years	Team	Apps	(Gls)
2018–2022	TTM/Marumo Gallants	104	(15)
2022–2025	Orlando Pirates	41	(2)
2025–	Marumo Gallants	11	(0)

International career
2025–	South Africa A		
- * Club domestic league appearances and goals as of 4 January 2026

Ndabayithethwa Ndlondlo (born 28 May 1995) is a South African soccer player who plays as a midfielder for Marumo Gallants in the Premier Soccer League.

Ndlondlo played for Tshakhuma Tsha Madzivhandila and then for Marumo Gallants, the team which bought TTM's license. He made his first-tier debut in the 2020-21 South African Premier Division.

Ndlondlo was on the winning team in the 2020-21 (where he scored the winning goal) and 2022-23 Nedbank Cup, and was on the losing team in the 2021-22 Nedbank Cup final. He did so alongside teammate Miguel Timm, with the duo first playing for TTM, then for Marumo Gallants and the third time for Orlando Pirates. With three consecutive cup finals for three different clubs, Ndlondo and Timm equalled a record held by Kermit Erasmus, who achieved the same feat in 2012, 2013 and 2014.

After the 2021-22 season concluded, there were several rumours about a transfer for Ndlondlo to one of South Africa's biggest clubs or to AmaZulu. While Ndlondo started the 2022-23 season at Marumo Gallants as well, he was bought by Orlando Pirates on the last day of the transfer window. He scored his first goal for Orlando Pirates in January 2023. In his first season with the Bucs, the team won the cup and finished second in the league.

During the 2023-24 season, Ndlondlo was suspended after receiving four yellow cards, which resulted in his absence in a match against Mamelodi Sundowns.
