= 2021–22 South African Premiership =

Premiership
- Season: 2021–22
- Dates: 20 August 2021 – 30 May 2022
- Country: (South Africa) (16 teams)
- Champions: Mamelodi Sundowns (12th title)
- Relegated: Baroka F.C.
- Matches: 240
- Goals: 480 (2 per match)
- Top goalscorer: Peter Shalulile (23 goals)
- Biggest home win: Mamelodi Sundowns 6–0 Golden Arrows (12 April 2022)
- Biggest away win: Marumo Gallants 0–4 Mamelodi Sundowns (7 November 2021)
- Highest scoring: Cape Town City 4-3 Golden Arrows (23 October 2021)
- Longest winning run: (14 games); Mamelodi Sundowns
- Longest unbeaten run: (17 games); Mamelodi Sundowns
- Longest winless run: (9 games); Marumo Gallants
- Longest losing run: (6 games); TS Galaxy

The 2021–22 South African Premiership (known as the DSTV Premiership for sponsorship reasons) was the 26th season of the Premier Soccer League since its establishment in 1996. It was played from 20 August 2021 to 30 May 2022. Mamelodi Sundowns won the title for the fifth consecutive year, qualifying for the 2022–23 CAF Champions League along with Cape Town City. Royal AM and Nedbank Cup runners-up Marumo Gallants qualified for the 2022–23 CAF Confederation Cup.

== Team changes ==
The following teams changed division since the 2020–21 season.

=== To National First Division ===
Relegated from 2020–21 South African Premier Division

- Black Leopards

=== From National First Division ===
Promoted to 2021–22 South African Premiership

- Sekhukhune United (promoted as champions)

=== Purchased statuses ===
- Marumo Gallants purchased their status from Tshakhuma Tsha Madzivhandila
- Royal AM purchased their Premiership status from Bloemfontein Celtic

== Teams ==
=== Stadiums and locations ===
Location of teams in the 2021–22 PSL.

Team	Location	Stadium	Capacity
AmaZulu	Durban	Moses Mabhida Stadium	55,500
Baroka	Polokwane	Peter Mokaba Stadium	45,500
Cape Town City	Cape Town	Cape Town Stadium	55,000
Chippa United	Port Elizabeth	Nelson Mandela Bay Stadium	48,459
Golden Arrows	Durban (Clermont)	Sugar Ray Xulu Stadium	12,000
Kaizer Chiefs	Johannesburg (Soweto)	FNB Stadium	94,736
Mamelodi Sundowns	Pretoria (Marabastad)	Loftus Versfeld Stadium	51,762
Maritzburg United	Pietermaritzburg	Harry Gwala Stadium	12,000
Marumo Gallants	Polokwane	Peter Mokaba Stadium	45,500
Swallows	Johannesburg (Soweto)	Dobsonville Stadium	24,000
Orlando Pirates	Johannesburg (Soweto)	Orlando Stadium	37,139
Royal AM	Durban	Chatsworth Stadium	6,500
Sekhukhune United	Johannesburg (Tembisa)	Makhulong Stadium	10,500
Stellenbosch	Stellenbosch	Danie Craven Stadium	8,000
SuperSport United	Pretoria (Atteridgeville)	Lucas Masterpieces Moripe Stadium	28,900
TS Galaxy	Mbombela	Mbombela Stadium	40,929

=== Number of teams by province ===
Position	Province	Number	Teams
1	Gauteng	6	Kaizer Chiefs, Mamelodi Sundowns, Swallows, Orlando Pirates, Sekhukhune United, SuperSport United
2	KwaZulu-Natal	4	AmaZulu, Golden Arrows, Maritzburg United and Royal AM
3	Limpopo	2	Baroka and Marumo Gallants
3	Western Cape	2	Cape Town City and Stellenbosch
5	Eastern Cape	1	Chippa United
5	Mpumalanga	1	TS Galaxy

== League table ==
Pos	Team	Pld	W	D	L	GF	GA	GD	Pts	Qualification or relegation
1	Mamelodi Sundowns (C)	30	19	8	3	56	20	+36	65	Qualification for Champions League
2	Cape Town City	30	12	13	5	32	24	+8	49	Qualification for Champions League
3	Royal AM	30	12	11	7	43	31	+12	47	Qualification for Confederation Cup
4	Stellenbosch	30	11	14	5	32	23	+9	47	Qualification for Confederation Cup
5	Kaizer Chiefs	30	13	8	9	34	26	+8	47	
6	Orlando Pirates	30	10	14	6	34	28	+6	44	
7	AmaZulu	30	8	17	5	24	22	+2	41	
8	SuperSport United	30	10	10	10	36	32	+4	40	
9	Lamontville Golden Arrows	30	9	13	8	35	40	−5	40	
10	Marumo Gallants	30	7	13	10	22	28	−6	34	
11	Sekhukhune United	30	8	9	13	21	24	−3	33	
12	Maritzburg United	30	7	10	13	22	33	−11	31	
13	TS Galaxy	30	7	9	14	22	38	−16	30	
14	Chippa United	30	5	14	11	23	33	−10	29	
15	Swallows (O)	30	4	14	12	22	36	−14	26	Qualification for Playoffs
16	Baroka (R)	30	6	7	17	22	40	−18	25	Relegation to the First Division

Source: Premier Soccer League
(C) Champions; (O) Play-off winners; (R) Relegated

== Results ==
Home \ Away	AMA	BAR	CTC	CHI	GDA	TSG	KZC	MAG	MDS	MAR	SWA	ORL	ROY	SEK	STL	SSU
AmaZulu	—	1–0	2–0	2–2	1–2	0–0	1–1	0–0	1–0	1–0	0–0	1–1	0–0	0–0	2–2	0–0
Baroka	0–1	—	0–0	0–1	1–0	1–0	0–1	2–0	0–1	0–1	0–1	0–0	1–0	1–0	1–1	3–1
Cape Town City	0–0	5–1	—	1–0	4–3	2–0	0–0	1–0	0–0	3–2	2–1	1–1	1–1	2–1	0–3	0–0
Chippa United	1–1	2–2	0–0	—	1–2	0–1	1–3	2–3	0–0	0–0	0–0	1–3	2–2	0–0	1–0	0–0
Lamontville Golden Arrows	2–2	3–2	0–1	1–2	—	1–1	2–1	3–1	0–1	2–1	0–0	0–0	2–2	0–0	0–2	3–2
TS Galaxy	0–1	2–1	2–2	3–1	2–2	—	0–0	0–0	0–3	1–1	1–0	1–0	1–4	0–1	0–1	1–1
Kaizer Chiefs	1–1	2–1	1–2	4–0	0–1	0–0	—	1–0	1–1	2–0	2–2	2–1	1–4	2–0	0–1	0–1
Marumo Gallants	0–1	3–0	0–0	0–0	0–0	3–1	0–0	—	0–4	0–0	1–1	0–0	2–2	2–2	1–0	0–0
Mamelodi Sundowns	1–0	2–1	0–0	1–1	6–0	3–0	2–0	1–1	—	1–0	3–0	4–1	3–2	2–0	0–3	2–2
Maritzburg United	1–1	0–1	0–1	0–2	1–2	1–0	0–1	1–0	2–1	—	1–1	0–0	1–0	0–2	0–0	2–1
Swallows	0–1	3–2	0–0	0–0	2–2	0–1	1–3	0–1	2–4	1–1	—	1–1	1–0	0–1	1–1	0–3
Orlando Pirates	2–1	0–0	0–0	0–0	0–0	2–0	1–2	2–1	0–2	4–1	1–0	—	1–1	2–1	2–2	3–2
Royal AM	0–0	1–1	1–2	1–0	0–0	4–2	1–0	2–0	2–3	2–1	1–0	2–2	—	1–0	1–0	2–1
Sekhukhune United	2–0	4–0	1–0	0–1	1–1	0–1	0–1	0–1	0–2	1–1	0–1	0–1	1–0	—	1–1	0–0
Stellenbosch	2–2	1–0	1–0	2–1	0–0	1–0	1–0	1–0	1–1	1–1	1–1	0–3	30 Jan	16 Jan	—	0–1
SuperSport United	2–0	2–0	3–2	1–1	3–1	2–1	1–2	1–2	0–1	2–1	2–2	2–0	0–2	0–1	0–0	—

Updated to match(es) played on 23 May 2022. Source: Flashscore
Legend: Blue = home team win; Yellow = draw; Red = away team win.

== Statistics ==
=== Top goalscorers ===
As of 27 May 2022

Rank	Player	Club	Goals
1	Peter Shalulile	Mamelodi Sundowns	23
2	Victor Letsoalo	Royal AM	15
3	Bienvenu Eva Nga	Chippa United	10
4	Mduduzi Mdantsane	Cape Town City	9
4	Ashley Du Preez	Stellenbosch	9
5	Deon Hotto	Orlando Pirates	8
5	Keagan Dolly	Kaizer Chiefs	8
5	Mxolisi Macuphu	TS Galaxy	8
7	Khama Billiat	Kaizer Chiefs	7
7	Thamsanqa Gabuza	SuperSport United	7
7	Luvuyo Memela	AmaZulu	7
7	Ndabayithethwa Ndlondlo	Marumo Gallants	7
7	Chibuike Ohizu	Sekhukhune United	7
7	Kwame Peprah	Orlando Pirates	7

=== Hat-tricks ===
Player	For	Against	Result	Date
(Namibia) Peter Shalulile	Mamelodi Sundowns	Swallows	4–2 (A)	6 April 2022
(Namibia) Peter Shalulile	Mamelodi Sundowns	Golden Arrows	6–0 (H)	12 April 2022
