= Thato Khiba =

South African soccer player (born 1996)

Personal information
- Date of birth: 5 August 1996 (age 30)
- Position: Midfielder

Team information
- Current team: Stellenbosch
- Number: 12

Senior career*
Years	Team	Apps	(Gls)
2018–2019	Uthongathi	6	(0)
2019–2021	African All Stars		
2021–2023	Marumo Gallants	32	(0)
2023–2025	TS Galaxy	29	(1)
2025–	Stellenbosch	26	(2)
- * Club domestic league appearances and goals as of 4 January 2026

Thato Khiba (born 5 August 1996) is a South African soccer player who plays as a midfielder for Stellenbosch in the South African Premier Division.

In his early career, he played for the reserve team of Kaizer Chiefs. Being released in August 2018, he contested the 2018–19 National First Division with Uthongathi before moving down to the third tier and African All Stars. He eventually earned a transfer to Marumo Gallants. Here, he made his first-tier debut in the 2021-22 South African Premier Division. With the Marumo Gallants, Khiba among others reached the semi-final of the 2022-23 CAF Confederation Cup. When Marumo Gallants were relegated in 2023, Khiba remained in the Premier Division through a transfer to TS Galaxy.

Reports about a transfer to a larger club began to surface in 2024, intensifying in January 2025. The transfer to Stellenbosch was confirmed in January 2025.
