= Sibusiso Hlubi =

South African soccer player

Personal information
- Date of birth: 2 October 1994 (age 32)
- Position: Midfielder

Senior career*
Years	Team	Apps	(Gls)
2016	Mthatha Bucks	13	(0)
2016–2017	Cape Town All Stars	4	(1)
2017	Mthatha Bucks	14	(1)
2017–2019	Free State Stars	26	(4)
2019–2020	Polokwane City	16	(1)
2020–2021	Maritzburg United	16	(0)
2021–2022	Sekhukhune United	2	(0)
- * Club domestic league appearances and goals as of 30 October 2022

Sibusiso Hlubi (born 2 October 1994) is a South African soccer player who last played as a midfielder for South African Premier Division side Sekhukhune United.
