= Lehlohonolo Nonyane =

South African soccer player

Personal information
- Full name: Lehlohonolo Carreca Nonyane
- Date of birth: 7 December 1986 (age 39)
- Place of birth: Botshebong, South Africa
- Height: 1.82 m (6 ft 0 in)
- Position: Left back

Team information
- Current team: Kruger United

Senior career*
Years	Team	Apps	(Gls)
2009–2010	United FC	13	(0)
2010–2014	Jomo Cosmos	57	(9)
2014–2016	Mpumalanga Black Aces	45	(3)
2016	Cape Town City		
2016–2018	Golden Arrows	15	(1)
2018–2020	Bidvest Wits	20	(0)
2020–2021	TTM	18	(0)
2021–2023	Marumo Gallants	34	(1)
2023–2024	Baroka	19	(2)
2024–	Kruger United	7	(0)

International career^{‡}
2013–2015	South Africa	3	(0)
- * Club domestic league appearances and goals as of 14 November 2024 ‡ National team caps and goals as of 1 January 2020

Lehlohonolo Carreca Nonyane (born 7 December 1986) is a South African professional soccer player, who currently plays for National First Division club Kruger United as a defender.

He won the 2020–21 Nedbank Cup with TTM. Staying in the squad after it was bought out by Marumo Gallants, he was the team captain until being released in 2023. After a stint with Baroka in the 2023–24 National First Division, he trained with newly promoted First Division club Kruger United.
