= Diamond Thopola =

South African footballer

Thabane Thopola
Personal information
- Full name: Thabane Diamond Thopola
- Date of birth: 23 March 1990 (age 36)
- Place of birth: Polokwane, South Africa
- Height: 1.78 m (5 ft 10 in)
- Position: Right back

Senior career*
Years	Team	Apps	(Gls)
2012–2015	Thanda Royal Zulu	73	(1)
2015–2017	Chippa United	55	(0)
2018–2019	Orlando Pirates	11	(0)
2019–2020	Chippa United	8	(2)
2020–2022	Tshakhuma Tsha Madzivhandila	27	(0)
2022–2023	All Stars	18	(0)
2023–2024	Magesi	8	(0)

International career^{‡}
2017	South Africa	1	(0)
- * Club domestic league appearances and goals as of 19 August 2024 ‡ National team caps and goals as of 21 March 2021

Thabang Diamond Thopola (born 23 March 1990) is a South African soccer player.

He won the 2020–21 Nedbank Cup with TTM.
