= 2023–24 South African Premiership =

Football league season

Premiership
- Season: 2023–24
- Dates: 4 August 2023 – 25 May 2024
- Champions: Mamelodi Sundowns
- Relegated: Cape Town Spurs
- Champions League: Mamelodi Sundowns; Orlando Pirates
- Confederation Cup: Stellenbosch; Sekhukhune United
- Matches: 240
- Goals: 485 (2.02 per match)
- Top goalscorer: Tshegofatso Mabasa (16 goals)
- Biggest home win: Orlando Pirates 7–1 Golden Arrows (6 April 2024)
- Biggest away win: Royal AM 0–4 Orlando Pirates (28 April 2024); Kaizer Chiefs 1–5 Mamelodi Sundowns (02 May 2024)
- Highest scoring: Orlando Pirates 7–1 Golden Arrows (6 April 2024)
- Longest winning run: 11 matches Mamelodi Sundowns
- Longest unbeaten run: 29 matches Mamelodi Sundowns
- Longest winless run: 11 matches Moroka Swallows
- Longest losing run: 8 matches Cape Town Spurs
- All statistics correct as of 25 May 2024.

The 2023–24 South African Premiership, known as the DSTV Premiership for sponsorship reasons, and also commonly referred to as the PSL after the governing body, was the 28th consecutive season of the South African Premiership. The season ran from 4 August 2023 and concluded on 25 May 2024. Mamelodi Sundowns successfully defended the title with 6 games remaining, winning the title for the seventh consecutive year, starting from the 2017–18 season.

Kaizer Chiefs, who've won the title four times, finished tenth, their lowest ever finish in the PSL era.

== Teams ==
=== Team changes ===
Promoted to 2023–24 South African Premiership

•Polokwane City

•Cape Town Spurs

Relegated to 2023-24 National First Division

•Marumo Gallants

•Maritzburg United

Stadiums

Location of teams in the 2023–24 Premiership.

=== Stadiums and locations ===
Team	Location	Stadium	Capacity
AmaZulu	Durban	Moses Mabhida Stadium	55,500
Cape Town City	Cape Town	Cape Town Stadium	55,000
Cape Town Spurs	Cape Town	Athlone Stadium	34,000
Chippa United	Gqeberha	Nelson Mandela Bay Stadium	48,459
Golden Arrows	Durban (Clermont)	Sugar Ray Xulu Stadium	12,000
Kaizer Chiefs	Johannesburg (Soweto)	FNB Stadium	94,736
Mamelodi Sundowns	Pretoria (Marabastad)	Loftus Versfeld Stadium	51,762
Moroka Swallows	Johannesburg (Soweto)	Dobsonville Stadium	24,000
Orlando Pirates	Johannesburg (Soweto)	Orlando Stadium	37,139
Polokwane City	Polokwane	Pietersburg Stadium	15,000
Richards Bay	Richards Bay	Richards Bay Stadium	8,000
Royal AM	Chatsworth	Chatsworth Stadium	6,500
Sekhukhune United	Polokwane	Peter Mokaba Stadium	45,500
Stellenbosch	Stellenbosch	Danie Craven Stadium	8,000
SuperSport United	Pretoria (Atteridgeville)	Lucas Masterpieces Moripe Stadium	28,900
TS Galaxy	Mbombela	Mbombela Stadium	40,929

==== Club head coaches ====
Club	Coach
AmaZulu	Pablo Franco
Cape Town City	Eric Tinkler
Cape Town Spurs	Ernst Middendorp
Chippa United	Thabo September and Kwanele Kopo
Golden Arrows	Steve Komphela
Kaizer Chiefs	Cavin Johnson
Mamelodi Sundowns	Rhulani Mokwena
Moroka Swallows	Musa Nyatama
Orlando Pirates	José Riveiro
Polokwane City	Phuti Mohafe
Richards Bay	Vusumuzi Vilakazi
Royal AM	John Maduka
Sekhukhune United	Lehlohonolo Seema
Stellenbosch	Steve Barker
SuperSport United	Gavin Hunt
TS Galaxy	Sead Ramović

== League table ==
Pos	Team	Pld	W	D	L	GF	GA	GD	Pts	Qualification or relegation
1	Mamelodi Sundowns (C)	30	22	7	1	51	10	+41	73	Qualification for 2024–25 CAF Champions League
2	Orlando Pirates	30	14	8	8	45	27	+18	50	Qualification for 2024–25 CAF Champions League
3	Stellenbosch	30	14	8	8	39	24	+15	50	Qualification for 2024–25 CAF Confederation Cup
4	Sekhukhune United	30	12	9	9	31	24	+7	45	Qualification for 2024–25 CAF Confederation Cup
5	Cape Town City	30	12	9	9	29	25	+4	45	
6	TS Galaxy	30	12	8	10	30	24	+6	44	
7	SuperSport United	30	11	11	8	35	33	+2	44	
8	Polokwane City	30	9	12	9	21	27	−6	39	
9	Golden Arrows	30	10	8	12	32	43	−11	38	
10	Kaizer Chiefs	30	9	9	12	25	30	−5	36	
11	AmaZulu	30	8	12	10	24	30	−6	36	
12	Chippa United	30	8	10	12	29	30	−1	34	
13	Royal AM	30	9	6	15	24	43	−19	33	
14	Moroka Swallows	30	8	8	14	24	36	−12	32	
15	Richards Bay (O)	30	8	6	16	24	37	−13	30	Qualification for Playoffs
16	Cape Town Spurs (R)	30	6	5	19	23	43	−20	23	Relegation to the National First Division

Source: Premier Soccer League
(C) Champions; (O) Play-off winners; (R) Relegated

== Results ==
Home \ Away	AMA	CTC	CAS	CHI	GDA	KZC	MSD	ORL	PLK	RBU	ROY	SEK	SWA	STL	SSU	TSG
AmaZulu	—	3–2	1–1	2–1	1–3	1–1	0–1	0–0	0–0	0–0	3–0	1–0	1–1	0–1	0–0	1–0
Cape Town City	0–1	—	3–1	2–1	1–1	0–0	0–0	0–2	1–0	3–1	2–0	0–1	2–0	0–1	1–1	1–1
Cape Town Spurs	3–1	0–2	—	0–1	1–2	2–0	0–1	2–1	0–1	1–0	1–2	0–2	0–1	0–3	1–2	2–0
Chippa United	1–1	1–1	2–0	—	2–0	2–0	0–2	1–1	1–2	3–0	2–3	0–1	1–2	0–0	1–0	0–0
Golden Arrows	1–3	0–1	1–1	1–1	—	2–1	0–0	1–2	3–2	2–1	1–1	0–1	1–1	0–0	2–2	0–2
Kaizer Chiefs	3–0	0–1	3–2	0–0	1–0	—	1–5	0–1	0–0	1–0	0–0	2–1	0–0	0–1	2–1	2–2
Mamelodi Sundowns	3–0	0–1	3–0	2–0	4–0	2–1	—	1–1	0–0	1–0	1–0	2–1	3–0	3–1	1–1	3–0
Orlando Pirates	1–0	2–0	1–1	2–0	7–1	3–2	0–1	—	1–1	0–1	4–2	1–0	2–0	2–3	1–1	1–0
Polokwane City	0–0	2–2	3–1	1–0	0–1	0–1	0–2	0–1	—	0–0	1–0	0–0	0–0	1–0	1–1	1–0
Richards Bay	2–1	1–3	1–0	1–2	1–2	1–0	0–1	0–0	0–1	—	1–2	1–1	1–0	2–1	3–1	0–0
Royal AM	0–0	2–0	0–1	0–0	1–0	0–0	0–2	0–4	3–1	3–2	—	0–1	0–0	1–3	0–1	1–0
Sekhukhune United	0–1	2–2	1–0	2–0	0–1	1–1	1–2	2–1	0–0	3–1	1–0	—	1–2	1–1	2–1	0–0
Swallows	2–1	0–1	3–1	0–0	0–3	0–1	2–2	1–1	0–1	0–1	1–2	1–4	—	2–0	1–2	1–0
Stellenbosch	0–0	1–0	1–1	1–1	3–0	0–2	0–1	1–0	5–0	2–1	3–0	0–0	0–2	—	1–2	3–0
SuperSport United	1–1	1–0	0–0	0–2	0–3	1–0	0–2	3–1	1–1	2–0	3–1	1–1	2–0	1–1	—	0–1
TS Galaxy	2–0	0–0	1–0	2–0	3–1	1–0	1–1	1–0	3–0	1–1	3–0	2–0	2–1	1–2	2–3	—

Source: Flashscore
Legend: Blue = home team win; Yellow = draw; Red = away team win.

== Statistics ==
=== Top scorers ===
As of 26 July 2024

Rank	Player	Club	Goals
1	(South Africa) Tshegofatso Mabaso	Orlando Pirates	16
2	(South Africa) Iqraam Rayners	Stellenbosch	15
3	(Brazil) Lucas Ribeiro Costa	Mamelodi Sundowns	12
4	(South Africa) Bradley Grobler	SuperSport United	12
5	(South Africa) Khanyisa Mayo	Cape Town City	10
6	(Namibia) Peter Shalulile	Mamelodi Sundowns	9
7	(Serbia) Samir Nurković	TS Galaxy	8
8	(South Africa) Sphiwe Mahlangu	TS Galaxy	8
9	(Nigeria) Chibuike Ohizu	Sekhukhune United	8
10	(Nigeria) Augustine Kwem	AmaZulu	7
11	(South Africa) Ashley Cupido	Cape Town Spurs	7

== See also ==
- 2023 MTN 8
- 2023–24 National First Division
- 2023–24 Nedbank Cup
