= Marlon Heugh =

South African soccer player

Personal information
- Date of birth: 25 July 1990 (age 36)
- Place of birth: Cape Town, South Africa
- Position: Goalkeeper

Team information
- Current team: Royal AM
- Number: 1

Senior career*
Years	Team	Apps	(Gls)
2014–2020	Highlands Park	62	(0)
2020–2022	TS Galaxy	20	(0)
2022–	Royal AM	1	(0)
2023	→ TTM (loan)	5	(0)
- * Club domestic league appearances and goals as of 9 September 2024

Marlon Heugh (born 25 July 1990) is a South African soccer player who plays as a goalkeeper for Royal AM in the South African Premier Division.

He was born in Cape Town and hails from Kraaifontein. Playing several years for Highlands Park, he was a reserve to several goalkeepers, among others Tapuwa Kapini. In 2019 he alternated with Thela Ngobeni. The team earned promotion from the 2015–16 and then the 2017–18 National First Division. In between, he made his first-tier debut in the 2016–17 South African Premier Division.

Heugh moved on to TS Galaxy in 2020. The 2020–21 season was somewhat successful, with Heugh being given the Player of the Season award in an internal ceremony. After being released by TS Galaxy in 2022 he was acquired by Royal AM in 2022.

He did not become a regular player here either, and was loaned out to Tshakhuma Tsha Madzivhandila in 2023. Royal AM was originally going to release Heugh, but received a transfer ban from FIFA and therefore chose to recall Heugh from loan in September 2023. On a short term, Heugh would take up the competition with Xolani Ngcobo and Mondli Mpoto, neither of whom had impressed, according to iDiski Times.
