= Zaphaniah Mbokoma =

South African soccer player

Personal information
- Date of birth: 14 March 1992 (age 34)
- Place of birth: Cape Town, South Africa
- Position: Midfielder

Senior career*
Years	Team	Apps	(Gls)
2012–2014	Cape Town	36	(1)
2012–2014	Cape Town All Stars	38	(4)
2016–2019	Chippa United	40	(1)
2019	→ Jomo Cosmos (loan)	7	(1)
2019–2020	Richards Bay	5	(1)
2020–2022	Moroka Swallows	39	(3)
2022	Cape Town All Stars	8	(0)
2023–2024	Sekhukhune United	2	(0)
- * Club domestic league appearances and goals as of 13 October 2024

Zaphaniah Mbokoma (born 14 March 1992) is a South African soccer player who played as a midfielder for three clubs in the South African Premier Division.

Born in Cape Town, Mbokoma played in the second tier for F.C. Cape Town and Cape Town All Stars. He moved to Chippa United in the winter of 2016, making his first-tier debut in the 2015-16 South African Premier Division.

Chippa United intended to release Mbokoma in the winter transfer window of 2019, but he managed to secure a six-month loan deal at Jomo Cosmos. In June 2019 he moved on to Richards Bay, but played seldomly. As Richards Bay manager Brandon Truter moved to Moroka Swallows in 2019, Mbokoma was able to join him at that club, securing promotion from the 2019–20 National First Division.

In January 2022, Truter was sacked by Moroka Swallows, who subsequently released Mbokoma, only for him to rejoin Cape Town All Stars. After the All Stars did not beat Moroka Swallows to win promotion in the 2021–22 National First Division play-offs, the club relocated to another city, and Mbokoma did not follow. After going without a club in 2022–23, he was picked up by Sekhukhune United in the summer of 2023. He did not make a dent at Sekhukhune United, and was released in January 2024, with the club vowing to pay him for the duration of his contract.
