= 2020–21 South African Premiership =

Premiership
- Season: 2020–21
- Dates: 24 October 2020 – 5 June 2021
- Country: (South Africa) (16 teams)
- Champions: Mamelodi Sundowns (11th title)
- Relegated: Black Leopards
- Champions League: Mamelodi Sundowns, AmaZulu FC
- Confederation Cup: Orlando Pirates, Tshakhuma Tsha Madzivhandila
- Matches: 240
- Goals: 507 (2.11 per match)
- Top goalscorer: Bradley Grobler (16 goals)
- Biggest home win: Maritzburg United 5–1 Chippa United (3 April 2021)
- Biggest away win: Cape Town City 1–5 AmaZulu FC (28 April 2021)
- Highest scoring: Mamelodi Sundowns 4–3 AmaZulu FC (22 November 2020); AmaZulu FC 4–3 Bloemfontein Celtic (2 February 2021)
- Longest winning run: (6 games); AmaZulu FC
- Longest unbeaten run: (21 games); Mamelodi Sundowns
- Longest winless run: (11 games); Chippa United
- Longest losing run: (5 games); Black Leopards; Maritzburg United; TTM
- All statistics correct as of 5 June 2021.

The 2020–21 South African Premiership season (known as the DSTV Premiership for sponsorship reasons) was the 25th season of the Premiership since its establishment in 1996. Mamelodi Sundowns won the title for the fourth consecutive year, qualifying for the 2021–22 CAF Champions League along with second placed AmaZulu. Third placed Orlando Pirates and Nedbank Cup winners Tshakhuma Tsha Madzivhandila qualified for the 2021–22 CAF Confederation Cup.

== Team changes ==
The following teams have changed division since the 2019–20 season.

=== To National First Division ===
Relegated from 2019–20 South African Premier Division

- Polokwane City

=== From National First Division ===
Promoted to 2020–21 South African Premiership

- Swallows (promoted as champions)

=== Purchased status ===
- Tshakhuma Tsha Madzivhandila (TTM) (purchased the Bidvest Wits status)
- TS Galaxy (purchased the Highlands Park status)

== Teams ==
=== Stadiums and locations ===
Location of teams in the 2020–21 PSL.

Team	Location	Stadium	Capacity
AmaZulu	Durban (Durban North)	King Goodwill Zwelithini Stadium	10,000
Baroka	Polokwane	Peter Mokaba Stadium	45,500
Black Leopards	Thohoyandou	Thohoyandou Stadium	40,000
Bloemfontein Celtic	Bloemfontein	Dr. Petrus Molemela Stadium	22,000
Cape Town City	Cape Town	Cape Town Stadium	55,000
Chippa United	Port Elizabeth	Nelson Mandela Bay Stadium	48,459
Golden Arrows	Durban (Lamontville)	Princess Magogo Stadium	12,000
Kaizer Chiefs	Johannesburg (Soweto)	FNB Stadium	94,736
Mamelodi Sundowns	Pretoria (Marabastad)	Loftus Versfeld Stadium	51,762
Maritzburg United	Pietermaritzburg	Harry Gwala Stadium	12,000
Swallows	Johannesburg (Soweto)	Dobsonville Stadium	24,000
Orlando Pirates	Johannesburg (Soweto)	Orlando Stadium	37,139
Stellenbosch	Stellenbosch	Coetzenburg Stadium	8,000
SuperSport United	Pretoria	Lucas Masterpieces Moripe Stadium	28,900
TS Galaxy	Kameelrivier	Kameelrivier Stadium	4,000
TTM	Thohoyandou	Thohoyandou Stadium	40,000

=== Number of teams by province ===
Position	Province	Number	Teams
1	Gauteng	5	Kaizer Chiefs, Mamelodi Sundowns, Swallows, Orlando Pirates, SuperSport United
2	KwaZulu-Natal	3	Maritzburg United, Golden Arrows and AmaZulu
2	Limpopo	3	Baroka, Black Leopards and TTM
4	Western Cape	2	Cape Town City and Stellenbosch
5	Free State	1	Bloemfontein Celtic
5	Eastern Cape	1	Chippa United
5	Mpumalanga	1	TS Galaxy

== League table ==
Pos	Team	Pld	W	D	L	GF	GA	GD	Pts	Qualification or relegation
1	Mamelodi Sundowns (C)	30	19	10	1	49	14	+35	67	Qualification for Champions League
2	AmaZulu	30	15	9	6	38	23	+15	54	Qualification for Champions League
3	Orlando Pirates	30	13	11	6	33	22	+11	50	Qualification for Confederation Cup
4	Lamontville Golden Arrows	30	11	14	5	40	28	+12	47	
5	SuperSport United	30	11	12	7	37	31	+6	45	
6	Swallows	30	8	20	2	31	23	+8	44	
7	Cape Town City	30	10	11	9	42	40	+2	41	
8	Kaizer Chiefs	30	8	12	10	34	37	−3	36	
9	TS Galaxy	30	9	9	12	26	31	−5	36	
10	Baroka	30	7	13	10	28	36	−8	34	
11	Bloemfontein Celtic	30	6	14	10	30	35	−5	32	
12	Tshakhuma Tsha Madzivhandila	30	7	10	13	19	35	−16	31	Qualification for Confederation Cup (Note: Tshakhuma Tsha Madzivhandila qualified as 2020–21 Nedbank Cup winners.)
13	Maritzburg United	30	7	9	14	27	36	−9	30	
14	Stellenbosch	30	5	14	11	26	32	−6	29	
15	Chippa United (O)	30	5	12	13	24	37	−13	27	Qualification for Playoffs
16	Black Leopards (R)	30	5	8	17	23	47	−24	23	Relegation to the First Division

Updated to match(es) played on 5 June 2021. Source: Premier Soccer League
(C) Champions; (O) Play-off winners; (R) Relegated

== Results ==
Home \ Away	AMA	BAR	BLP	BLC	CTC	CHI	GDA	KZC	MDS	MAR	MOR	ORL	STE	SSU	TSG	TTM
AmaZulu	—	0–1	2–0	4–3	1–1	3–1	0–2	2–1	0–0	0–0	1–0	1–1	2–1	1–0	2–1	2–0
Baroka	0–2	—	2–1	1–1	1–1	2–1	1–1	1–1	0–2	2–1	0–1	1–2	1–3	1–3	0–1	0–0
Black Leopards	0–1	1–3	—	1–1	0–2	0–3	1–3	2–1	1–2	1–0	1–2	2–0	0–0	1–1	0–3	1–1
Bloemfontein Celtic	1–1	2–0	1–0	—	0–0	1–1	1–1	2–2	0–2	1–1	1–1	0–1	1–1	2–1	2–1	1–0
Cape Town City	1–5	0–0	3–1	4–2	—	1–1	4–2	0–2	0–2	0–0	1–1	2–2	1–2	3–0	3–2	3–0
Chippa United	0–1	0–1	0–0	1–2	0–0	—	0–0	0–1	1–2	3–1	2–2	0–3	1–0	1–1	0–1	1–1
Golden Arrows	0–1	0–0	1–2	1–1	1–1	1–0	—	2–2	1–1	2–1	1–1	2–0	0–0	3–1	3–0	1–0
Kaizer Chiefs	1–2	1–1	2–2	1–1	1–2	0–1	3–2	—	0–3	0–2	1–1	1–0	2–2	1–1	0–0	3–0
Mamelodi Sundowns	4–3	2–0	1–1	0–0	3–0	2–0	0–0	1–2	—	2–0	1–1	1–0	3–0	3–1	2–0	0–0
Maritzburg United	0–0	1–1	1–0	2–1	0–1	5–1	3–2	1–1	1–1	—	1–1	0–1	2–2	1–2	0–3	0–1
Moroka Swallows	0–0	1–1	1–0	1–0	3–2	1–1	1–1	1–0	0–0	2–0	—	1–1	0–0	1–1	0–0	1–1
Orlando Pirates	1–0	1–1	3–0	1–0	2–0	1–0	0–0	2–1	0–3	2–0	1–1	—	1–1	2–1	1–1	0–0
Stellenbosch	0–1	2–3	1–1	1–1	1–2	2–0	1–3	0–0	1–2	0–1	1–1	0–0	—	1–1	0–0	2–0
SuperSport United	1–1	1–1	2–0	2–1	2–1	2–2	0–1	2–1	0–0	2–0	1–1	1–1	1–0	—	0–0	1–0
TS Galaxy	1–0	2–2	3–1	1–0	1–0	0–1	1–1	0–1	0–1	0–2	2–1	1–0	0–1	0–3	—	0–2
TTM	1–1	1–0	1–2	1–0	2–2	0–0	1–2	2–1	1–3	1–0	0–2	0–3	1–0	0–2	1–1	—

Source: Flashscore
Legend: Blue = home team win; Yellow = draw; Red = away team win.

== Statistics ==
=== Top scorers ===
Rank	Player	Club	Goals
1	(South Africa) Bradley Grobler	SuperSport United	16
2	(Namibia) Peter Shalulile	Mamelodi Sundowns	15
3	(South Africa) Thabiso Kutumela	Maritzburg United	12
4	(South Africa) Ruzaigh Gamildien	Swallows	11
5	(South Africa) Themba Zwane	Mamelodi Sundowns	10
6	(South Africa) Mduduzi Mdantsane	Cape Town City	9
6	(South Africa) Fagrie Lakay	Cape Town City	9
6	(South Africa) Victor Letsoalo	Bloemfontein Celtic	9
9	(South Africa) Luvuyo Memela	AmaZulu	8
9	(South Africa) Lehlohonolo Majoro	AmaZulu	8
9	(South Africa) Lebogang Manyama	Kaizer Chiefs	8

=== Hat-tricks ===
Player	For	Against	Result	Date
(Cameroon) Bienvenu Evanga	Chippa United	Maritzburg United	3–1 (H)	3 November 2020
(South Africa) Themba Zwane	Mamelodi Sundowns	AmaZulu	4–3 (H)	23 November 2020
(South Africa) Lebogang Manyama	Kaizer Chiefs	Golden Arrows	3–2 (H)	2 June 2021

=== Clean sheets ===
No	Player	Club	Clean sheets
1	(Uganda) Dennis Onyango	Mamelodi Sundowns	15
2	(South Africa) Veli Mothwa	AmaZulu	11
2	(South Africa) Sifiso Mlungwana	Golden Arrows	11
4	(Zimbabwe) Washington Arubi	TTM	10
5	(South Africa) Lee Langeveldt	Stellenbosch	8
5	(South Africa) Ronwen Williams	SuperSport United	8
5	(Netherlands) Peter Leeuwenburgh	Cape Town City	8
8	(Ghana) Richard Ofori	Orlando Pirates	7
8	(South Africa) Marlon Heugh	TS Galaxy	7
10	(Nigeria) Daniel Akpeyi	Kaizer Chiefs	6
10	(Namibia) Virgil Vries	Swallows	6

== See also ==
- 2020 MTN 8
- 2020 Telkom Knockout
- 2020–21 Nedbank Cup
- 2020–21 National First Division
