= Lerato Lamola =

South African soccer player

Personal information
- Full name: Lerato Trevor Lamola
- Date of birth: 17 June 1986 (age 40)
- Place of birth: Limpopo, South Africa
- Height: 1.70 m (5 ft 7 in)
- Position: Forward

Senior career*
Years	Team	Apps	(Gls)
- Tigers
- Vardos
2012–2013	Roses United	23	(8)
2013–2016	Bloemfontein Celtic	79	(19)
2016–2020	Lamontville Golden Arrows	105	(21)
2020–2022	TTM/Marumo Gallants	35	(1)
2022	Platinum City Rovers	3	(0)
2023	Polokwane City	6	(0)

International career^{‡}
2014	South Africa	1	(0)
- * Club domestic league appearances and goals as of 19 August 2024 ‡ National team caps and goals as of 29 July 2020

Lerato Trevor Lamola (born 17 June 1986) is a South African soccer player who played as a forward.

== Early and personal life ==
He was born in Limpopo. He graduated with a degree in Logistics Management from Tshwane University of Technology in 2009.

== Club career ==
After graduating from university, Lamola played for Tigers, Vardos and Roses United before joining Bloemfontein Celtic in June 2013. He signed for Lamontville Golden Arrows in 2016, before being released by the club in 2020. He won the 2020–21 Nedbank Cup with TTM.

== International career ==
He made one appearance for the South Africa national football team in 2014.
