= Sizwe Mdlinzo =

South African soccer player

Personal information
- Full name: Sizwe Eric Mdlinzo
- Date of birth: 11 March 1992 (age 34)
- Place of birth: Chatsworth, South Africa
- Position: Midfielder

Senior career*
| Years | Team | Apps | (Gls) |
| 2014–2016 | Cape Town All Stars | 48 | (3) |
| 2016–2018 | Chippa United | 31 | (0) |
| 2018–2020 | TS Galaxy | 45 | (9) |
| 2020–2022 | Chippa United | 46 | (0) |
| 2022–2023 | Marumo Gallants | 10 | (0) |
- * Club domestic league appearances and goals as of 2 May 2023

Sizwe Eric Mdlinzo (born 11 March 1992) is a South African professional soccer player who last played as a midfielder for South African Premier Division side Marumo Gallants.
