= Ndivhuwo Ravhuhali =

South African soccer player

Personal information
- Full name: Ndivhuwo Phineas Ravhuhali
- Date of birth: 29 August 1992 (age 34)
- Position: Defender

Team information
- Current team: Black Leopards

Senior career*
Years	Team	Apps	(Gls)
- Joe's Express
2015–2017	Baroka	44	(2)
2017–2019	Polokwane City	23	(1)
2019–2020	SuperSport United	0	(0)
2020–2024	TTM/Marumo Gallants	52	(2)
2023	→ Venda (loan)	1	(0)
2024–	Black Leopards	5	(0)
- * Club domestic league appearances and goals as of 19 November 2024

Ndivhuwo Ravhuhali (born 29 August 1992) is a South African soccer player who plays as a defender for Black Leopards in the South African First Division.

He hails from Louis Trichardt in Limpopo Province. He played for Joe's Express in the SAFA Second Division. In 2015 he moved on to Baroka. He helped the team win the 2015–16 National First Division and reached the semi-finals of the 2015–16 Nedbank Cup. He was named the 2015–16 Nedbank Cup Young Player of the Year. He made his first-tier debut in the 2016–17 South African Premier Division before joining Polokwane City in 2017. In October 2017 he scored a long-range free-kick for Polokwane City; scoring was rare for Ravhuhali, and in addition he received the Goal of the Month award.

Ravhuhali left Polokwane City in 2019. He reportedly trained with Highlands Park and was wanted by Black Leopards, but signed for SuperSport United in August on a free transfer. The time at SuperSport United was a failure. Following a five-month injury he could not battle his way into the squad, and did not play a single game. In 2020, Ravhuhali moved on to Tshakhuma Tsha Madzivhandila (TTM) and started getting playing time. The first season proved successful as TTM won the 2020–21 Nedbank Cup, with Ravhuhali starting the cup final. This entailed qualifying for CAF competition, at the same time as the team changed its identity to Marumo Gallants.

In 2024 Ravhuhali moved on to Black Leopards.
