= Pogiso Mahlangu =

South African soccer player

Personal information
- Date of birth: 1 June 1992 (age 34)
- Place of birth: Mamelodi, South Africa
- Position: Midfielder

Team information
- Current team: Sekhukhune United
- Number: 35

Senior career*
Years	Team	Apps	(Gls)
2013	University of Pretoria	1	(0)
2013–2015	Vasco da Gama	29	(0)
2016–2020	University of Pretoria	63	(7)
2020–2021	Pretoria Callies	28	(10)
2021–	Sekhukhune United	49	(2)
- * Club domestic league appearances and goals as of 15 November 2024

Pogiso Mahlangu (born 1 June 1992) is a South African soccer player who plays as a midfielder for Sekhukhune United in the South African Premier Division.

He was born in Mamelodi. He was able to study sports science at the University of Pretoria, and also play for the University of Pretoria F.C. ("Tuks"). He made his first-tier debut in the 2012–13 South African Premier Division, though it was only a minuscule substition. He then spent time with Vasco da Gama on the second tier before returning to the "Tuks". In 2020 he joined Pretoria Callies. With this team, he notably reached the semi-final of the 2020–21 Nedbank Cup.

He was subsequently wanted by bigger clubs and moved up one tier to the South African Premier Division, joining Sekhukhune United. Reportedly, Golden Arrows showed interest too.

With Sekhukhune, he reached the final of the 2022–23 Nedbank Cup, qualifying for the 2023–24 CAF Confederation Cup, and finished fourth in the 2023–24 South African Premier Division, qualifying for the 2024–25 CAF Confederation Cup. Mahlangu would possibly play more as a wing-back from 2024.
