= Edgar Manaka =

South African soccer player

Personal information
- Full name: Edgar Diala Manaka
- Date of birth: 10 May 1989 (age 37)
- Place of birth: Ga-Matlala, South Africa
- Positions: Midfielder; striker

Team information
- Current team: Marumo Gallants
- Number: 5

Youth career
- Tshiamo Sports Academy
- SuperSport United
- Mkhumishe Carnivores
- Phungo All Stars

Senior career*
Years	Team	Apps	(Gls)
2010–2014	Black Leopards	36+	(1+)
2014–2015	Platinum Stars	1	(0)
2015–2016	Golden Arrows	4	(0)
2016–2020	Polokwane City	86	(1)
2020–	TTM/Marumo Gallants	93	(3)
- * Club domestic league appearances and goals as of 4 January 2026

Edgar Diala Manaka (born 29 May 1989) is a South African soccer player who plays as a forward for Marumo Gallants in the South African Premier Division.

== Career ==
He was born on 29 May 1989 in Kgomoschool, Ga-Matlala. In his younger days he spent time with the Tshiamo Sports Academy, SuperSport United's youth section, Mkhumishe Carnivores and Phungo All Stars.

Manaka joined Black Leopards, playing for the team in the 2010–11 National First Division. At the time, Black Leopards' competitor Batau alleged that Manaka was fielded without the proper registration. Nonetheless, Black Leopards made it through the playoffs to the 2011–12 South African Premier Division where Manaka made his first-tier debut.

Before the summer transfer window closed in 2014, Manaka moved on to Platinum Stars. The contract spanned three years. Manaka only played one league game, however, and only four league games at the Golden Arrows whom he joined in 2015. In early 2016 he changed clubs again, this time to Polokwane City.

In 2020, Manaka was announced as one of a dozen new signings by Tshakhuma Tsha Madzivhandila (TTM). The first season proved successful as TTM won the 2020–21 Nedbank Cup, with Manaka appearing as a substitute in the cup final. This entailed qualifying for CAF competition, but the team also changed its identity to Marumo Gallants.

After Marumo Gallants were relegated in 2023, Manaka vowed to stay with the club, describing it as "one family". He was rumoured to move on in the 2024 winter transfer window, but remained. Marumo Gallants failed promotion, but then instead bought a licence to play in the 2024–25 Premier Division.

== Personal life ==
He is nicknamed "Stiga". In 2019 he established the Edgar Manaka Foundation.
