= Joseph Malongoane =

South African footballer

Personal information
- Full name: Joseph Malongoane
- Date of birth: 17 March 1988 (age 38)
- Place of birth: Moletjie, Limpopo, South Africa
- Height: 1.62 m (5 ft 4 in)
- Position: Midfielder

Team information
- Current team: Marumo Gallants
- Number: 21

Senior career*
Years	Team	Apps	(Gls)
2009–2012	Platinum Stars	63	(3)
2012–2013	AmaZulu	11	(1)
2013–2014	Orlando Pirates	6	(0)
2015–2016	Chippa United	27	(4)
2016–2020	Kaizer Chiefs	37	(4)
2020–2021	TTM	16	(1)
2021–	Marumo Gallants	31	(4)
- * Club domestic league appearances and goals as of 2 May 2023

Joseph Malongoane (born 17 March 1988) is a South African footballer who plays for Marumo Gallants. He was born in the village of Moletjie, Limpopo but grew up in Alexandra, Gauteng.

The skilful midfielder started his professional career on the books of Platinum Stars under the guidance of coach Steve Komphela. His career then led him to stints with AmaZulu, Orlando Pirates and Chippa United. At the start of the 2016/17 season, Molangoane re-united with coach Steve again when he committed to Amakhosi for two years.

Tight (as he is known by football fans) suffered a horrific injury when he broke his ankle playing against Free State Stars in August 2018. This saw him being ruled out for the rest of 2018.

In May 2019, Kaizer Chiefs announced that midfielder has extended his stay with the Soweto giants after signing a one-year contract extension with an option to extend.

In July 2020, TTM announced that they have signed Joseph together with Oupa Manyisa on two years contracts. in the Premier Soccer League.

== Honours ==
Orlando Pirates

- Nedbank Cup: 2013-14

TTM

- Nedbank Cup: 2020-21
