= Nicholus Lukhubeni =

South African soccer player

Personal information
- Date of birth: 27 March 1996 (age 30)
- Position: Full-back

Team information
- Current team: Mamelodi Sundowns

Senior career*
Years	Team	Apps	(Gls)
- Highlands Park
–2019	M Tigers		
2019–	Mamelodi Sundowns	5	(1)
2020–2021	→ Tshakhuma Tsha Madzivhandila (loan)	24	(0)
2021	→ Sekhukhune United (loan)	1	(0)
2022	→ Maritzburg United (loan)	12	(0)
2022–2023	→ Moroka Swallows (loan)	25	(0)
2023–2024	→ Cape Town Spurs (loan)	8	(0)
- * Club domestic league appearances and goals as of 1 August 2024

Nicholus Lukhubeni (born 27 March 1996) is a South African soccer player who plays as a defender for Mamelodi Sundowns in the Premier Soccer League.

Lukhubeni hails from Kraaipan, and was the second soccer player from that village to play professionally after Fusi Moalusi. He played for amateur teams such as Old Eds, Balfour Alexandra FC and Godisanang FC before a brief spell at Highlands Park. He then joined M Tigers, a feeder team of the Mamelodi Sundowns, before being promoted to the "Downs" in 2019. He made his "Downs" debut in the same year, proceeding to start his first match, and in his third match he scored his first Premier Division goal.

However, he was not able to secure steady playing time for Mamelodi Sundowns, and was sent out on loans to Tshakhuma Tsha Madzivhandila in 2020–21 (winning the 2020–21 Nedbank Cup), Sekhukhune United and Maritzburg United in 2021–22, Moroka Swallows in 2022–23 and Cape Town Spurs in 2022–24. Mamelodi Sundowns reportedly received some ridicule from fans who was bemused by the high number of loans.
