= Pule Maraisane =

South African soccer player (born 1995)

Personal information
- Full name: Pule Fransis Maraisane
- Date of birth: 3 January 1995 (age 31)
- Place of birth: South Africa
- Positions: Midfielder; winger; forward

Team information
- Current team: Marumo Gallants
- Number: 31

Youth career
- Stars of Africa
- Fluminense Star of Africa

Senior career*
Years	Team	Apps	(Gls)
2014	Tourizense	13	(1)
2015-2016	GAIS	11	(0)
2016	Lefke		
2017	Mthatha Bucks	1	(0)
2018-2019	1911 Çerkezköyspor	19	(2)
2021	Cape Town All Stars	8	(0)
2021–2022	Mamelodi Sundowns	2	(0)
2022–2023	Marumo Gallants	6	(0)
- * Club domestic league appearances and goals

Pule Fransis Maraisane (born 3 January 1995) is a South African professional soccer player who plays as a midfielder, winger, or forward.

== Career ==
As a youth player, Maraisane joined the youth academy of Brazilian side Fluminense.

Before the second half of 2013–14, he signed for Tourizense in the Portuguese third division, where he suffered an injury.

In 2015, he signed for Swedish club GAIS.

In 2016, Maraisane signed for Lefke in Northern Cyprus.

Before the second half of 2016–17, he signed for South African outfit Mthatha Bucks.

In 2018, he signed for 1911 Çerkezköyspor in the Turkish fifth tier.

In 2019, Maraisane almost signed for Orlando Pirates, one of South Africa's most successful teams. In 2021 he signed for Mamelodi Sundowns, but the stay was short-lived.
