= Auguston Leonard =

South African soccer player

Personal information
- Full name: Auguston Marlon Leonard
- Date of birth: 3 March 1991 (age 35)
- Place of birth: Boksburg, South Africa
- Height: 1.77 m (5 ft 10 in)
- Positions: Midfielder; striker

Team information
- Current team: Mthatha Bucks
- Number: 29

Youth career
- Spades United
- Juventus Reiger Park
- Orlando Pirates
- Moroka Swallows

Senior career*
Years	Team	Apps	(Gls)
2009–2012	Moroka Swallows	24	(0)
2012	→ Bloemfontein Celtic (loan)	2	(0)
2012–2014	Bloemfontein Celtic	19	(0)
2014	→ Milano United (loan)	6	(0)
2015–2017	Highlands Park	37	(5)
2017	→ Pretoria (loan)	9	(2)
2017–	Mthatha Bucks	8	(0)
- * Club domestic league appearances and goals as of 15 February 2018

Auguston Leonard (born 3 March 1991) is a South African soccer player who plays as a midfielder and striker for Mthatha Bucks.

Leonard hails from Reiger Park, Boksburg.
