= Brandon Theron =

South African soccer player

Personal information
- Full name: Brandon Junior Theron
- Date of birth: 5 June 1993 (age 33)
- Positions: Midfielder; winger

Team information
- Current team: Golden Arrows
- Number: 42

Youth career
- Stars of Africa Academy

Senior career*
Years	Team	Apps	(Gls)
2012–2016	Milano United	89	(16)
2016–2018	Highlands Park	38	(3)
2018–2020	Cape Umoya United	48	(2)
2020–2021	Tshakhuma Tsha Madzivhandila	17	(1)
2021–2023	Maritzburg United	40	(2)
2023–	Golden Arrows	37	(1)
- * Club domestic league appearances and goals as of 4 January 2026

Brandon Theron (born 5 June 1993) is a South African soccer player who plays as a midfielder and winger for Golden Arrows in the Premier Soccer League.

After graduating from the Stars of Africa Academy, Theron played four seasons for Milano United before being bought by Highlands Park in 2016. The club was newly promoted to the first tier, and Theron made his first-tier debut in the 2016-17 South African Premier Division. Highlands Park were relegated again after one season. After Highlands Park, Theron played for Cape Umoya United.

Theron returned to the top flight with Tshakhuma Tsha Madzivhandila. He won the 2020–21 Nedbank Cup with the team before being signed by Maritzburg United ahead of the 2021–22 season. In 2022, the team found itself at the bottom of the table when the Premier Division took a World Cup break, at which time Theron was injured. After the season ended in relegation, Theron was able to stay in the Premier Division nonetheless, as he was signed by Golden Arrows.
