= Matlou =

Matlou is a South African surname. Notable people with the surname include:

- George Matlou (born 1998), South African soccer player
- Joshua Matlou, South African politician
- Noko Matlou (born 1985), South African professional soccer player
