= Vusimuzi Mncube =

South African soccer player

Personal information
- Full name: Vusimuzi William Mncube
- Date of birth: 6 September 1993 (age 33)
- Position: Midfielder

Team information
- Current team: Sekhukhune United
- Number: 10

Youth career
- Orlando Pirates

Senior career*
Years	Team	Apps	(Gls)
2014–2016	Cape Town All Stars	2	(0)
2016–2018	Chippa United	4	(0)
2018–2019	Jomo Cosmos	21	(2)
2019–2021	JDR Stars	51	(14)
2021–	Sekhukhune United	75	(5)
- * Club domestic league appearances and goals as of 18 October 2024

Vusimuzi Mncube (born 6 September 1993) is a South African soccer player who plays as a midfielder for Sekhukhune United in the South African Premier Division.

He was a youth player at Orlando Pirates. Having short spells in Cape Town All Stars and Chippa United at the start of his senior career, Mncube made his first-tier debut in the 2016–17 South African Premier Division. In 2018, he signed for National First Division side Jomo Cosmos.

From 2019, Mncube played two seasons as a regular in JDR Stars. The team was close to win promotion to the top flight, but ultimately failed. In 2021, Mncube instead returned to the first tier by way of a transfer to Sekhukhune United.

He scored his first Premier Division goal against Baroka in February 2022. Another notable goal came in January 2023, the only goal in a game against Kaizer Chiefs. Mncube was a regular at Sekhukhune United over the next seasons, playing as a substitute in the 2022–23 Nedbank Cup final where Sekhukhune United lost to Orlando Pirates.

He is nicknamed "Skheshe".
