= Sihle =

Sihle is a Nguni given name meaning "beautiful". The name is a shortened form of Siphesihle which means "beautiful gift". Notable people with the name include:

- Sihle Lonzi, South African politician
- Sihle Zikalala (born 1973), South African politician
