= Junior Zindoga =

Zimbabwean footballer (born 1998)

Personal information
- Date of birth: 28 July 1998 (age 28)
- Place of birth: New York ( USA)
- Height: 1.87 m (6 ft 2 in)
- Position: Forward

Senior career*
| Years | Team | Apps | (Gls) |
| –2020 | Maritzburg United | | |
| 2020–2023 | Ngezi Platinum F.C. | | |
| 2023–2024 | Yadah Stars F.C. | | |
| 2024 | Nsingizini Hotspurs F.C. | | |
| 2025 | Marumo Gallants F.C. | 7 | (0) |
| 2025– | TS Galaxy F.C. | 11 | (0) |

International career^{‡}
| 2025– | Zimbabwe | 1 | (0) |
- * Club domestic league appearances and goals ‡ National team caps and goals as of 1 January 2026

Junior Zindoga (born 28 July 1998) is a Zimbabwean footballer who plays as a forward for South African Premiership side TS Galaxy F.C. and the Zimbabwe national team.

== Club career ==
Zindoga has played for South African Premiership side Maritzburg United.

In 2024 he played for Premier League of Eswatini side Nsingizini Hotspurs F.C..

In 2025 he joined Marumo Gallants before leaving for TS Galaxy at the start of the 2025/26 season.

== International career ==
Zindoga was called up for the Zimbabwe national team at the 2025 Africa Cup of Nations. He made his debut in a 3–2 loss against South Africa.
