= Alfred Ndengane =

South African soccer player

Personal information
- Full name: Bulelani Alfred Ndengane
- Date of birth: 19 January 1987 (age 39)
- Place of birth: Cape Town, South Africa
- Position: Defender

Senior career*
| Years | Team | Apps | (Gls) |
- Hanover Park
| 2012–2014 | FC Cape Town | 38 | (2) |
| 2014–2018 | Bloemfontein Celtic | 125 | (5) |
| 2019–2020 | Orlando Pirates | 21 | (1) |
| 2020–2021 | Tshakhuma Tsha Madzivhandila | 23 | (3) |
| 2021–2023 | Maritzburg United | 37 | (4) |
- * Club domestic league appearances and goals as of 11 January 2024

Bulelani Alfred Ndengane (born 19 January 1987) is a South African professional soccer player who last played as a defender for Maritzburg United.

== Early and personal life ==
Ndengane was born in Cape Town.

== Career ==
Ndengane started his career at Hanover Park, and had spells at FC Cape Town and Bloemfontein Celtic, leaving the latter in 2018, before joining Orlando Pirates in January 2019. He was released by Orlando Pirates in October 2020.

== Honours ==
Tshakhuma Tsha Madzivhandila FC

- Nedbank Cup:2020-21
