= TTM F.C. =

TTM F.C. might refer to the following football/soccer clubs:

- Tshakhuma Tsha Madzivhandila F.C., South African club
- TTM Thailand Tobacco Monopoly F.C., Thai club
