= Maloisane Mokhele =

South African soccer player

Personal information
- Full name: Maloisane Patrick Mokhele
- Date of birth: 8 September 1996 (age 30)
- Position: Midfielder

Team information
- Current team: Magesi
- Number: 13

Senior career*
Years	Team	Apps	(Gls)
–2018	Barcelona		
2018–2020	Bloemfontein Celtic Development		
2020–2022	Chippa United	43	(3)
2023–2024	Sekhukhune United	11	(1)
2024–	Magesi	4	(0)
- * Club domestic league appearances and goals as of 28 March 2024

Maloisane Mokhele (born 8 September 1996) is a South African soccer player who plays as a midfielder for Magesi in the South African Premier Division.

He was born in Bothaville and nicknamed "Shoes". After playing eight years for Barcelona and two years for Bloemfontein Celtic Development, he moved from the 2019–20 SAFA Second Division to the first tier when signing for Chippa United in 2020. He then made his first-tier debut in the 2020-21 South African Premier Division.

As he got a decent amount of starts, he helped Chippa United survive the relegation play-off and reach the 2020–21 Nedbank Cup final. Mohkele was nominated for the Most Promising Player award for the 2020–21 Nedbank Cup. Already in the summer 2021, rumours of a transfer to a bigger club circulated. However, on 6 March 2022, he seriously injured his anterior cruciate ligament in a match against Golden Arrows. He spent a long time in reconvalescence, being released by Chippa United in August 2022. Chippa United was also accused of not paying Mokhele's wages in July 2022.

Nonetheless, Mokhele was wanted by several other clubs, among those Sekhukhune United. He made his debut for Sekhukhune United in August 2023. In 2024 he moved on to Premier Division newcomers Magesi.
