= Waseem Isaacs =

South African soccer player (born 1991)

Personal information
- Date of birth: 16 January 1991 (age 35)
- Place of birth: South Africa
- Position: Forward

Team information
- Current team: La Masia

Senior career*
Years	Team	Apps	(Gls)
2011–2013	MFK Zemplín Michalovce		
2013–2014	Stellenbosch	29	(4)
2014–2015	Marumo Gallants	13	(2)
- Crystal Palace
2016	Cape Town All Stars	12	(1)
2017–2019	Ubuntu Cape Town	64	(17)
2019–2020	Stellenbosch	28	(8)
2020–2021	Cape Town All Stars	27	(5)
2021–2022	Stellenbosch	20	(1)
2022–2023	Moroka Swallows	25	(2)
2024–	La Masia	1	(0)
- * Club domestic league appearances and goals as of 20 March 2024

Waseem Isaacs (born 16 January 1991) is a South African professional soccer player who plays as a forward for La Masia.

== Career ==
Before the second half of 2010–11, Isaacs signed for Slovak side MFK Zemplín Michalovce but left due to religious reasons. In 2013, he signed for Stellenbosch in the South African second tier, where he made 29 league appearances and scored 4 goals. On 18 September 2013, Isaacs debuted for Stellenbosch during a 0-0 draw with Santos (South Africa). After that, Isaacs signed for South African third tier club Crystal Palace.

In 2016, he signed for Cape Town All Stars in the South African second tier. In 2019, he signed for South African top flight team Stellenbosch. In 2020, Isaacs returned to Cape Town All Stars in the South African second tier. In 2021, he returned to South African top flight outfit Stellenbosch.

In summer 2022, Isaacs signed for Moroka Swallows on a two-year contract with an option for a third.
