= Cheslyn Jampies =

South African soccer player

Personal information
- Date of birth: 29 January 1990 (age 36)
- Place of birth: Cape Town, South Africa
- Position: Left-back

Team information
- Current team: TTM

Senior career*
Years	Team	Apps	(Gls)
2011–2015	Santos	78	(1)
2015–2016	Jomo Cosmos	24	(2)
2016-2017	Bloemfontein Celtic	1	(0)
2017–2018	Richards Bay	6	(0)
2018–2019	Steenberg United	11	(1)
2019–2020	Uthongathi	28	(1)
2020–2021	Baroka	20	(0)
2021–2022	Sekhukhune United	17	(0)
2022–	TTM	5	(0)
- * Club domestic league appearances and goals as of 30 October 2022

Cheslyn Jampies (born 29 January 1990) is a South African soccer player who plays as a left-back for TTM.

== Club career ==
Jampies was born in Cape Town. He started his senior career at Santos, before joining Jomo Cosmos at the beginning of the 2015–16 season.

In July 2016, he signed for Bloemfontein Celtic, but he was released by the club in November 2016 after breaching the club's code of conduct.

He signed for Richards Bay in October 2017 following a trial period at the club. He made 4 league appearances at the club before being released at the end of the season.

After spending the first half of the 2018–19 season at Steenberg United, he signed with Uthongathi in January 2019 on an 18-month contract.

He signed with Baroka on a three-year contract in September 2020.

In summer 2021, he signed for newly promoted Premier Division club Sekhukhune United.

== International career ==
He was called up to the South Africa national football team in March 2016, but is yet to play for the national side.

== Style of play ==
He plays as a left-back.
