= Mokhele =

Mokhele is a South African surname. Notable people with the surname include:

- Khotso Mokhele, South African businessman
- Maloisane Mokhele (born 1996), South African soccer player
- Thapelo Mokhele (born 1986), Mosotho footballer

== See also ==
- Thaba Mokhele, a community council located in the Mohale's Hoek District of Lesotho
