= Shane Roberts =

South African soccer player (born 1998)

Personal information
- Date of birth: 18 July 1998 (age 28)
- Place of birth: Cape Town, South Africa
- Height: 1.82 m (6 ft 0 in)
- Position: Midfielder

Team information
- Current team: Royal AM
- Number: 43

Youth career
- –2017: Cape Town City

Senior career*
Years	Team	Apps	(Gls)
2017–2022	Cape Town City	38	(2)
2022	→ TS Galaxy (loan)	3	(0)
2022–	Royal AM	0	(0)
- * Club domestic league appearances and goals as of 15 November 2022

Shane Roberts (born 18 July 1998) is a South African soccer player who plays as a midfielder for Royal AM.

== Career ==
=== Cape Town City ===
A product of the club's youth academy, Roberts made his league debut for the club on 17 February 2018, coming on as a 59th minute substitute for Teko Modise in a 1-0 defeat to the Kaizer Chiefs.
