= Simphiwe Hlongwane =

South African soccer player

Personal information
- Date of birth: 13 June 1993 (age 33)
- Place of birth: Piet Retief, South Africa
- Height: 1.84 m (6 ft 1/2 in)
- Position: Defender

Senior career*
Years	Team	Apps	(Gls)
2015–2020	Polokwane City	93	(0)
2020–	Sekhukhune United	2	(0)
- * Club domestic league appearances and goals as of 08:47, 18 January 2021 (UTC)

Simphiwe Hlongwane (born 13 June 1993) is a South African soccer player who plays as a defender for Sekhukhune United. He was released by the club in summer 2020, following their relegation to the National First Division, and subsequently signed for Sekhukhune United.
