= Kameelrivier Stadium =

Stadium in Kameelrivier, Mpumalanga, South Africa

- Interactive map of Kameelrivier Stadium
- Location: Kameelrivier, Mpumalanga, South Africa
- Capacity: 4/8,000

Kameelrivier Stadium is a stadium in Kameelrivier.

The stadium is used for soccer matches. It was used by TS Galaxy in the past, and was used by Leicesterford City during the 2025–26 National First Division.
