= George Matlou =

South African soccer player

Personal information
- Full name: Lehlogonolo George Matlou
- Date of birth: 12 July 1998 (age 28)
- Place of birth: Soweto, South Africa
- Height: 1.85 m (6 ft 1 in)
- Position: Midfielder

Team information
- Current team: Kaizer Chiefs
- Number: 22

Youth career
- Charlton Athletic
- Orlando Pirates
- Bidvest Wits

Senior career*
Years	Team	Apps	(Gls)
2017–2019	Bidvest Wits	0	(0)
2017–2018	→ Cape Town All Stars (loan)	5	(0)
2018–2019	→ Cape Umoya United (loan)	18	(1)
2019–2021	Sanjoanense	39	(2)
2021–2022	Moroka Swallows	17	(0)
2022–	Kaizer Chiefs	33	(0)

International career^{‡}
- South Africa U20
2022	South Africa	1	(0)
- * Club domestic league appearances and goals as of 4 January 2026 ‡ National team caps and goals as of 5 April 2024

Lehlogonolo George Matlou (born 12 July 1998) is a South African soccer player who plays as a midfielder for Kaizer Chiefs in the Premier Soccer League.

Born in Soweto, Matlou was an U14 player at Orlando Pirates before joining the U15 team of Bidvest Wits in 2013. He overcame a career-threatening leg break which he suffered during the Metropolitan school tournament. Matlou came back to play for South Africa U20, among others in the 2017 COSAFA U-20 Cup. Following National First Division loan stints with Cape Town All Stars and Cape Umoya United, Bidvest Wits went defunct and Matlou went to Portugal to play for Sanjoanense in the third tier. In 2021 he claimed to have been called a "little monkey" by a referee.

Returning to South Africa and Moroka Swallows, he made his first-tier debut in the 2021-22 South African Premier Division. He impressed enough, being called a "ball wizard" by The South African, to be bought by Kaizer Chiefs in the summer of 2022. He was called up for South Africa to play a 2022 African Nations Championship qualification match against the Comoros.

Matlou struggled to break through and establish himself as a regular in Kaizer Chiefs. In 2024 it was reported that Kaizer Chiefs would not renew Matlou's contract, due to expire in the summer.
