= Watersmeet =

Watersmeet is an old word meaning the confluence of two rivers. It may refer to

- Watersmeet House, a former fishing lodge and current information centre located near Lynmouth, Devon, England
- Watersmeet SSSI, a Site of Special Scientific Interest located near Lynmouth, Devon, England
- Watersmeet theatre, a theatre complex in Rickmansworth, Hertfordshire, England
- Watersmeet Township, Michigan, a civil township of Gogebic County, Michigan, United States
  - Watersmeet, Michigan, an unincorporated community within the township
- Watersmeet, KwaZulu-Natal, a town in the KwaZulu-Natal Province, South Africa
