= Renaldo Leaner =

South African footballer (born 1998)

Personal information
- Date of birth: 12 February 1998 (age 28)
- Place of birth: Elsie's River, Western Cape, South Africa
- Height: 1.87 m (6 ft 2 in)
- Position: Goalkeeper

Team information
- Current team: Kaizer Chiefs

Youth career
- –2020: Cape Town Spurs

Senior career*
Years	Team	Apps	(Gls)
2020–2021	Cape Town Spurs		
2021–2023	Maritzburg United		
2023–2026	Sekhukhune United F.C.		
2026–	Kaizer Chiefs		

International career
2025–	South Africa	3	(0)
- * Club domestic league appearances and goals

Renaldo Leaner (born 12 February 1998) is a South African soccer player who plays as a goalkeeper for Premier Soccer League side Sekhukhune United and the South Africa national team.

== Club career ==
=== Maritzburg United ===
He signed for Maritzburg United ahead of the 2021/2022 season from Cape Town Spurs.

=== Sekhukhune United ===
He signed a three-year deal with Sekhukhune United in 2023.

=== Kaizer Cheifs ===
He signed deal with Soweto Giants Kaizer Cheifs in 2026. As Amakhosi is strengthening its Goalkeeping department ahead of the new season

== International career ==
He made his international debut against Tanzania on 6 June 2025. He was called up for his third cap against Panama on 31 March 2026 coming in for captain Ronwen Williams during half time.

== Personal life ==
Leaner gradudated with a Bachelor of Education from the University of the Western Cape and has a Sports Psychology qualification from the University of South Africa. He also holds a higher certificate in Sports Sciences from the University of Pretoria.
