= Ronaldo Maarman =

South African soccer player

Personal information
- Full name: Ronaldo Claudio Maarman
- Date of birth: 29 November 1999 (age 26)
- Position: Midfielder

Team information
- Current team: Sekhukhune United
- Number: 27

Youth career
- Chippa United

Senior career*
Years	Team	Apps	(Gls)
2019–2021	Chippa United	0	(0)
2020–2021	→ Cape Town All Stars (loan)	16	(4)
2021–2023	Orlando Pirates	0	(0)
2021–2022	→ Cape Town All Stars (loan)	24	(2)
2022–2023	→ Chippa United (loan)	23	(3)
2023–2025	Chippa United	36	(2)
2025–	Sekhukhune United	5	(1)
- * Club domestic league appearances and goals as of 4 January 2026

Ronaldo Maarman (born 29 November 1999) is a South African soccer player who plays as a midfielder for Sekhukhune United in the South African Premier Division.

Maarman came through the academy of Chippa United and played in the Diski Challenge Shield. While waiting to make his first-team debut, in 2020–2021 he was loaned out to First Division club Cape Town All Stars. After showing his potential there, he was signed by Orlando Pirates in the summer of 2021. The major South African club immediately sent him on his second loan to Cape Town All Stars. With Maarman, All Stars reached the playoffs to the Premier Division, but did not succeed.

The next season, Maarman was loaned out again, this time to his old club Chippa United. He made his first-tier debut in the 2022–23 South African Premier Division. In the summer of 2023, both Chippa United and possibly other clubs wanted to sign Maarman permanently. In August 2023 Chippa United managed to complete the transfer.
