= Mlungisi Mbunjana =

South African soccer player

Mlungisi
Personal information
- Full name: Mbunjana
- Date of birth: 26 August 1990 (age 36)
- Height: 1.78 m (5 ft 10 in)
- Position: Midfielder

Team information
- Current team: TS Galaxy
- Number: 8

Senior career*
Years	Team	Apps	(Gls)
2015–2018	Cape Town All Stars	73	(4)
2018–2020	Highlands Park	24	(1)
2020–	TS Galaxy	141	(4)
- * Club domestic league appearances and goals as of 4 January 2026

Mlungisi Mbunjana (born 26 August 1990) is a South African soccer player who plays as a midfielder for South African Premier Division side TS Galaxy.
