= 2013–14 SAFA Second Division =

SAFA Second Division
- Season: 2013–14
- Champions: Cape Town All Stars
- Promoted: Cape Town All Stars; Highlands Park

The 2013–14 SAFA Second Division (known as the ABC Motsepe League for sponsorship reasons) was the 16th season of the SAFA Second Division, the third tier league for South African association football clubs, since its establishment in 1998. Due to the size of South Africa, the competition is split into nine divisions, one for each region. After the league stage of the regional competition was completed, the nine teams are placed into two 'streams', sometimes referred to as the Inland and Coastal streams.

It was won by Cape Town All Stars, who beat Highlands Park on penalties in the playoff final. Both teams were promoted to the 2014-15 National First Division.

In March 2014, the Motsepe Foundation signed an agreement to sponsor the competition, with a prize money of R1 million for the winning team, and R500 000 for the runners-up
