= Thabo Moloisane =

South African soccer player (born 1999)

Personal information
- Full name: Thabo Brendon Moloisane
- Date of birth: 24 February 1999 (age 27)
- Height: 1.78 m (5 ft 10 in)
- Position: Defender

Team information
- Current team: Kaizer Chiefs

Youth career
- –2020: Mamelodi Sundowns

Senior career*
Years	Team	Apps	(Gls)
2020–2022	Cape Town All Stars	50	(0)
2022–2023	Maritzburg United	26	(0)
2023–2026	Stellenbosch	64	(3)
2026-	Kaizer Chiefs	0	(0)

International career^{‡}
- South Africa U20
- South Africa
- * Club domestic league appearances and goals as of 4 January 2026 ‡ National team caps and goals as of 29 June 2024

Thabo Moloisane (born 24 February 1999) is a South African soccer player who plays as a defender for Kaizer Chiefs in the Premier Soccer League.

He was a youth player for Mamelodi Sundowns, and played for South Africa U20, among others at the 2019 U-20 Africa Cup of Nations, the 2019 FIFA U-20 World Cup and the 2019 African Games.

As a senior player, Moloisane played for Cape Town All Stars in the second tier and was team captain. In 2022 he moved to Maritzburg United, making his first-tier debut, but the team was relegated from the 2022-23 South African Premier Division. Moloisane stayed in the top flight, as he was signed by Stellenbosch in July 2023. His first achievement in Stellenbosch was reaching the final of the Carling Black Label Cup and then winning the final against TS Galaxy.

After the 2024 season concluded, he was selected for the 2024 COSAFA Cup. He made his Bafana Bafana debut against Mozambique.

His contract with Stellenbosch F.C. expired in May 2026 and he joined Kaizer Chiefs F.C as a free agent.
