= Sibusiso Magaqa =

South African soccer player

Personal information
- Full name: Sibusiso Victor Magaqa
- Date of birth: 2 November 1998 (age 28)
- Place of birth: Tongaat, South Africa
- Position: Midfielder

Team information
- Current team: Royal AM
- Number: 26

Youth career
- –2016: AmaZulu

Senior career*
Years	Team	Apps	(Gls)
2015–2023	AmaZulu	34	(0)
2015–2016	→ Sgcino Cosmos (loan)	0	(0)
2018–2019	→ Uthongathi (loan)	18	(1)
2021	→ Royal AM (loan)	18	(0)
2023–	Royal AM	23	(0)
- * Club domestic league appearances and goals as of 15 June 2024

Sibusiso Victor Magaqa (born 2 November 1998) is a South African professional soccer player who currently plays as a midfielder for Royal AM in the South African Premier Division.

== Early and personal life ==
He was born in Tongaat.

== Club career ==
Magaqa started his career at the academy of AmaZulu, joining at the under-13 level. He made his first-team debut as a substitute against Highlands Park in the final match of the 2015–16 season after a full season at Sgcino Cosmos.

In January 2018, he joined Uthongathi on loan, with his loan deal extended in the summer of that year.
