= Sibusiso Mbonani =

South African soccer player

Personal information
- Date of birth: 10 June 1987 (age 39)
- Place of birth: Dennilton, South Africa
- Position: Defender

Senior career*
Years	Team	Apps	(Gls)
2012–2015	Witbank Spurs	70	(1)
2015–2020	Polokwane City	102	(2)
2020–2022	Sekhukhune United	29	(0)
- * Club domestic league appearances and goals as of 30 October 2022

Sibusiso Mbonani (born 10 June 1987) is a South African soccer player who last played as a defender for South African Premier Division side Sekhukhune United.

== Career ==
He signed for Polokwane City in July 2015.
