= Siphesihle =

Siphesihle or Sphesihle/S'phesihle is a unisex given name. The name means "beautiful gift". Notable people with the name include:

- Siphesihle Dlamini (born 2002), South African soccer player
- Sphesihle Maduna (born 1999), South African soccer player
- Siphesihle Mkhize (born 1999), South African soccer player
- Siphesihle Ndlovu (born 1996), South African professional soccer player
- Siphesihle November (born 1998 or 1999), South African ballet dancer.
- Siphesihle Ntuli, South African field hockey coach.
- Siphesihle Punguzwa (born 1993), South African rugby union player
- Sphesihle Zondi (born 1995), South African politician
