= Farai Madhanaga =

Zimbabwean footballer (born 1995)

Personal information
- Full name: Farai Edwin Madhanaga
- Date of birth: 14 February 1995 (age 31)
- Place of birth: Harare, Zimbabwe
- Height: 1.68 m (5 ft 6 in)
- Position: Left-back

Team information
- Current team: Tshakhuma Tsha Madzivhandila

Senior career*
Years	Team	Apps	(Gls)
2013–2014	Monomotapa United F.C.		
2014–2016	Flame Lily FC		
2016–2018	Harare City F.C.		
2018–2019	F.C. Platinum		
2019–2020	Bidvest Wits	0	(0)
2020–	Tshakhuma Tsha Madzivhandila		

International career^{‡}
2016–2018	Zimbabwe	8	(0)
- * Club domestic league appearances and goals as of 22 March 2019 ‡ National team caps and goals as of 22 March 2019

Farai Edwin Madhanaga (born 14 February 1995) is a Zimbabwean footballer who plays as a defender for Tshakhuma Tsha Madzivhandila and the Zimbabwe national football team.
