= Sphesihle Maduna =

South African soccer player

Personal information
- Date of birth: 26 December 1999 (age 26)
- Place of birth: Watersmeet, South Africa
- Position: Midfielder

Team information
- Current team: TS Galaxy
- Number: 10

Youth career
- 2012–2014: Lamontville Golden Arrows
- 2016–2018: AmaZulu

Senior career*
Years	Team	Apps	(Gls)
2018–2024	AmaZulu	77	(7)
2024	Cape Town Spurs	6	(0)
2024–	TS Galaxy	32	(1)
- * Club domestic league appearances and goals as of 4 January 2026

Sphesihle Maduna (born 26 December 1999) is a South African soccer player who plays as a midfielder for South African Premier Division side TS Galaxy.

Maduna was born in Watersmeet. He played youth football with Lamontville Golden Arrows between 2012 and 2014, before joining AmaZulu's youth team in 2016. He was promoted to AmaZulu's senior squad in February 2018, at the age of 18.

In 2024 he was named in Bafana Bafana's preliminary squad for the 2024 COSAFA Cup. After a short-term contract with the Cape Town Spurs, that club was relegated and Maduna went on to TS Galaxy.
