= King Ndlovu =

South African soccer player (born 1993)

Kgosietsile King Ndlovu
Personal information
- Date of birth: 20 March 1993 (age 33)
- Place of birth: Ga-Rankuwa, South Africa
- Height: 1.84 m (6 ft 1/2 in)
- Position: Goalkeeper

Team information
- Current team: Pretoria Callies

Youth career
- SuperSport United

Senior career*
| Years | Team | Apps | (Gls) |
| 2013–2014 | Roses United | 1 | (0) |
| 2015–2016 | FC Cape Town | 6 | (0) |
| 2016–2018 | Jomo Cosmos | 32 | (0) |
| 2018–2021 | Black Leopards | 44 | (0) |
| 2021–2022 | Marumo Gallants | 9 | (0) |
| 2022–2023 | Maritzburg United | 15 | (0) |
| 2023–2024 | Marumo Gallants | 11 | (0) |
| 2024– | Pretoria Callies | 0 | (0) |
- * Club domestic league appearances and goals as of 18 November 2024

Kgosietsile King Ndlovu (born 20 March 1993) is a South African soccer player who plays as a goalkeeper for South African First Division side Pretoria Callies.

== Career ==
Born in Ga-Rankuwa, Ndlovu played youth football for SuperSport United, before becoming professional in 2014. As a professional, Ndlovu has played for Roses United, FC Cape Town, Jomo Cosmos and Black Leopards.
