= Tapuwa Kapini =

Zimbabwean footballer (born 1984)

Personal information
- Date of birth: 17 July 1984 (age 42)
- Place of birth: Harare, Zimbabwe
- Height: 1.78 m (5 ft 10 in)
- Position: Goalkeeper

Senior career*
Years	Team	Apps	(Gls)
2001–2006	Highlanders FC	200	(11)
2006–2011	Platinum Stars	82	(0)
2011–2015	AmaZulu	61	(0)
2015–2020	Highlands Park F.C.	28	(1)
2020–2022	Sekhukhune United	21	(0)

International career
2001–2013	Zimbabwe	43	(0)
- * Club domestic league appearances and goals

Tapuwa Kapini (born 17 August 1984) is a Zimbabwean former professional footballer who played as a goalkeeper. He represented the Zimbabwe national team at international level, making 43 appearances.

He is known in Zimbabwe for his style of play where he drives the ball into the center of the pitch like an outfield player.

On 10 February 2015, Kapini joined Highlands Park F.C. on a free transfer.
