= Ndiviwe Mdabuka =

South African soccer player

Personal information
- Date of birth: 12 March 1991 (age 35)
- Position: Midfielder

Youth career
- Ajax Cape Town

Senior career*
Years	Team	Apps	(Gls)
2013–2015	Vasco da Gama	52	(5)
2015–2018	Ajax Cape Town	72	(2)
2018–2019	Maccabi	21	(0)
2019–2020	Cape Umoya United	26	(3)
2020–2022	Cape Town All Stars	80	(17)
2022–2023	Richards Bay	13	(0)
- * Club domestic league appearances and goals as of 1 August 2023

Ndiviwe Mdabuka (born 12 March 1991) is a South African soccer player who played as a midfielder.

== Career ==
Mdabuka was a member of Ajax Cape Town's academy before making his senior breakthrough at Vasco da Gama in the National First Division. He was signed by Ajax Cape Town in 2015 to make his first-tier debut in the 2015-16 South African Premier Division.

His Ajax Cape Town debut came in the 2015 MTN 8 against Orlando Pirates, where he scored the only goal in a 1–0 victory. Ajax Cape Town went on to win the competition. Over the next two years, Mdabuka was a regular player. Under Ajax Cape Town's last coach of 2017–18, Muhsin Ertuğral, Mdabuka lost the confidence of the manager and was told that he was not a part of Ertuğral's plans for the squad. Mdabuka trained with Bidvest Wits and was considered by Highlands Park before settling back in the First Division with Maccabi.

Following short spells in Maccabi and Cape Umoya United, Mdabuka joined the Cape Town All Stars in 2020. His stay at Cape Town All Stars ended with the team taking a place in the playoffs and Mdabuka becoming top goalscorer in the team. With Chippa United reportedly being interested in the player, Mdabuka joined Richards Bay in the summer of 2022 to once again play in the South African Premier Division. However he only started one match, and was released in 2023.
