= Vuyo Mere =

South African soccer player

Personal information
- Full name: Vuyo Calvin Mere
- Date of birth: 5 March 1984 (age 42)
- Place of birth: Bloemfontein, South Africa
- Position: Right back

Team information
- Current team: TS Galaxy (assistant)

Youth career
- Manguang United
- –2001: Hellenic

Senior career*
Years	Team	Apps	(Gls)
2001–2004	Hellenic	34	(0)
2004–2011	Mamelodi Sundowns	136	(1)
2011	→ Swallows (loan)	16	(0)
2011–2018	Platinum Stars	184	(7)
2018–2019	Bidvest Wits	20	(0)
2019–2021	Swallows	54	(1)
2021–2024	TS Galaxy	6	(0)

International career
2006–2007	South Africa	10	(0)

Managerial career
- 2024–: TS Galaxy (assistant)
- * Club domestic league appearances and goals

Vuyo Mere (born 5 March 1984) is a South African soccer player who plays as a defender for Premier Soccer League club TS Galaxy.

In 2024, Mere retired from soccer at the age of 40. He was retained by TS Galaxy, entering their coaching staff. Mere became assistant manager of their Diski Challenge Shield team under his former teammate Bernard Parker. Mere was also named as one of three assistant coaches to first-team manager Sead Ramovic.

Titles: 2 Premier League Winner
