= Mxolisi Macuphu =

South African soccer player

Personal information
- Date of birth: 12 May 1989 (age 37)
- Place of birth: Johannesburg, South Africa
- Height: 1.81 m (5 ft 11 in)
- Position: Striker

Team information
- Current team: Royal AM
- Number: 9

Senior career*
Years	Team	Apps	(Gls)
2010–2013	Golden Arrows	18	(2)
2013–2014	Bay United	1	(0)
2014–2015	Sivutsa Stars	12	(3)
2015–2017	Jomo Cosmos	57	(13)
2018	Chippa United	13	(4)
2018–2020	Bidvest Wits	33	(4)
2019	→ SuperSport United (loan)	11	(5)
2020–2021	TS Galaxy	42	(8)
2022–	Royal AM	32	(6)
- * Club domestic league appearances and goals as of 8 July 2023

Mxolisi Macuphu (born 12 May 1989) is a South African professional soccer player who plays as a striker for Royal AM in the Premier Soccer League.

He was called up to South Africa's squad in 2018, but has not achieved his first international cap.
