= Parow Park =

Sports venue in Cape Town, South Africa

- Interactive map of Parow Park
- Location: Cape Town
- Coordinates: 33.8951071°S 18.578871°E
- Capacity: 2,000

Parow Park is a sports venue in Cape Town, South Africa.

The venue has hosted football matches for several teams Premier Soccer League and National First Division teams, including Cape Town All Stars, Santos F.C., Stellenbosch F.C., Ubuntu Cape Town.
