= Edmore Sibanda =

Zimbabwean footballer (1984–2026)

Personal information
- Date of birth: 3 April 1986 (age 40)
- Place of birth: Mvuma, Zimbabwe
- Height: 1.81 m (5 ft 11 in)
- Position: Goalkeeper

Senior career*
Years	Team	Apps	(Gls)
2006–2008	Chapungu United		
2008–2017	CAPS United		
2015	→ Gunners (loan)		
2017–2019	Witbank Spurs	18	(0)
2019–2021	Golden Arrows	14	(0)
2021–2022	Tshakhuma Tsha Madzivhandila	12	(0)
- Yadah Stars

International career
2008–2019	Zimbabwe	16	(0)
- * Club domestic league appearances and goals

Edmore Sibanda (born 3 April 1986) is a Zimbabwean former professional footballer who played as a goalkeeper for clubs in Zimbabwe and South Africa as well as the Zimbabwe national team.
