= Augustine Chidi Kwem =

Nigerian footballer

Personal information
- Full name: Augustine Chidi Kwem
- Date of birth: 2 August 1997 (age 29)
- Height: 1.87 m (6 ft 2 in)
- Position: Forward

Team information
- Current team: Mash'al
- Number: 97

Youth career
- 2016: Beitar Jerusalem

Senior career*
Years	Team	Apps	(Gls)
2017	Polokwane City Rovers		
2018	Mthatha Bucks		
2019	Sibanye		
2019–2021	Chippa United	51	(9)
2021–2022	TS Galaxy	17	(3)
2022–2024	AmaZulu	40	(9)
2024–2025	Hanoi	5	(1)
2025	Al-Naft	5	(0)
2026–	Mash'al	10	(0)
- * Club domestic league appearances and goals as of 29 July 2026

Augustine Chidi Kwem (born 2 August 1997) is a Nigerian professional footballer who plays as a forward for Uzbekistan Super League club Mash'al.

== Career ==
Chidi Kwem was born in Nigeria and played youth football for Beitar Jerusalem before moving to South Africa in October 2018. He trained with University of Johannesburg, and had spells with Polokwane City Rovers, Mthatha Bucks and Sibanye before joining Chippa United on a one-year contract in July 2019. He signed a three-year contract extension in October 2020.

In May 2021, Chidi Kwem signed for TS Galaxy for an undisclosed fee on a two-year contract, with the option for a further two years.

On 19 August 2024, Chidi Kwem joined V.League 1 side Hanoi FC, signing a one-year contract.
