= 2020 Telkom Knockout =

Tournament details
- Country: South Africa

The 2020 Telkom Knockout was due to be the 39th edition of the Telkom Knockout, a South African cup competition comprising the 16 teams in the Premier Soccer League. However, it was cancelled after the loss of sponsor Telkom.

Premier Soccer League chairman Irvin Khoza described the cancellation as a "blessing in disguise," due to the relief on fixture congestion caused by the COVID-19 pandemic in South Africa.

After a gap of a further two seasons, the tournament found a new sponsor and was held again as the 2023 Carling Knockout Cup.
