= Ashley Cupido =

South African soccer player

Personal information
- Date of birth: 5 May 2001 (age 25)
- Place of birth: Cape Town, South Africa
- Height: 1.76 m (5 ft 9 in)
- Positions: Forward; winger

Team information
- Current team: Stellenbosch
- Number: 9

Youth career
- –2020: Ajax Cape Town

Senior career*
Years	Team	Apps	(Gls)
2020–2024	Cape Town Spurs	112	(30)
2024–	Stellenbosch	34	(5)

International career^{‡}
2022–	South Africa	6	(1)
- * Club domestic league appearances and goals as of 4 January 2026 ‡ National team caps and goals as of 24 October 2024

Ashley Cupido (born 5 May 2001) is a South African soccer player who plays as a forward for Stellenbosch in the South African Premier Division.

He won a senior contract with Ajax Cape Town, as the club was named at the time, in 2020. As the club severed ties with Ajax AFC and became Cape Town Spurs, Cupido established himself in the first team that avoided relegation to the Second Division in both 2020–21 and 2022–22 and eventually contended for promotion to the Premier Division.

When Cupido scored double digits in the 2022-23 National First Division, there were rumours about joining a bigger team, whereas Cape Town Spurs would rather sell the player to Europe on a future date. Transfer rumours continued after the "Urban Warriors" were promoted to the 2023-24 South African Premier Division, and were only mitigated by the Cape Town Spurs being relegated at the end of the season.

Cupido was capped for the first time in 2022, playing in a 2022 African Nations Championship qualification match against the Comoros. He was later called up for the 2024 COSAFA Cup, and featured in the first match against Mozambique.

One of Cupido's strengths is his top speed.

In 2024, Cupido completed a move to Stellenbosch.

== International goals ==
No.	Date	Venue	Opponent	Score	Result	Competition
1.	10 June 2025	Peter Mokaba Stadium, Polokwane, South Africa	Mozambique	2–0	2–0	Friendly
