= Sandile Mthethwa =

South African soccer player

Personal information
- Full name: Sandile Mthethwa
- Date of birth: 14 April 1997 (age 29)
- Place of birth: Ngwelezane, South Africa
- Height: 6 ft 2 in (1.87 m)
- Position: Centre-back

Team information
- Current team: AmaZulu
- Number: 39

Youth career
- –2011: Shooting Stars
- 2013–2016: KZN Academy

Senior career*
Years	Team	Apps	(Gls)
2011–2013	Flamengo FC		
2013–2016	Durban FC		
2016–2024	Orlando Pirates	13	(1)
2017–2019	→ Richards Bay (loan)	43	(4)
2019–2021	→ Chippa United (loan)	30	(1)
2021–2022	→ Chippa United (loan)	23	(1)
2024–	AmaZulu	23	(0)

International career^{‡}
2017	South Africa U20	6	(0)
2017–2019	South Africa	7	(0)
- * Club domestic league appearances and goals as of 05:13, 13 November 2025 (UTC) ‡ National team caps and goals as of 30 October 2022

Sandile Mthethwa (born 14 April 1997) is a South African professional soccer player who plays as a centre-back for AmaZulu and formerly the South Africa national football team.

== Club career ==
Mthethwa was born in Ngwelezane, on the outskirts of Empangeni in KwaZulu-Natal. Mthethwa started his youth career at Shooting Stars, before playing for Flamengo FC of the SAFA Regional League between 2011 and 2013. He signed for the KZN Academy in 2013, and played for partner club Durban FC.

In May 2015, it was announced that Mthethwa had joined CS Maritimo on a one-year deal, but instead signed for Orlando Pirates in early 2016. He joined Richards Bay on loan in summer 2017, where he made 17 league appearances during the 2017–18 season. He returned to Richards Bay for a further season in summer 2018, and scored 4 goals across 26 appearances over the course of the 2018–19 season.

In July 2019, he joined Chippa United on a season-long loan. He made 8 appearances for Chippa United across the 2019–20 season. He returned to the club on loan for the 2020–21 season.

In August 2021, it was announced that he had returned to Chippa United on loan for a third season.

He left Orlando Pirates on 13 December 2024 after agreeing an "amicable separation" with the club.

Mthethwa signed for AmaZulu on a free transfer four days later.

== International career ==
Mthethwa has represented South Africa at both under-20 and senior international levels.

== Style of play ==
Mthethwa plays as a centre-back.
