= Peter Shalulile =

Namibian footballer (born 1993)

Personal information
- Full name: Peter Shalulile
- Date of birth: 23 October 1993 (age 33)
- Place of birth: Windhoek, Namibia
- Height: 1.74 m (5 ft 9 in)
- Position: Striker

Team information
- Current team: Young Africans
- Number: 13

Senior career*
| Years | Team | Apps | (Gls) |
| 2011–2015 | Tura Magic | | |
| 2015–2020 | Highlands Park | 117 | (44) |
| 2020–2026 | Mamelodi Sundowns | 134 | (68) |
| 2026– | Young Africans | 5 | (3) |

International career^{‡}
| 2014– | Namibia | 72 | (22) |
- * Club domestic league appearances and goals ‡ National team caps and goals as of 16 November 2026 (UTC)

Peter Shalulile (born 23 October 1993) is a Namibian professional footballer who plays as a striker for Tanzanian Premier League club Young Africans and captains the Namibia national team. He is regarded as one of the best strikers to play in the South Africa top flight, having become the league's all-time top scorer during his stints with Highlands Park and Mamelodi Sundowns.

== Club career ==
=== Tura Magic ===
Shalulile is a product of Tura Magic FC in Namibia, a club he joined when they were campaigning in the NFA Khomas second division andhelped gain promotion in the 2011–12 season.

=== Highlands Park ===
Shalulile joined National First Division club Highlands Park after an impressive showing at the 2015 COSAFA Cup, and helped them gain promotion, scoring two crucial goals in the playoff encounter against Mbombela at the Makhulong Stadium in June 2016.

Midway through the 2019–20 season, the media speculated that Shalulile was being hunted by three of South Africa's biggest clubs, Mamelodi Sundowns, Kaizer Chiefs and Orlando Pirates, due to his goalscoring abilities. He finished the season as joint top goalscorer alongside Orlando Pirates' Gabadinho Mhango.

=== Mamelodi Sundowns ===
Shalulile signed for Mamelodi Sundowns at the end of the season. He scored four goals in his first seven league appearances. Shalulile is the third Namibian player to join Mamelodi Sundowns after Ronnie 'The Magnet' Fillemon Kanalelo, who played for Sundowns between 1997 and 2005 and left winger Mohale Naruseb.

On 22 April 2023 against CR Belouizdad in the CAF Champions League quarter-finals, Shalulile became the latest player to join the list of prominent players who have managed to bag 100 goals or more in the Premiership, joining the likes of Siyabonga Nomvethe, Bradley Grobler, Collins Mbesuma and Masandawana's all-time top goal scorer, Daniel Mudau.

=== Young Africans ===
Shalulile signed for Tanzanian Premier League champions Young Africans in July 2026, with a signing fee of $700,000.

== International career ==
Shalulile was a member of the Namibian under-19 squad that won the Metropolitan Under-19 Premier Cup in South Africa in 2011. He then made his way up from the under-20 to the senior Namibia national team, and would score a crucial semi-final goal en route to the team's first ever trophy, the COSAFA Cup in 2015.

== Career statistics ==
=== Club ===
As of match played 6 May 2026

Appearances and goals by club, season and competition
| Club | Season | League | | | Nedbank Cup | | MTN 8 | | CAF Champions League | | Other | | Total | |
| Club | Season | Division | Apps | Goals | Apps | Goals | Apps | Goals | Apps | Goals | Apps | Goals | Apps | Goals |
|---|---|---|---|---|---|---|---|---|---|---|---|---|---|---|
| Highlands Park | 2015–16 | National First Division | 20 | 5 | 2 | 0 | 0 | 0 | — | | 1 | 2 | 23 | 7 |
| Highlands Park | 2017–18 | National First Division | 29 | 15 | 1 | 0 | 0 | 0 | — | | 0 | 0 | 30 | 15 |
| Highlands Park | 2016–17 | South African Premiership | 14 | 1 | 1 | 0 | 0 | 0 | — | | 0 | 0 | 15 | 1 |
| Highlands Park | 2018–19 | South African Premiership | 24 | 7 | 2 | 0 | 0 | 0 | — | | 1 | 0 | 27 | 7 |
| Highlands Park | 2019–20 | South African Premiership | 30 | 16 | 3 | 3 | 4 | 0 | — | | 2 | 0 | 39 | 19 |
| Highlands Park | Total | | 117 | 44 | 9 | 3 | 4 | 0 | 0 | 0 | 4 | 2 | 134 | 49 |
| Mamelodi Sundowns | 2020–21 | South African Premiership | 25 | 15 | 4 | 4 | 1 | 0 | 9 | 3 | 0 | 0 | 39 | 22 |
| Mamelodi Sundowns | 2021–22 | South African Premiership | 30 | 23 | 3 | 2 | 4 | 2 | 9 | 3 | 0 | 0 | 46 | 30 |
| Mamelodi Sundowns | 2022–23 | South African Premiership | 21 | 12 | 3 | 5 | 2 | 0 | 8 | 6 | 0 | 0 | 34 | 23 |
| Mamelodi Sundowns | 2023–24 | South African Premiership | 21 | 9 | 3 | 0 | 3 | 2 | 11 | 3 | 1 | 1 | 39 | 15 |
| Mamelodi Sundowns | 2024–25 | South African Premiership | 24 | 6 | 3 | 0 | 3 | 0 | 4 | 0 | 4 | 2 | 38 | 8 |
| Mamelodi Sundowns | 2025–26 | South African Premiership | 13 | 3 | 2 | 1 | 2 | 0 | 1 | 0 | 5 | 2 | 23 | 6 |
| Mamelodi Sundowns | Total | | 134 | 68 | 18 | 12 | 15 | 4 | 42 | 15 | 10 | 5 | 219 | 104 |
| Career total | | | 251 | 112 | 27 | 15 | 19 | 4 | 42 | 15 | 14 | 7 | 353 | 153 |

=== International ===
As of match played 16 November 2026

Appearances and goals by national team and year
| National team | Year | Apps | Goals |
|---|---|---|---|
| Namibia | 2014 | 1 | 0 |
| Namibia | 2015 | 12 | 1 |
| Namibia | 2016 | 6 | 2 |
| Namibia | 2017 | 5 | 3 |
| Namibia | 2018 | 3 | 1 |
| Namibia | 2019 | 9 | 3 |
| Namibia | 2020 | 3 | 0 |
| Namibia | 2021 | 7 | 4 |
| Namibia | 2022 | 1 | 1 |
| Namibia | 2023 | 3 | 3 |
| Namibia | 2024 | 11 | 0 |
| Namibia | 2025 | 6 | 4 |
| Namibia | 2026 | 5 | 0 |
| Total | | 72 | 22 |

Namibia score listed first, score column indicates score after each Shalulile goal.

List of international goals scored by Peter Shalulile
| No. | Date | Venue | Opponent | Score | Result | Competition |
|---|---|---|---|---|---|---|
| 1 | 28 May 2015 | Moruleng Stadium, Saulspoort, South Africa | Madagascar | 3–2 | 3–2 | 2015 COSAFA Cup |
| 2 | 26 March 2016 | Prince Louis Rwagasore Stadium, Bujumbura, Burundi | Burundi | 2–0 | 3–1 | 2017 Africa Cup of Nations qualification |
| 3 | 4 June 2016 | Sam Nujoma Stadium, Windhoek, Namibia | Niger | 1–0 | 1–0 | 2017 Africa Cup of Nations qualification |
| 4 | 7 October 2017 | Sam Nujoma Stadium, Windhoek, Namibia | Botswana | 1–1 | 3–1 | Friendly |
| 5 | 7 October 2017 | Sam Nujoma Stadium, Windhoek, Namibia | Botswana | 2–1 | 3–1 | Friendly |
| 6 | 11 November 2017 | Sam Nujoma Stadium, Windhoek, Namibia | Zimbabwe | 2–0 | 3–1 | Friendly |
| 7 | 16 October 2018 | Sam Nujoma Stadium, Windhoek, Namibia | Mozambique | 1–0 | 1–0 | 2019 Africa Cup of Nations qualification |
| 8 | 23 March 2019 | National Heroes Stadium, Lusaka, Zambia | Zambia | 1–3 | 1–4 | 2019 Africa Cup of Nations qualification |
| 9 | 4 September 2019 | Denden Stadium, Asmara, Eritrea | Eritrea | 1–0 | 2–1 | 2022 FIFA World Cup qualification |
| 10 | 10 September 2019 | Sam Nujoma Stadium, Windhoek, Namibia | Eritrea | 2–0 | 2–0 | 2022 FIFA World Cup qualification |
| 11 | 28 March 2021 | Sam Nujoma Stadium, Windhoek, Namibia | Guinea | 1–0 | 2–1 | 2021 Africa Cup of Nations qualification |
| 12 | 28 March 2021 | Sam Nujoma Stadium, Windhoek, Namibia | Guinea | 2–0 | 2–1 | 2021 Africa Cup of Nations qualification |
| 13 | 12 October 2021 | Orlando Stadium, Johannesburg, South Africa | Senegal | 1–1 | 2–2 | 2022 FIFA World Cup qualification |
| 14 | 11 November 2021 | Stade Alphonse Massemba-Débat, Brazzaville, Republic of the Congo | Congo | 1–1 | 1–1 | 2022 FIFA World Cup qualification |
| 15 | 4 June 2022 | Orlando Stadium, Soweto, South Africa | Burundi | 1–0 | 1–1 | 2023 Africa Cup of Nations qualification |
| 16 | 24 March 2023 | Ahmadou Ahidjo Stadium, Yaoundé, Cameroon | Cameroon | 1–0 | 1–1 | 2023 Africa Cup of Nations qualification |
| 17 | 28 March 2023 | Dobsonville Stadium, Johannesburg, South Africa | Cameroon | 1–0 | 2–1 | 2023 Africa Cup of Nations qualification |
| 18 | 20 June 2023 | National Stadium, Dar es Salaam, Tanzania | Burundi | 1–3 | 2–3 | 2023 Africa Cup of Nations qualification |
| 19 | 24 March 2025 | Orlando Stadium, Johannesburg, South Africa | Equatorial Guinea | 1–0 | 1–1 | 2026 FIFA World Cup qualification |
| 20 | 9 September 2025 | Obed Itani Chilume Stadium, Francistown, Botswana | São Tomé and Príncipe | 1–0 | 3–0 | 2026 FIFA World Cup qualification |
| 21 | 9 September 2025 | Obed Itani Chilume Stadium, Francistown, Botswana | São Tomé and Príncipe | 2–0 | 3–0 | 2026 FIFA World Cup qualification |
| 22 | 9 September 2025 | Obed Itani Chilume Stadium, Francistown, Botswana | São Tomé and Príncipe | 3–0 | 3–0 | 2026 FIFA World Cup qualification |

== Honours ==
Mamelodi Sundowns

- South African Premiership: 2020–21, 2021–22, 2022–23, 2023–24, 2024–25
- Nedbank Cup: 2021–22
- MTN 8: 2021
- African Football League: 2023
- CAF Champions League: 2025–26

Namibia

- COSAFA Cup: 2015

Individual

- PSL Footballer of the Year: 2020–21
- Lesley Manyathela Golden Boot: 2019–20, 2021–22, 2022–23
- PSL Player of the Season: 2020–21, 2021–22
- PSL Players' Player of the Season: 2020–21, 2021–22
- CAF Champions League top scorer: 2022–23

Records

- PSL all-time top scorer: 130 goals
