= Watersmeet, KwaZulu-Natal =

Watersmeet
- Location within KwaZulu-Natal Location within South Africa
- Coordinates: 28.399°S 29.733°E
- Country: South Africa
- Province: KwaZulu-Natal
- District: uThukela
- Municipality: Alfred Duma

Area
  - Total: 32.35 km^{2} (12.49 sq mi)

Population (2011)
  - Total: 14,461
  - Density: 447.0/km^{2} (1,158/sq mi)

Racial makeup (2011)
  - Black African: 99.8%
  - Coloured: 0.1%
  - Indian/Asian: 0.1%

First languages (2011)
  - Zulu: 95.7%
  - S. Ndebele: 1.3%
  - Other: 3.1%
- Time zone: UTC+2 (SAST)
- PO box: 3388

Watersmeet is a village in the Uthukela District Municipality in the KwaZulu-Natal province of South Africa.
