= Musa Nyatama =

South African soccer player

Personal information
- Full name: Musa Bloffi Nyatama
- Date of birth: 15 August 1987 (age 39)
- Place of birth: Benoni, Gauteng, South Africa
- Height: 1.80 m (5 ft 11 in)

Team information
- Current team: Swallows (manager)

Youth career
- Daveyton Liverpool
- –2008: Bidvest Wits

Senior career*
Years	Team	Apps	(Gls)
2008–2009	Thanda Royal Zulu		
2009–2010	Maritzburg United	22	(3)
2010–2015	Mamelodi Sundowns	14	(1)
2010–2011	→ Maritzburg United (loan)	23	(1)
2013–2015	→ Bloemfontein Celtic (loan)	53	(4)
2015–2017	Bloemfontein Celtic	57	(7)
2017–2020	Orlando Pirates	56	(6)
2020	Highlands Park	8	(0)
2020–	Swallows	3	(0)

Managerial career
- 2022: Swallows
- 2023: Swallows
- 2024–: Swallows
- * Club domestic league appearances and goals as of 19:54, 2 January 2021 (UTC)

Musa Nyatama (born 15 August 1987) is a South African football (soccer) midfielder and manager who manages Premier Soccer League club Swallows.

== Personal life ==
Nyatama was born in Daveyton in Gauteng.
