= Chibuike Ohizu =

Nigerian footballer (born 1996)

Personal information
- Date of birth: 18 September 1996 (age 30)
- Place of birth: Onitsha, Nigeria
- Position: Forward

Team information
- Current team: Siwelele (on loan from Sekhukhune United)
- Number: 20

Senior career*
Years	Team	Apps	(Gls)
- Inter FC Enugu
2016–2018	Leruma United		
2018–2021	Jomo Cosmos	37	(3)
2020–2021	→ Sekhukhune United (loan)	9	(2)
2021–	Sekhukhune United	92	(27)
2025–	→ Siwelele (loan)	2	(0)
- * Club domestic league appearances and goals as of 27 September 2025

Chibuike Ohizu (born 18 September 1996) is a Nigerian professional footballer who plays as a forward for South African Premier Division club Siwelele, on loan from Sekhukhune United.

== Career ==
Born in Onitsha, Ohizu played for Nigeria National League club Inter FC Enugu before moving to Kempton Park, South Africa and was recruited to the Future of Africa Academy by Abayomi Adebayo in 2015. In 2016, he signed for Gauteng-based SAFA Second Division side Leruma United. He joined Jomo Cosmos in 2018 after playing in a friendly match against them. Ohizu joined Sekhukhune United on loan during the 2020–21 season and joined the club permanently after they won the National First Division and were promoted to the South African Premier Division at the end of the season.

In September 2025, Ohizu joined fellow Premier Division side Siwelele on a season-long loan, with the option to make the deal permanent at the end of the season.

== Honours ==
Sekhukhune United

- National First Division: 2020–21
