= Bienvenu Eva Nga =

Cameroonian footballer

Personal information
- Date of birth: 17 February 1993 (age 33)
- Height: 1.90 m (6 ft 3 in)
- Position: Forward

Team information
- Current team: Chippa United
- Number: 7

Senior career*
| Years | Team | Apps | (Gls) |
| 2013–2014 | Black Stars | | |
| 2014–2015 | AS Stade Mandji | | |
| 2015–2016 | GD Maputo | | |
| 2016–2017 | ENH de Vilankulo | | |
| 2017 | FC Chibuto | | |
| 2017–2018 | Leixões | 2 | (0) |
| 2018–2019 | Amora | 17 | (3) |
| 2019 | Costa Do Sol | | (24) |
| 2020 | Bidvest Wits | 14 | (2) |
| 2020–2022 | Chippa United | 52 | (15) |
| 2022–2024 | Orlando Pirates | 11 | (1) |
| 2024– | Chippa United | 44 | (6) |
- * Club domestic league appearances and goals as of 4 January 2026

Bienvenu Eva Nga (born 17 February 1993) is a Cameroonian professional footballer who plays as a forward for Chippa United in the South African Premier Division.

== Career ==
He started his career in Cameroon with semi-professional side Black Stars. After playing for Gabonese side AS Stade Mandji and GD Maputo, ENH de Vilankulo and FC Chibuto in Mozambique, he signed for Liga Portugal 2 side Leixões in 2018. He made 2 league appearances for Leixões. Eva Nga subsequently joined Amora, for who he made 17 appearances, scoring three goals, before joining Moçambola club Costa Do Sol in January 2019, for whom he won the 2019 Moçambola title.

He signed for South African Premier Division side Bidvest Wits in January 2020. He made 14 league appearances for Wits and scored two goals. The club were sold to Tshakhuma Tsha Madzivhandila at the end of the season, and Eva Nga subsequently joined Chippa United. On 3 November 2020, He scored his first goals for Chippa United with a hat-trick in a 3–1 victory over Maritzburg United.

Following an unsuccessful stint at Orlando Pirates, he moved back to Chippa United during the 2024 winter transfer window..
