= Kameelrivier =

Kameelrivier Gamowre Kamela
- Location within Mpumalanga Location within South Africa
- Coordinates: 25°07′38″S 28°59′48″E
- Country: South Africa
- Province: Mpumalanga
- District: Nkangala
- Municipality: Dr JS Moroka

Government
  - Councillor: Josiah Mphuthi (ANC)

Area
  - Total: 6.30 km^{2} (2.43 sq mi)

Population (2001)
  - Total: 11,856
  - Density: 1,880/km^{2} (4,870/sq mi)
- Time zone: UTC+2 (SAST)
- Postal code (street): 0477

Kameel-rivier B or Kameelrivier is a village in the low-veld region of KwaNdebele, in the Nkangala District Municipality of the Mpumalanga province of South Africa. The majority of the residents are from the Ndebele people and Sepedi-speaking people. Siyabuswa is its main town. Main family clans include Napo, Masilela, Ramushu, Mahlangu and Skhosana clans.

== History ==
The Mzimdala were the first settlers in Kameelrivier.

The village was instrumental in the struggle for the liberation of South Africa by being a place of hiding for political activists during apartheid. During 1994, the village held its first free election which led to it being held by the ANC rule.

The village was run by the eKhosi Kingdom before it was removed by government as the main Ndebele royal house, later overseen by the Kwamhlanga kingdom.

== Education and culture ==
Kameelrivier has two primary schools, Sizani Primary School and Sakhe Primary School, and three secondary schools, Tholulwazi Senior Secondary School, Hlanganani Senior School and Fundukhuphuke Middle School. Morwe Middle school has its name derived from the native name for the village.

Kameelrivier Stadium is located at Kameelrivier B in Mzimdala.
