= Mthatha Bucks F.C. =

Mthatha Bucks
- Full name: Mthatha Bucks Football Club
- Ground: Mthatha Stadium
- Capacity: 6,200

Mthatha Bucks F.C. are a football club based in Mthatha, Eastern Cape, South Africa.

== History ==
They were promoted to the National First Division in July 2015, having finished as runner-up in the 2014-15 SAFA Second Division.

Mthatha Bucks F.C. were founded following the sale of Happy Brothers F.C.'s franchise license.
