= Marumo Gallants F.C. =

- Full name: Marumo Gallants Football Club
- Nickname: Bahlabane Ba Ntwa
- Founded: 2021; 5 years ago
- Ground: Royal Bafokeng Stadium
- Capacity: 46,000
- Chairman: Abram Sello
- Manager: Phuti Mohafe
- League: Premiership
- 2025–26: 14th of 16
- Website: www.marumogallantsfc.co.za
| colours | colours | colours |

Marumo Gallants is a South African soccer club based in the North West. Previously they played in Bloemfontein, Free State, relocating after purchasing the status from Moroka Swallows. Prior to the start of the 2026–27 South African Premiership, the club relocated to the North West, playing in the Premiership.

They played in the Premiership for two seasons after purchasing a Premiership license from Tshakuma Tsha Madzivhandila prior to the start of the 2021–22 season.

== 2021-2022 season ==
Marumo Gallants finished in 10th place in the Premiership in the 2021–22 season and reached the final of the Nedbank Cup, securing qualification for the 2022–23 CAF Confederation Cup. They took part in the 2021–22 CAF Confederation Cup.

=== Premiership ===
Marumo Gallants finished 10th in the Premiership, with 34 points from their 30 games.

Gallants finished eight points clear of the relegation play-off place and 13 points below the 2022–23 CAF Confederation Cup qualification places, but qualified for the Confederation Cup after reaching the Nedbank Cup final.

Gallants only managed three home wins all season, drawing 10 and losing two. Seven of their home games resulted in 0–0 draws.

They won four of their 15 away games, drawing three and losing eight. Their away results included a 1–1 draw at 2021–22 South African Premiership champions Mamelodi Sundowns.

Ndabayithethwa Ndlondlo was Gallants' top scorer in the Premiership with seven goals.

=== Nedbank Cup ===
Marumo Gallants reached the Nedbank Cup final, to qualify for the 2022–23 CAF Confederation Cup.

Gallants won 2–0 against Santos in the Nedbank Cup round of 32, with two goals from Sede Junior Dion.

Gallants drew 1–1 with Orlando Pirates in the last 16, securing their place in the quarter-finals with a 5–4 penalty shoot out win. Ndabayithethwa Ndlondlo gave Gallants a first half lead from the penalty spot, but Bandile Shandu equalised in the second half. In the penalty shootout, both sides missed one of their first five penalties. Terrence Dzvukamanja missed Pirates' sixth penalty and Gallants goalkeeper King Ndlovu converted to see Gallants through.

A Dion goal secured a 1–0 win against Baroka in the last eight and Gallants beat Tshakhuma Tsha Madzivhandila 1–0 in the semi-finals, with an own goal separating the two sides.

In the final, played at Royal Bafokeng Stadium in Phokeng, Gallants took on league champions Mamelodi Sundowns.

A goal from Peter Shalulile gave Sundowns a first half lead, but Gallants forced extra-time with a late equaliser from Dion.

Gallants were reduced to 10 men when Ndabayithethwa Ndlondlo was shown a red card in the second half of extra-time, before a goal from Thapelo Morena secured victory for Sundowns, who completed a league and cup treble.

=== CAF Confederation Cup ===
After Tshakhuma Tsha Madzivhandila had won the 2020–21 Nedbank Cup, Marumo Gallants' inaugural season saw them compete in the 2021–22 CAF Confederation Cup, having bought a Premiership licence from TTM.

Gallants won their two legged first round tie against Futuro Kings 4–2 on aggregate. They lost the first leg 2–1, with Ndabayithethwa Ndlondlo scoring for Gallants, but won the second leg 3–0, with two goals from Celimpilo Ngema and one from Thabo Mnyamane.

In the second round, Gallants overcame AS Vita Club 3–2 over two legs. They won the first leg 2–1, with Ngema scoring both goals. Gallants trailed 1–0 in the second leg, before Sibusiso Nkosi's late equaliser secured Gallants an aggregate victory.

Gallants lost 1–0 on aggregate against TP Mazembe in the play-off round. TP Mazembe won the first leg 1–0 in Burundi and held Gallants to a 0–0 draw in South Africa to qualify for the CAF Confederation Cup group stage.

== 2022-2023 season ==
Gallants struggled in the Premiership during the first half of the 2022–23 season. At the end of January 2023, Gallants were at the bottom of the table, following a run of eight games without a win, and had won just two Premiership games all season.

The appointment of Dylan Kerr as acting head coach saw an immediate change of fortunes, as Gallants went on an eight-game unbeaten run in the Premiership following Kerr's arrival, climbed out of the relegation zone and reached the CAF Confederation Cup semi-finals.

Gallants went into their final game of the season against Kerr's former team Moroka Swallows knowing a win would be enough to keep their place in the Premiership, but a 2–0 defeat against Swallows and a 0–0 draw for relegation rivals Chippa United against Golden Arrows meant that Gallants finished bottom of the table and were relegated to the National First Division.

In May 2023, Kerr left Gallants.

=== Early season struggles ===
Gallants failed to win any of their first eight Premiership games, drawing six and losing two.

They registered their first Premiership win of the season on October 4, with a Sede Junior Don goal securing a 1–0 victory at TS Galaxy. Their second Premiership win of the season, on October 29, was a 2–1 victory against Cape Town City. Ranga Chivaviro scored both Gallants goals, including a stoppage time winner after Cape Town City had scored late on to level the scores.

Gallants' next eight Premiership games saw them pick up just two points, to leave them at the bottom of the Premiership table.

Despite managing only two Premiership wins up to the end of January, Gallants qualified for the group stage of the 2022–23 CAF Confederation Cup. They beat Madagascar's ASSM Elgeco Plus 4–1 over two legs in the second round and Libyan side Al Ahli 3–1 on aggregate in the play-off round, after losing the first leg 1–0.

=== Appointment of Dylan Kerr ===
At the end of January 2023, with Gallants at the bottom of the Premiership table, head coach Dan Malesela was given what the club described as 'special leave' and experienced Premiership head coach Dylan Kerr was named as technical consultant.

Kerr revealed that he is acting as head coach while waiting for his work permit to be approved. Raymond Mdaka and Sly Mosala were also appointed as part of the new Gallants coaching team.

Gallants had won just two Premiership games all season and were on a run of eight games without a win when Kerr was appointed as acting head coach. Kerr's appointment prompted an immediate upturn in Gallants' fortunes, and they won their first four games after his arrival and went on an eight-game unbeaten run in the Premiership.

A 2–0 victory against Premiership rivals Sekhukhune United in Kerr's first game was followed by a 3–1 win in the Nedbank Cup against Magesi.

Gallants went on to win their first two group games in the CAF Confederation Cup, a 4–1 victory against Al Akhdar and a 2–1 win against Saint Eloi Lupopo.

=== CAF Confederation Cup success ===
Under Kerr's guidance, Gallants progressed to the CAF Confederation Cup semi-finals.

They qualified for the quarter-finals, as South Africa's sole representatives in the competition, with one group game to spare. In their final group game, they came from 2–0 down to beat Saint Eloi Lupopo 3–2 to finish top of their group. Gallants were drawn against 2021–22 Egyptian Premier League runners-up Pyramids in the last eight.

In the first leg of their quarter-final, Gallants drew 1–1 against Pyramids in Cairo. Ranga Chivaviro gave Gallants a 1–0 lead early in the second half, but Pyramids drew level with a stoppage time penalty. In the return leg in South Africa, Gallants won 1–0 thanks to a first half goal from Celimpilo Ngema, to secure their semi-final place.

Gallants won all six of their 2022–23 CAF Confederation Cup home games in the run up to the semi-finals, including a maximum three home wins in their group, and kept four clean sheets. They scored 14 goals and conceded just three in their six home games prior to the semi-finals.

Gallants took on 2021–22 Tanzanian Premier League champions Young Africans in the two legged semi-finals. In the first leg at the National Stadium in Dar es Salaam, Tanzania, Young Africans won 2–0 with two second half goals - with the second goal scored in stoppage time.

Gallants players refused to train the day before the semi-final second leg, in protest at what they felt were derisory bonuses offered by chairman Abram Sello for reaching the final.

In the return leg in South Africa, Young Africans won 2–1 to secure a 4–1 aggregate victory. Young Africans took a 2–0 lead before Chivaviro scored in stoppage time for Gallants.

With a goal apiece in the semi-final second leg, Chivaviro and Young Africans' Fiston Kalala Mayele were tied as the Confederation Cup's top goalscorers, with six goals each.

Marumo Gallants chairman Abram Sello says the club had to find up to 18 million South African Rand (0.85 million Euros) to finance the team's participation in the CAF Confederation Cup.

=== Detention of club officials in Libya ===
Two Marumo Gallants officials were detained in Libya following the team's CAF Confederation Cup game against Al Akhdar on March 19, as a result of unpaid hotel bills.

Club physio Tebogo Amos Dhlomo and media manager Rufus Matsena were held after Gallants failed to pay their hotel bill and other expenses incurred. They were not allowed to leave the hotel while the club still owed money, according to Reuters. It was reported that Gallants owed the hotel $39,000.

Gallants chairman Abram Sello claimed that the club had faced difficulties transferring the funds into the country, as there were no functioning electronic payments systems and everything had to be settled in cash.

After intervention from the Department of International Relations and Cooperation, the matter was resolved and the two South Africans returned home.

The trip to Libya was described as a “nightmare” by Gallants acting head coach Dylan Kerr and included the team being delayed for three days in transit in Istanbul while waiting for onward flight tickets to Libya.

=== Unbeaten Premiership run ===
Gallants were on a run of eight Premiership games without a win when Kerr was appointed as acting head coach. Following Kerr's appointment, Gallants were unbeaten in their next eight Premiership games.

A 1–1 draw against Kaizer Chiefs took Gallants off the bottom of the table and a Ranga Chivaviro hat-trick secured a 3–1 win against Chippa United to take Gallants out of the Premiership relegation zone.

A 0–0 draw against high-flying SuperSport United - who moved up to second place as a result - continued the unbeaten run, and goals from Chivaviro and Mpho Mvelase, with a stoppage time equaliser, earned a 2–2 draw at bottom team Maritzburg United and extended Gallants' unbeaten Premiership run to eight games. The unbeaten run came to an end with a 2–0 defeat against 2022–23 South African Premiership champions Mamelodi Sundowns.

=== Relegation to the National First Division ===
Gallants were relegated to the National First Division on the final day of the Premiership season.

Going into the final game of the season away to Kerr's former club Moroka Swallows, Gallants were in the relegation play-off spot, one point behind Maritzburg United, who had completed their Premiership fixtures, and level on points with bottom team Chippa United with a superior goal difference.

Given Gallants' plus 10 goal difference advantage over Chippa United going into their final game, a win against Swallows would have guaranteed Gallants would stay in the Premiership. A draw against Swallows would have ensured that Gallants avoided the automatic relegation place, but could have seen them finish the Premiership season in the relegation play-off place. Gallants would have avoided the automatic relegation spot with a defeat if Chippa United had lost their last game of the season against Golden Arrows.

Swallows took the lead in first half stoppage time and doubled their lead late in the second half to secure a 2–0 win, with Chippa United's 0–0 draw against Golden Arrows leaving Gallants at the bottom of the table and confirming their relegation to the National First Division.

Kerr had previously had a 100% record of taking over at four relegation-threatened Premiership clubs and keeping them all up. This was the first time he had been unable achieve the feat.

Reacting to the team's relegation on the "1871" podcast, Kerr says the players had let themselves and the club down for refusing to train in the run up to the final game over a dispute about bonuses. He added that the dispute was a contributing factor in the side's relegation.

Ranga Chivaviro was Gallants' top scorer in the Premiership with 11 goals.

Following the team's relegation, it was announced that Kerr would be leaving Gallants.

== Return to the Premiership ==
Dylan Kerr was reappointed as manager on 9 July 2024 after the club purchased the Premiership status from Kerr's former club, Moroka Swallows.

Alexandre Lafitte was appointed in June 2025. Lafitte led Gallants to the final of the 2025 Carling Knockout Cup, where Gallants were defeated 1-0 by Orlando Pirates, before being suspended in March 2025 after a seven game winless streak.

== Notable achievements ==
- 2021–22 Nedbank Cup finalists
- 2022–23 CAF Confederation Cup semi-finalists
- 2025 Carling Knockout Cup finalists

== League record ==
=== Premiership ===
- 2021–22 – 10th
- 2022–23 – 16th (relegated)

=== National First Division ===
- 2023–24 – 11th (purchased Premiership status)

=== Premiership ===
- 2024–25 – 10th
- 2025–26 – 14th
