= TS Galaxy F.C. =

South African Football club

TS Galaxy
- Full name: Tim Sukazi Galaxy
- Nickname: The Rockets
- Short name: TSG
- Founded: 2015; 11 years ago
- Ground: Mbombela Stadium
- Capacity: 43,500
- Coordinates: 25°27′40″S 30°55′44″E
- Owner: Tim Sukazi
- Coach: Bernard Parker
- League: South African Premiership
- 2025–26: 12th
- Website: www.tsgalaxyfc.com
Home colours	Away colours

TS Galaxy F.C. is a South African football club based in Kameelrivier (Nkangala District Municipality) near Siyabuswa (Mpumalanga) that plays in the Premiership.

The club is named after its owner, Tim Sukazi.

== History ==
The Rockets, as TS Galaxy is known, was formed in 2015. The club campaigned in the SAFA Second Division for three seasons before purchasing the National First Division status of Cape Town All Stars in 2018

On Saturday 18 May 2019, TS Galaxy won its first trophy, the Nedbank Cup, after beating Kaizer Chiefs 1-0 through a Zakhele Lepasa penalty scored in the second minute of second-half injury time. By doing so, the club became the first team in South African football to win the Nedbank Cup while campaigning in National First Division.

Stars competed in the 2019–20 CAF Confederation Cup, where they were eliminated by Enyimba of Nigeria in the play-off round.

In September 2020, the club purchased the Premiership status of Highlands Park, and appeared in the 2020–21 South African Premiership season, finishing ninth.

In June 2024, after finishing a record sixth in the 2023–24 Premiership, the club was handed a three window ban on registering new players by FIFA for unpaid fees to their ex-striker, Bernard Yao Kouassi.

Adnan Beganovic took over as coach in November 2024. In April 2026, a few days before Galaxy faced Durban City in the 2025–26 Nedbank Cup final, Beganovic was dismissed. Galaxy had gone 11 league games without victory.

== African competitions ==
TS Galaxy played in the 2019–20 CAF Confederation Cup after winning the Nedbank Cup the previous season.

They defeated Saint Louis Suns United and CNaPS Sport before being defeated by Nigeria's Enyimba in the play-off round.

== Honours ==
- Nedbank Cup
  - Winners (1): 2018–19

== Current squad ==
As of 17 September, 2025

Note: Flags indicate national team as defined under FIFA eligibility rules; some limited exceptions apply. Players may hold more than one non-FIFA nationality.

No.	Pos.	Nation	Player
1	GK	RSA	Sipho Gift Maseti
2	DF	RSA	Mpho Mvelase
3	DF	RSA	Kganyane Letsoenyo
4	DF	RSA	McBeth Mahlangu
5	DF	BRA	Igor Salatiel
6	MF	RSA	Jeffrey Dlamini
7	DF	RSA	Qobolwakhe Sibande
8	MF	RSA	Mlungisi Mbunjana
9	FW	ZIM	Junior Zindoga
10	MF	RSA	Sphesihle Maduna
11	FW	RSA	Onke Moletshe
12	MF	RSA	Nhlanhla Mgaga
15	MF	RSA	Puso Dithejane
16	GK	CIV	Ira Tapé
17	FW	RSA	Victor Letsoalo

No.	Pos.	Nation	Player
18	FW	CIV	Mory Keita
21	FW	BRA	Paulinho
22	DF	RSA	Lentswe Motaung
23	DF	RSA	Patrick Fisher
25	DF	RSA	Khulumani Ndamane
26	MF	RSA	Ntandoyenkosi Nkosi
27	FW	RSA	Seluleko Mahlambi
28	MF	RSA	Khayelihle Mncube
33	DF	RSA	Thiago Walters
38	GK	RSA	Nkosingabele Madela
39	FW	RSA	Mpumelelo Ndaba
45	DF	RSA	Veluyeke Zulu
—	DF	NED	Ezra van der Heiden
—	FW	RSA	Sedwyn George
—	FW	RSA	Siyabonga Nguessan

=== Out on loan ===
The following players have previously made a league or cup appearance for TS Galaxy and are currently on loan at other teams:
Note: Flags indicate national team as defined under FIFA eligibility rules; some limited exceptions apply. Players may hold more than one non-FIFA nationality.

No.	Pos.	Nation	Player

== League record ==
=== SAFA Second Division ===
- 2015–16 – 7th
- 2016–17 – 2nd
- 2017–18 – 5th (purchased their NFD status)

=== National First Division ===
- 2018–19 – 8th
- 2019–20 – 10th (purchased their Premiership status)

=== Premiership ===
- 2020–21 – 9th
- 2021–22 – 13th
- 2022–23 – 10th
- 2023–24 – 6th
- 2024–25 – 5th
- 2025–26 – 12th

== See also ==
- TS Galaxy Queens
