= Sekhukhune United F.C. =

South African soccer club

Sekhukhune United
- Full name: Sekhukhune United Football Club
- Nicknames: Babina Noko, Dinoko
- Founded: 2019
- Ground: Peter Mokaba Stadium
- Capacity: 43,000
- Owner: Simon Malatji
- Chairman: Simon Malatji
- Manager: Cedric Kaze
- League: Premiership
- 2025–26: 5th
- Website: https://sekhukhuneunitedfc.co.za
| Home colours | Away colours |

Sekhukhune United F.C. is a South African soccer club from Burgersfort, Sekhukhune District, Limpopo, that plays in the South African Premiership. Formed when the owner of African All Stars, playing in the SAFA Second Division, purchased the National First Division licence from Tshakhuma Tsha Madzivhandila and moved the club to Limpopo. In its inaugural season, it won the 2020–21 National First Division, earning promotion to the 2021–22 South African Premiership. Although the club is from Burgersfort, it plays its home matches at Peter Mokaba Stadium in Polokwane.

The club finished 11th in its first season in the top tier, 7th in its second season, and reached the final of the 2022–23 Nedbank Cup.

Sekhukhune United F.C. reached the quarter-finals of the Nedbank Cup in the 2025/26 season, where they were eliminated by Milford F.C. on penalties following a 2-2 draw after extra time.

== Players ==
As of 1 September 2025

Note: Flags indicate national team as defined under FIFA eligibility rules; some limited exceptions apply. Players may hold more than one non-FIFA nationality.

| No. | Pos. | Nation | Player |
|---|---|---|---|
| 1 | GK | ZAM | Toaster Nsabata |
| 2 | DF | RSA | Tshepho Mashiloane (on loan from Orlando Pirates) |
| 3 | DF | RSA | Bright Ndlovu |
| 4 | DF | RSA | Daniel Cardoso |
| 6 | MF | RSA | Miguel Timm |
| 7 | FW | RSA | Keletso Makgalwa |
| 8 | MF | RSA | Thabang Monare |
| 10 | FW | RSA | Vusimuzi Mncube |
| 11 | DF | RSA | Mpho Rammala |
| 12 | DF | RSA | Shaune Mogaila |
| 14 | DF | RSA | Sikhosonke Langa |
| 15 | MF | RSA | Siphesihle Mkhize |
| 16 | GK | RSA | Renaldo Leaner |
| 17 | FW | RSA | Bradley Grobler |
| 18 | FW | RSA | Sphiwe Mahlangu |

| No. | Pos. | Nation | Player |
|---|---|---|---|
| 19 | DF | RSA | Medupi Thokolo |
| 20 | MF | RSA | Malekgene Mampuru |
| 22 | FW | RSA | Olerato Mandi |
| 23 | MF | RSA | Linda Mntambo |
| 24 | MF | RSA | Sydney Malivha |
| 25 | DF | RSA | Vuyo Letlapa |
| 26 | DF | RSA | Katlego Mohamme |
| 27 | MF | RSA | Ronaldo Maarman |
| 28 | DF | RSA | Tsepo Matsimbi |
| 29 | DF | COD | Trésor Tshibwabwa |
| 30 | GK | GEQ | Manuel Sapunga |
| 31 | MF | RSA | Tshepo Mokoane |
| 38 | FW | RSA | Samkele Sihlali |
| 40 | GK | RSA | Kgoleng Ratisani |
| 45 | MF | RSA | Karabo Tlaka |

=== Out on loan ===
Note: Flags indicate national team as defined under FIFA eligibility rules; some limited exceptions apply. Players may hold more than one non-FIFA nationality.

| No. | Pos. | Nation | Player |
|---|---|---|---|
| 9 | FW | COD | Andy Boyeli (at Young Africans until 30 June 2026) |
| 34 | FW | NGR | Chibuike Ohizu (at Siwelele until 30 June 2026) |

| No. | Pos. | Nation | Player |
|---|---|---|---|
| — | MF | RSA | Banele Gama (at Magesi until 30 June 2026) |

== League record ==
=== National First Division ===
- 2020–21 – 1st (promoted)

=== South African Premiership ===
- 2021–22 – 11th
- 2022–23 – 7th
- 2023–24 – 4th
- 2024–25 – 4th
- 2025–26 – 5th

== Achievements ==
National First Division

- Champions (1): 2020–21

Nedbank Cup

- Finalists (1): 2022–23

== Coaches ==
- Lehlohonolo Seema (2023 - 2025)
- Eric Tinkler (2025 - 2026)
- Cedric Kaze (2026-)
