= All Stars F.C. (South Africa) =

South African football club based in Brakpan

- Full name: All Stars Football Club
- Founded: 2010; 16 years ago
- Owner: Lunga Ncwana
- League: National First Division
- 2021–22: National First Division, 3rd
Home colours

All Stars is a South African football club based in Johannesburg.

The club was founded as Cape Town All Stars in 2010, and played their home games at the Athlone Stadium. They dissolved after selling their National First Division league status to then third tier TS Galaxy in 2018. In 2020 they bought back their status from TS Galaxy, who in turn bought their way into the Premiership by purchasing the status from Highlands Park.

== Relocation and renaming ==
The club relocated from Cape Town to Johannesburg at the start of the 2022–23 season, and was renamed All Stars F.C.

== Sale ==
Following the end of the 2022–23 season, All Stars, who finished fourth, sold their National First Division licence to Black Leopards, who finished bottom and was due to be relegated.

== Seasons ==
| Season | League | Position | Played | Won | Lost | Drew | Goals for | Goals against | Points |
|---|---|---|---|---|---|---|---|---|---|
| 2010–11 | SAFA Second Division | | | | | | | | |
| 2011–12 | SAFA Second Division | | | | | | | | |
| 2012–13 | SAFA Second Division | | | | | | | | |
| 2013–14 | SAFA Second Division | | | | | | | | |
| 2014–15 | National First Division | 5th | 30 | 12 | 11 | 7 | 42 | 36 | 47 |
| 2015–16 | National First Division | 7th | 30 | 13 | 6 | 11 | 30 | 32 | 45 |
| 2016–17 | National First Division | 9th | 30 | 9 | 11 | 10 | 27 | 29 | 38 |
| 2017–18 | National First Division | 7th | 30 | 9 | 13 | 8 | 29 | 26 | 40 |
| 2020–21 | National First Division | 10th | 30 | 9 | 10 | 11 | 28 | 32 | 37 |
| 2021–22 | National First Division | 3rd | 30 | 12 | 12 | 6 | 37 | 26 | 48 |
| 2022–23 | National First Division | 4th | 30 | 12 | | | | | 48 |
