= Tshakhuma Tsha Madzivhandila F.C. =

Tshakhuma Tsha Madzivhandila
- Full name: Tshakhuma Tsha Madzivhandila Football Club
- Nickname: Vhadau vhadamani
- Short name: TTM
- League: SAFA Second Division (Limpopo)
- 2025–26: 11th (Limpopo Stream A)
- Website: ttm-fc.co.za

Tshakhuma Tsha Madzivhandila Football Club (often known as TTM F.C.) is a South African soccer club based in the town of Thohoyandou in the Limpopo province.

Prior to the start of the 2025–26 SAFA Second Division season, the club purchased the SAFA Second Division status from Maruleng Celtic.

== History ==
Previously playing in the ABC Motsepe League, the club purchased the National First Division (NFD) status of Milano United F.C. in July 2017.

Under owner Lawrence Mulaudzi, the club continued to spend its way to the top when in 2020 it purchased the Premiership status of Bidvest Wits, and played in the 2020–21 South African Premiership. Seven months after the purchase, with the club in financial difficulties, last in the league, and with players striking after salaries were unpaid, the club sold their franchise to a pharmaceuticals consortium., which formed Marumo Gallants, and purchased a National First Division from Royal AM. TTM were relegated at the end of the 2022–23 National First Division season, and did not return in the following year's SAFA Second Division, selling the licence to Maruleng Celtic.

They purchased the licence back from Celtic in 2025.

== Fraud accusations ==
In December 2020, CEO Sello Chokoe was accused of fraud and of stealing over R2 million from the club, and was suspended pending a hearing. Sello continued to receive a full salary, and repeatedly avoided a hearing by submitting a sick note on the days before. In August 2021, Zimbabwean goalkeeper Edmore Sibanda, after an injury forced him to retire, was not paid R600 000 the club owed him. He approached FIFA, and the club was banned. In January 2023 the club agreed to settle. In July 2022 the club signed Cheslyn Jampies as their captain and failed to pay him and other players' salaries. Jampies approached the Dispute Resolution Council of the National Soccer League (NSL) and was awarded damage claims totaling R750 000.

== Honours ==
=== Domestic cup ===
- Nedbank Cup
  - Winners (1): 2020–21

== League record ==
=== SAFA Second Division (Limpopo Stream) ===
- 2016–17 – 3rd

=== National First Division ===
- 2017–18 – 6th
- 2018–19 – 3rd
- 2019–20 – 3rd (purchased Premiership status)

=== Premiership ===
- 2020–21 – 12th (sold Premiership status)

=== National First Division ===
- 2021–22 – 13th
- 2022–23 – 15th (relegated)

=== SAFA Second Division (Limpopo Stream) ===
- 2025–26 – 11th (Stream A)
