= 2020–21 Kaizer Chiefs F.C. season =

Kaizer Chiefs
2020–21 season
- Chairman: Kaizer Motaung
- Manager: Stuart Baxter
- Stadium: FNB Stadium
- Dstv Premiership: 8th
- MTN 8: Semi-finals
- Nedbank Cup: Round of 32
- Champions League: Runners–up
- Top goalscorer: League: Manyama (8); All: Castro (10)
Home colours	Away colours

The 2020–21 season was Kaizer Chiefs' 25th season in the South African Premier Division, the highest division of South African football league system. After finishing in second place in the 2019–20 season, Kaizer Chiefs entered the 2020–21 CAF Champions League.

== Squad ==
=== Season squad ===
Squad No.	Name	Nationality	Position(s)	Date of birth (Age)
Goalkeepers
1	Brylon Petersen	(South Africa)	GK	18 December 1995 (age 30)
32	Itumeleng Khune (C)	(South Africa)	GK	20 June 1987 (age 39)
34	Karabo Molefe	(South Africa)	GK	6 January 2003 (age 23)
40	Daniel Akpeyi	(Nigeria)	GK	3 August 1986 (age 40)
44	Bruce Bvuma	(South Africa)	GK	15 May 1995 (age 31)
Defenders
2	Ramahlwe Mphahlele	(South Africa)	RB / CB	1 February 1990 (age 36)
3	Eric Mathoho	(South Africa)	CB	1 March 1990 (age 36)
4	Daniel Cardoso	(South Africa)	CB	16 February 1989 (age 37)
18	Kgotso Moleko	(South Africa)	RB / RWB	27 August 1989 (age 37)
19	Happy Mashiane	(South Africa)	LB / LWB	1 January 1998 (age 28)
20	Yagan Sasman	(South Africa)	LB / CB	6 July 1996 (age 30)
22	Philani Zulu	(South Africa)	LB / LWB / LM	16 September 1992 (age 34)
30	Siyabonga Ngezana	(South Africa)	CB	15 November 1997 (age 28)
36	Siphosakhe Ntiya-Ntiya	(South Africa)	LB / LWB	6 October 1996 (age 30)
39	Reeve Frosler	(South Africa)	RB / RWB / RM	11 January 1998 (age 28)
45	Njabulo Blom	(South Africa)	RB / CB / CM	11 December 1999 (age 26)
Midfielders
5	Teddy Akumu	(Kenya)	DM / CM	20 October 1992 (age 34)
6	Kearyn Baccus	(South Africa)	CM / RM	5 September 1991 (age 35)
10	Siphelele Ntshangase	(South Africa)	CM / AM	11 May 1993 (age 33)
21	Lebogang Manyama	(South Africa)	RM / AM	13 September 1990 (age 36)
31	Willard Katsande	(Zimbabwe)	DM / CM	15 January 1986 (age 40)
37	Nkosingiphile Ngcobo	(South Africa)	CM / AM	16 November 1999 (age 26)
46	Keletso Sifama	(South Africa)	AM	27 April 2003 (age 23)
47	Lebohang Lesako	(South Africa)	RM	3 July 1999 (age 27)
Forwards
7	Lazarous Kambole	(Zambia)	RW / LW / SS	20 January 1994 (age 32)
8	Leonardo Castro	(Colombia)	ST	12 May 1989 (age 37)
9	Samir Nurković	(Serbia)	ST	13 June 1992 (age 34)
11	Khama Billiat	(Zimbabwe)	RW / LW / SS	16 July 1989 (age 37)
25	Bernard Parker	(South Africa)	ST / SS	16 March 1986 (age 40)
28	Dumisani Zuma	(South Africa)	RW / SS	22 May 1995 (age 31)

Last updated: 19 October 2020.
Source: worldfootball.net

== Competitions ==
=== South African Premier Division ===
==== League table ====
Pos	Team	Pld	W	D	L	GF	GA	GD	Pts
6	Swallows	30	8	20	2	31	23	+8	44
7	Cape Town City	30	10	11	9	42	40	+2	41
8	Kaizer Chiefs	30	8	12	10	34	37	−3	36
9	TS Galaxy	30	9	9	12	26	31	−5	36
10	Baroka	30	7	13	10	28	36	−8	34

Updated to match(es) played on 5 June 2021. Source: Premier Soccer League

=== Results summary ===
Overall								Home						Away					
Pld	W	D	L	GF	GA	GD	Pts	W	D	L	GF	GA	GD	W	D	L	GF	GA	GD
30	8	12	10	34	37	−3	36	3	7	5	17	20	−3	5	5	5	17	17	0

Last updated: 5 June 2021.
Source: Competitive matches

=== Matches ===
24 October 2020 1	Kaizer Chiefs	0–3	Mamelodi Sundowns	Soweto
		Report	Shalulile 37'; Erasmus 54'; Zwane 89' (pen.)	Stadium: FNB Stadium; Referee: Luxolo Badi

27 October 2020 2	Chippa United	0–1	Kaizer Chiefs	Port Elizabeth
		Report	Damons 77' (o.g.)	Stadium: Nelson Mandela Bay Stadium; Referee: Jelly Chavani

4 November 2020 3	Kaizer Chiefs	0–0	TS Galaxy	Soweto
		Report		Stadium: FNB Stadium; Attendance: 0 Referee: Tshidiso Mkwanazi

21 November 2020 4	Lamontville Golden Arrows	2–2	Kaizer Chiefs	Durban
	Conco 49' (pen.); Sibiya 70'	Report	Castro 58', 65'	Stadium: Sugar Ray Xulu Stadium; Attendance: 0 Referee: Olani Kwinda

24 November 2020 5	Swallows FC	1–0	Kaizer Chiefs	Soweto
	Mhlongo 86'	Report		Stadium: Dobsonville Stadium; Attendance: 0 Referee: Masixole Bambiso

9 December 2020 6	Kaizer Chiefs	2–2	Black Leopards	Soweto
	Ngcobo 69'; Billiat 86'	Report	Karuru 12', 22'	Stadium: FNB Stadium; Attendance: 0 Referee: Luxolo Badi

15 December 2020 7	SuperSport United	2–1	Kaizer Chiefs	Atteridgeville
	Grobler 45'; Mbule 53'	Report	Manyama 89'	Stadium: Lucas Masterpieces Moripe Stadium; Attendance: 0 Referee: Victor Hlungwani

19 December 2020 8	Kaizer Chiefs	1–1	Bloemfontein Celtic	Soweto
	Akumu 9'	Report	Mangweni 67'	Stadium: FNB Stadium; Attendance: 0

9 January 2021 9	Kaizer Chiefs	0–2	Maritzburg United	Soweto
		Report	Moseamedi 66', 79'	Stadium: FNB Stadium; Attendance: 0 Referee: Eugene Mdluli

13 January 2021 10	AmaZulu	0–1	Kaizer Chiefs	Durban
		Report	Nurkovic 11'	Stadium: Jonsonn Kings Park Stadium; Attendance: 0 Referee: Philangenkosi Khumalo

16 January 2021 11	Cape Town City	1–2	Kaizer Chiefs	Cape Town
	Lakay 83'	Report	Ngcobo 7'; Mashiane 19'	Stadium: Cape Town Stadium; Attendance: 0

19 January 2021 12	Kaizer Chiefs	3–0	Tshakhuma Tsha Madzivhandila	Soweto
	Ngcobo 19'; Manyama 66'; Mashiane 90'	Report		Stadium: FNB Stadium; Attendance: 0

23 January 2021 13	Stellenbosch	0–0	Kaizer Chiefs	Stellenbosch
		Report		Stadium: Danie Craven Stadium; Attendance: 0

26 January 2021 14	Kaizer Chiefs	1–1	Baroka	Soweto
	Mosele 76' (o.g.)	Report	Masiya 53'	Stadium: FNB Stadium; Attendance: 0

30 January 2021 15	Orlando Pirates	2–1	Kaizer Chiefs	Soweto
	Lorch 38'; Ndlovu 80'	Report	Cardoso 85'	Stadium: Orlando Stadium; Attendance: 0

17 February 2021 16	Kaizer Chiefs	1–2	AmaZulu	Soweto
	Castro 67'	Report	Mulenga 45'; Majoro 85'	Stadium: FNB Stadium; Attendance: 0

20 February 2021 17	Kaizer Chiefs	1–1	SuperSport United	Soweto
	Frosler 29'	Report	Grobler 67'	Stadium: FNB Stadium; Attendance: 0

10 March 2021 18	Maritzburg United	1–1	Kaizer Chiefs	Maritzburg
	Kutumela 15'	Report	Manyama 88'	Stadium: Harry Gwala Stadium; Attendance: 0

21 March 2021 19	Kaizer Chiefs	1–0	Orlando Pirates	Soweto
	Nurkovic 54'	Report		Stadium: FNB Stadium; Attendance: 0

6 April 2021 20	Kaizer Chiefs	2–2	Stellenbosch	Soweto
	Castro 77'; Ngcobo 85'	Report	Sinkala 72'; Nange 80'	Stadium: FNB Stadium; Attendance: 0

15 April 2021 21	Baroka	1–1	Kaizer Chiefs	Polokwane
	Makgopa 81'	Report	Manyama 58'	Stadium: Peter Mokaba Stadium; Attendance: 0

21 April 2021 22	Kaizer Chiefs	1–2	Cape Town City	Soweto
	Baccus 66'	Report	Morris 22'; Ralani 51'	Stadium: FNB Stadium; Attendance: 0

25 April 2021 23	Mamelodi Sundowns	1–2	Kaizer Chiefs	Pretoria
	Sirino 31'	Report	Lebusa 72' (o.g.); Zuma 74'	Stadium: Loftus Versfeld Stadium; Attendance: 0

28 April 2021 24	Kaizer Chiefs	0–1	Chippa United	Soweto
		Report	Eva Nga 86'	Stadium: FNB Stadium; Attendance: 0

1 May 2021 25	Bloemfontein Celtic	2–2	Kaizer Chiefs	Bloemfontein
	Maema 22'; Letsoalo 54'	Report	Mashiane 3'; Mathoho 13'	Stadium: Seisa Ramabodu Stadium; Attendance: 0

4 May 2021 26	Tshakhuma Tsha Madzivhandila	2–1	Kaizer Chiefs	Polokwane
	Rakhale 42'; Mnyamane 90'	Report	Manyama 66'	Stadium: Peter Mokaba Stadium; Attendance: 0

12 May 2021 27	Kaizer Chiefs	1–1	Swallows	Soweto
	Castro 15'	Report	Malinga 8'	Stadium: FNB Stadium; Attendance: 0

26 May 2021 28	Black Leopards	2–1	Kaizer Chiefs	Thohoyandou
	Thutlwa 44', 64'	Report	Castro 10'	Stadium: Thohoyandou Stadium; Attendance: 0

2 June 2021 29	Kaizer Chiefs	3–2	Lamontville Golden Arrows	Soweto
	Manyama 31', 73', 79'	Report	Gumede 21'; Mathoho 62' (o.g.)	Stadium: FNB Stadium; Attendance: 0

5 June 2021 30	TS Galaxy	0–1	Kaizer Chiefs	Mbombela
		Report	Nurković 26'	Stadium: Mbombela Stadium; Attendance: 0

== MTN 8 ==
18 October 2020 Quarter-final	Kaizer Chiefs	2–1	Maritzburg United	Soweto
15:00 UTC (UTC+2)	Sasman 73', 75'	Report	Kutumela 35'	Stadium: FNB Stadium; Attendance: 0 Referee: Luxolo Badi

31 October 2020 Semi-final 1st Leg	Orlando Pirates	3–0	Kaizer Chiefs	Soweto
15:00 UTC (UTC+2)	Lepasa 26'; Pule 67'; Lorch 81'	Report		Stadium: Orlando Stadium; Attendance: 0

8 November 2020 Semi-final 2nd Leg	Kaizer Chiefs	0–2	Orlando Pirates	Soweto
15:00 UTC (UTC+2)			Makaringe 59'; Mntambo 80'	Stadium: FNB Stadium; Attendance: 0

== Nedbank Cup ==
7 February 2021 Round of 32	Kaizer Chiefs	1–2	Richards Bay	Soweto
17:00 (UTC+2)	Castro 76'	Report	Dube 29'; Vilane 90'	Stadium: FNB Stadium; Attendance: 0

== Champions League ==
=== Preliminary round ===
29 November 2020 First leg	PWD Bamenda (Cameroon)	0–1	(South Africa) Kaizer Chiefs	Limbe
15:00 UTC+1		Report	Mathoho 83'	Stadium: Limbe Stadium; Attendance: 0 (close doors); Referee: Gauthier Mbina (Gabon)

5 December 2020 Second leg	Kaizer Chiefs (South Africa)	0–0	(Cameroon) PWD Bamenda	Johannesburg
20:00 UTC+2		Report		Stadium: FNB Stadium; Attendance: 0 (close doors); Referee: João Goma (Angola)

=== First round ===
23 December 2020 First leg	Kaizer Chiefs (South Africa)	0–0	(Angola) 1º de Agosto	Johannesburg
18:00 UTC+2		Report		Stadium: FNB Stadium; Attendance: 0 (close doors); Referee: Ibrahim Ben Tsimanohitsy (Madagascar)

5 January 2021 Second leg	1º de Agosto (Angola)	0–1	(South Africa) Kaizer Chiefs	Luanda
16:00 UTC+1		Report	Castro 41'	Stadium: Estádio 11 de Novembro; Attendance: 0 (close doors); Referee: Brighton Chimene (Zimbabwe)

=== Group stage ===
==== Group C ====
Pos	Team	Pld	W	D	L	GF	GA	GD	Pts	Qualification	WAC	KZC	HOR	PET
1	(Morocco) Wydad AC	6	4	1	1	9	1	+8	13	Advance to knockout stage	—	4–0	2–0	2–0
2	(South Africa) Kaizer Chiefs	6	2	3	1	5	6	−1	9 (Note: Tied on head-to-head points (2), on head-to-head goal difference (0) and on head-to-head goals scored (2). Head-to-head away goals scored: Kaizer Chiefs 2, Horoya 0.)	Advance to knockout stage	1–0	—	0–0	2–0
3	(Guinea) Horoya	6	2	3	1	5	4	+1	9		0–0	2–2	—	2–0
4	(Angola) Petro de Luanda	6	0	1	5	0	8	−8	1		0–1	0–0	0–1	—

Source: Soccerway
Notes:

23 February 2021 Matchday 1	Kaizer Chiefs (South Africa)	0–0	(Guinea) Horoya	Johannesburg
16:00 (18:00 UTC+2)		Report		Stadium: FNB Stadium; Attendance: 0 (close doors); Referee: Joshua Bondo (Botswana)

28 February 2021 (Note: The Wydad AC v Kaizer Chiefs match, originally scheduled to be played at Stade Mohammed V, Casablanca on 13 February 2021, was postponed due to restrictions related to the COVID-19 pandemic imposed by Morocco on travelers from South Africa out of concern of the variant 501.V2. The match was later rescheduled to be played outside Morocco on 28 February 2021 at Stade du 4 Août, Ouagadougou (Burkina Faso).) Matchday 2	Wydad AC (Morocco)	4–0	(South Africa) Kaizer Chiefs	Ouagadougou (Burkina Faso)
16:00 (16:00 UTC+0)	Ounajem 7'; El Kaabi 44'; Msuva 86'; Jabrane 90+2' (pen.)	Report		Stadium: Stade du 4 Août; Attendance: 0 (close doors); Referee: Sadok Selmi (Tunisia)

6 March 2021 Matchday 3	Kaizer Chiefs (South Africa)	2–0	(Angola) Petro de Luanda	Johannesburg
16:00 (18:00 UTC+2)	Mathoho 30'; Mashiane 79'	Report		Stadium: FNB Stadium; Attendance: 0 (close doors); Referee: Bamlak Tessema Weyesa (Ethiopia)

16 March 2021 Matchday 4	Petro de Luanda (Angola)	0–0	(South Africa) Kaizer Chiefs	Luanda
16:00 (17:00 UTC+1)		Report		Stadium: Estádio 11 de Novembro; Attendance: 0 (close doors); Referee: Pacifique Ndabihawenimana (Burundi)

3 April 2021 Matchday 5	Kaizer Chiefs (South Africa)	1–0	(Morocco) Wydad AC	Johannesburg
16:00 (18:00 UTC+2)	Parker 48'	Report		Stadium: FNB Stadium; Attendance: 0 (close doors); Referee: Ibrahim Nour El Din (Egypt)

10 April 2021 Matchday 6	Horoya (Guinea)	2–2	(South Africa) Kaizer Chiefs	Conakry
19:00 (19:00 UTC+0)	Barry 45+2'; S. Camara 69'	Report	Cardoso 67' (pen.); Billiat 76'	Stadium: General Lansana Conté Stadium; Attendance: 0 (close doors); Referee: Bakary Gassama (Gambia)

=== knockout stage ===
==== Quarter-finals ====
15 May 2021 First leg	Kaizer Chiefs (South Africa)	4–0	(Tanzania) Simba	Johannesburg
16:00 (18:00 UTC+2)	Mathoho 6'; Nurković 34', 57'; Castro 63'	Report		Stadium: FNB Stadium; Attendance: 0 (close doors); Referee: Sidi Alioum (Cameroon)

22 May 2021 Second leg	Simba (Tanzania)	3–0	(South Africa) Kaizer Chiefs	Dar es Salaam
13:00 (16:00 UTC+3)	Bocco 24', 56'; Chama 86'	Report		Stadium: National Stadium; Attendance: 0 (close doors); Referee: Pacifique Ndabihawenimana (Burundi)

==== Semi-finals ====
19 June 2021 First leg	Wydad AC (Morocco)	0–1	(South Africa) Kaizer Chiefs	Casablanca
19:00 (20:00 UTC+1)		Report	Nurković 34'	Stadium: Stade Mohammed V Attendance: 0 (close doors); Referee: Maguette N'Diaye (Senegal)

26 June 2021 Second leg	Kaizer Chiefs (South Africa)	0–0	(Morocco) Wydad AC	Johannesburg
16:00 (18:00 UTC+2)		Report		Stadium: FNB Stadium; Attendance: 0 (close doors); Referee: Jean-Jacques Ndala Ngambo (DR Congo)

==== Final ====
17 July 2021	Kaizer Chiefs (South Africa)	0–3	(Egypt) Al Ahly	Casablanca
19:00 GMT (20:00 UTC+1)		Report	Sherif 53'; Magdy 64'; El Solia 74'	Stadium: Stade Mohammed V Referee: Pacifique Ndabihawenimana (Burundi)

== Squad information ==
=== Goalscorers ===
Includes all competitive matches. The list is sorted alphabetically by surname when total goals are equal.

== Transfers ==
=== Released ===
Date from	Position	Nationality	Name	To	Notes	Ref.
1 July 2020	CM	(South Africa)	George Maluleka	Mamelodi Sundowns	Released	
1 July 2020	RM	(South Africa)	Joseph Malongoane	Tshakhuma Tsha Madzivhandila	Released	
1 July 2020	AM	(South Africa)	Kabelo Mahlasela	Free agent	Released	
