= 2019–20 Kaizer Chiefs F.C. season =

Kaizer Chiefs
2019–20 season
- Chairman: Kaizer Motaung
- Manager: Ernst Middendorp
- Stadium: FNB Stadium; Moses Mabhida Stadium
- SA Premier Division: 2nd
- Nedbank Cup: Last 16
- Telkom Knockout: Semi-final
- Top goalscorer: League: Samir Nurkovic (13); All: Samir Nurkovic (14)
- Average home league attendance: 16,144

The 2019–20 season saw Kaizer Chiefs, a professional football club from Johannesburg, Gauteng, South Africa, compete in the South African Premier Division, in which they finished second, two points behind champions Mamelodi Sundowns. They also competed in the Nedbank Cup and Telkom Knockout, where they were eliminated in the last 16 and semi-final respectively.

== Season review ==
On 16 March 2020, all matches for the remainder of the week were postponed due to the COVID-19 pandemic, with matches later postponed indefinitely.

In June 2020, the league was given permission to resume, with it being announced the following month that the season would restart on 11 August 2020, with matches being played behind closed doors at neutral venues in Gauteng. It was announced that Chiefs would play their home matches at Orlando Stadium, the home ground of local rivals Orlando Pirates.

After spending most of the season at the top of the division, they eventually finished second after drawing 1–1 with Baroka in the final game of the season.

== Transfers ==
=== Transfers in ===
Date	Position	Name	From	Fee	Ref.
1 July 2019	FW	(Zambia) Lazarous Kambole	(Zambia) ZESCO United	Undisclosed	
1 July 2019	MF	(Ghana) James Kotei	(Tanzania) Simba SC	Free transfer	
2 July 2019	MF	(Australia) Kearyn Baccus	(Australia) Melbourne City	Free transfer	
2 July 2019	FW	(Serbia) Samir Nurković	(Slovakia) KFC Komárno	Free transfer	
31 July 2019	DF	(South Africa) Yagan Sasman	(South Africa) Ajax Cape Town	Free transfer	
15 January 2020	MF	(Kenya) Teddy Akumu	(Zambia) ZESCO United	Free transfer	

=== Transfers out ===
Date	Position	Name	To	Fee	Ref.
1 May 2019	GK	(Namibia) Virgil Vries	(South Africa) Moroka Swallows	Released	
25 June 2019	FW	(South Africa) Emmanuel Letlotlo	Free agent	Released	
30 June 2019	FW	(South Africa) Ryan Moon	(South Africa) Stellenbosch	Released	
2 August 2019	DF	(South Africa) Mario Booysen	(South Africa) AmaZulu	Released	
23 August 2019	MF	(Madagascar) Arohasina Andrianarimanana	(South Africa) Black Leopards	Released	
3 September 2019	DF	(South Africa) Letlhogonolo Mirwa	Free agent	Released	
October 2019	FW	(South Africa) Yusuf Bunting	Free agent	Released	
14 January 2020	DF	(South Africa) Lorenzo Gordinho	(South Africa) Bidvest Wits	Free transfer	
14 January 2020	MF	(Ghana) James Kotei	(Belarus) Slavia Mozyr	Released	

=== Loans out ===
Date	Position	Name	To	Date until	Ref.
28 January 2020	FW	(South Africa) Sizwe Twala	(South Africa) Moroka Swallows	End of season	
13 August 2019	FW	(South Africa) Itumeleng Shopane	(South Africa) Moroka Swallows	End of season	
13 August 2019	MF	(South Africa) Ayanda Rorwana	(South Africa) Moroka Swallows	End of season	
3 September 2019	MF	(South Africa) Given Thibedi	(South Africa) Moroka Swallows	End of season	
9 January 2020	MF	(South Africa) Kabelo Mahlasela	(South Africa) Polokwane City	End of season	

== Competitions ==
=== Overall record ===
Competition	First match	Last match	Starting round	Final position	Record							
Competition	First match	Last match	Starting round	Final position	Pld	W	D	L	GF	GA	GD	Win %
Premiership	4 August 2019	5 September 2020	Matchday 1	2nd	30	17	6	7	48	27	+21	56.67
Nedbank Cup	8 February 2020	22 February 2020	Last 32	Round of 16	2	1	1	0	2	1	+1	50.00
Telkom Knockout	19 October 2019	24 November 2019	Round of 16	Semi-final	3	0	2	1	4	5	−1	0.00
Total					35	18	9	8	54	33	+21	51.43

Last updated: 5 September 2020
Source: Competitions

=== Premiership ===
==== Results summary ====
Overall								Home						Away					
Pld	W	D	L	GF	GA	GD	Pts	W	D	L	GF	GA	GD	W	D	L	GF	GA	GD
30	17	6	7	48	27	+21	57	8	3	4	23	13	+10	9	3	3	25	14	+11

Last updated: 5 September 2020.
Source: see below

==== Results by match ====
Match	1	2	3	4	5	6	7	8	9	10	11	12	13	14	15	16	17	18	19	20	21	22	23	24	25	26	27	28	29	30
Ground	A	H	H	A	H	A	H	H	A	A	H	A	H	A	A	H	H	A	A	H	A	H	H	A	A	H	H	A	H	A
Result	W	W	D	W	L	W	W	W	W	W	W	W	W	D	L	W	W	D	W	L	W	L	D	W	L	D	L	L	W	D
Position	5	2	1	1	3	4	2	1	1	1	1	1	1	1	1	1	1	1	1	1	1	1	1	1	1	1	1	1	1	2

Updated to match(es) played on 5 September 2020. Source: see below
A = Away; H = Home; W = Win; D = Draw; L = Loss

==== League table ====
Pos	Team	Pld	W	D	L	GF	GA	GD	Pts	Qualification or relegation
1	Mamelodi Sundowns (C)	30	17	8	5	42	22	+20	59	Qualification for Champions League
2	Kaizer Chiefs	30	17	6	7	48	27	+21	57	Qualification for Champions League
3	Orlando Pirates	30	14	10	6	40	29	+11	52	Qualification for Confederation Cup
4	Bidvest Wits	30	14	10	6	33	22	+11	52	
5	SuperSport United	30	14	8	8	43	26	+17	50	

Updated to match(es) played on 2 July 2020. Source: Premier Soccer League
Rules for classification: 1) Points; 2) Goal difference; 3) Goals scored; 4) Head-to-head points; 5) Head-to-Head goal difference; 6) Head-to-Head goals scored; 7) Playoff; 8) Relegated (R); 9) Qualified to the next round (T)

==== Results ====
Win	Draw	Loss

Date	Opponent	Venue	Result (Note: Kaizer Chiefs' score written first)	Scorers	Ref.
4 August 2019	Highlands Park	Away	3–2	Manyama 5', 50', Mathoho 83'	
10 August 2019	Black Leopards	Home	1–0	Mathoho 12'	
24 August 2019	SuperSport United	Home	1–1	Nurković 14'	
27 August 2019	Cape Town City	Away	2–1	Cardoso 75', Baccus 80'	
14 September 2019	Polokwane City	Home	0–1	—	
24 September 2019	AmaZulu	Away	2–0	Castro 84', Billiat 90+3'	
28 September 2019	Baroka	Home	1–0	Manyama 39'	
1 October 2019	Lamontville Golden Arrows	Home	2–0	Cardoso 27', Sibisi 60' (o.g.)	
27 October 2019	Mamelodi Sundowns	Away	2–0	Nurković 7', 78'	
6 November 2019	Chippa United	Away	2–0	Zuma 67', 90+1'	
9 November 2019	Orlando Pirates	Home	3–2	Nyauza 1' (o.g.), Castro 28', Cardoso 84'	
27 November 2019	Stellenbosch	Away	4–0	Ngezana 11', Nurković 23', 76', Zuma 90+5'	
7 December 2019	Bloemfontein Celtic	Home	5–3	Nurković 21, 31, 61, Castro 47', 71'	
22 December 2019	Maritzburg United	Away	1–1	Manyama 21'	
4 January 2020	SuperSport United	Away	1–2	Cardoso 48'	
8 January 2020	Highlands Park	Home	3–0	Mathoho 27', Castro 57', 69'	
12 January 2020	Cape Town City	Home	3–0	Castro 11', Nurković 63', Mathoho 66'	
18 January 2020	Black Leopards	Away	1–1	Nurković 11'	
25 January 2020	Lamontville Golden Arrows	Away	1–0	Manyama 90+3'	
15 February 2020	Maritzburg United	Home	1–2	Nurković 78'	
29 February 2020	Orlando Pirates	Away	1–0	Manyama 30'	
7 March 2020	AmaZulu	Home	0–1	—	
12 August 2020	Bidvest Wits	Home (Note: Due to the COVID-19 pandemic, all teams were allocated neutral venues for their home matches.)	1–1	Nurković 36'	
15 August 2020	Polokwane City	Away	3–2	Katsande 71', Akumu 75', Nurković 76'	
19 August 2020	Bloemfontein Celtic	Away	1–3	Mathoho 35'	
23 August 2020	Stellenbosch	Home	1–1	Kambole 69'	
27 August 2020	Mamelodi Sundowns	Home	0–1	—	
30 August 2020	Bidvest Wits	Away	0–1	—	
2 September 2020	Chippa United	Home	1–0	Billiat 9'	
5 September 2020	Baroka	Away	1–1	Billiat 39'	

=== Nedbank Cup ===
Win	Draw	Loss

Round	Date	Opponent	Venue	Result	Scorers	Ref.
Last 32	8 February 2020	Royal Eagles	Home	1–0	Manyama 70'	
Last 16	22 February 2020	Highlands Park	Away	1–1 (a.e.t.) (Note: Highlands Park win 5–4 on penalties)	Motsepe 63' (o.g.)	

=== Telkom Knockout ===
Win	Draw	Loss

Round	Date	Opponent	Venue	Result	Scorers	Ref.
Round of 16	19 October 2019	Cape Town City	Away	1–1 (a.e.t.) (Note: Kaizer Chiefs win 4–2 on penalties)	Nurković 84'	
Quarter-final	2 November 2020	Orlando Pirates	Home	2–2 (a.e.t.)	Cardoso 90+4'	
Semi-final	24 November 2020	Maritzburg United	Home	1–2	Sasman 78'	

== Squad statistics ==
As of match played 5 September 2020

=== Appearances and goals ===
No.	Pos	Nat	Player	Total		Premiership		Nedbank Cup		Telkom Knockout	
No.	Pos	Nat	Player	Apps	Goals	Apps	Goals	Apps	Goals	Apps	Goals
2	DF	(South Africa) RSA	Ramahlwe Mphahlele	6	0	1+5	0	0	0	0	0
3	DF	(South Africa) RSA	Eric Mathoho	31	5	27	5	2	0	2	0
4	DF	(South Africa) RSA	Daniel Cardoso	35	5	30	4	2	0	3	1
5	MF	(Kenya) KEN	Teddy Akumu	12	1	4+6	1	1+1	0	0	0
6	MF	(Australia) AUS	Kearyn Baccus	21	1	13+5	1	1	0	2	0
7	FW	(Zambia) ZAM	Lazarous Kambole	17	1	11+5	1	0	0	0+1	0
8	FW	(Colombia) COL	Leonardo Castro	22	8	16+2	7	1	0	3	1
9	FW	(Serbia) SRB	Samir Nurković	31	14	25+1	13	2	0	2+1	1
10	MF	(South Africa) RSA	Siphelele Ntshangase	1	0	1	0	0	0	0	0
11	MF	(Zimbabwe) ZIM	Khama Billiat	25	3	17+4	3	1+1	0	2	0
12	MF	(South Africa) RSA	George Maluleka	24	0	15+4	0	1+1	0	2+1	0
18	DF	(South Africa) RSA	Kgotso Moleko	14	0	11+2	0	1	0	0	0
19	DF	(South Africa) RSA	Happy Mashiane	2	0	0+2	0	0	0	0	0
20	DF	(South Africa) RSA	Yagan Sasman	22	1	17+1	0	1	0	3	1
21	MF	(South Africa) RSA	Lebogang Manyama	32	7	27	6	2	1	3	0
22	MF	(South Africa) RSA	Philani Zulu	6	0	2+4	0	0	0	0	0
25	FW	(South Africa) RSA	Bernard Parker	32	0	19+8	0	1+1	0	2+1	0
26	DF	(South Africa) RSA	Lorenzo Gordinho	5	0	1+4	0	0	0	0	0
28	MF	(South Africa) RSA	Dumisani Zuma	28	3	2+22	3	0+1	0	0+3	0
30	DF	(South Africa) RSA	Siyabonga Ngezana	8	1	4+4	1	0	0	0	0
31	MF	(Zimbabwe) ZIM	Willard Katsande	28	1	20+4	1	2	0	2	0
32	GK	(South Africa) RSA	Itumeleng Khune	6	0	4	0	2	0	0	0
36	DF	(South Africa) RSA	Siphosakhe Ntiya-Ntiya	18	0	12+4	0	1	0	0+1	0
37	MF	(South Africa) RSA	Nkosingiphile Ngcobo	2	0	1+1	0	0	0	0	0
40	GK	(Nigeria) NGA	Daniel Akpeyi	27	0	24+1	0	0	0	2	0
41	DF	(South Africa) RSA	Reeve Frosler	26	0	21+2	0	1	0	2	0
44	GK	(South Africa) RSA	Bruce Bvuma	4	0	2+1	0	0	0	1	0
45	MF	(South Africa) RSA	Njabulo Blom	5	0	2+1	0	0	0	2	0
46	MF	(South Africa) RSA	Keletso Sifama	2	0	1+1	0	0	0	0	0
Players away from Kaizer Chiefs on loan:
Players who left Kaizer Chiefs during the season:

=== Goal scorers ===
Place	Position	Nation	Number	Name	Premiership	Nedbank Cup	Telkom Knockout	Total
1	FW	(Serbia)	9	Samir Nurković	13	0	1	14
2	FW	(Colombia)	8	Leonardo Castro	7	0	1	8
3	MF	(South Africa)	21	Lebogang Manyama	6	1	0	7
4	DF	(South Africa)	3	Eric Mathoho	5	0	0	5
4	DF	(South Africa)	4	Daniel Cardoso	4	0	1	5
6	MF	(Zimbabwe)	11	Khama Billiat	3	0	0	3
6	MF	(South Africa)	28	Dumisani Zuma	3	0	0	3
6				Own goal	2	1	0	3
9	DF	(South Africa)	30	Siyabonga Ngezana	1	0	0	1
9	MF	(Kenya)	5	Teddy Akumu	1	0	0	1
9	MF	(Australia)	6	Kearyn Baccus	1	0	0	1
9	MF	(Zimbabwe)	31	Willard Katsande	1	0	0	1
9	FW	(Zambia)	7	Lazarous Kambole	1	0	0	1
9	DF	(South Africa)	20	Yagan Sasman	0	0	1	1
				TOTALS	48	2	4	54

=== Clean sheets ===
Place	Position	Nation	Number	Name	Premiership	Nedbank Cup	Telkom Knockout	Total
1	GK	(Nigeria)	40	Daniel Akpeyi	9	0	0	9
2	GK	(South Africa)	32	Itumeleng Khune	2	1	0	3
3	GK	(South Africa)	44	Bruce Bvuma	1	0	0	1
				TOTALS	11	1	0	12

Itumeleng Khune & Daniel Akpeyi both played in Kaizer Chiefs' 1-0 victory over Baroka on 28 September 2019

=== Disciplinary record ===
Number	Nation	Position	Name	Premiership		Nedbank Cup		Telkom Knockout		Total	
Number	Nation	Position	Name	Booked	Sent off (straight red)	Booked	Sent off (straight red)	Booked	Sent off (straight red)	Booked	Sent off (straight red)
3	(South Africa)	DF	Eric Mathoho	1	1	1	0	1	0	3	1
4	(South Africa)	DF	Daniel Cardoso	3	0	0	0	0	0	1	0
5	(Zimbabwe)	MF	Teddy Akumu	1	0	0	0	0	0	1	0
6	(Australia)	MF	Kearyn Baccus	1	0	0	0	0	0	1	0
7	(Zambia)	FW	Lazarous Kambole	1	0	0	0	0	0	1	0
8	(Colombia)	FW	Leonardo Castro	1	0	0	0	1	0	2	0
9	(Serbia)	FW	Samir Nurković	7	0	0	0	2	0	9	0
11	(Zimbabwe)	MF	Khama Billiat	1	0	0	0	0	0	1	0
12	(South Africa)	MF	George Maluleka	3	0	0	0	1	0	4	0
18	(South Africa)	DF	Kgotso Moleko	1	0	0	0	0	0	1	0
19	(South Africa)	DF	Happy Mashiane	1	0	0	0	0	0	1	0
20	(South Africa)	DF	Yagan Sasman	1	0	0	0	1	0	2	0
21	(South Africa)	MF	Lebogang Manyama	3	0	0	0	1	0	4	0
25	(South Africa)	FW	Bernard Parker	2	0	0	0	0	0	2	0
26	(South Africa)	DF	Lorenzo Gordinho	1	0	0	0	0	0	1	0
28	(South Africa)	MF	Dumisani Zuma	1	0	0	0	0	0	1	0
30	(South Africa)	DF	Siyabonga Ngezana	1	0	0	0	0	0	1	0
31	(Zimbabwe)	MF	Willard Katsande	7	0	0	0	1	0	8	0
36	(South Africa)	DF	Siphosakhe Ntiya-Ntiya	2	0	0	0	0	0	2	0
40	(Nigeria)	GK	Daniel Akpeyi	5	0	0	0	0	0	5	0
41	(South Africa)	DF	Reeve Frosler	3	0	1	0	1	0	5	0
44	(South Africa)	GK	Bruce Bvuma	1	0	0	0	0	0	1	0
45	(South Africa)	MF	Njabulo Blom	0	0	0	0	1	0	1	0
Players away on loan:
Players who left Kaizer Chiefs during the season:
			TOTALS	48	1	2	0	10	0	60	1
