= 2021–22 Nedbank Cup =

ke yona (the one)

Tournament details
- Country: South Africa
- Teams: 32

The 2021–22 Nedbank Cup was the 2021–22 edition of South Africa's premier knockout club football (soccer) competition, the Nedbank Cup.

Mamelodi Sundowns won the competition after defeating Marumo Gallants in the final.

== Preliminary rounds ==
Eight teams from the SAFA Second Division (called the ABC Motsepe League for sponsorship reasons) qualify for the round of 32. One team from each of the nine provinces is selected, with two teams drawn to play each other in a knockout to reduce the number to eight. The nine teams from the provinces were:

- Western Cape – Santos FC
- Northern cape – NC Pro`s
- Eastern Cape – Sinenkani FC
- North West – Black Eagles
- KZN – Summerfield Dynamos
- Limpopo – Mikhado FC
- Free State – Mathaithai FC
- Gauteng – African All Stars
- Mpumalanga – Sivutsa Stars

Mathaithai and Mikhado were selected to play each other, with Mathaithai winning the playoff.

20 November 2021
15:0 SAST

Mathaithai Football Club	1–0	Mikhado FC
Doctor Mmotong 86'	Report

Sinaba Stadium, Benoni, Gauteng
Attendance: 0 due to the COVID-19 pandemic in South Africa

Eight teams from the National First Division also qualify, with the sixteen teams meeting in a preliminary round.

14 December 2021	Jomo Cosmos F.C.	0–0 (2–4 p)	Uthongathi F.C.	Vosloorus
15:0 SAST		Report		Stadium: VOSLOORUS STADIUM; Referee: Jelly Chavani

14 December 2021	TS Sporting F.C.	3–1	JDR Stars F.C.	Kabokweni
15:0 SAST	Q. Debouto 35' (pen.); S. Mtombeni 66'; S. Sithole 82'	Report	M. Dineka	Stadium: Kabokweni Stadium; Referee: Thokozani Mkhize

14 December 2021	Black Leopards	1–2	Free State Stars	Polokwane
15:0 SAST	T. Mashoene 78'	Report	T. Moleleki 42'; M. Mathonsi 87'	Stadium: Old Peter Mokaba Stadium; Referee: Masixole Bambiso

15 December 2021	Richards Bay F.C.	0–0 (5–4 p)	Polokwane City F.C.	Durban
15:0 SAST		Report		Stadium: King Goodwill Zwelithini Stadium; Referee: X. Sitela

15 December 2021	Venda Football Academy	3–1	Pretoria Callies F.C.	Thohoyandou
15:0 SAST	T. Magalela 38' (62); D. Mudau 89'	Report	L. Balfour 60'	Stadium: Thohoyandou Stadium; Referee: M. Mabuto

15 December 2021	University of Pretoria F.C.	2–1	Hungry Lions F.C.	Hatfield, Pretoria
15:0 SAST	S. Julies 38'; S. Mpedi 82'	Report	K. Mogotlane 85'	Stadium: Tuks Stadium; Referee: S. Velapi

15 December 2021	Platinum City Rovers	3–2	Cape Town Spurs	Potchefstroom
15:0 SAST	O. Manyisa 31' (pen.); E. Mokwana 90'; T. Ntlaba 101'	Report	Igor 4'; K. Mosiatlhaga 27'	Stadium: Olën Park; Referee: M. Thulo

16 December 2021	Tshakhuma Tsha Madzivhandila F.C.	2–1	Cape Town All Stars	Thohoyandou
15:0 SAST	B. Dolamo 27'; R. Manzini 66'	Report	D. Booysen 84'	Stadium: Thohoyandou Stadium; Referee: M. Lekwape

== Round of 32 ==
The last 32 of 2021–22 is made up of 16 teams from the South African Premier Division, 8 teams from the National First Division and 8 from the SAFA Second Division.

4 February 2022	Richards Bay	0–4	Mamelodi Sundowns	Durban
		Report	B.Ralani 24' R.Reuck 55' P.Šafranko 70' P.Shalulile 88'	Stadium: Richards Bay Sports Stadium

4 February 2022	University of Pretoria	2–0	Chippa United	Pretoria
	L.Maqoko 80' K.Pheenane 81'	Report		Stadium: Tuks Stadium

5 February 2022	Moroka Swallows	2–1	TS Sporting	Dobsonville, Soweto
	Y.Sasman 48' R.Gamildien 52'	Report		Stadium: Dobsonville Stadium

5 February 2022	Tshakhuma Tsha Madzivhandila	1–1 (7–6 p)	Golden Arrows	Limpopo
	T.Matete 68'	Report	S.Conco 75'	Stadium: Thohoyandou Stadium

6 February 2022	Orlando Pirates	1–0	AmaZulu	Orlando, Soweto
	D.Hotto 53'	Report		Stadium: Orlando Stadium

9 February 2022	Venda Football Academy	3–1	African All Stars	Limpopo
		Report		Stadium: Thohoyandou Stadium

9 February 2022	Maritzburg United	0–1	Supersport United	Harry Gwala Stadium
		Report

11 February 2022	Uthongathi	0–1	Summerfield Dynamos	Princess Magogo Stadium
		Report

11 February 2022	Stellenbosch	0–1	Baroka	Danie Craven Stadium
		Report

12 February 2022	NC Professionals	0–2	Mathaithai	Tafel Lager Park
		Report

12 February 2022	Platinum City Rovers	1–1 (3–2 p)	Sekhukhune United	Olen Park
		Report

12 February 2022	Royal AM	2–1	Cape Town City	Durban
		Report		Stadium: Chatsworth Stadium

12 February 2022	Sinenkani	1–1 (10–9 p)	Free State Stars	Walter Sisulu University Stadium
		Report

12 February 2022	Kaizer Chiefs	0–1	TS Galaxy	Nasrec
		Report		Stadium: FNB Stadium

13 February 2022	Marumo Gallants	2–0	Santos	Peter Mokaba Stadium
		Report

13 February 2022	Black Eagles	3–2	Sivutsa Stars	Royal Bafokeng Stadium
		Report

== Round of 16 ==
8 March 2022	Mamelodi Sundowns	6–0	Mathaithai	Lucas Masterpieces Moripe Stadium
		Report

9 March 2022	Marumo Gallants	1–1 (5–4 p)	Orlando Pirates	Peter Mokaba Stadium
		Report

11 March 2022	Venda Football Academy	3–3 (3–4 p)	University of Pretoria	Thohoyandou Stadium
		Report

11 March 2022	Moroka Swallows	0–1	Royal AM	Dobsonville Stadium
		Report

12 March 2022	Sinenkani	0–3	Tshakhuma Tsha Madzivhandila	Mthatha Stadium
		Report

12 March 2022	Platinum City Rovers	0–1	Supersport United	Olen Park
		Report

13 March 2022	Summerfield Dynamos	1–0	Black Eagles	Chatsworth Stadium
		Report

13 March 2022	TS Galaxy	1–1 (3–5 p)	Baroka	Mbombela Stadium
		Report

== Quarter-finals ==
8 April 2022	Tshakhuma Tsha Madzivhandila	3–2	Supersport United	Thohoyandou Stadium
		Report

9 April 2022	Marumo Gallants	1–0	Baroka	Peter Mokaba Stadium
		Report

9 April 2022	Mamelodi Sundowns	5–0	Summerfield Dynamos	Atteridgeville
		Report		Stadium: Lucas Masterpieces Moripe Stadium

10 April 2022	Royal AM	3–2	University of Pretoria	Chatsworth Stadium
		Report

== Semi-finals ==
29 April 2022	Tshakhuma Tsha Madzivhandila	0–1	Marumo Gallants	Thohoyandou Stadium
19:00		Report

30 April 2022	Royal AM	1–2	Mamelodi Sundows	Chatsworth Stadium
19:00		Report

== Final ==
28 May 2022	Mamelodi Sundows	2–1 (a.e.t.)	Marumo Gallants	Phokeng
18:00		Report		Stadium: Royal Bafokeng Stadium; Referee: Masixole Bambiso
