= Sasman =

Sasman may refer to:

== People ==
- Yagan Sasman, a South African footballer
- David Sasman, a founding leader of the National Party South Africa

== Other uses ==
- Rural Municipality of Sasman No. 336, Saskatchewan, Canada
- An SAS-man, a member of the Special Air Service
