= Vukile Mngqibisa =

South African soccer player

Personal information
- Date of birth: 28 November 1987 (age 38)
- Place of birth: Katlehong, South Africa
- Height: 1.78 m (5 ft 10 in)
- Position: Centre-back

Senior career*
Years	Team	Apps	(Gls)
–2012	Sivutsa Stars		
2012–2015	Polokwane City		
2015–2016	University of Pretoria		
2017–2018	AmaZulu	4	(0)
- * Club domestic league appearances and goals

Vukile Mngqibisa (born 28 November 1987) is a South African former professional soccer player who played as a centre-back. Following his retirement from playing, he worked as a truck driver.
