= Jesta Sidell =

South African politician (born 1977)

Member of the Executive Council for Economic Development and Tourism, Mpumalanga
- Incumbent
- Assumed office 15 July 2025
- Preceded by: Makhosazane Masilela

Executive Mayor of Ehlanzeni District Municipality
- In office 2016–2025
- Preceded by: Lettie Shongwe
- Succeeded by: Terrence Shabangu

Speaker of Mbombela Local Municipality
- In office 2011–2016
- Preceded by: Jimmy Mohlala
- Succeeded by: Mandla Msibi

Personal details
- Born: November 1, 1977 (age 48) Kabokweni, Mbombela, South Africa
- Party: African National Congress (ANC)
- Occupation: Politician, administrator

Jesta Sidell (born 1 November 1977) is a South African politician and administrator currently serving as the Member of the Executive Council (MEC) for Economic Development and Tourism in the Mpumalanga Provincial Government. She is a senior member of the African National Congress (ANC) and previously served as the Executive Mayor of the Ehlanzeni District Municipality. She served as the Regional Secretary of the African National Congress Women's League in the Ehlanzeni region and was elected the provincial chairperson of the South African Local Government Association (SALGA in January 2020.

She was born in Kabokweni, a township near Mbombela in the Mpumalanga province and began her schooling at Victory Park Primary School, completing at Middleburg Combined School.

Sidell has been involved in politics since 2000, when she was elected as a Proportional Representation (PR) Councillor in both the Mbombela Local Municipality and Ehlanzeni District Municipality. She went on to become the Speaker of the Mbombela Local Municipality from 2011 to 2016. In 2016, she was elected Executive Mayor of Ehlanzeni District Municipality, a role she held until her appointment to the provincial cabinet in 2025.

On 15 July 2025, Sidell was appointed as the MEC for Economic Development and Tourism in Mpumalanga following a cabinet reshuffle by Premier Mandla Ndlovu. She succeeded Makhosazane Masilela in the portfolio.

== Education ==
- A diploma in Advanced Municipal Governance from the University of Johannesburg
- A Project Management course from Wits University
- An Executive Leadership Programme from the University of Pretoria
