= Kabelo Mahlasela =

South African footballer (born 1991)

Personal information
- Date of birth: 13 February 1991 (age 35)
- Place of birth: Sebokeng, South Africa
- Position: Midfielder

Team information
- Current team: Royal AM
- Number: 12

Youth career
- –2012: Orlando Pirates

Senior career*
Years	Team	Apps	(Gls)
2012–2014	Roses United	7	(1)
2013–2014	→ Sivutsa Stars (loan)	28	(2)
2014–2015	Royal Eagles	22	(5)
2015–2018	Bloemfontein Celtic	33	(2)
2016	→ Royal Eagles (loan)	10	(2)
2018–2020	Kaizer Chiefs	11	(0)
2020	→ Polokwane City (loan)	6	(0)
2020–	Royal AM	74	(2)
- * Club domestic league appearances and goals as of 1 August 2024

Kabelo Mahlasela (born 13 February 1991) is a South African soccer player who plays for South African Premier Division side Royal AM.

== Career ==
=== Early career ===
Born in Sebokeng, Mahlasela played youth football at Orlando Pirates, but failed to make a first team appearance there. He joined Roses United in 2012 before going on to play for Sivutsa Stars on loan and later Royal Eagles.

=== Bloemfontein Celtic ===
In August 2015, Mahlasela joined Bloemfontein Celtic on a three-year contract. He made his debut for Celtic, and only appearance for the club over the course of the 2015–16 season on 18 December 2015, coming on as a late substitute in a 2–1 defeat away to Chippa United. In January 2016, Mahlasela rejoined Royal Eagles on loan until the end of the 2015–16 season. During his return to Royal Eagles, he made ten appearances, in which he scored two goals.

The 2016–17 season saw Mahlasela play more regularly for the club, making 20 appearances in which he scored one goal, whilst in the 2017–18 season, he made 12 appearances for the club, in which he scored once.

=== Kaizer Chiefs ===
On 3 January 2018, he joined Kaizer Chiefs on a two-and-a-half-year deal. However, just 3 days later, in his first training session for the club, he suffered a knee injury, ruling him out for the following 8 months. Following his return from injury, he made his debut for Kaizer Chiefs on 7 August 2018 as a late substitute in a home defeat to Bidvest Wits. However, he struggled to hold down a first-team place for the club, making just 11 appearances for the club during the 2018–19 season.

Mahlasela failed to appear for Kaizer Chiefs in the league during the first half of the 2019–20 season, and as a result, he joined Polokwane City on loan until the end of the season in January 2020. He appeared for the first time for Polokwane City on 11 January 2020, coming on as a first-half substitute in a 1–0 defeat away at Baroka. In April 2020, Mahlasela revealed he was enjoying playing for the club and pleased that he was playing regular football. He was released by Chiefs at the end of the season.

== Style of play ==
Former Kaizer Chiefs midfielder Frank Makua described him as 'a player that will give you flair', though admits Mahlasela struggled at Kaizer Chiefs because of his style of play.
