= Njabulo Blom =

South African footballer (born 1999)

Personal information
- Full name: Njabulo Blom
- Date of birth: 11 December 1996 (age 29)
- Place of birth: Dobsonville, South Africa
- Height: 1.73 m (5 ft 8 in)
- Position: Defensive midfielder

Team information
- Current team: Stellenbosch (on loan from Borneo Samarinda)
- Number: 35

Youth career
- –2019: Kaizer Chiefs

Senior career*
Years	Team	Apps	(Gls)
2019–2022	Kaizer Chiefs	69	(0)
2023–2025	St. Louis City SC	42	(2)
2024–2025	→ Kaizer Chiefs (loan)	18	(0)
2025–2026	Thep Xanh Nam Dinh	0	(0)
2026–	Borneo Samarinda	0	(0)
2026–	→ Stellenbosch (loan)	0	(0)

International career
2019	South Africa U20	7	(0)
2021–2023	South Africa	2	(0)
- * Club domestic league appearances and goals as of 17 May 2025

Njabulo Blom (born 11 December 1996) is a South African professional soccer player who plays as a defensive midfielder for South African Premiership club Stellenbosch, on loan from Indonesian club Borneo Samarinda.

== Club career ==
Born in Dobsonville, (Note: Njabulo Blom at WorldFootball.net) Blom started his career at Kaizer Chiefs, and made his debut on 1 October 2019, starting against Lamontville Golden Arrows, before appearing again for the club on 27 October 2019 against Mamelodi Sundowns.

On 23 December 2022, Blom joined Major League Soccer side St. Louis City SC ahead of their 2023 expansion season.

On 3 September 2024, Blom returned to his former club Kaizer Chiefs on loan for the 2024-25 season, with an option to buy.

On 18 July 2025, Blom moved to Vietnam, signing for V.League 1 side Thep Xanh Nam Dinh.

== International career ==
Blom appeared for the South Africa national under-20 soccer team at the 2019 FIFA U-20 World Cup and the 2019 Africa U-20 Cup of Nations.

He made his debut for the South Africa national soccer team on 6 September 2021 in a World Cup qualifier against Ghana, a 1–0 home victory. He substituted Percy Tau in the 77th minute.

== Career statistics ==
As of Sep 23, 2023

Appearances and goals by club, season and competition
Club	Season	League			Nedbank Cup		Telkom Knockout		Continental (Note: Appearance(s) in CAF Champions League, CONCACAF Champions League)		Other		Total	
Club	Season	Division	Apps	Goals	Apps	Goals	Apps	Goals	Apps	Goals	Apps	Goals	Apps	Goals
Kaizer Chiefs	2019–20 (Note: Njabulo Blom at Soccerway. Retrieved 3 July 2020.)	South African Premier Division	3	0	0	0	2	0	—		0	0	5	0
Kaizer Chiefs	2020–21	South African Premier Division	27	0	1	0	0	0	13	0	3 (Note: Appearance(s) in MTN 8)	0	44	0
St. Louis City SC	2023	Major League Soccer	23	1	0	0	0	0	0	0	—		23	1
Career total			53	1	1	0	2	0	13	0	3	0	72	1

== Honors ==
St. Louis City SC

- Western Conference (regular season): 2023
