= Siyabonga Ngezana =

South African soccer player

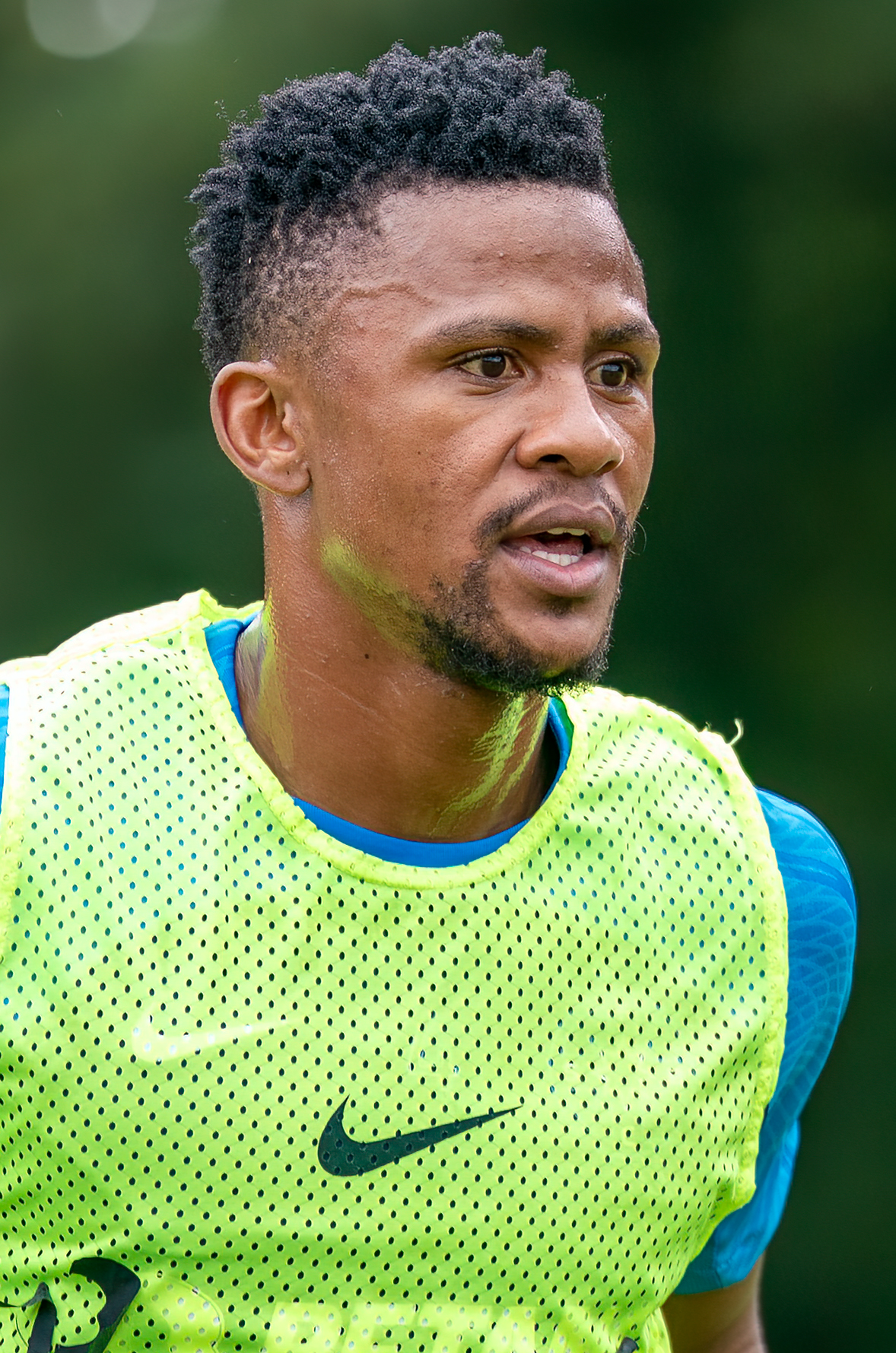
- Ngezana with FCSB in 2023

Personal information
- Full name: Siyabonga Ngezana
- Date of birth: 15 July 1997 (age 29)
- Place of birth: Sebokeng, South Africa
- Height: 1.88 m (6 ft 2 in)
- Position: Defender

Team information
- Current team: FCSB
- Number: 30

Youth career
- Orlando Pirates
- –2017: Kaizer Chiefs

Senior career*
Years	Team	Apps	(Gls)
2017–2023	Kaizer Chiefs	95	(6)
2023–	FCSB	71	(1)

International career^{‡}
2017	South Africa U20	1	(0)
2019	South Africa U23	4	(0)
2018–	South Africa	14	(0)
Medal record
Men's football
Representing South Africa
U-23 Africa Cup of Nations
Bronze medal – third place	2019 Egypt	U-23 Team
- * Club domestic league appearances and goals as of 18 May 2026 ‡ National team caps and goals as of 4 January 2026

Siyabonga Ngezana (born 15 July 1997) is a South African professional soccer player who plays as a defender for Liga I club FCSB and the South Africa national team.

In November 2023, The South African awarded Ngezana the award for the Best South African Footballer In Europe.

== International career ==
On 1 December 2025, Ngezana was called up to the South Africa squad for the 2025 Africa Cup of Nations.

== Career statistics ==
=== Club ===
As of match played 18 May 2026

Appearances and goals by club, season and competition
Club	Season	League			National cup (Note: Includes Nedbank Cup, Cupa României)		League cup (Note: Includes Carling Knockout Cup)		Continental		Other		Total	
Club	Season	Division	Apps	Goals	Apps	Goals	Apps	Goals	Apps	Goals	Apps	Goals	Apps	Goals
Kaizer Chiefs	2017–18	South African Premiership	15	1	0	0	3	0	—		—		18	1
Kaizer Chiefs	2018–19	South African Premiership	12	2	0	0	2	0	0	0	3 (Note: Appearances in MTN 8)	0	17	2
Kaizer Chiefs	2019–20	South African Premiership	8	1	0	0	0	0	—		—		8	1
Kaizer Chiefs	2020–21	South African Premiership	26	0	0	0	—		13 (Note: Appearances in CAF Champions League)	0	2	0	41	0
Kaizer Chiefs	2021–22	South African Premiership	15	0	1	0	—		—		0	0	16	0
Kaizer Chiefs	2022–23	South African Premiership	19	2	4	0	—		—		0	0	23	2
Kaizer Chiefs	Total		95	6	5	0	5	0	13	0	5	0	123	6
FCSB	2023–24	Liga I	30	0	1	1	—		0	0	—		31	1
FCSB	2024–25	Liga I	23	1	1	0	—		16 (Note: Five appearances in UEFA Champions League, eleven appearances in UEFA Europa League)	0	1 (Note: Appearance in Supercupa României)	0	41	1
FCSB	2025–26	Liga I	18	0	1	0	—		14 (Note: Four appearances in UEFA Champions League, ten appearances and one goal in UEFA Europa League)	1	1	0	34	1
FCSB	2026–27	Liga I	0	0	0	0	—		0	0	—		0	0
FCSB	Total		71	1	3	1	—		30	1	2	0	106	3
Career total			166	7	8	1	5	0	43	1	7	0	229	9

=== International ===
As of matches played on 4 January 2026

Appearances and goals by national team and year
National team	Year	Apps	Goals
South Africa	2018	2	0
South Africa	2024	5	0
South Africa	2025	7	0
Total		14	0

== Honours ==
Kaizer Chiefs

- Nedbank Cup runner-up: 2018–19
- Carling Black Label Cup: 2021
- CAF Champions League runner-up: 2020–21

FCSB

- Liga I: 2023–24, 2024–25
- Supercupa României: 2024, 2025

South Africa U23

- U-23 Africa Cup of Nations third place: 2019

Individual

- The South African Best South African Footballer in Europe: 2023
- Liga I Team of the Season: 2023–24, 2024–25
- SuperLiga Defender of the Season: 2024
