= Lowveld massacre =

The Lowveld massacre was an incident that occurred on 11 March 1986 at Kabokweni, in the then KaNgwane bantustan (now part of Mpumalanga province) of South Africa, when security forces opened fire on thousands of young people who had gathered outside the magistrate's court to protest during the trial of their fellow students.

== Preceding events ==
The massacre started with the killing of a student during a protest. During the funeral of the student, the army and the police shot at the mourners and arrested 26 students without provocation. At the trial of the 26 students there were further shootings of the students. Many were injured and some were killed.

== Media and popular culture ==
South African actor and playwright Mcedisi Shabangu has written a play based on this massacre.
