= Emmanuel Letlotlo =

South African footballer

Personal information
- Full name: Emmanuel Letlotlo
- Date of birth: 15 November 1995 (age 30)
- Place of birth: Soweto, South Africa
- Height: 1.75 m (5 ft 9 in)
- Position: Forward

Team information
- Current team: Postmasburg FC

Youth career
- –2016: Kaizer Chiefs

Senior career*
Years	Team	Apps	(Gls)
2016–2019	Kaizer Chiefs	5	(0)
2018	→ Baroka (loan)	0	(0)
2020–	Royal AM	1	(0)
- * Club domestic league appearances and goals as of 16:08, 17 February 2021 (UTC)

Emmanuel Letlotlo (born 15 November 1995) is a South African soccer player who plays as a forward for ABC Motsepe League side Postmasburg FC.

== Career ==
Born in Soweto, Letlotlo signed a three-year contract with ABSA Premiership side Kaizer Chiefs on 31 May 2016 after becoming the top scorer in the reserve league. He made his professional debut for the club on 23 August 2016 in the league against Bidvest Wits. He came on as a 56th-minute substitute in the 56th minute for George Lebese as Kaizer Chiefs lost 2–1.

In summer 2018, he signed for Baroka on loan.

He was released by Kaizer Chiefs in summer 2019.

In December 2020, he signed with Royal AM of the National First Division on a deal until the end of the season.

== Career statistics ==
As of 25 October 2016

Club	Season	League			Domestic Cup		League Cup		Continental		Total	
Club	Season	Division	Apps	Goals	Apps	Goals	Apps	Goals	Apps	Goals	Apps	Goals
Kaizer Chiefs	2016–17	Premier Division	1	0	1	0	0	0	0	0	2	0
Career total			1	0	1	0	0	0	0	0	2	0
