= David Booysen (soccer) =

South African football defender

Personal information
- Full name: David Carl Booysen
- Date of birth: 25 May 1989 (age 37)
- Place of birth: Cape Town, South Africa
- Position: Centre back

Youth career
- Ajax Cape Town

Senior career*
Years	Team	Apps	(Gls)
2010–2016	Maritzburg United	108	(1)
2016–2017	Free State Stars	6	(0)
2017–2018	Stellenbosch	16	(1)
2018	Ubuntu	7	(1)
2018–2019	Royal Eagles	14	(0)
2019–2020	Steenberg United	14	(0)
2020–2022	Cape Town All Stars	20	(0)
- * Club domestic league appearances and goals as of 1 May 2023

David Booysen (born 25 May 1989 in Cape Town, Western Cape) is a South African football (soccer) defender who last plays for Cape Town All Stars.

== Personal life ==
His older brother, Mario Booysen, is also a footballer.
