= Gregory Damons =

South African soccer player

Personal information
- Date of birth: 13 June 1995 (age 31)
- Place of birth: Gelvandale, South Africa
- Position: Defender

Team information
- Current team: Moroka Swallows
- Number: 18

Youth career
- –2014: FC Callies
- 2014–2019: Chippa United

Senior career*
Years	Team	Apps	(Gls)
2019–2021	Chippa United	35	(0)
2021–2022	Cape Town Spurs	19	(1)
2022–	Moroka Swallows	27	(2)
- * Club domestic league appearances and goals as of 16:34, 4 July 2024 (UTC)

Gregory Damons (born 13 June 1995) is a South African soccer player who plays as a defender for South African Premier Division side Moroka Swallows.

== Early and personal life ==
Damons was born in Gelvandale, Port Elizabeth as the younger of two children and attended Gelvandale High School and later Western Cape Sports School, having been awarded a scholarship there after playing in the Engen Knockout Challenge. After leaving school, he worked in the reception at St George's Hospital to pay for his transport fares to attend trials. He married Tiffany Gabriella in December 2020.

== Career ==
After playing for FC Callies in the SAFA Regional League, he joined the reserve team of Chippa United in 2014. In January 2018, Damons was promoted to Chippa United's senior team. Damons made his debut for the club on 14 August 2019 in a 1–1 draw with Mamelodi Sundowns; a performance for which he was awarded the Man of the Match award. Across the 2019–20 season, Damons made 21 league appearances for the club.
