= Frank Makua =

South African soccer player

Personal information
- Date of birth: 17 January 1974 (age 52)
- Place of birth: Pretoria, South Africa
- Position: Midfielder

Youth career
- John Celtic
- Ferro Metals

Senior career*
Years	Team	Apps	(Gls)
1995–2000	Kaizer Chiefs	91	(4)
2000–2002	Ria Stars	47	(7)
2002–2003	Dynamos	32	(8)
2003–2004	Supersport United	23	(1)
2004–2005	Manning Rangers	24	(0)
2005–2006	Dynamos	19	(1)
2006–2008	Witbank Spurs		

International career
2001–2003	South Africa	4	(0)
- * Club domestic league appearances and goals

Frank Makua (born 17 January 1974) is a South African former footballer who played at both professional and international levels as a midfielder. Makua last played club football for Witbank Spurs; he also earned four caps for the South African national side between 2001 and 2003.
