= Mario Booysen =

South African football defender

Personal information
- Full name: Mario John Booysen
- Date of birth: 15 August 1988 (age 38)
- Place of birth: Cape Town, South Africa
- Height: 1.91 m (6 ft 3 in)
- Position: Centre back

Youth career
- Bluegum United
- –2007: Ajax Cape Town

Senior career*
Years	Team	Apps	(Gls)
2007–2011	Ajax Cape Town	4	(1)
2008–2009	→ Bloemfontein Celtic (loan)	8	(0)
2009–2010	→ Maritzburg United (loan)	11	(1)
2010–2011	→ SuperSport United (loan)	17	(0)
2011–2012	SuperSport United	17	(0)
2012–2014	Maritzburg United	56	(6)
2014–2017	Mamelodi Sundowns	14	(0)
2016	→ SuperSport United (loan)	15	(1)
2016–2017	→ SuperSport United (loan)	13	(0)
2017–2018	Ajax Cape Town	17	(0)
2018–2019	Kaizer Chiefs	14	(0)
2019–2021	AmaZulu	26	(0)

International career^{‡}
2017	South Africa	7	(1)
- * Club domestic league appearances and goals as of 23 October 2022 ‡ National team caps and goals as of 23 October 2022

Mario Booysen (born 15 August 1988) is a South African professional soccer player who last played as a defender for Amazulu in the South African Premier Division.

== International career ==
Booysen was selected in the South Africa senior team preliminary squad for the 2016 CHAN qualifier against Angola on 17 October 2015.

== Personal life ==
His younger brother David Booysen is also a footballer.
