= James Kotei =

Ghanaian footballer (born 1993)

- Kotei with Simba in 2016

Personal information
- Full name: James Agyekum Kotei
- Date of birth: 10 August 1993 (age 33)
- Place of birth: Accra, Ghana
- Height: 1.80 m (5 ft 11 in)
- Position: Defensive midfielder

Youth career
- 2002–2007: Corner Babies
- 2007–2009: Golden Foot Academy

Senior career*
Years	Team	Apps	(Gls)
2010–2014	Liberty Professionals	65	(3)
2014–2015	→ BA Stars (loan)	25	(1)
2015–2016	Al-Orouba	8	(0)
2016–2019	Simba	75	(1)
2019	Kaizer Chiefs	0	(0)
2020	Slavia Mozyr	0	(0)
2021–2022	Sohar		
2022–2024	Mtibwa Sugar		
2024	Ittihad Shorta		
2024	Calicut		
- * Club domestic league appearances and goals

James Agyekum Kotei (born 10 August 1993) is a Ghanaian professional footballer who plays as a defensive midfielder.

== Career ==
=== Early career ===
Born and raised in Accra, Ghana. Kotei began his footballing career with Kumasi-based Corner Babies F.C. in 2002 when he was 9 years old. In 2007, he moved to Golden Foot Academy where he played as an academy player for the renowned Accra-based football academy until 2009.

=== Ghana ===
Kotei began his professional footballing career in 2010 with Dansoman-based club, Liberty Professionals F.C.

=== Oman ===
He first left Ghana in 2015, joining Oman Professional League club Al-Oruba SC. He made his debut for the club on 8 September 2015 in a 1–1 draw against Muscat Club in the 2015–16 Oman Professional League Cup. He made his league debut on 13 September 2015 in a 3–1 win over newly promoted side, Salalah SC. He also made his debut in the Sultan Qaboos Cup on 30 December 2015 in a 2–1 win over fierce rivals, Sur SC. He finished with 8 appearances in the 2015–16 Oman Professional League.

=== Tanzania ===
In December 2016, he moved out to Tanzania where on 13 December he signed a one-year contract with Tanzanian giants, Simba S.C. He made his Tanzanian Premier League debut on 18 December 2016 in a 2–0 win over Ndanda F.C. He made his CAF Confederation Cup debut on 11 February 2018 against Nationale De Djibouti He was adjudged the most valuable player in his side's 5–4 penalty win over rivals Young Africans S.C. in the Semi-finals of the Mapinduzi Cup of Tanzania on 10 January.

=== Kaizer Chiefs ===
In June 2019, Kotei signed for South African Premier Division side Kaizer Chiefs on a three-year contract. He was released by the club in January 2020, having failed to make an appearance for the club.

=== Slavia Mozyr ===
He signed for Belarusian club Slavia Mozyr in January 2020, before his contract was terminated in June 2020.

== Style of play ==
Kotei plays as a defensive midfielder.
