= Willard Katsande =

Zimbabwean footballer (born 1986)

Personal information
- Full name: Willard Katsande
- Date of birth: 15 January 1986 (age 40)
- Place of birth: Mutoko, Zimbabwe
- Height: 1.78 m (5 ft 10 in)
- Position: Central midfielder

Youth career
- –2002: Rail Stars Mutare

Senior career*
Years	Team	Apps	(Gls)
2002–2005	Frontier Steel	36	(56)
2006–2007	Feruka	30	(19)
2007–2009	Highway	60	(18)
2009–2010	Gunners	15	(8)
2010–2011	Ajax Cape Town	15	(2)
2011–2021	Kaizer Chiefs	326	(34)
2021–2022	Sekhukhune United	19	(1)

International career^{‡}
2009–2018	Zimbabwe	27	(3)

Managerial career
- 2026–: Rangers
- * Club domestic league appearances and goals as of 4 April 2024 ‡ National team caps and goals as of 4 April 2024

Willard Katsande (born 15 January 1986 in Mutoko) is a Zimbabwean retired professional footballer and coach, a former player of South African Premiership club Kaizer Chiefs and the Zimbabwe national team. He also played with Premiership sides Ajax Cape Town and Sekhukhune United.

== Club career ==
=== Early career ===
Known as a midfield work-horse, Willard Katsande began his career playing for local lower division clubs in Zimbabwe such as Frontier Steel (2002–2005), Feruka (2006–2007) and a popular giant killing club from Mutare, called Highway (2007–2009) from where he was recruited to play for Gunners F.C. in Harare for the 2009–10 season.

=== Gunners F.C. ===
At Gunners, Katsande made a huge contribution to the club's campaign in the CAF Champions League qualifiers. He was in irresistible form as the Gunners shocked African giants Al-Ahly 1–0 at Rufaro Stadium in the Champions League second round match before eventually bowing out on 2–1 aggregate, after losing the reverse encounter 2–0 in Cairo. The Gunners would however finish 1st in their league, clinching the title as Zimbabwean Premier League Champions for the 2009–10 season.

=== Ajax Cape Town ===
Willard Katsande made his professional debut for Ajax Cape Town on 12 December 2010 in a 2–0 win against Mpumalanga Black Aces at Atlantic Stadium in Witbank. He was acquired by Ajax Cape Town in the summer of 2010 as a transfer from Zimbabwean club Gunners F.C., having left a lasting impression on the club by his earlier performance with the Gunners in the CAF Champions League qualifiers.

=== Kaizer Chiefs ===
On 15 August 2011 Katsande joined Kaizer Chiefs, after Chiefs manager Bobby Motaung saw his performance while attending an international friendly match between Zimbabwe and Zambia. Katsande made his debut on 10 September 2011 in the MTN 8 final against Orlando Pirates coming in for Tshabalala in the 81st minute. In his first 12 league matches for Chiefs, Katsande got 5 yellow cards. Katsande won the Premier Soccer League and the Nedbank Cup in 2013 where he was the most booked player with 10 yellow cards including one red card. Katsande scored a long range scorcher after taking a few steps off the centre line in a 4–1 win over Bloemfontein Celtic on 21 July 2013 with his fellow countryman Knowledge Musona scoring on debut.

Katsande scored his first official goal on 15 March 2014 in the Soweto derby against Orlando Pirates, the same team he made his debut against, being a header in the 61st minute in a 1–0 win. He scored almost on the goal line and headed past Senzo Meyiwa. Katsande was the biggest winner at the Kaizer Chiefs Awards on 21 May 2014. He won Players' Player of the Season, May Player of the Month, Fan Player of the Season and Online Player of the Season and Player of the Season awards. He pocketed R230 000 in total prize-money after taking home most of the Awards. He scored his second official goal for Chiefs in a 2–1 win loss to Black Leopards in the Nedbank Cup on 21 March 2015, exactly 371 days after scoring his first. He won the MTN8 and his second league title in 2014–15.

== International career ==
Katsande was called up for national duty to represent Zimbabwe as of 2010, after his successful run with the Gunners, playing for the country's 2012 Africa Cup of Nations qualifying campaign.

== Career statistics ==
=== Club ===
As of 22 June 2016.

Statistics
Club	Season	League			National Cup (Note: Includes the Nedbank Cup)		League Cup (Note: Includes the Telkom Knockout)		Continental (Note: Includes the CAF Champions League and CAF Confederation Cup)		Other (Note: Includes the MTN 8)		Total	
Club	Season	Division	Apps	Goals	Apps	Goals	Apps	Goals	Apps	Goals	Apps	Goals	Apps	Goals
Kaizer Chiefs	2011–12	Premier Soccer League	12	0	2	0	0	0	—		1	0	15	0
Kaizer Chiefs	2012–13	Premier Soccer League	24	0	5	0	0	0	—		1	0	30	0
Kaizer Chiefs	2013–14	Premier Soccer League	28	1	3	0	3	0	0	0	3	0	37	1
Kaizer Chiefs	2014–15	Premier Soccer League	27	1	1	1	2	0	0	0	4	0	34	2
Kaizer Chiefs	2015–16	Premier Soccer League	27	7	1	0	3	0	0	0	4	0	35	7
Kaizer Chiefs	2016-17	Premier Soccer League	22	0	6	0	0	0	0	0	0	0	34	0
Kaizer Chiefs	Total		118	9	12	1	8	0	0	0	13	0	151	10
Career total			118	9	12	1	8	0	0	0	13	0	151	10

=== International ===
As of 18 November 2018.

National team	Year	Apps	Goals
Zimbabwe	2009	2	0
Zimbabwe	2010	1	0
Zimbabwe	2011	5	2
Zimbabwe	2012	3	0
Zimbabwe	2013	2	0
Zimbabwe	2014	2	1
Zimbabwe	2015	2	0
Zimbabwe	2016	5	0
Zimbabwe	2017	4	0
Zimbabwe	2018	1	0
Total		27	3

=== International goals ===
As of 22 June 2016. Scores and results list Zimbabwe's goal tally first.

Goal	Date	Venue	Opponent	Score	Result	Competition
1	10 August 2011	National Sports Stadium, Harare, Zimbabwe	Zambia	1–0	2–0	Friendly
2	1 June 2014	National Sports Stadium, Harare, Zimbabwe	Tanzania	2–2	2–2	2015 Africa Cup of Nations qualification

== Honours ==
Gunners

- Zimbabwe Premier Soccer League: 2009–10

Ajax Cape Town

- Telkom Knockout runner-up: 2010

Kaizer Chiefs

- Premiership: 2012–13, 2014–15
- Nedbank Cup: 2012–13
- MTN 8: 2014
