= Kabokweni Stadium =

Multi-use stadium in the Kabokweni, South Africa

- Interactive map of Kabokweni Stadium
- Location: Kabokweni, Nelspruit, Mpumalanga, South Africa
- Coordinates: 25.341°S 31.136°E
- Owner: Mbombela Municipality
- Capacity: 8,000

Construction
- Renovated: January–May 2010, (price: R 61-100 million)
- Project managers: IN & Associate Project Managers
- General contractor: Shuma Construction cc

Tenant
- TS Sporting F.C.

Kabokweni Stadium is a multi-use stadium in the Kabokweni village, situated next to Elijah Mango College around 4 km NorthEast of Kruger Airport, which is roughly 30 km NorthEast of Nelspruit, in the Mpumalanga province of South Africa. The stadium received a major upgrade in January–May 2010.

Currently, and throughout its previous history, the stadium is used mostly for local events and football matches. After being upgraded, it became the new official home venue of Sivutsa Stars F.C. in June 2010. This football club is based in Kabokweni, and will compete during the 2011–12 season at the second level of South African football, known as the National First Division.

== Upgrade ==
The stadium received a major upgrade in January–May 2010 at a total cost of 61-100 million Rand. A primary driving force for the upgrade, was that the local municipality wanted to construct a high quality training venue -with FIFA standard-, ahead of the 2010 FIFA World Cup. New capacity of the stadium was reported to be 8,000.

The upgrade included all in all: The construction of an access road, expansion and paving of the parking area, removal of lawn to install an artificial pitch, installation of new Apollo lights, upgrading of the ablution facilities, construction of a dressing room, construction of new stands for the crowds, construction of a borehole with tanks of a capacity of 50,000 litres, and the construction of a loading bay. Official opening and handover of the upgraded stadium, took place at 7 May 2010.
