= Tumelo Mangweni =

South African soccer player

Personal information
- Date of birth: 22 August 1994 (age 32)
- Position: Midfielder

Senior career*
Years	Team	Apps	(Gls)
2018–2021	Bloemfontein Celtic	18	(2)
2021	Royal AM	0	(0)
- * Club domestic league appearances and goals as of 13 November 2022

Tumelo Mangweni (born 22 August 1994) is a South African professional soccer player who played as a midfielder for Bloemfontein Celtic.
