= Highway F.C. =

Highway United
- Full name: Highway Football Club
- Nickname(s): Highway
- Ground: Hillcrest
Home colours

Highway F.C., Highway United Football Club (HUFC) is situated in the heart of Hillcrest, our home ground being at the William Gillitt Sports Complex, which in addition to football hosts Bowls, Tennis, Running and a social club. The grounds are owned by the Gillitt Family Trust and have been made available for the good of the community. The football Club has been growing from strength to strength over the past few years. The club relocated to the current grounds from our old home in Winston Park at Phipps Park. Currently, we boast a senior 1st team, a reserve senior team, an Over 35 team as well as junior age group teams from U6 to U13.The U11 1st have recently came 3 in last your season with most man of the match Wanga Zulu and the second team cam 6 with there top scorer Ndumiso Malunga number 9 2019

Highway are owned by Mutare businessman Binali Yard.
