= Lorenzo Gordinho =

South African footballer (born 1994)

Personal information
- Full name: Lorenzo Joao Gordinho
- Date of birth: 26 April 1994 (age 32)
- Place of birth: Benoni, South Africa
- Height: 1.84 m (6 ft 0 in)
- Position: Centre-back

Team information
- Current team: Cape Town City
- Number: 25

Youth career
- Kaizer Chiefs

Senior career*
Years	Team	Apps	(Gls)
2013–2020	Kaizer Chiefs	58	(7)
2018	→ Bloemfontein Celtic (loan)	27	(1)
2020	Bidvest Wits	14	(0)
2020–2022	Viborg	14	(1)
2022	HB Køge	13	(0)
2023–	Cape Town City	38	(2)

International career^{‡}
2017–	South Africa	3	(0)
- * Club domestic league appearances and goals as of 15 June 2024 ‡ National team caps and goals as of 7 July 2017

Lorenzo João Gordinho (born 26 April 1994) is a South African professional soccer player who plays as a centre-back for Cape Town City and the South Africa national team.

An academy graduate of Chiefs, Gordinho made his senior professional debut in 2013 and, either side of a year-long loan at Bloemfontein Celtic in 2018, represented the club on 71 occasions. Two years later, he joined fellow PSL side Bidvest Wits. He signed for Danish side Viborg FF in the summer of 2020

Gordinho is also a full international with South Africa, having made his senior debut in 2017, and has to date earned three caps with the national team.

== Club career ==
=== Early career ===
Gordinho is the son of former Orlando Pirates and Benoni United player, Manny Faria. In his early years, he and his brother Anthony played for Easterns in Benoni and later in Balfour, before being invited to train with Orlando Pirates’ development team. From there Gordinho was signed by Kazier Chiefs at the age of 15 after being put into contact with development coach, Lucky Stylianou by close friend Masalealo Seanego. His brother later trialled in Brazil before joining Ajax Cape Town's academy.

=== Kaizer Chiefs ===
Having progressed through the club's academy, Gordinho made his Kaizer Chiefs debut in the 2013–14 PSL season under coach Stuart Baxter. He made only two appearances across all competitions the following season as the club claimed a domestic double, winning the PSL and MTN 8 titles. Following Baxter's departure, and Steve Komphela's arrival in 2015, he was chosen to be part of the club's captains committee and became a regular within the starting line-up. He was voted PSL Player of the Month for August and September 2016. In January 2017, Gordinho was one of four Chiefs players who travelled to England to train with Fulham as part of a relationship-building exercise between the two clubs. Later that month, he was invited to trial with Danish Superliga side AaB and featured for the side in a friendly against Hoffenheim. A permanent move failed to materialize, however, and upon his return to South Africa he signed a new three-year contract with Chiefs. On 31 October 2017, he made his 50th league appearance for the club. It was his final appearance for Kaizer Chiefs for the season, however, and in January the following year he joined fellow PSL side Bloemfontein Celtic on loan.

==== Loan to Bloemfontein Celtic ====
On 3 January 2018, Gordinho signed for Bloemfontein Celtic on a one-year loan as part of a deal which saw Celtic captain Kabelo Mahlasela join Kaizer Chiefs permanently. He made his debut four days later when he started in a 2–1 league win over Golden Arrows and was well received by the club's supporters who were recorded chanting his name throughout the match. On 4 March, he earned the man of the match award for his performance in Celtic's 1–0 league win over Ajax. He scored his first goal for the club exactly one month later, netting in a 2–1 defeat to Orlando Pirates. He was also later sent off during the match for a professional foul on Luvuyo Memela. He ultimately made 16 appearances across all competitions in his debut season with the club. Ahead of the following season, he was reunited with Komphela after the manager had taken over the club following Veselin Jelušić's resignation and his own sacking by Chiefs earlier in the year. He made 14 appearances during the first half of the 2018–19 campaign before returning to Chiefs, despite Celtic attempting to retain his services for the remainder of the season.

=== Bidvest Wits ===
Following his return to Naturena, Gordinho managed just eight appearances over the course of the next year, before securing a permanent move to PSL rivals, Bidvest Wits on 14 January 2020, where he signed a two-and-a-half-year deal.

=== Viborg FF ===
After opting not to move to Tshakhuma Tsha Madzivhandila, who had purchased the top-flight status of Bidvest Wits, he signed a two-year contract with Danish side Viborg FF on a free transfer. As his contract came to an end in June 2022, Gordinho left the club after making a total of 15 appearances for Viborg since his arrival.

=== HB Køge ===
On 1 July 2022, Gordinho signed a 1,5-year deal with Danish 1st Division side HB Køge.

== International career ==
Though born in Benoni, South Africa, Gordinho was eligible to represent Portugal prior to making his international debut as his father is Portuguese.

=== South African national football team ===
In March 2017, Gordinho received his first call-up to the South African national side by interim-coach Owen Da Gama before making his debut under Stuart Baxter in a 2–1 friendly loss to Zambia in June.

== Career statistics ==
=== Club ===
As of match played 14 January 2020

Appearances and goals by club, season and competition
Club	Season	League			Cup^{1}		League Cup^{2}		Continental^{3}		Other^{4}		Total	
Club	Season	Division	Apps	Goals	Apps	Goals	Apps	Goals	Apps	Goals	Apps	Goals	Apps	Goals
Kaizer Chiefs	2013–14	PSL	2	0	1	0	1	0	0	0	0	0	4	0
Kaizer Chiefs	2014–15	PSL	1	0	1	0	0	0	0	0	0	0	2	0
Kaizer Chiefs	2015–16	PSL	16	3	0	0	2	0	0	0	2	0	20	3
Kaizer Chiefs	2016–17	PSL	25	4	2	0	2	0	0	0	1	0	30	4
Kaizer Chiefs	2017–18	PSL	6	0	0	0	0	0	0	0	1	0	7	0
Kaizer Chiefs	2018–19	PSL	3	0	0	0	0	0	0	0	0	0	3	0
Kaizer Chiefs	2019–20	PSL	5	0	0	0	0	0	0	0	0	0	5	0
Kaizer Chiefs	Total		58	7	4	0	5	0	0	0	4	0	71	7
Bloem Celtic (loan)	2017–18	PSL	14	1	2	0	0	0	0	0	0	0	16	1
Bloem Celtic (loan)	2018–19	PSL	13	0	0	0	1	0	0	0	0	0	14	0
Bloem Celtic (loan)	Total		27	1	2	0	1	0	0	0	0	0	30	1
Bidvest Wits	2019–20	PSL	0	0	0	0	0	0	0	0	0	0	0	0
Career total			85	8	6	0	6	0	0	0	4	0	101	8

^{1} Includes Nedbank Cup matches.
^{2} Includes Telkom Knockout matches.
^{4} Includes MTN 8 matches.

=== International ===
As of 4 September 2017

National team	Year	Apps	Goals
South Africa	2017	3	0
Total		3	0

== Honours ==
=== Club ===
Kaizer Chiefs

- Premier Soccer League: 2014–15

Viborg

- Danish 1st Division: 2020–21

=== Individual ===
- PSL Player of the Month (2): August 2016; September 2016
