= Samir Nurković =

Serbian footballer

Personal information
- Full name: Samir Nurković
- Date of birth: 13 June 1992 (age 34)
- Place of birth: Tutin, FR Yugoslavia
- Height: 1.87 m (6 ft 2 in)
- Position: Forward

Team information
- Current team: Supersport United
- Number: 32

Youth career
- FK Tutin
- Partizan Belgrade
- Košice

Senior career*
Years	Team	Apps	(Gls)
2011–2015	Košice	8	(1)
2013	→ ViOn Zlaté Moravce (loan)	4	(1)
2014	→ Dunajská Streda (loan)	6	(0)
2014–2015	→ Slovan Duslo Šaľa (loan)	25	(11)
2016	Spartak Vráble		
2016	Pohronie	18	(9)
2017	ViOn Zlaté Moravce	8	(1)
2017	Pohronie	10	(4)
2018–2019	Komárno	41	(35)
2019–2022	Kaizer Chiefs	60	(34)
2022–2023	Royal AM	11	(2)
2023–2024	TS Galaxy	22	(8)
2024–	Supersport United	5	(1)
- * Club domestic league appearances and goals as of 14 February 2025

Samir Nurković (Serbian Cyrillic: Самир Нурковић, born 13 June 1992) is a Serbian football striker who is currently playing for South African Premiership club SuperSport United.

== Club career ==
Samir was born in Tutin, at the time part of the Federal Republic of Yugoslavia. Nurković finished his football formation in Slovakia with Košice, joining the club at the age of 18. He played mainly for the reserve squad.

=== MFK Košice ===
On 5 November 2011, Nurković made his Corgoň Liga debut with Košice against ViOn Zlaté Moravce, where he scored the third goal of the match in a 3–2 away loss.

=== Kaizer Chiefs ===
Having averaged just under a goal a game for KFC Komarno in the 2018/19 season, Nurković was going to sign for a European club ahead of the following season, but Kaizer Chiefs coach Ernst Middendorp spoke to him and convinced him to sign for Chiefs instead. Nurković went on to score 13 league goals during the 2019/20 season. This was the most by a Chiefs player since Knowledge Musona bagged 15 in the 2010–11 season.

=== Royal AM ===
Nurković joined Royal AM at the beginning of the 2022 season. His stay at the club was acrimonious, with the club terminating his contract in October 2022, claiming the player had only reported for duty once, before an unofficial game. FIFA ruled that the termination was unlawful, and Royal AM received a transfer ban effective 3 July 2023.

=== Ts Galaxy ===
In August 2023, TS Galaxy signed Nurković as a free agent.

=== SuperSport United F.C. ===
In November 2024, SuperSport United signed Samir Nurković on a free transfer. Nurković signed a one-and-a-half-year deal.
