= Siphosakhe Ntiya-Ntiya =

South African footballer (born 1996)

Personal information
- Date of birth: 6 October 1996 (age 30)
- Place of birth: Bizana, South Africa
- Position: Left-back

Youth career
- Barsenal
- 2013–2016: SuperSport United
- 2016–2018: Kaizer Chiefs

Senior career*
Years	Team	Apps	(Gls)
2018–2022	Kaizer Chiefs	44	(0)
2022–2024	Sekhukhune United	38	(1)
- * Club domestic league appearances and goals as of 12 October 2024

Siphosakhe Ntiya-Ntiya (born 6 October 1996) is a South African soccer player who last played for South African Premier Division club Sekhukhune United, as a left-back. He joined the Kaizer Chiefs's youth system in 2016 and made his debut for the club in January 2018.

== Career ==
=== Early career ===
He was born in Bizana in Eastern Cape, South Africa, but moved to Durban in the mid-2000s and played youth football with local team Barsenal. He was scouted by SuperSport United in 2013 and moved to Pretoria before joining Kaizer Chiefs in 2016.

=== Kaizer Chiefs ===
He was promoted to the first team of Kaizer Chiefs in January 2018. He made his debut for the club on 6 January 2018, starting in a 0–0 draw with SuperSport United. In response to his debut, manager Steve Komphela said "I think he did well‚ very calm on the ball‚ very intelligent. He chooses a better option in any scenario." He made two league appearances in total for Kaizer Chiefs in his debut season in senior football.

The 2018–19 season saw Ntiya-Ntiya play more regularly for Chiefs as he appeared in nineteen league games. After starting their first four league games in all competitions, Ntiya-Ntiya said "It’s a great feeling. The technical team and the players have all helped me settle."

In August 2019, he signed a three-year contract extension, keeping him at the club until summer 2023. His first appearance of the season came on 10 August 2019 in a 1–0 victory over Black Leopards, their second match of the season. In August 2019, Ntiya-Ntiya stated his ambition for Kaizer Chiefs, saying "I think Kaizer Chiefs and Kaizer Chiefs only will win the league. The ambition is to win the league." He made 16 appearances in the league across the 2019–20 season, as Chiefs finished second in the South African Premier Division, missing out on the title on the final day.

He was released by Sekhukhune United in the summer of 2024.

== Personal life ==
He studied Business Management at Boston City Campus and Business College.

== Style of play ==
Ntiya-Ntiya plays as a left-back.
