= Daniel Cardoso =

South African soccer player (born 1989)

Personal information
- Full name: Daniel Antonio Cardoso
- Date of birth: 6 October 1989 (age 37)
- Place of birth: Johannesburg, South Africa
- Height: 1.84 m (6 ft 0 in)
- Position: Defender

Team information
- Current team: Sekhukhune United
- Number: 4

Youth career
- Sporting FC
- Supersport United
- Robertsham Callies
- Wits University
- Jomo Cosmos
- Yebo Yes United
- Lusitano
- 2011–2012: Highlands Park

College career
Years	Team	Apps	(Gls)
- University of Pretoria
- Wits University

Senior career*
Years	Team	Apps	(Gls)
2012–2015	Free State Stars	57	(1)
2015–2022	Kaizer Chiefs	185	(12)
2022–	Sekhukhune United	87	(1)

International career^{‡}
2015–2019	South Africa	3	(0)
- * Club domestic league appearances and goals as of 4 January 2026 ‡ National team caps and goals as of 30 October 2022

Daniel Antonio Cardoso (born 6 October 1989) is a South African soccer player who plays as a defender for Sekhukhune United in the Premier Soccer League.

== Early life ==
Cardoso was born in Johannesburg. His father grew up in Portugal, while his mother is a native South African. Cardoso aspired to be a veterinarian, but dropped out of school in 2003 to pursue his soccer career. Despite earning R100,000 a month, he still advises people to embrace education.

== Club career ==
Cardoso made his professional debut for the Free State Stars on 11 August 2012 in a 2–0 holme win over the Bidvest Wits. Cardoso was made vice-captain in 2014. In July 2014, Cardoso suffered a shin injury which ruled him out for five months. Cardoso joined the Kaizer Chiefs on 31 May 2015. After spending 7 years with the Chiefs, Cardoso left on 1 June 2022 and became a free agent.

== International career ==
Cardoso made his international debut in a 3–1 win over Swaziland on 25 March 2015.
