= Eric Mathoho =

South African footballer (born 1990)

Personal information
- Full name: Mulomowandau Eric Mathoho
- Date of birth: 1 March 1990 (age 36)
- Place of birth: Tshiombo, Thohoyandou, Venda
- Height: 1.90 m (6 ft 3 in)
- Position: Centre-back

Youth career
- Tshiombo XI Securitas
- The Dolphins

Senior career*
Years	Team	Apps	(Gls)
2009–2012	Bloemfontein Celtic	56	(4)
2012–2023	Kaizer Chiefs	211	(19)

International career^{‡}
2011–	South Africa	37	(1)
2016	South Africa Olympic	2	(0)
- * Club domestic league appearances and goals as of 9 May 2015 ‡ National team caps and goals as of 09:48, 4 October 2020 (UTC)

Eric "Tower" Mathoho (born 1 May 1990 in Thohoyandou) is a South African football central defender. He played for Kaizer Chiefs and South Africa.

== Early life ==
Mathoho was born in Tshiombo near Thohoyandou. He played soccer from a young age. He made balls out of onion bags and he played games in maize fields during harvest time and would tear off his toe nails when he kicked the ground and bruise his feet .

== Club career ==
=== Bloemfontein Celtic ===
Mathoho joined Bloemfontein Celtic from Limpopo-based Dolphins FC after going for trials with two other players in July 2009 under Owen da Gama. Mathoho made his debut on 3 February 2010 in a 0–0 draw against Mamelodi Sundowns under Clinton Larsen and was named Man of the Match. He scored his first goal on 27 February 2011 in a 5–0 win over Supersport United. He put on great performances in his first six months as a professional and was linked to Maccabi Haifa and went for trials at FC Twente but the €1 million deal never materialised. The deal collapsed because of financial laws in the Netherlands which insisted foreign players must get paid a significant amount – a law designed to control the quality of players brought into the country. Mathoho was set to be a replacement for Douglas who was leaving having been linked with Juventus and Bayern Munich but the deal collapsed.

=== Kaizer Chiefs ===
Mathoho joined Chiefs only in June 2012 after being linked with them since January and also Orlando Pirates and Mamelodi Sundowns and was unveiled on 1 July 2012. Mathoho made his debut on 5 August 2012 in a 4–1 loss to Mamelodi Sundowns where Chiefs were 4–0 down by the 36th minute. On 13 September 2012, Mathoho suffered a shoulder dislocation against Maritzburg United. On 3 April 2013, he scored his first goal in Chiefs colours against Maritzburg United in a 1–1 draw. He won the 2012/13 league title and the Nedbank Cup in his first season. Mathoho made his CAF Champions League debut on 1 March 2014 and scored against Liga Muculmana in a 4–0 win at Moses Mabhida Stadium on what was his 24th birthday. At the beginning of the 2014–15 season, Mathoho was part of a team that went 19 games without losing in the process, winning the MTN8 without conceding a goal and later won the league.

== International career ==
He made his debut for South Africa on 14 May 2011 versus Tanzania in an international friendly. Mathoho played every minute of South Africa's successful AFCON qualifying campaign in 2014 under Ephraim Mashaba to help them qualify for the first time since 2008.

== Style of play ==
Mathoho is a defender that also has the ability to launch attacks and go forward to add numbers and he is a threat in the air and at set-pieces.

== International career ==
=== International goals ===
Scores and results list South Africa's goal tally first.

Goal	Date	Venue	Opponent	Score	Result	Competition
1.	13 October 2015	Estadio Olímpico Metropolitano, San Pedro Sula, Honduras	Honduras	1–0	1–1	Friendly

== Honours ==
Kaizer Chiefs

- Premier Soccer League – 2013
- Nedbank Cup – 2013
- Carling Black Label Cup – 2013
- MTN 8 – 2014
- Premier soccer league - 2015
