= Dumisani Zuma =

South African footballer (born 1995)

Personal information
- Full name: Dumisani Percervearance Zuma
- Date of birth: 22 May 1995 (age 31)
- Place of birth: Pietermaritzburg, South Africa
- Height: 1.70 m (5 ft 7 in)
- Positions: Winger; striker

Team information
- Current team: Moroka Swallows

Youth career
- 42: Grange
- Maritzburg City
- 2010–2014: Kings United

Senior career*
Years	Team	Apps	(Gls)
2014–2017	Bloemfontein Celtic	57	(2)
2017–2022	Kaizer Chiefs	76	(10)
2022–2023	AmaZulu	19	(1)
2023–2024	Moroka Swallows	10	(0)

International career
- South Africa U20
2015	South Africa U23	3	(0)
2017	South Africa	3	(0)
- * Club domestic league appearances and goals as of 20 March 2024

Dumisani Percervearance Zuma (born 22 May 1995) is a South African soccer player who plays as a midfielder. He previously played for Bloemfontein Celtic, Kaizer Chiefs, AmaZulu and Moroka Swallows as well as the South Africa national football team.

== Club career ==
=== Early career ===
Born in Pietermaritzburg, Zuma started his youth career at the age of 11 with amateur side Grange and played for Maritzburg City before moving to Kings United in 2010.

=== Bloemfontein Celtic ===
At the beginning of the 2014–15 season, Zuma joined South African Premier Division side Bloemfontein Celtic from Kings United. He impressed early on in his spell at Celtic, with manager Ernst Middendorp describing him as 'one of the best young talents he had ever seen'. His first season at the club saw him make twenty league appearances, scoring once. He appeared 18 times in the league for the club across the 2015–16 season, scoring once, before appearing 19 times without scoring in the league across the 2016–17 season.

=== Kaizer Chiefs ===
In July 2017, Zuma signed for fellow South African Premier Division side Kaizer Chiefs on a three-year contract. His first goal for the club came on his 11th appearance for the club on 16 December 2017 in a 1–0 victory over Ajax Cape Town. In total, he scored 3 goals across 17 league appearances during the 2017–18 season. The 2018–19 season saw him score twice in 18 league appearances for Chiefs.

In September 2019, Zuma signed a new contract with Chiefs, lasting until July 2023. Zuma made his first start of the 2019–20 season on 6 November 2019, scoring a brace in a 2–0 victory against Chippa United with the first of his goals winning him the South African Premier Division Goal of the Month award for November 2019.

Zuma received several internal suspensions while playing for the Kaizer Chiefs, and was ultimately fired.

=== AmaZulu ===
He spent one season with AmaZulu, who opted not to prolong his one-year contract.

=== Moroka Swallows ===
He moved on to Moroka Swallows, but the club faced major internal problems with players leading a strike. Moroka Swallows forfeited two league games. In January 2024, over 20 players were fired, including Zuma.

== International career ==
Zuma has represented South Africa internationally at under-20 and under-23 levels. In July 2017, he earned his first senior cap for South Africa in a 1–0 African Nations Championship qualification victory over Botswana, before making a further two appearances for South Africa in August 2017.

== Style of play ==
Zuma is primarily a winger but can also play as a striker.

== Personal life ==
Zuma grew up supporting Kaizer Chiefs since the rest of his family also supported the club. His mother died in 2010 and his father died two years later in 2012.
