= Leonardo Castro (footballer, born 1989) =

Colombian footballer (born 1989)

Personal information
- Full name: David Leonardo Castro Cortés
- Date of birth: 12 May 1989 (age 37)
- Place of birth: Bogotá, Colombia
- Height: 1.83 m (6 ft 0 in)
- Position: Forward

Team information
- Current team: Greenville Triumph
- Number: 25

Youth career
- 2006–2007: Caterpillar Motor
- 2008: Millonarios

Senior career*
Years	Team	Apps	(Gls)
2008–2009	Millonarios	25	(3)
2010	La Equidad	34	(6)
2011–2012	Alianza Lima	5	(2)
2011	→ CNI (loan)	9	(3)
2012	→ Millonarios (loan)	1	(0)
2012–2013	Cúcuta Deportivo	26	(5)
2014	Águilas Doradas	15	(1)
2014–2015	Universitario de Sucre	16	(4)
2015–2018	Mamelodi Sundowns	39	(10)
2018–2022	Kaizer Chiefs	122	(27)
2023–	Greenville Triumph	83	(27)
- * Club domestic league appearances and goals as of 19:02, 31 October 2026 (UTC)

David Leonardo Castro Cortés (born 12 May 1989) is a Colombian footballer who plays as a forward for Greenville Triumph SC in the USL League One. He is also a youth soccer coach for Carolina Elite Soccer Academy.

Castro has played professionally for clubs in his native Colombia, as well as Peru, Bolivia, South Africa and the United States.

== Honours ==
Mamelodi Sundowns

- Nedbank Cup: 2014–15
- South African Premiership: 2015–16
- CAF Champions League: 2016
