= Sivutsa Stars F.C. =

- Full name: Sivutsa Stars Football Club
- Founded: 2009
- Dissolved: 2014
- Ground: Kabokweni Stadium, Kabokweni
- Capacity: 8,000
- League: National First Division
- 2013–14: National First Division, 13th
Home colours	Away colours

Sivutsa Stars was a South African football club based in Nelspruit, Mpumalanga that played in the National First Division.

Founded in 2009, Stars managed promotion to the National First Division in 2011 by finishing second at the Vodacom League play-offs.

== Achievements ==
- 2010–11 Vodacom League Mpumalanga champions

== Managers ==
- (South Africa) John Tlale (8 Aug 2013 – 13 Mar 2014)
- (South Africa) Duncan Lechesa (13 Mar 2014 – 2014)

== Disestablishment ==
Sivutsa Stars was bought out by Shauwn and Sbu Mpisane, who relocated the club to Durban and renamed it to Royal Eagles.

== Shirt sponsor & kit manufacturer ==
- Shirt sponsor: None
- Kit manufacturer: Kappa
