= Philani Zulu =

South African footballer

Personal information
- Full name: Philani Zulu
- Date of birth: 16 September 1992 (age 34)
- Place of birth: South Africa
- Position: Midfielder

Senior career*
Years	Team	Apps	(Gls)
2012–2017	Maritzburg Utd.	70	(3)
2017–2021	Kaizer Chiefs	43	(2)
2021–2022	AmaZulu	18	(0)
2022–2023	Sekhukhune Utd.	8	(0)
- * Club domestic league appearances and goals as of 27 November 2024

Philani Zulu (born 16 September 1992) is a South African footballer who last played for Sekhukhune Utd.
