= Bruce Bvuma =

South African soccer player

Personal information
- Date of birth: 15 May 1995 (age 31)
- Place of birth: Limpopo, South Africa
- Height: 1.81 m (5 ft 11 in)
- Position: Goalkeeper

Team information
- Current team: Kaizer Chiefs
- Number: 44

Senior career*
Years	Team	Apps	(Gls)
2017–	Kaizer Chiefs	51	(0)

International career
2017–	South Africa	3	(0)
- * Club domestic league appearances and goals as of 30 June 2024

Bruce Bvuma (born 15 May 1995) is a South African professional soccer player who plays for Kaizer Chiefs and the South Africa national team.
