= Daniel Akpeyi =

Nigerian footballer

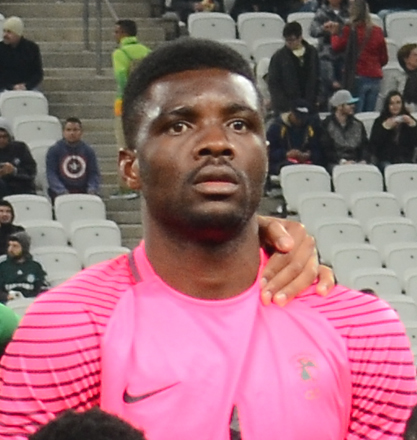
- Akpeyi at the 2016 Olympics

Personal information
- Date of birth: 3 August 1986 (age 40)
- Place of birth: Nnewi, Nigeria
- Height: 1.87 m (6 ft 2 in)
- Position: Goalkeeper

Youth career
- Gabros International

Senior career*
Years	Team	Apps	(Gls)
2005–2007	Gabros International		
2007–2010	Nasarawa United		
2010–2014	Heartland		
2014–2015	Warri Wolves		
2015–2019	Chippa United	92	(0)
2019–2022	Kaizer Chiefs	57	(0)
2022–2024	Moroka Swallows	35	(0)
2024–2025	Marumo Gallants	7	(0)

International career
2016	Nigeria Olympic (O.P.)	1	(0)
2015–2021	Nigeria	18	(0)
Medal record
Representing Nigeria
Olympic Games
Bronze medal – third place	2016 Rio de Janeiro	Team
Africa Cup of Nations
Third place	2019 Egypt
- * Club domestic league appearances and goals

Daniel Akpeyi (born 3 August 1986) is a Nigerian former professional footballer who played as a goalkeeper.

== Club career ==
Akpeyi joined Heartland F.C. for their 2010 CAF Champions League campaign, and was again first-choice. In February 2014, it was announced that he had left Heartland to join league rivals Warri Wolves, but a few days later, Heartland denied the move by an official statement, stating that they had no intention to sell their first choice goalkeeper.

In the following month, however, the deal was confirmed again and Akpeyi joined Warri Wolves.

In 2015, he signed a two-year deal with Chippa.

After speaking to Nigerian national team coach Gernot Rohr about Akpeyi's qualities, Kaizer Chiefs coach Ernst Middendorp saw to it that the Amakhosi management signed the Chippa United goalkeeper. Akpeyi went on to keep nine clean sheets in the league for Chiefs in the 2019/20 season. This remains the most clean sheets kept by a Chiefs goalkeeper in a league season since Itumeleng Khune kept 16 clean sheets in the 2017/18 league season. Akpeyi was also named Absa Premiership Player of the Month for September and October in 2019.

== International career ==
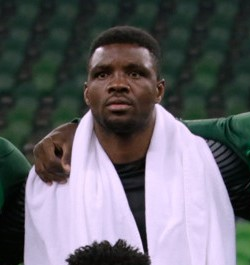
Akpeyi with Nigeria in 2017

Akpeyi was a member of the Nigeria national under-20 football team at 2005 FIFA World Youth Championship in Netherlands and was in the 22-man squad before the Beijing 2008 Summer Olympics, but did not see action in either tournament. He was also called up to the 23-man squad for the 2014 African Nations Championship as a backup to Chigozie Agbim.

On 6 May 2014, Akpeyi was named in the 30-man provisional squad ahead of 2014 FIFA World Cup.

He made his first full cap in 2015, called in for the friendly vs. South Africa as a replacement for an injured Vincent Enyeama. He saved a penalty and was lauded for his strong keeping in his Man of the Match performance.

He was selected by Nigeria for their 35-man provisional squad for the 2016 Summer Olympics.

In May 2018, he was named in Nigeria's preliminary 30-man squad for the 2018 FIFA World Cup in Russia before being selected for the final 23-man squad, becoming the only Premier Soccer League player to feature in the tournament.

Akpeyi was included in the team's final 23-man list to 2019 Africa Cup of Nations. He kept clean sheets in the team's first two matches. In the final group match Ikechukwu Ezenwa conceded twice in Nigeria's 2–0 defeat to Madagascar. Akpeyi returned to the starting line up in the round of 16 match against the indomitable lions of Cameroon where he conceded 2 goals in his teams 3 - 2 victory. He was also in goal in the team's Q. Final victory over South Africa and their 2 - 1 S. final lost to Algeria. Francis Uzoho was in goal for the third place match against Tunisia.

On 29 January 2020, Akpeyi prolonged his agreement with the South African Premier Soccer League by signing a two-year contract that will retain him with the Amakhosi until June 2022.

On 25 December 2021, he was selected by Nigeria interim coach Eguavoen as one of the 28-man squad final draft for the 2021 Africa Cup of Nations.

== Career statistics ==
=== International ===
As of match played 17 November 2019

Nigeria
Year	Apps	Goals
2015	1	0
2016	3	0
2017	3	0
2018	1	0
2019	10	0
Total	18	0

== Honours ==
- Nigerian FA Cup: 2011, 2012

Nigeria

- Summer Olympic Games bronze medal: 2016
- African Nations Cup bronze medal: 2019

Nigeria U20

- FIFA U-20 World Cup silver medal: 2005
