= Happy Mashiane =

South African footballer

Personal information
- Date of birth: 1 January 1998 (age 28)
- Place of birth: South Africa
- Height: 1.72 m (5 ft 8 in)
- Position: Midfielder

Team information
- Current team: Siwelele (loan)
- Number: 19

Senior career*
Years	Team	Apps	(Gls)
2019–	Kaizer Chiefs	53	(3)
2019–	→ Siwelele (loan)	1	(0)

International career^{‡}
2019	South Africa U23		
- * Club domestic league appearances and goals as of 4 January 2026 ‡ National team caps and goals as of 08:04, 16 February 2020 (UTC)

Happy Mashiane (born 1 January 1998) is a South African soccer player who plays as a midfielder for Siwelele, on loan from Kaizer Chiefs.
