= Teddy Akumu =

Kenyan footballer (born 1992)

Personal information
- Full name: Anthony Akumu Agai
- Date of birth: 20 October 1992 (age 34)
- Place of birth: Rachuonyo, Kenya
- Height: 1.84 m (6 ft 0 in)
- Position: Midfielder

Team information
- Current team: Nejmeh
- Number: 66

Senior career*
| Years | Team | Apps | (Gls) |
| 2010–2014 | Gor Mahia | 100 | (1) |
| 2014–2015 | Al Khartoum | | |
| 2016–2020 | ZESCO United | | |
| 2020–2022 | Kaizer Chiefs | 34 | (2) |
| 2023–2024 | Sagan Tosu | 0 | (0) |
| 2024–2025 | Kheybar Khorramabad | 8 | (0) |
| 2025– | Nejmeh | 20 | (1) |

International career^{‡}
| 2011– | Kenya | 47 | (0) |
- * Club domestic league appearances and goals as of 18:21, 9 July 2026 (UTC) ‡ National team caps and goals as of 18:13, 22 October 2023 (UTC)

Anthony "Teddy" Akumu Agai (born 20 October 1992) is a Kenyan professional footballer who plays as a midfielder for Lebanese Premier League club Nejmeh and the Kenya national team.

== Club career ==
Born in Rachuonyo, Akumu has played club football for Gor Mahia, Al Khartoum and ZESCO United. In January 2020, he moved to Kaizer Chiefs.

He was announced as the first foreign signing of J1 League club Sagan Tosu, joining the club for the 2023 season. After limited playing time, Akumu was released at the end of the 2023 season.

In July 2024, Akumu signed for Iranian club Kheybar Khorramabad.

On 30 August 2025, Akumu joined Nejmeh in the Lebanese Premier League.

== International career ==
He made his international debut for Kenya in 2011.

== Honours ==
Nejmeh

- Lebanese FA Cup: 2025–26
