= Ramahlwe Mphahlele =

South African soccer player

Personal information
- Full name: Ramahlwe Quinton Mphahlele
- Date of birth: 1 February 1990 (age 36)
- Place of birth: Ga Mphahlele, South Africa
- Height: 1.76 m (5 ft 9 1/2 in)
- Positions: Defender; midfielder

Team information
- Current team: AmaZulu
- Number: 23

Youth career
- Turfloop School of Excellence
- Moroka Swallows

Senior career*
Years	Team	Apps	(Gls)
2007–2011	Moroka Swallows	49	(0)
2011–2016	Mamelodi Sundowns	90	(1)
2012–2013	→ Pretoria University (loan)	15	(0)
2016–2022	Kaizer Chiefs	98	(4)
2022–	AmaZulu	49	(3)

International career^{‡}
2016–2019	South Africa	17	(0)
- * Club domestic league appearances and goals as of 1 August 2024 ‡ National team caps and goals as of 1 September 2023

Ramahlwe Mphahlele (born 1 February 1990) is a South African soccer player who plays as a defender and midfielder for Premier Soccer League club AmaZulu. He formerly played for Mamelodi Sundowns and Kaizer Chiefs.
