= Kearyn Baccus =

Australian soccer player

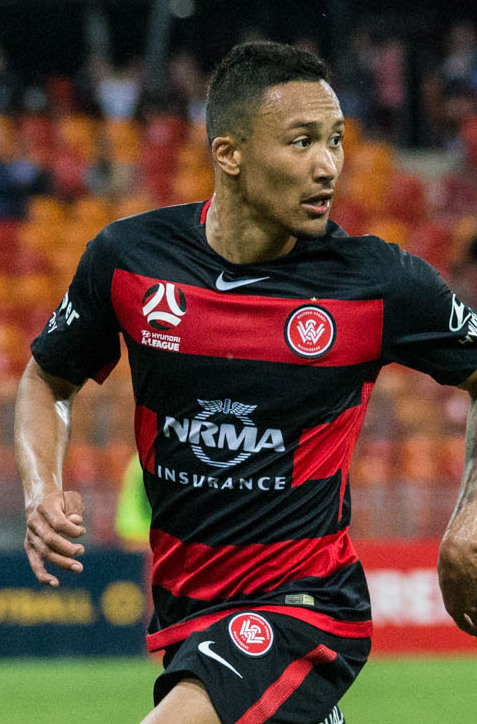
- Baccus playing for Western Sydney Wanderers in 2017

Personal information
- Full name: Kearyn Byron Baccus
- Date of birth: 5 September 1991 (age 35)
- Place of birth: Durban, South Africa
- Height: 1.80 m (5 ft 11 in)
- Positions: Central midfielder; defensive midfielder

Youth career
- 2008–2009: Sydney FC

Senior career*
Years	Team	Apps	(Gls)
2010–2012	Le Mans II	27	(2)
2012–2013	Perth Glory	0	(0)
2013–2014	Blacktown City	46	(10)
2014–2018	Western Sydney Wanderers	62	(0)
2018–2019	Melbourne City	27	(0)
2019–2022	Kaizer Chiefs	46	(2)
2022–2024	Macarthur FC	44	(1)

International career^{‡}
2009	Australia U17		
- * Club domestic league appearances and goals as of 3 June 2024 ‡ National team caps and goals as of 15 November 2014

Kearyn Byron Baccus (born 5 September 1991) is a former professional footballer who played as a central midfielder.

He started his senior career in France with Le Mans II before returning to Australia, where he had spells with Perth Glory and Blacktown City. He went on to play in the A-League Men for Western Sydney Wanderers, Melbourne City and Macarthur FC, making 133 league appearances across the three clubs. Between 2019 and 2022, he played in the South African Premiership with Kaizer Chiefs.

Born in South Africa, he represented Australia at youth level.

== Club career ==
Baccus joined the youth system of Sydney FC in 2008. In 2010, he moved to France to sign with Le Mans, where he featured for the club’s reserve team, Le Mans II. After two seasons, he returned to Australia and signed a short-term deal with A-League club Perth Glory ahead of a proposed move to Italian side Siena. Limited opportunities in Perth, coupled with injury problems, saw him leave the club in 2013 and return to Sydney, where he signed with Blacktown City.

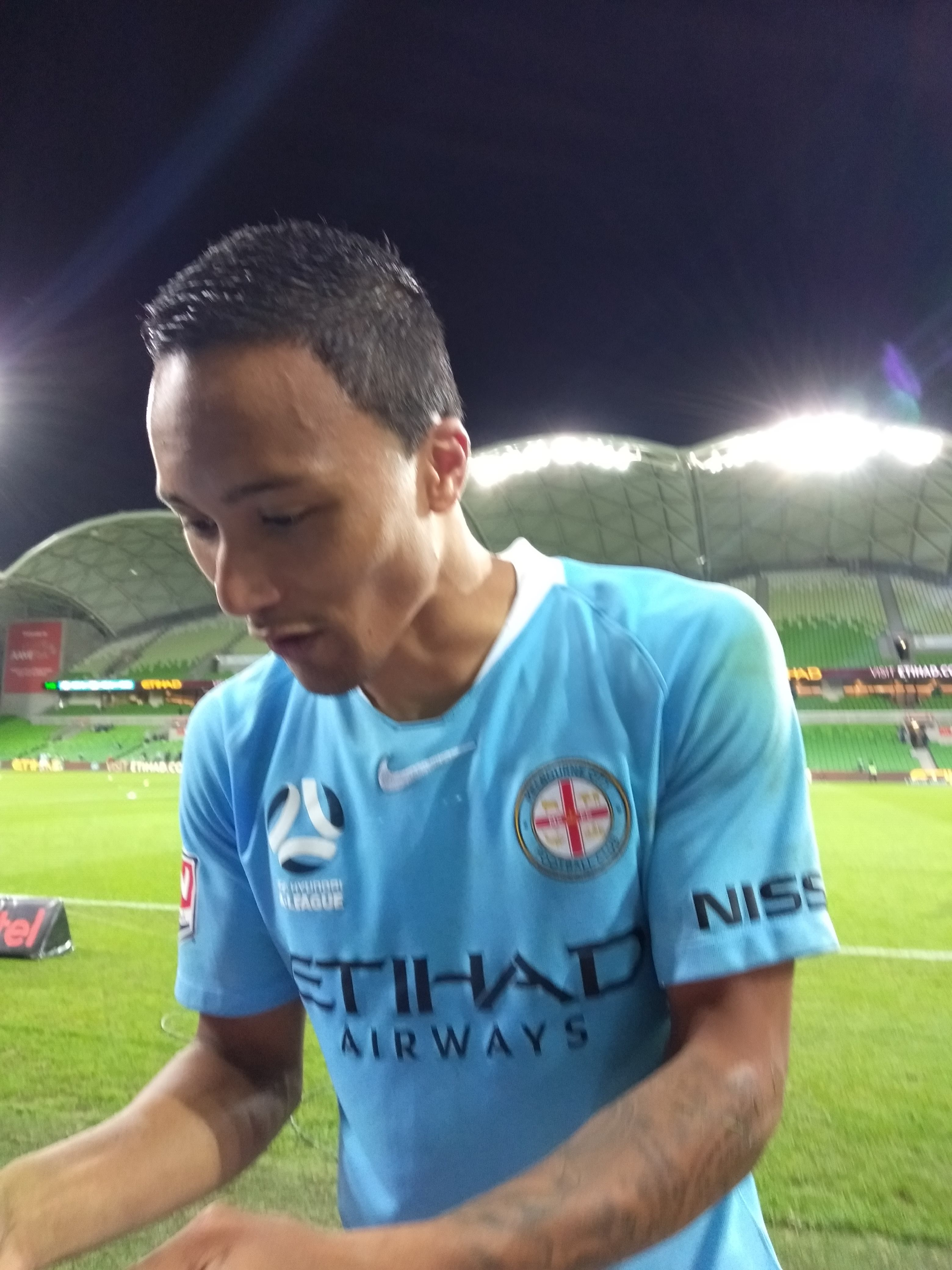
Kearyn Baccus with Melbourne City

On 6 November 2014, Baccus joined A-League side Western Sydney Wanderers on an injury-replacement contract. He was included in the squad for the 2015 AFC Champions League and went on to establish himself as a regular during the 2015–16 and 2016–17 A-League seasons. He left the club on 12 October 2018 after his contract was terminated by mutual consent.

Later that day, he signed with Melbourne City as an injury-replacement player. In January 2019, he signed a new three-and-a-half-year contract with the club.

On 5 July 2019, he joined South African Premiership side Kaizer Chiefs on a three-year contract, making 46 league appearances across three seasons.

On 6 July 2022, he returned to Australia, signing a two-year contract with A-League side Macarthur FC following his release from Kaizer Chiefs. He left the club upon the expiration of his contract on 30 June 2024.

== Personal life ==
Baccus was born in Durban, South Africa, and later moved to Sydney, Australia. He is the older brother of Keanu Baccus, who plays as a midfielder for Scottish Premiership side St Mirren.

Following the end of his playing career, he has been working as a truck driver.

== Betting scandal and sentencing ==
On 17 May 2024, Baccus and two of his Macarthur FC teammates were arrested and charged by the New South Wales Police Force in connection with alleged spot-fixing during the 2023–24 A-League Men season. Police alleged that club captain Ulises Dávila had received instructions from a South American associate to manipulate the number of yellow cards shown in four matches, and that he paid Baccus and another player A$10,000 each to participate in the scheme.

In September 2025, Baccus was sentenced in Sydney’s Downing Centre Local Court to a two-year conditional release order after pleading guilty to engaging in conduct that corrupts a betting outcome. The court heard that Baccus intentionally received a yellow card in one match as part of the scheme. He was also ordered to pay a A$10,000 pecuniary penalty and undergo treatment for gambling addiction.

During the sentencing, Baccus stated that he would never play football again.

== Honours ==
Macarthur

- Australia Cup: 2022
