= Kgotso Moleko =

South African soccer player

Personal information
- Date of birth: 27 August 1989 (age 37)
- Place of birth: Bloemfontein, South Africa
- Height: 1.81 m (5 ft 11 in)
- Position: Right-back

Youth career
- Deportivo La Coruna (South Africa)
- Liverpool (South Africa)
- Bloemfontein Celtic

Senior career*
Years	Team	Apps	(Gls)
2010–2012	Bloemfontein Celtic	41	(0)
2012–2021	Kaizer Chiefs	71	(1)
2021–2022	AmaZulu	9	(0)

International career^{‡}
2017	South Africa	1	(0)
- * Club domestic league appearances and goals as of 23 October 2022 ‡ National team caps and goals as of 23 October 2022

Kgotso Moleko (born 27 August 1989) is a South African professional soccer player who last played as a right-back for Amazulu in the South African Premier Division.
