= Kabokweni =

Kabokweni Ngodini
- Location within Mpumalanga Location within South Africa
- Coordinates: 25.337°S 31.135°E
- Country: South Africa
- Province: Mpumalanga
- District: Ehlanzeni
- Municipality: Mbombela

Area
  - Total: 8.24 km^{2} (3.18 sq mi)

Population (2011)
  - Total: 21,905
  - Density: 2,660/km^{2} (6,890/sq mi)

Racial makeup (2011)
  - Black African: 98.3%
  - Coloured: 1.1%
  - Indian/Asian: 0.2%
  - White: 0.1%
  - Other: 0.4%

First languages (2011)
  - Swazi: 82.2%
  - English: 3.8%
  - Tsonga: 3.4%
  - Zulu: 2.9%
  - Other: 7.8%
- Time zone: UTC+2 (SAST)
- PO box: 1245
- Area code: 013

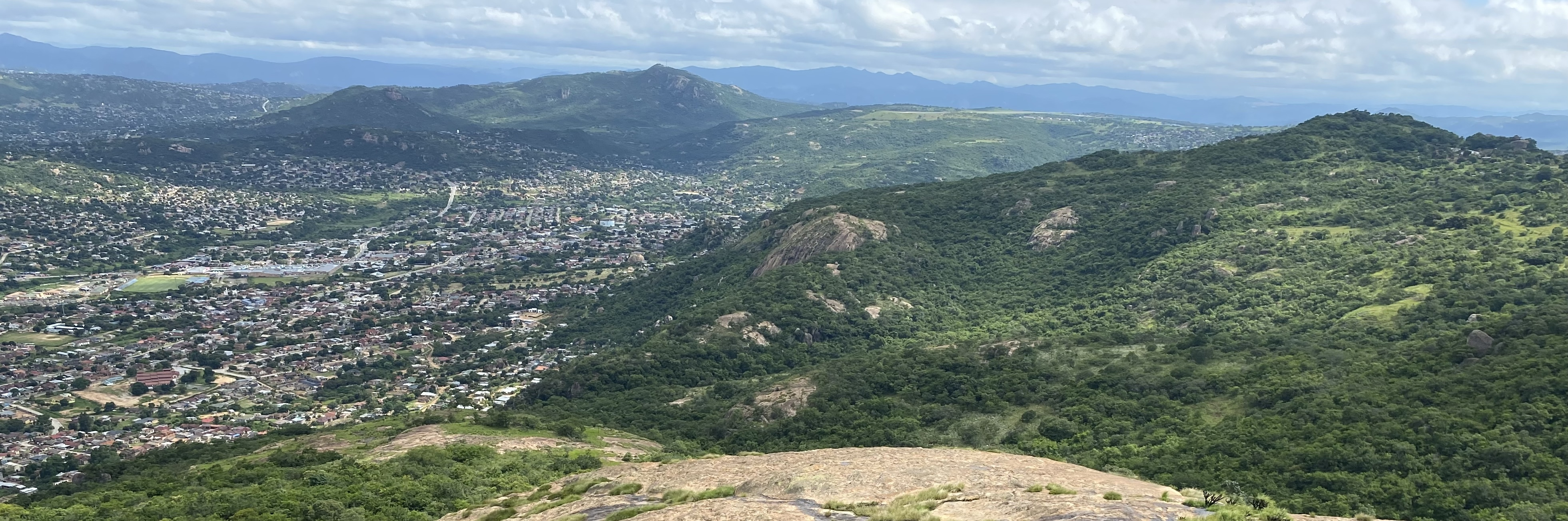
Kabokweni and the surrounding vegetation in 2025

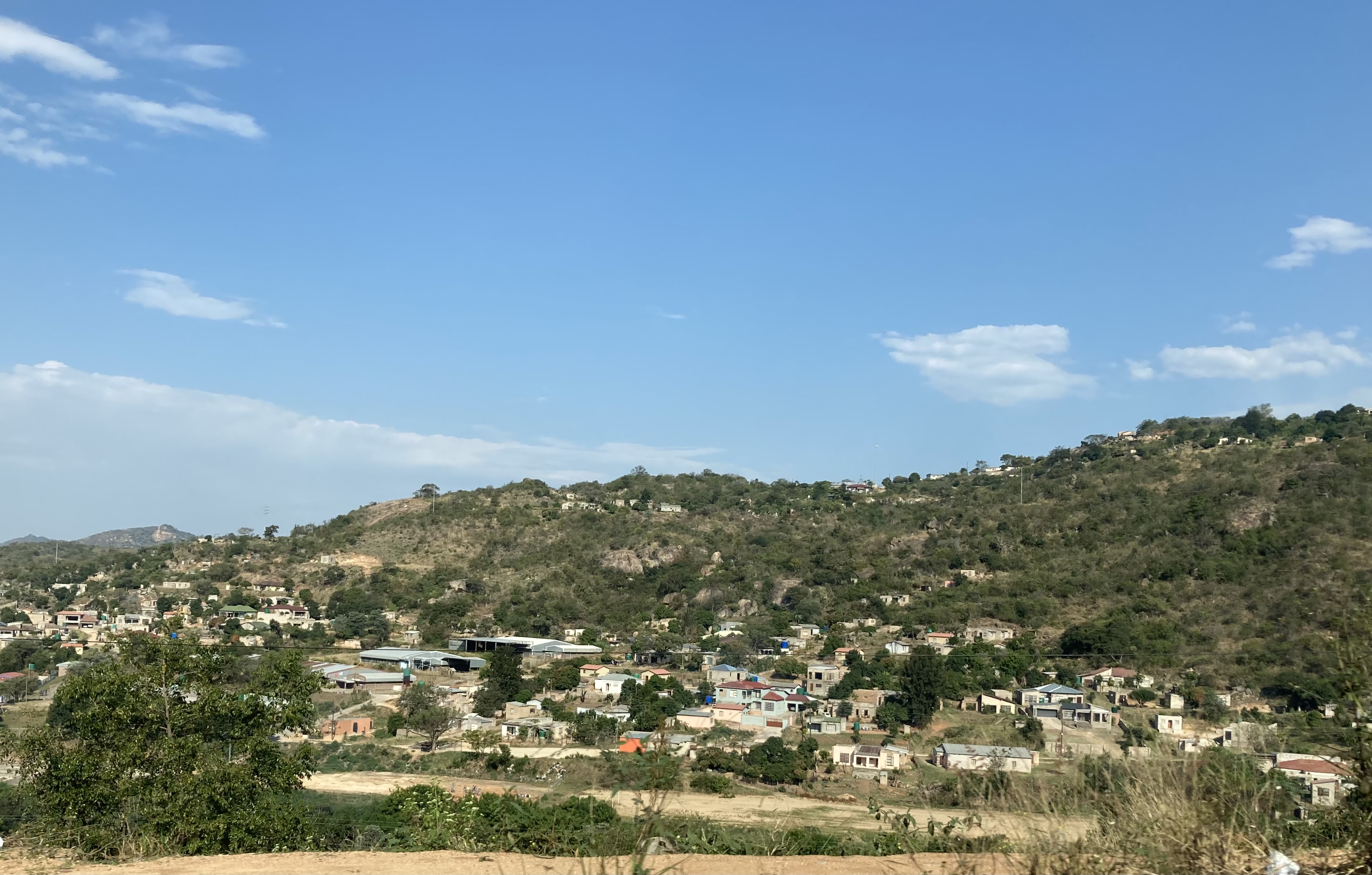
A residential area on the outskirts of Kabokweni, 2023

Kabokweni (also known as Ngodini) is a town in Ehlanzeni District Municipality in the Mpumalanga province of South Africa. Kabokweni was formally established in 1967 as the first residential township in the KaNgwane Bantustan. In 1968 the Bantu Affairs Department of the Apartheid state forcibly moved over 3000 people from the town of White River to Kabokweni. Today, it is a town of over 20 000 people.

== History ==
=== Archeology and early history ===
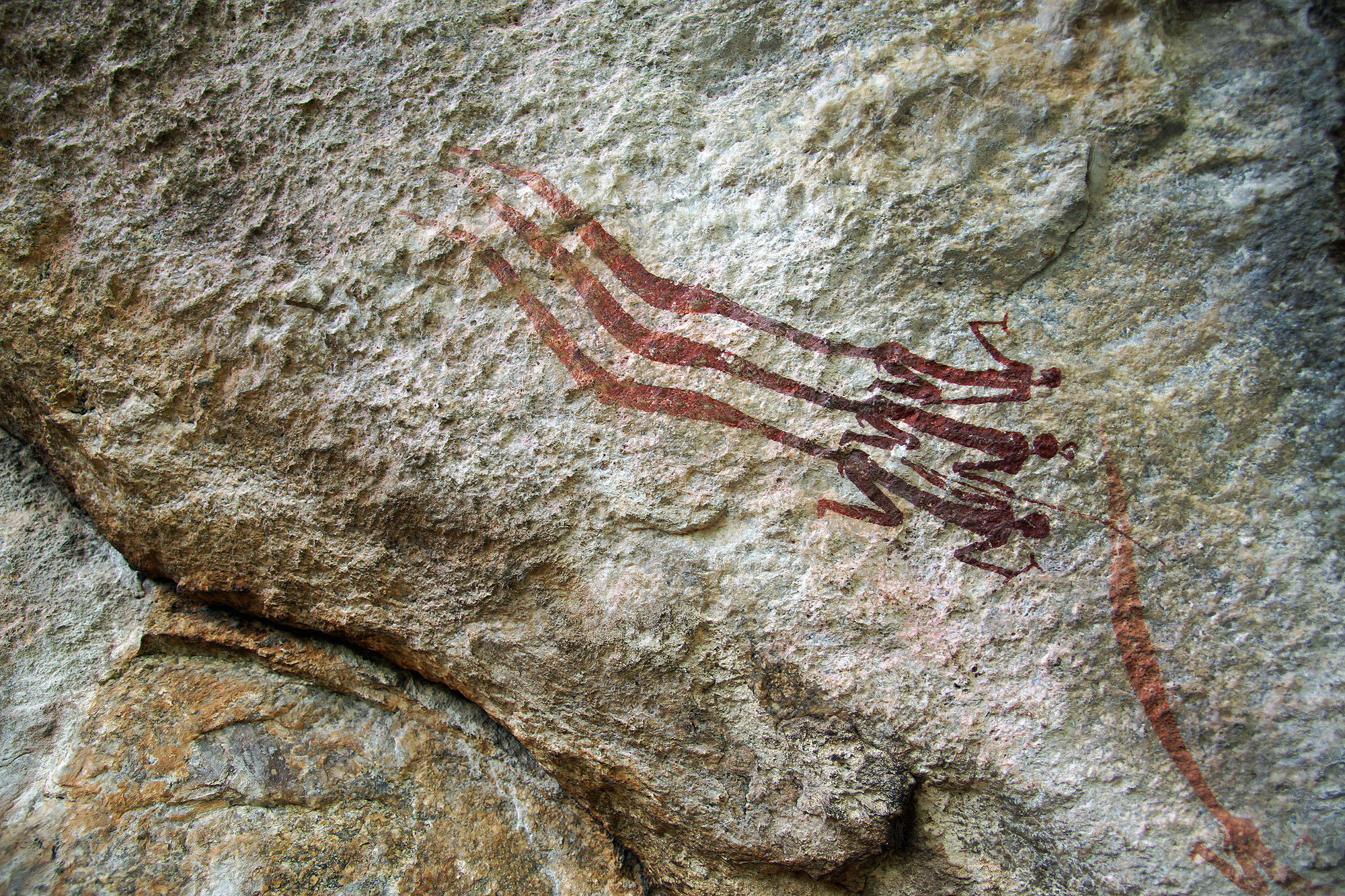
Rock paintings near Kabokweni

The archeological record indicates that the area sounding Kabokweni has a long history of human habitation. In surrounding areas, there are many Khoe-San rock art sites which give clues about the presence, lives and worldviews of the earliest hunter gatherers who lived in the region. After around 400 CE, there is evidence that communities who farmed crops, forged metal and kept livestock (while still hunting and gathering) were living in wider region. Archeological remains from a site in Plaston, not far west from Nsikazi indicate that people kept livestock in the area from at least as early as 660 CE and belonged to the same or similar culture to the people who created the Lydenburg Heads. The presence of livestock, farming and metal working suggests the presence of Bantu-speakers from this period onward. The earliest named groups of people present in the Nsikazi region, which Kabokweni lies in were the Pai, Mapulana, and Ngomane. By the early 19th century, these societies were bordered to the south by the Swazi, to the west by the Pedi and to the east and northeast Tsonga speakers. The people living in the area were impacted by the increase in trade, especially in ivory from Maputo Bay. In the early to mid-19th century, offshoot chieftaincies from the increasingly powerful Swazi Kingdom established a growing presence in the region.

=== Colonialism and apartheid ===
Before the 1960s, Kabokweni was known as Ngodini, meaning "the hole" in SiSwati in reference to the fact that it is under a watershed, some lay 1000 feet below the nearby town of White River. In 1936, Ngodini formally became part of the Nsikazi Native Reserve under the Native Trust and Land Act, 1936. The history of Kabokweni is closely connected to apartheid policies of forced removals. In preparation for the making of a residential township for people who would commute to work in White River and Nelspruit, the apartheid government forced existing residents off the land into centralized "betterment" villages in surrounding areas. In May and June 1968, as part of an aggressive national policy to create separate Black and White areas, apartheid's Bantu Affairs Department forcibly moved the over three thousand residents of White River's Black location to the recently built township of Kabokweni. According to the Surplus People Project, many people living in and around the Kabokweni area were forcibly moved up to three or more times. The name "Kabokweni" is the Siswati adaptation of Charles Borquin's surname, the Bantu Affairs Commissioner who was responsible for relocating people to the township from White River. Soon after the removals, Kabokweni's population was 3310. By 1977, it was 7917. In 1975, Kabokweni became part of the Swazi Territorial Authority, which later became known as KaNgwane, the apartheid Bantustan for Swazi people, although people of diverse ethnic, linguistic and cultural backgrounds lived in Kabokweni and nearby areas. In the 1980s, conditions in KaNgwane were harsh, with many reporting to the Surplus People Project the difficulties of life with access to little land, the loss of livestock, a scarcity of drinking water and other basic services, few opportunities and high levels of violence.

=== Student resistance and the Lowveld massacre ===
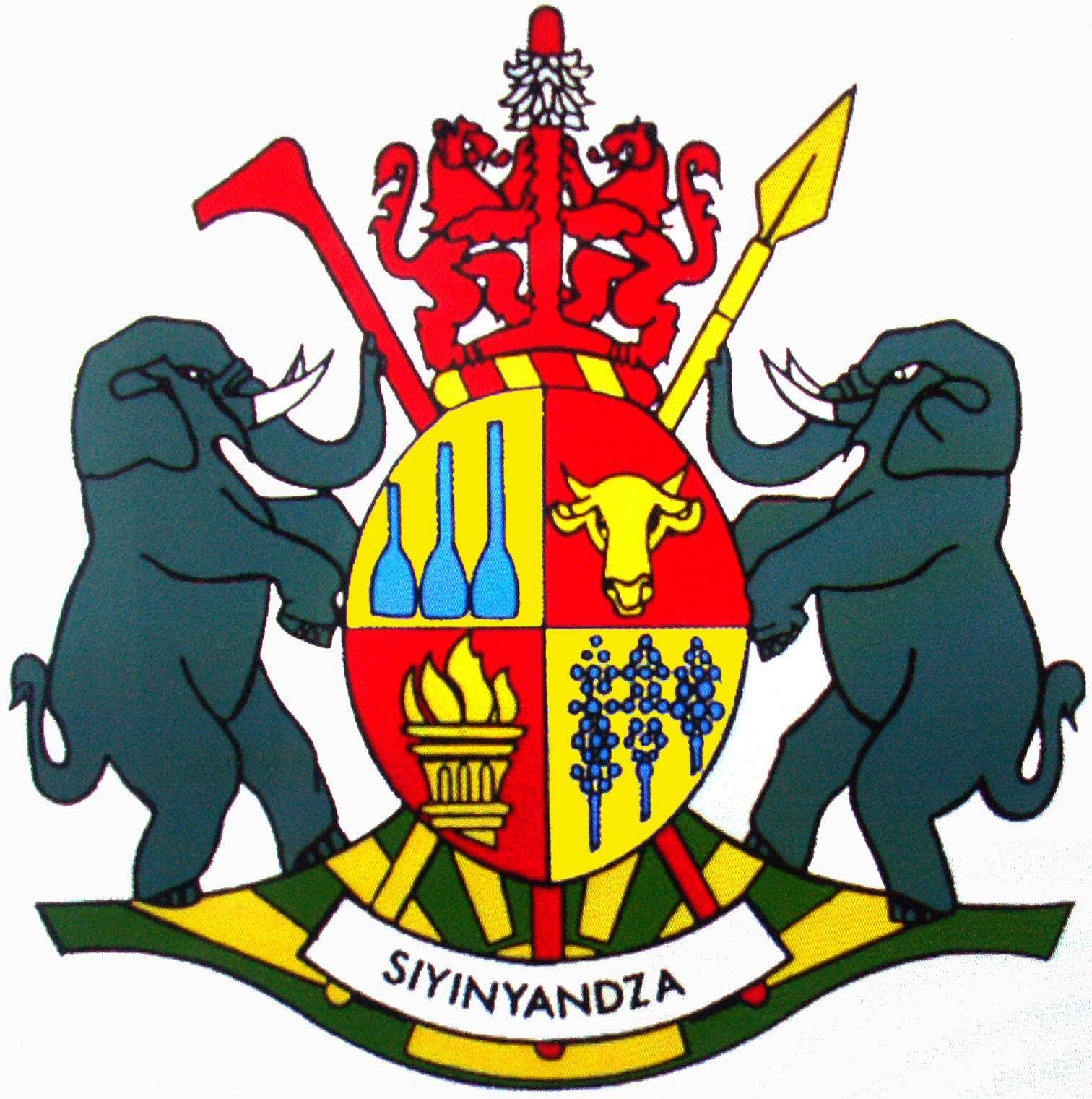
Kabokweni was one of the first residential townships in the KaNgwane Bantustan

Through various modes, many residents of Kabokweni resisted the violence, segregation and repression of the apartheid state. A strong student movement gained momentum in the 1980s, and in February 1986 students in Kabokweni led a school boycott and directed demonstrations of crowds as strong as 4,000 people against Bantu Education. Kabokweni was not spared from the most repressive of the apartheid state's violence.After the apartheid security police killed student Mandla Lekhuleni, protests grew more intense, and the police arrested a number of student protestors and placed them on trial at the Kabokweni Magistrate's Court. On 11 March 1986, a crowd of thousands of young people gathered at the Kabokweni Magistrate's office to demonstrate against the trial. As the crowd gathered, apartheid police forces opened fire on the protestors. Police shot 83 activists, mostly in the back, and arrested 50, many of whom the security police tortured.

=== Post apartheid ===
In the post-apartheid era, the population of Kabokweni has increased significantly and the physical footprint of the town has expanded outwards. The town has faced significant service delivery challenges, with extended, many months-long water outages forcing the Kabokweni community to rely on water purchased from water trucks and regularly turn to protest to make their grievances heard. An open fire from the police once took place in Bhuga Trust, a hometown situated around Kabokweni due to water-crises. Protestors were shot with rubber bullets during the night-time strike causing severe injuries to residents participating. Many people living in Kabokweni continue to commute to work in Mbombela and White River.

Today, Kabokweni falls under the Mbombela Local Municipality, within the wider Ehlanzeni District Municipality.

Kabokweni has 7 public schools and 2 private schools.

The Elijah Mango College of Higher Education, an institution established when Kabokweni was under KaNgwane, has become severely dilapidated, facing government neglect, and theft and vandalism in recent years. The local Mpumalanga Department of Agriculture, Rural Development, Land and Environmental Affairs has more recently promised to revive the facility.

== Donations ==
Neighboring towns situated around Kabokweni have been subjected to wildlife meat donation. Once a year, around November–December, Aggressive animals from Kruger national park are donated to towns as celebration to upcoming Christmas events. Some charity foundations donate food parcels to lower disadvantaged families. School students are given miniature food parcels as a Gift for December's time period. Money donations are denied by locals and elders due to bribery, corruption and dishonesty of services.

== Demographics ==
During the national census of 2011 the 8.24 km^{2} town housed an estimated 21,905 inhabitants, of which 98,3% were Black South Africans with 82% speaking siSwati as their home language.

== Health services in Kabokweni ==
There are private and public health services in Kabokweni.

Public facilities include:

key	Identified as:	Address
Major Hospital	Themba Hospital	1213 Kabokwweni Road
Public centre	Bhuga Community Health Centre	Gutjwa, Kabokweni, 1247
Public clinic	Gutjwa Clinic	N/a
Public clinic	Khumbula clinic	Stand No.1, Malekutu Trust, Khumbula village
Public clinic	Makoko Clinic	Makoko main road, Kabokweni
Public clinic	eMdlankhomo clinic	N/a
Public clinic	Zwelisha clinic	4545, Zwelisha Trust, Kabokweni, 1240

== Agriculture ==
Many local farmers rely on seasonal climate weather conditions to cultivate crop yield, mostly during the middle of summer. Some local residents establish their own garden basics to outline poverty around the area. A debate on whether commercial food marketing or local food marketing has occurred since post-apartheid. Local farmers believe that their food supply is 2 times cheaper than commercial food marketing and their opinion has been viewed as a fact since the increase of the inflation rate in 2022 by 2.43%. Few acres of land farms across Siligane have been primarily not focused upon due to water outages. This scenario decreases the economic wealth of the location.

== Activities ==
Sport is the most celebrated and attentive lifestyle choice for local residents. Soccer is the most played, viewed and watched activity across the whole district. Other activities such as Netball, Rugby, Tennis, Bush hunting, Swimming, Volleyball, Running, Cycling, Drag Racing, Hiking and Long jump are common in Kabokweni. Young kids are subjected to indigenous games, mostly girls. There's a count of more than 7 public sport fields, along with the fully functioning renovated stadium "Kabokweni Stadium". Athletes prefer afternoon sporting and training, because Afternoons have low weather conditions.

== Entertainment ==
Underground music has been a key product for some artist to make money in clubs as Dj's or Producers for Gqom, Amapiano, Deep House and Slow Jam. Modeling events are held every year in Kabokweni shopping centre around November to December with free entrance hosted by Kabokweni Plaza. Other plays of entertainment are Car Drifting shows that were lawfully stopped due to complaints of not binding to safety rules during this events. Plans to revive Car Drifting were taken into considerations, with new guidelines that ensure violence doesn't appeal on this events.

== Medicine ==
=== Clinical Services ===
Public clinics are the most essential services around kabokweni, with daily ratings of service rendered to sick patients. Public clinics are available 24/7 with minimum staff assistance during the night. Approval ratings have inclined and patients are satisfied with treatment plans.

=== Traditional medicine ===
Some households believe that nature plants can only heal natural organisms if grinded and properly mixed with other non-toxic plants. Stressed out civilians are given cannabis infused with other herbs to a drink called "IMBITA" during crises in order to avoid suicide ratings and this helps them increase their appetite. Some healers prefer taking individuals on a bush journey so that they can toughen their spriritualism and open their communication process with their Ancestors in terms of mental situations. Christians prefer water and fasting periods to heal patients, though this process takes much patience and time consuming, the results are way better than Sangoma's roots.

== Religion ==
Christianity is the dominating factor around Kabokweni with numerous Christian churches of more than 30. All churches around are usually community contributions for projects with no Loans granted from banks. On Friday's, Some believers attend whole night prayers, Some go out to camp uphill on mountains for worships and fasting. Others Host fun events at churches during Saturdays, whereby they invite Gospel singers and Pastors to preach the word of God. Jesus Christ is celebrated, as he represent a symbol of unity, trust and Faith around Kabokweni with a concept that claims that we are all Brothers and Sisters of this Nation.

== Road routing ==
The Kabokweni road is also commonly used when travelling to Kruger National Park. This main road links up-to 3 other main roads including the main entrance dust road leading to Siligane town. Pot-holes have been a dramatic issue to drivers and this increases local road labor for unemployed people trying to support the government in return for employment. The whole Kabokweni route consist of wooden shack markets for local farmers who sell fruits and vegetables. Few restaurants have been provisionally closed in response to water-crises.

== Schools ==
Notable schools:

No.	Primary school	status
1	Sandzile Primary school	Public
2	Mngwenyane Primary school	Public
3	Entokozweni Primary school	Public
4	Kidz Corner Academy	Private

No.	High school	status
1	Ngodini Secondary School	Public
2	Khutsalani Secondary School	Public
3	Vulindlela Secondary School	Public
4	The Oasis College	Private
5	Emntfonjeni	Public

== Notable people ==
- Robert Gumede

== Ecology ==
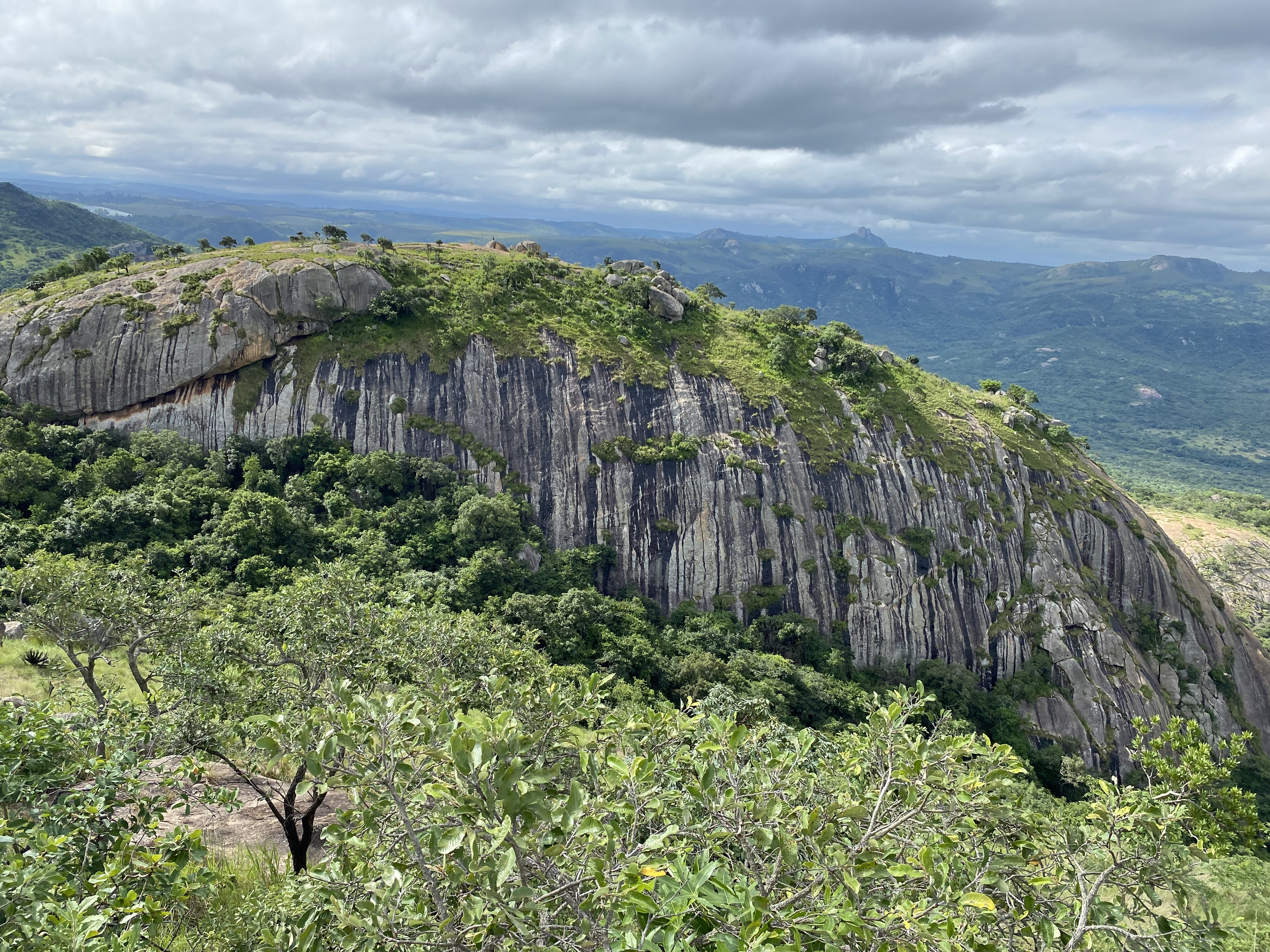
Granite whaleback on the outskirts of Kabokweni

Kabokweni's veld types are a combination of Legogote Sour Bushveld, Pretoriaskop Sour Bushveld and Crocodile Gorge Mountain Bushveld. The town is surrounded by granite boulders of the Nelspruit Granite group. It is within a summer rainfall region.

☀

== See also ==
- Lowveld Massacre
