= Thohoyandou Stadium =

Stadium in Thohoyandou, Limpopo, South Africa

Coordinates: 22°59′10.57″S 30°27′45.18″E

- Interactive map of Thohoyandou Stadium
- Full name: Thohoyandou Stadium

Construction
- Opened: 1994

Tenants
- Black Leopards (2014–present); Venda

Thohoyandou Stadium is a 20,000-capacity multi-purpose stadium in the town of Thohoyandou, in the province of Limpopo, South Africa. It is mostly used for soccer matches, and is the home stadium of Black Leopards and Venda football clubs. The stadium was also used by Tshakhuma Tsha Madzivhandila (TTM) before it was sold to a Gauteng- based businessman and moved home ground matches to Peter Mokaba Stadium.

It was not used for about 8 years until 2014 when Black Leopards started using it again as their home ground.
