= Yagan Sasman =

South African footballer

Personal information
- Date of birth: 10 July 1996 (age 30)
- Place of birth: Cape Town, South Africa
- Height: 1.82 m (6 ft 0 in)
- Position: Full-back

Team information
- Current team: AFC Eskilstuna
- Number: 28

Youth career
- –2016: Ajax Cape Town

Senior career*
Years	Team	Apps	(Gls)
2016–2019	Ajax Cape Town	42	(0)
2019–2021	Kaizer Chiefs	21	(0)
2021–2023	Swallows	43	(1)
2023–	AFC Eskilstuna	3	(0)
- * Club domestic league appearances and goals as of 15 November 2023

Yagan Sasman (born 10 July 1996) is a South African footballer who plays as a defender for the AFC Eskilstuna in Sweden.

== Career ==
A product of Ajax Cape Town's youth academy, Sasman made his league debut for the club on 4 March 2017, playing the entirety of a 0-0 draw with SuperSport United.

After the 2022–23 season, he moved to Europe and Swedish second-tier club AFC Eskilstuna.
