= PSL Awards =

South African football awards

The PSL awards is an awards evening held annually to honour South African football players, coaches and officials. It is conferred by the Premier Soccer League, with awards given to athletes from the Premiership and National First Division.

== Premiership ==
=== Premiership Footballer of the Season ===
The Premiership Footballer of the Season was inaugurated in 2008.

Year	Winner	Nominees		
2007–08	Teko Modise			
2008–09	Teko Modise (2)			
2009–10	Morgan Gould	Elias Pelembe	Katlego Mphela	
2010–11	Thulani Serero			
2011–12	Siyabonga Nomvethe	Siyabonga Sangweni	David Mathebula	
2012–13	Itumeleng Khune	Thuso Phala	Robert Ng’ambi	
2013–14	Sibusiso Vilakazi	Alje Schut	Willard Katsande	
2014–15	Tefu Mashamaite	Eric Mathoho	Cole Alexander	
2015–16	Khama Billiat	Keagan Dolly	Hlompho Kekana	
2016–17	Lebogang Manyama	Hlompho Kekana	Thulani Hlatshwayo	
2017–18	Percy Tau	Siphesihle Ndovu	Hlompho Kekana	
2018–19	Thembinkosi Lorch	Hlompho Kekana	Themba Zwane	
2019–20	Themba Zwane	Peter Shalulile	Samir Nurković	Gaston Sirino
2020–21	Peter Shalulile	Themba Zwane	Thabiso Kutumela	
2021–22	Peter Shalulile (2)	Victor Letsoalo	Andile Jali	
2022–23	Teboho Mokoena	Monnapule Saleng	Ronwen Williams	
2023–24	Ronwen Williams	Iqraam Rayners	Teboho Mokoena	
2024–25	Lucas Ribeiro Costa	Keletso Makgalwa	Relebohile Mofokeng	
2025–26	Relebohile Mofokeng	Oswin Appollis	Teboho Mokoena	

=== Chairman's Award ===
Year	Winner
2007–08	Musa Otieno
2018–19	Cedric Xulu
2022–23	Mamelodi Sundowns
2023–24	Mamelodi Sundowns
2024–25	Mamelodi Sundowns
2025–26	Jayden Adams

=== Assistant Referee of the season ===
Year	Winner	Nominees	
2010	Geronimo Piedt	Toko Malebo	Enoch Molefe
2008	Enock Molefe		
2022–23	Kamohelo Ramutsindela		
2023–24	Romario Phiri		
2024–25	Kgara Mokoena	Romario Phiri	Khamusi Razwimisani
2025–26	Nandipha Menze		

=== Player of the season ===
Year	Winner	Nominees	
2010	Daine Klate	Morgan Gould	Katlego Mphela
2008	Elias Pelembe		
2007	Godfrey Sapula		
2006	Surprise Moriri		

=== Premiership Midfielder of the Season ===
Year	Winner
2024–25	Makhehleni Makhaula
2025–26	Oswin Appollis

=== Premiership Defender of the Season ===
Year	Winner
2024–25	Nkosinathi Sibisi
2025–26	Lebone Seema

=== Young Player of the Season ===
Year	Winner	Nominees	
2009	Bongani Khumalo		
2010	Siyanda Xulu	Andile Jali	Thandani Ntshumayelo
2018	Siphesihle Ndlovu		
2019–20	Goodman Mosele		
2023–24	Relebohile Mofokeng		
2024–25	Relebohile Mofokeng	Malibongwe Khoza	Mohau Nkota
2025–26	Relebohile Mofokeng	Isaac Cisse	Seluleko Mahlambi

=== Goal of the season ===
Year	Winner	Nominees	
2008	Siboniso Gaxa		
2009	Ryan Botha		
2010	Rudolf Bester	Tlou Segolela	Vincent Kobola
2024–25	Lucas Ribeiro Costa	Fawaaz Basadien	Makabi Lilepo
2025–26	Cemran Dansin		

== Knockout League Cup ==
=== Player of the Tournament ===
Year	Winner	Nominees	
2010	Arthur Bartman	Mandla Masango	Dipsy Selolwane
2009	Franklin Cale		
2008	Itumeleng Khune		
2023	Devin Titus		
2024	Elvis Chipezeze	Edmore Chirambadare	Iqraam Rayners
2025	Mbekezeli Mbokazi	Ndabayithethwa Ndlondlo	Washington Arubi

== MTN8 ==
=== Player of the Tournament ===
Year	Winner	Nominees	
2009	Gert Schalkwyk		
2010	Njabulo Manqana	Dipsy Selolwane	Richard Henyekane
2022	Monnapule Saleng		
2023	Sipho Chaine		
2024	Relebohile Mofokeng	Fawaaz Basadien	Deon Hotto
2025	Tshepang Moremi	Kamogelo Sebelebele	Oswin Appollis

== National First Division ==
=== Top Goal scorer ===
Year	Winner	Club	Stream	Winner	Club	Stream
2010	Mulondo Sikwivhilu		Inland Stream	Tebogo Mashaba		Coastal Stream.
2008	Joseph Mthombeni	Dynamos	Inland Stream	Kurt Lentjies	Ikapa Sporting FC	Coastal Stream.
2023–24	Prince Nxumalo	JDR Stars				
2024–25	Muzomuhle Khanyi	Hungry Lions				
2025–26	Ntuthuko Mlotshwa	Lerumo Lions				
2025–26	Ronaldo Van Neel	Hungry Lions				

=== Player of the season ===
Year	Winner	Club	Stream	Winner	Club	Stream
2008	Reason Chiloane	Garankuwa United	Inland Stream	Fadlu Davids	Maritzburg United	Coastal Stream.
2024–25	Muzomuhle Khanyi	Hungry Lions				

=== Players' player of the season ===
Year	Winner	Club
2025–26	Emile Witbooi	Cape Town City

=== Young player of the season ===
Year	Winner	Club
2024–245	Teboho Lekhatla	Casric Stars
2025–26	Gabriel Amato	Cape Town City

=== Goalkeeper of the season ===
Year	Winner	Club
2024–25	Dumisani Msibi	Durban City
2025–26	Mickey van der Hart	Cape Town City

== Nedbank Cup ==
=== Player of the Tournament ===
Year	Winner	Club	Nominees	
2025–26	Darren Keet	Durban City	Siphamandla Ncanana	Brooklyn Poggenpoel
2024–25	Pule Mmodi	Kaizer Chiefs	Inacio Miguel	Gaston Sirino
2023–24	Patrick Maswanganyi	Orlando Pirates		
2022–23	Iqraam Rayners	Stellenbosch F.C.		
2022	Andile Jali	Mamelodi Sundowns		
2018	Lebohang Maboe	Maritzburg United		
2010	Matthew Pattison	Mamelodi Sundowns	Pere Ariweriyai	Patrick Phungwayo
2009	Mthokozisi Yende	Tuks F.C.		
2008	Vusiwe Masondo	Mpumalanga Black Aces		

=== Most Promising Player ===
Year	Winner	Nominees	
2025–26	Seluleko Mahlambi	Kyle Jurgens	Luphumlo Sifumba
2024–25	Mbekezeli Mbokazi	Relebohile Mofokeng	Mohau Nkota
2023–24	Relebohile Mofokeng		
2022–23	Olwethu Makhanya		
2018	Lebohang Maboe		
2010	Patrick Phungwayo	Simangaliso Biyela	Ndumiso Mabena
2009	Andile Jali		
2008	Thabang Rooi		
