= Devin Titus =

South African footballer (born 2000)

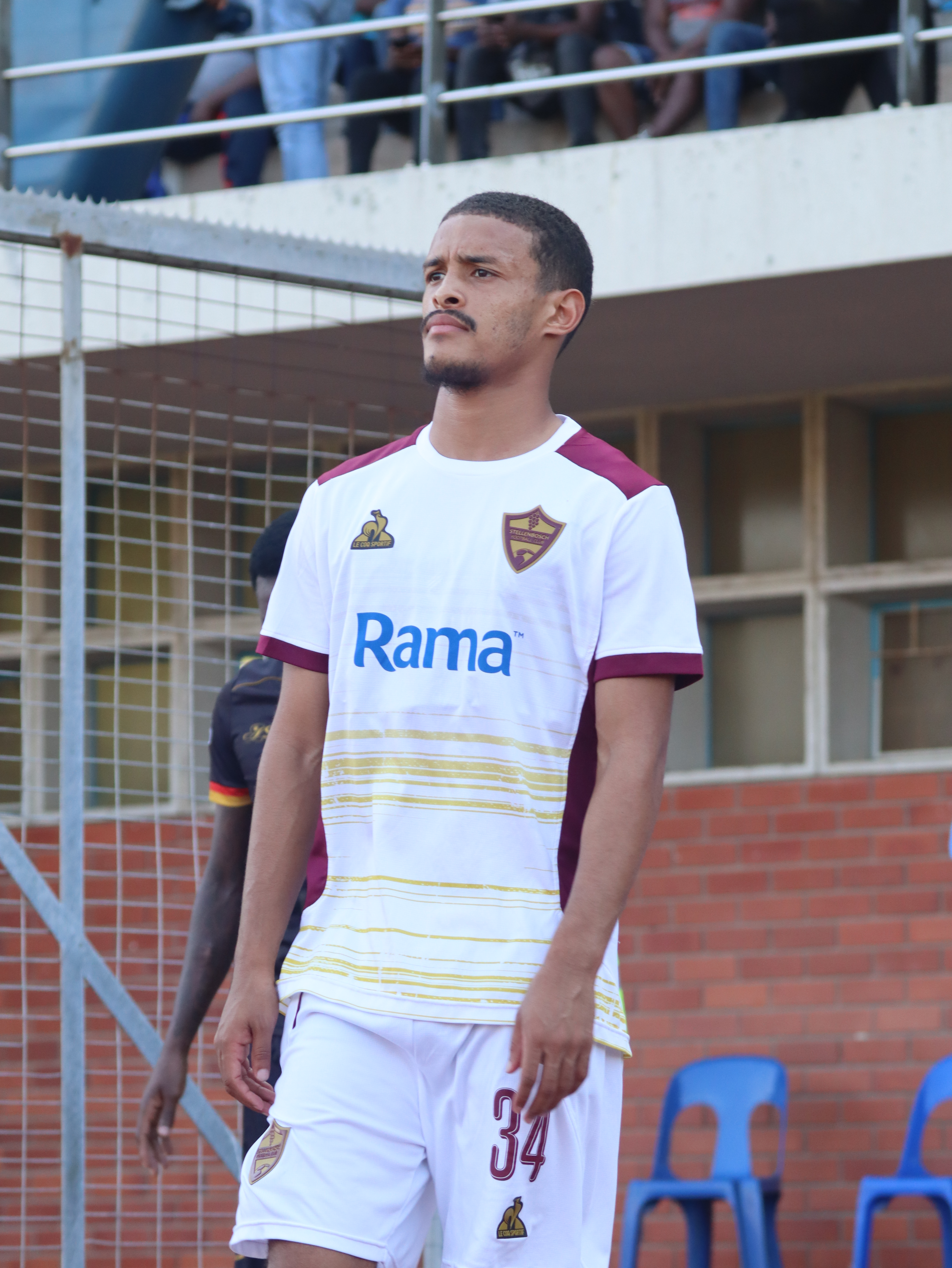
- Titus with Stellenbosch in April 2023

Personal information
- Full name: Devin Chandley Titus
- Date of birth: 18 May 2001 (age 25)
- Place of birth: Cape Town, South Africa
- Position: Forward

Team information
- Current team: Maghreb of Fez
- Number: 34

Youth career
- 2020-2022: Stellenbosch FC

Senior career*
Years	Team	Apps	(Gls)
2021–2026	Stellenbosch FC	126	(23)
2026–	Maghreb of Fez	4	(0)

International career^{‡}
2023	South Africa U23	1	(0)
2024	South Africa B	2	(0)
2024–	South Africa	1	(0)
- * Club domestic league appearances and goals as of 14:04 29 October 2026 (UTC) ‡ National team caps and goals as of 14:04, 29 October 2026 (UTC)

Devin Titus (born 18 May 2001) is a South African professional footballer who plays as a forward for Botola Pro side Maghreb of Fez and the South Africa national team.

Titus began his professional career with Stellenbosch FC where he progressed through the club's reserve ranks, captaining the team to the DStv Diski Challenge and Premier League Next Gen Cup titles, before being promoted to the first team. There, he became Stellenbosch's most-capped outfield player of all-time and in 2024, helped the club win its first top-flight trophy with a triumph in the Carling Knockout. His performances in the competition earned him the Player of the Tournament award. He also helped the team qualify for the CAF Confederation Cup for the first time, qualifying for back-to-back editions of the competition, before joining Maghreb of Fez in 2026.

== Club career ==
=== Stellenbosch FC ===
Born in Cape Town, South Africa, Titus' footballing career began at the age of six when he started playing for local amateur side Bishop Lavis, who at the time were coached by his father.

He later signed for professional side Stellenbosch FC where he initially joined the reserve team, who compete in the DStv Diski Challenge, and won the club's Diski Player of the Season award following the 2020-21 campaign. Mid-way through the same season, his form was recognised by head coach Steve Barker who handed him his senior debut in a 1-1 DStv Premiership draw against Black Leopards. The following season, Titus was named the reserve team's captain and he led the side to the league trophy, with his performances later seeing the reserves' No. 7 jersey temporarily retired by the players for the 2022-23 season in honour of his contributions. As a result of Stellenbosch's reserve league triumph, the club was also invited to take part in the 2022 Premier League Next Gen Cup in England where Titus scored two goals against Nottingham Forest in the semi-final before netting a first-half hat-trick in a 7–2 victory over Leicester City in the final.

In July 2023, he was rewarded with a first-team contract and permanently promoted to the senior side, where he went on to be an ever-present in the top-flight the following season, serving as the only player to feature in all 30 matches for the club in the domestic campaign. He also featured in four Nedbank Cup matches, scoring the opening goal in the 6–3 Round of 16 win over TS Galaxy, as Stellenbosch went on to reach the semi-final of the competition for the first time. The club ultimately failed to progress to the final but Titus was later nominated for the competition's Most Promising Player of the Tournament award.

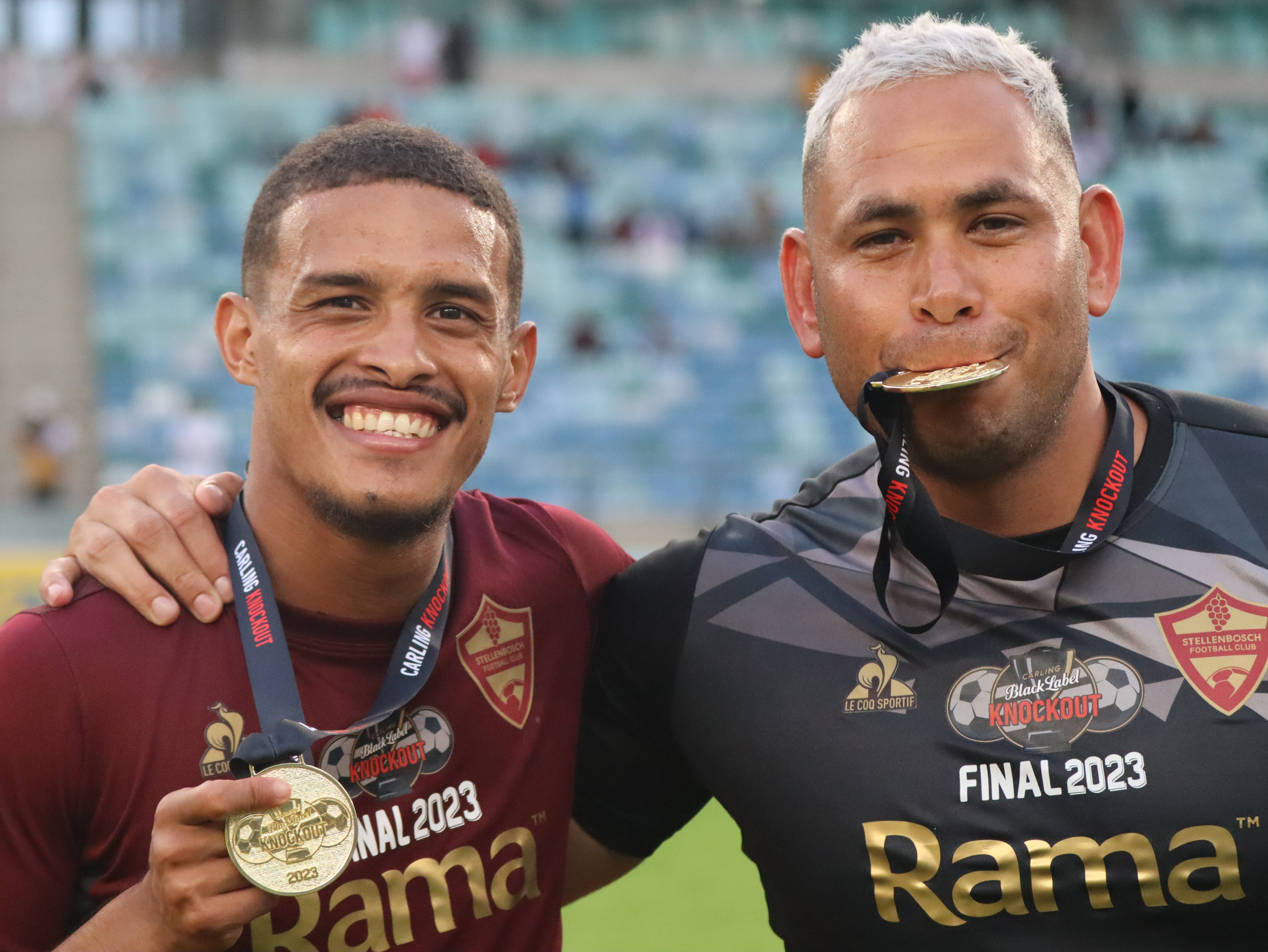
Devin Titus alongside captain Lee Langeveldt after winning the Carling Knockout Cup with Stellenbosch FC

The following season, Titus made his 50th appearance for Stellenbosch FC when he took to the field for the league match against Mamelodi Sundowns in September, becoming the fifth-youngest player from the club to reach the milestone. Later in the year, he helped the team win its first-ever Cup competition, featuring in all four matches, including the final against TS Galaxy, and scoring twice as Stellenbosch won the 2023 Carling Knockout Cup trophy. In April 2024, during a 4–0 Nedbank Cup quarter-final win over SuperSport United, he once again found the back of the net to record his 18th career goal for Stellenbosch. In doing so, he overtook former teammate Ashley Du Preez to climb to second place on the club's all-time goalscoring charts. His performances throughout the season saw him nominated for three accolades at the PSL Awards ceremony, including nominations for the DStv Premiership Midfielder of the Season and Carling Knockout Player of the Tournament, as well as a second consecutive nomination for the Nedbank Cup Most Promising Player award. He was ultimately named Carling Knockout Player of the Tournament, becoming the inaugural winner of the award, and also won Stellenbosch FC's Players' Player of the Season title as voted for by his teammates at the end of the campaign.

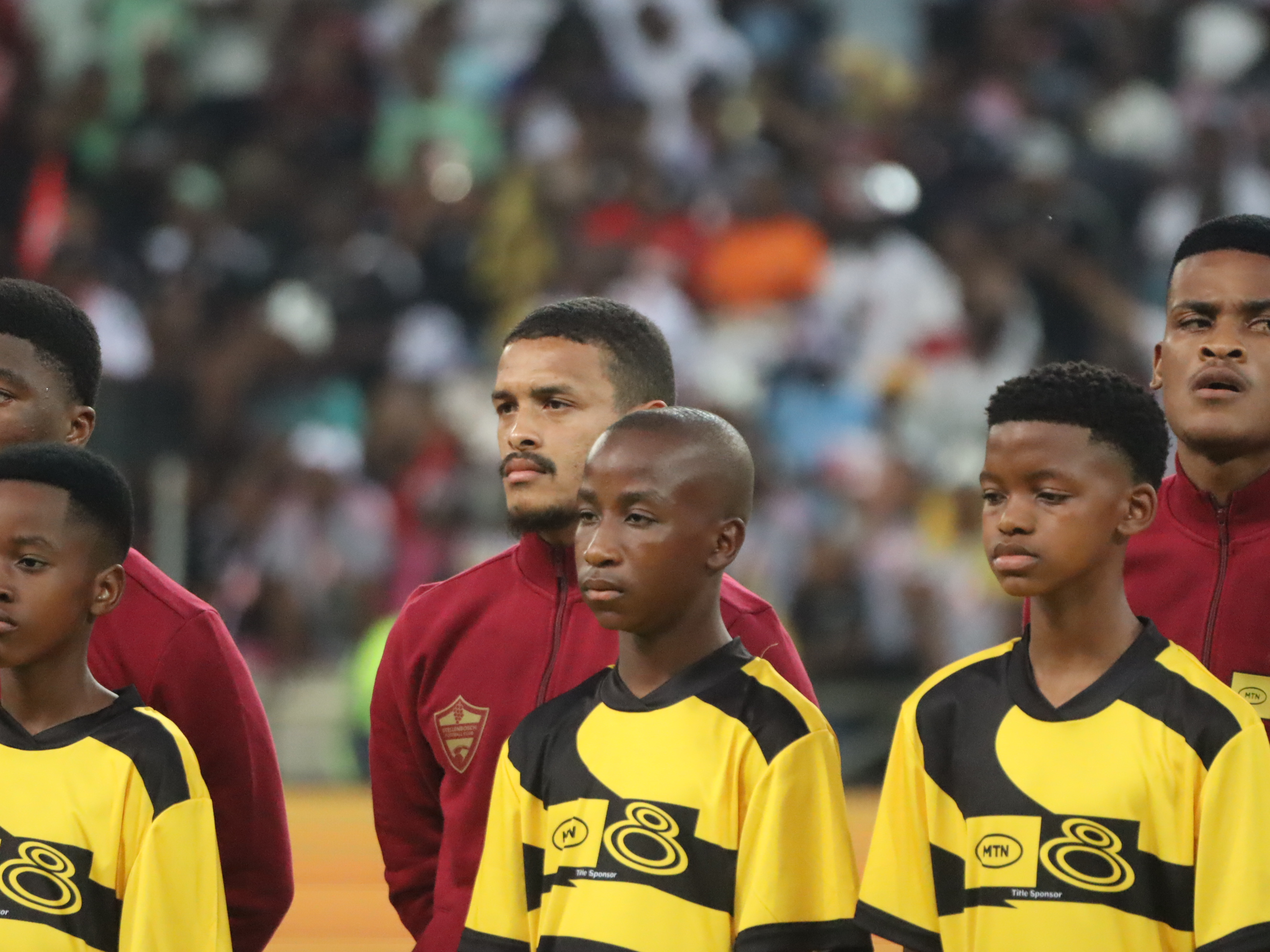
Devin Titus ahead of the 2025 MTN 8 Final against Orlando Pirates.

During the 2024–25 season, Titus was ever-present as Stellenbosch finished a club-record third in the Betway Premiership, were defeated finalists against Orlando Pirates in the MTN 8, and reached the semi-final of the CAF Confederation Cup in the team's first-ever continental campaign. Titus top-scored for Stellenbosch with 13 goals in 51 matches across all competitions from the right wing, including eight in the league, which was the third most behind the Mamelodi Sundowns pair of Lucas Ribeiro and Iqraam Rayners In the early stages of the following season, at the age of 24, and shortly after reaching a second consecutive MTN8 final, Titus became the youngest player to reach the milestone of 150 appearances for Stellenbosch when he started during the club's league fixture against Siwelele FC. Despite struggling for goals, Titus contributed creatively and ended the league campaign as the division's third leading assist-maker. He did, however, return to scoring ways in his final match of the club when, in the second fixture of the new season, he netted in a 3–3 draw against Polokwane City. Shortly thereafter, he completed a permanent transfer to reigning Moroccan Botola Pro champions Maghreb Fez after they triggered the buy-out clause in his contract, and departed as Stellies' most-capped outfield player of all-time with 176 appearances to his name.

=== Maghreb of Fez ===
In August 2026, Titus officially joined Botola Pro side Maghreb of Fez. He enjoyed a memorable debut the following month when he came off the bench to score a long-range goal in his side's 4–1 CAF Champions League preliminary-round first-leg win over Rahimo FC, in what was also his maiden appearance in the competition.

== International career ==
=== South Africa U-23 ===
Titus has represented South Africa at U-23 level and received his first call-up by coach David Notoane in March 2023 for the third round of 2023 U-23 Africa Cup of Nations qualifiers against Congo. He made his debut in a 1–1 home draw in the first leg but was ultimately unable to help his side qualify for the competition, which also served as the qualification route for the 2024 Summer Olympics.

=== South Africa B ===
Titus was called-up to the South Africa national soccer B team for the 2024 COSAFA Cup in Gqeberha, South Africa. He made his debut in the country's opening match of the tournament in a 1–1 draw against Mozambique and featured once more, although Bafana Bafana failed to progress beyond the group stage.

=== South Africa ===
His first appearance for the South Africa national team was during a 2025 Africa Cup of Nations qualification match against South Sudan which ended in a 3–0 win. The result saw Bafana Bafana qualify as group leaders with an unbeaten record. He was called up in the preliminary squad for the 2027 Africa Cup of Nations qualification matches against Kenya in 2026.

== Career statistics ==
=== Club ===
As of 29 October 2026

Appearances and goals by club, season, and competition
Club	Season	League			Cup^{1}		League Cup^{2}		Continental^{3}		Other^{4}		Total	
Club	Season	Division	Apps	Goals	Apps	Goals	Apps	Goals	Apps	Goals	Apps	Goals	Apps	Goals
Stellenbosch FC	2020–21	Premiership	1	0	0	0	–	–	–	–	–	–	1	0
Stellenbosch FC	2021–22	Premiership	6	0	0	0	–	–	–	–	–	–	6	0
Stellenbosch FC	2022–23	Premiership	30	6	4	1	–	–	–	–	–	–	34	7
Stellenbosch FC	2023–24	Premiership	29	7	4	3	4	2	–	–	2	0	39	12
Stellenbosch FC	2024–25	Premiership	28	8	3	2	2	1	14	2	4	0	51	13
Stellenbosch FC	2025–26	Premiership	30	1	2	1	2	0	5	0	4	1	43	3
Stellenbosch FC	2026–26	Premiership	2	1	0	0	0	0	–	–	–	–	2	1
Maghreb of Fez	2026–27	Botola Pro	4	0	0	0	0	0	1	1	–	–	1	1
Career total			130	23	13	7	8	3	20	3	10	1	180	37

^{1} Includes Nedbank Cup and Moroccan Throne Cup matches.
^{2} Includes Carling Knockout and Excellence Cup matches.
^{3} Includes CAF Confederations Cup and CAF Champions League matches.
^{4} Includes MTN 8 matches.

=== International ===
As of match played 19 November 2024

Appearances and goals by national team and year
National team	Year	Apps	Goals
South Africa	2024	1	0
Total		1	0

== Honours ==
Stellenbosch FC

- Carling Knockout Cup: 2023
- DStv Diski Challenge: 2021–22
- Premier League Next Gen Cup: 2022
- MTN 8 (runner-up): 2024 & 2025

Individual

- Carling Knockout Player of the Tournament: 2023–24
- Nedbank Cup Team of the Season: 2023–24
- Stellenbosch FC Golden Boot: 2024–25
- Stellenbosch FC Players' Player of the Season: 2023–24
- Stellenbosch FC Young Player of the Season: 2022–23
