= 2022–23 Nedbank Cup =

Tournament details
- Country: South Africa
- Dates: 7 February 2023 – 27 May 2023
- Teams: 32

Final positions
- Champions: Orlando Pirates

Tournament statistics
- Matches played: 31
- Goals scored: 104 (3.35 per match)
- Top goal scorer(s): Iqraam Rayners (6 goals); Kgomotso Mosadi (6 goals)
- All statistics correct as of 14 January 2023.

The 2022–23 Nedbank Cup was the 2022–23 edition of South Africa's premier knockout club football (soccer) competition, the Nedbank Cup. It was the 51st season of the competition, and 16th under its current sponsor.

Stellenbosch eliminated Defending champions Mamelodi Sundowns on the quarter final by 2 goals to 1. Orlando Pirates defeated Sekhukhune United in the final, with Sekhukhune automatically qualifying for the 2023–24 CAF Confederation Cup as a result of Pirates qualifying for the 2023–24 CAF Champions League.

== Participating teams ==
=== Teams ===
The following 32 teams took part in the competition.

| Number | Team | League |
|---|---|---|
| 1 | AmaZulu | South African Premier Division |
| 2 | Cape Town City | South African Premier Division |
| 3 | Chippa United | South African Premier Division |
| 4 | Kaizer Chiefs | South African Premier Division |
| 5 | Golden Arrows | South African Premier Division |
| 6 | Mamelodi Sundowns | South African Premier Division |
| 7 | Maritzburg United | South African Premier Division |
| 8 | Marumo Gallants | South African Premier Division |
| 9 | Orlando Pirates | South African Premier Division |
| 10 | Richards Bay | South African Premier Division |
| 11 | Royal AM | South African Premier Division |
| 12 | Sekhukhune United | South African Premier Division |
| 13 | Stellenbosch | South African Premier Division |
| 14 | Supersport United | South African Premier Division |
| 15 | Swallows | South African Premier Division |
| 16 | TS Galaxy | South African Premier Division |
| 17 | Cape Town All Stars | National First Division |
| 18 | Baroka | National First Division |
| 19 | Cape Town Spurs | National First Division |
| 20 | Casric Stars | National First Division |
| 21 | Magesi | National First Division |
| 22 | Polokwane City | National First Division |
| 23 | Pretoria Callies | National First Division |
| 24 | Venda Football Academy | National First Division |
| 25 | Amavarara F.C. (from Eastern Cape) | SAFA Second Division |
| 26 | Clarewood F.C. (from Western Cape) | SAFA Second Division |
| 27 | Dondol Stars F.C. (from Gauteng) | SAFA Second Division |
| 28 | F.C. Blackcross (from Free State) | SAFA Second Division |
| 29 | Liver Brothers F.C. (from Mpumalanga) | SAFA Second Division |
| 30 | Mkhambathi F.C. (from KwaZulu-Natal) | SAFA Second Division |
| 31 | Mpheni Home Defenders F.C. (from Limpopo) | SAFA Second Division |
| 32 | Tornado F.C. (from Northern Cape) | SAFA Second Division |

== Preliminary round ==
16 teams from SAFA Leagues (National First Division and SAFA Second Division) played the preliminary round to qualify for the Round of 32.

| 6 January 2023 | Cape Town All Stars | 7–1 | TTM | Gauteng |
| 15:30 SAST | Nyembe 3' (pen.), 10' (pen.), 63', 86'; Baloni 25'; Mphuthi 46'; Mofokeng 65' | | Netshilindi 21' | Stadium: Soshanguve Giant Stadium |

| 6 January 2023 | Cape Town Spurs | 1–0 (a.e.t.) | University of Pretoria | Cape Town |
| 15:30 SAST | Radiopane 112' | | | Stadium: Athlone Stadium |

| 6 January 2023 | MM Platinum | 0–1 | Magesi | Gauteng |
| 15:30 SAST | | | Wana 33' | Stadium: Bidvest Stadium |

| 7 January 2023 | Pretoria Callies | 1–0 | JDR Stars | Gauteng |
| 15:30 SAST | Mthembu 31' | | | Stadium: Lucas Masterpieces Moripe Stadium |

| 7 January 2023 | Black Leopards | 0–1 | Polokwane City | Limpopo |
| 15:30 SAST | | | Ramabu 50' | Stadium: Malamulele Stadium |

| 7 January 2023 | Hungry Lions | 1–1 (4–5 p) | Venda Football Academy | Windhoek Drought Park |
| 15:30 SAST | Muishond 10' | | Manzini 89' |

| 8 January 2022 | Uthongathi | 0–3 | Casric Stars | Princess Magogo Stadium |
| 15:30 SAST | | | Mosadi 18', 52', 66' |

| 8 January 2023 | Baroka | 4–1 | Platinum City Rovers | Global Stadium |
| 15:00 SAST | Bombi 48'; Ndlovu 94'; Gebhart 99'; Sithole 117' | | Malope 2' |

== Round of 32 ==
| 7 February 2023 | Marumo Gallants | 3–1 | Magesi | Rustenburg |
| 19:30 SAST | Koapeng 27' (pen.); Moseamedi 45'; Thangwane 45+1' | Report | Selemela 59' | Stadium: Royal Bafokeng Stadium |

| 7 February 2023 | Mamelodi Sundowns | 3–2 | Richards Bay | Pretoria |
| 19:30 SAST | Shalulile 11', 55'; Lebusa 46' | Report | Zungu 30'; Makateng 90' | Stadium: Loftus Versfeld Stadium; Referee: Jelly Chavani |

| 8 February 2023 | Supersport United | 1–2 | Dondol Stars | Pretoria |
| 19:30 SAST | Fox 18' (o.g.) | Report | Molefe 51'; Monama 76' | Stadium: Lucas Masterpieces Moripe Stadium |

| 8 February 2023 | Sekhukhune United | 6–0 | Liver Brothers | Polokwane |
| 19:30 SAST | Kabwe 13'; Cardoso 36'; Ohizu 53' (pen.); Mncube 80', 85'; Morris 90+2' | Report | | Stadium: Peter Mokaba Stadium |

| 10 February 2023 | Cape Town Spurs | 3–0 | Baroka | Cape Town |
| 15:00 SAST | Moosa 56'; Butsaka 88'; Ryan 90+3' | Report | | Stadium: Athlone Stadium |

| 10 February 2023 | Maritzburg United | 0–2 (a.e.t.) | Kaizer Chiefs | Petermaritzburg |
| 19:30 SAST | | Report | Saile 92'; Du Preez 113' | Stadium: Harry Gwala Stadium |

| 11 February 2023 | F.C. Black Cross | 1–2 | Venda Football Academy | Bloemfontein |
| 15:00 SAST | Thakho 47' | Report | Manzini 9', 67' | Stadium: Seisa Ramabodu Stadium |

| 11 February 2023 | Mpheni Home Defenders | 3–0 | Clarewood | Thohoyandou |
| 15:00 SAST | B. Makanya 43'; N. Shilenge 67'; N. Mavundla 86' | Report | | Stadium: Thohoyandou Stadium |

| 11 February 2023 | Stellenbosch | 3–0 | Swallows | Cape Town |
| 15:00 SAST | Sibiya 8'; Rayners 17', 58' | Report | | Stadium: Athlone Stadium |

| 11 February 2023 | Golden Arrows | 1–2 (a.e.t.) | Pretoria Callies | KwaMashu |
| 15:00 SAST | Mmodi 50'; Mutizwa 113' | Report | Dubula 15' (pen.) | Stadium: Princess Magogo Stadium |

| 11 February 2023 | Cape Town All Stars | 0–2 | Orlando Pirates | Johannesburg |
| 20:00 SAST | | Report | Saleng 62'; Lorch 70' | Stadium: Bidvest Stadium |

| 12 February 2023 | TS Galaxy | 2–0 | Amavarara | Johannesburg |
| 15:00 SAST | Mahlangu 41'; Phohlongo 45' | Report | | Stadium: Bidvest Stadium |

| 12 February 2023 | Mkhambathi | 0–4 | Casric Stars | Petermaritzburg |
| 15:00 SAST | | Report | Mosadi 9' (pen.), 30'; Abubakar 24'; Nkosi 50' | Stadium: Harry Gwala Stadium |

| 12 February 2023 | AmaZulu | 3–2 | Tornado | Durban |
| 15:00 SAST | Gumede 8'; Mhango 25'; Ntuli 63' | Report | Katz 78'; Dupane 79' | Stadium: King Zwelithini Stadium |

| 12 February 2023 | Cape Town City | 0–0 (3–4 p) | Royal AM | Cape Town |
| 18:00 SAST | | Report | | Stadium: Cape Town Stadium |

| 14 February 2023 | Polokwane City | 1–1 (1–3 p) | Chippa United | Polokwane |
| 19:30 SAST | Baloyi 3' | Report | Nikani 12' (o.g.) | Stadium: Old Peter Mokaba Stadium |

== Round of 16 ==
| 2 March 2023 | Marumo Gallants | 1–3 | Mamelodi Sundowns |
| | Pheko 33' | | Shalulile 8', 26', 74' |

| 8 March 2023 | Dondol Stars | 1–1 (5–4 p) | AmaZulu |
| | Fox 60' | Report | Ekstein 54' |
| | Penalties |
| | Monama (penalty scored); Baloyi (penalty scored); Nameka (penalty scored); Mnyembane (penalty scored); Mathiane (penalty scored) | | (penalty missed) Mhango; (penalty scored) Majoro; (penalty scored) Mobara; (penalty scored) Gumede; (penalty scored) Dion |

| 10 March 2023 | Sekhukhune United | 2–0 | Cape Town Spurs | Polokwane |
| | Letsoalo 23'; Kabwe 42' (pen.) | Report | | Stadium: Peter Mokaba Stadium |

| 11 March 2023 | Chippa United | 2–0 | Mpheni Home Defenders |
| | Pfumbidzai 31'; Appollis 70' | Report |

| 11 March 2023 | Golden Arrows | 1–3 (a.e.t.) | Royal AM |
| | Mutizwa 94' | | Nascimento 33'; Mashiane 110', 119' |

| 11 March 2023 | Orlando Pirates | 2–1 | Venda Football Academy |
| | Erasmus 23'; Lorch 113' | Report | Chirambadare 49' |

| 12 March 2023 | TS Galaxy | 3–6 | Stellenbosch | Mbombela |
| | Medina 43' (pen.); Phohlongo 89' (pen.); Sebelebele 90+2' | Report | 3' Titus; 45+4' (pen.), 89' Rayners; 57' de Jong; 64' Mendieta; 90+4' Jabaar | Stadium: Mbombela Stadium; Referee: Sikhumbuzo Gasa |

| 12 March 2023 | Kaizer Chiefs | 2–1 | Casric Stars |
| | Bimenyimana 11'; Du Preez 63' | Report | Mosadi 61' |

== Quarter-finals ==
| 15 April 2023 | Dondol Stars | 1–1 (4–5 p) | Orlando Pirates | Polokwane |
| 15:00 SAST | Makungo 57' | Report | Lorch 55' | Stadium: Peter Mokaba Stadium |
| | Penalties |
| | Monama (penalty scored); Baloyi (penalty scored); Sambo (penalty scored); Mnyembane (penalty scored); Nameka (penalty missed) | | (penalty scored) Hotto; (penalty scored) Sibisi; (penalty scored) Ndlondlo; (penalty scored) Dlamini; (penalty scored) Mthethwa |

| 15 April 2023 | Stellenbosch | 2–1 | Mamelodi Sundowns | Cape Town |
| 18:00 SAST | Rayners 48', 57' | Report | Langeveldt 39' (o.g.) | Stadium: Athlone Stadium |

| 16 April 2023 | Chippa United | 1–2 | Sekhukhune United | Gqeberha |
| 15:00 SAST | Ighodaro 17' | Report | Mokwena 1'; Ohizu 43' | Stadium: Nelson Mandela bay Stadium |

| 16 April 2023 | Royal AM | 1–2 (a.e.t.) | Kaizer Chiefs | Durban |
| 18:00 SAST | Manganyi 28' | Report | Matlaba 36' (o.g.); Du Preez 102' (pen.) | Stadium: Chatsworth Stadium |

== Semi-finals ==
| 6 May 2023 | Kaizer Chiefs | 1–2 | Orlando Pirates | Soweto |
| 15:00 SAST | Maart 78' | Report | Erasmus 13'; Mthethwa 124' | Stadium: FNB Stadium |

| 7 May 2023 | Stellenbosch | 0–0 (3–4 p) | Sekhukhune United | Stellenbosch |
| 18:00 SAST | | Report | | Stadium: Coetzenburg Stadium |
| | Penalties |
| | Rayners (penalty missed); Mgaga (penalty scored); Mendieta (penalty scored); Basadien (penalty scored); Ortiz (penalty missed) | | (penalty scored) Letsoalo; (penalty missed) Vilakazi; (penalty scored) Gyimah; (penalty scored) Cardoso; (penalty scored) Mahlangu |

== Final ==
| 27 May 2023 | Orlando Pirates | 2–1 | Sekhukhune United | Tshwane, South Africa |
| 18:00 SAST | Xoki 45+2' (pen.); Dzvukamanja 90+5' | | 12' Vilakazi | Stadium: Loftus Versfeld Stadium; Referee: Thando Ndzandzeka |

== Statistics ==
=== Top Goal Scorer ===
| Rank | Name | Team | Total goals |
|---|---|---|---|
| 1 | Iqraam Rayners | Stellenbosch F.C. | 6 |
| 1 | Kgomotso Mosadi | Casric Stars | 6 |
| 2 | Peter Shalulile | Mamelodi Sundowns F.C. | 5 |
| 2 | Sabelo Nyembe | Cape Town All Stars | 5 |
| 3 | Thembinkosi Lorch | Orlando Pirates F.C. | 3 |
| 3 | Rhulani Manzini | Venda Football Academy F.C. | 3 |

==== Hat-Tricks ====
| Rank | Name | Team | Against |
|---|---|---|---|
| 1 | Sabelo Nyembe | Cape Town All Stars | TTM |
| 2 | Kgomotso Mosadi | Casric Stars | Uthongathi |
