= Kyle Jurgens =

South African footballer (born 2000)

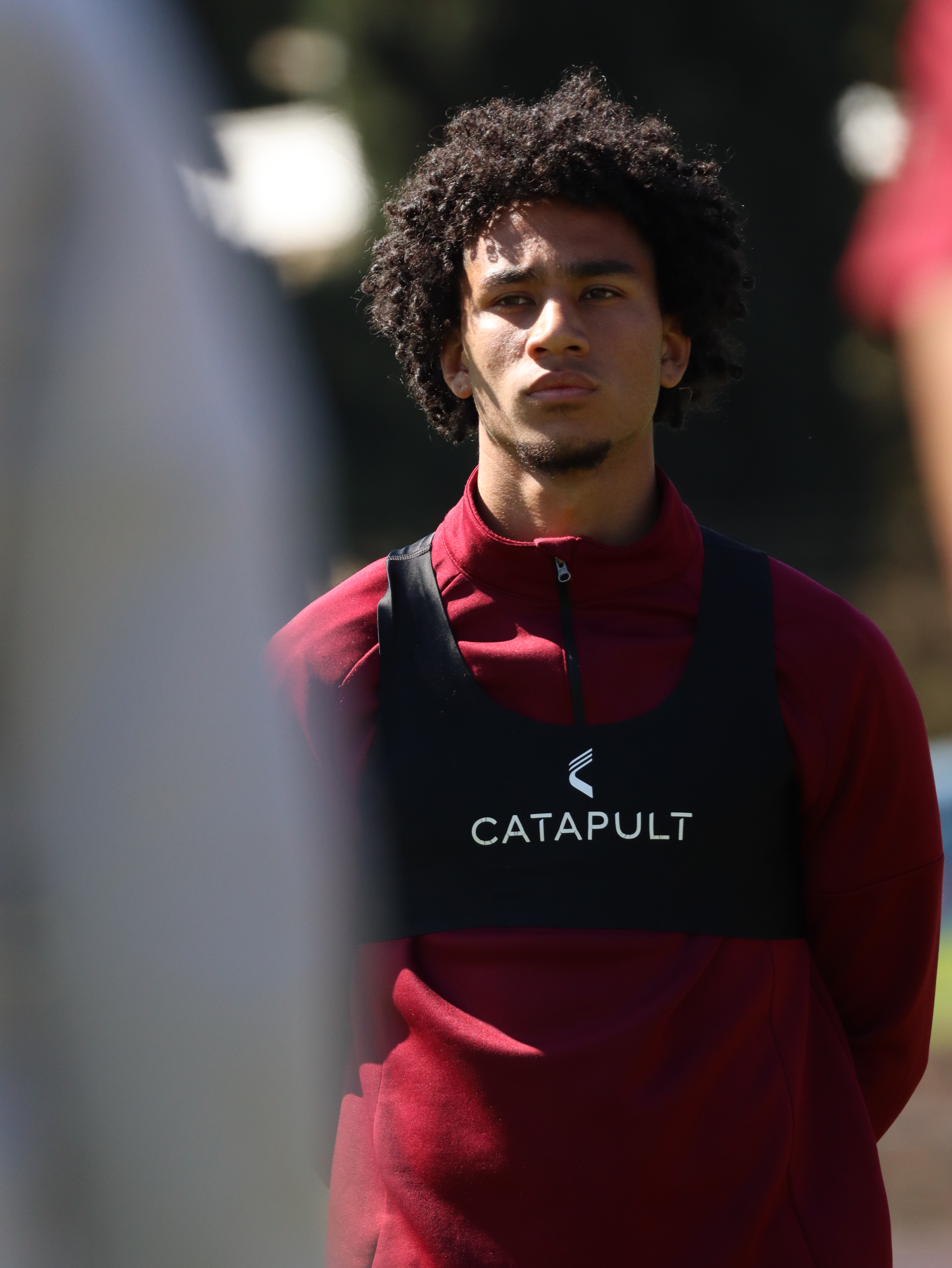

Personal information
- Full name: Kyle Jurgens
- Date of birth: 30 September 2003 (age 23)
- Place of birth: Cape Town, South Africa
- Positions: Defender; midfielder

Team information
- Current team: Durban City (on loan from Stellenbosch FC)
- Number: 17

Youth career
- –2021: Ubuntu Football Academy
- 2021–2024: Stellenbosch FC

Senior career*
Years	Team	Apps	(Gls)
2023–	Stellenbosch FC	31	(0)
2025–	→ Durban City (loan)	24	(0)
- * Club domestic league appearances and goals as of 09:36, 30 April 2026 (UTC)

Kyle Jurgens (born 30 September 2003) is a South African professional footballer who plays as a defender and midfielder for Betway Premiership side Durban City, on loan from Stellenbosch FC.

Having spent his formative years in the Ubuntu Football Academy, Jurgens joined the development structures of Stellenbosch in 2021 and helped the club's reserve team win the DStv Diski Challenge and Premier League Next Gen Cup later that season. He was promoted to the first team in 2023 and went on to make more than 50 senior appearances for Stellenbosch, forming part of the squads that won the 2023 Carling Knockout Cup and ended as runners-up in the 2024 MTN 8 final.

== Club career ==
=== Stellenbosch FC ===
Born in Cape Town, South Africa, Jurgens started his footballing career with the Ubuntu Football Academy, where he received his early training and education. His performances at youth level with Ubuntu earned him a move to Betway Premiership side Stellenbosch FC in 2021 where he played a starring role in the club's reserve team, winning the DStv Diski Challenge and Premier League Next Gen Cup titles in the 2021–22 season. He was subsequently called up to the first team and made his debut as a substitute for Deano van Rooyen in a 3–0 Nedbank Cup Round of 16 win over Moroka Swallows.

The following season, he was permanently promoted to the first team, whilst still eligible for the reserves, and signed his first professional contract in December 2023. Shortly thereafter, Stellenbosch defeated TS Galaxy to win the inaugural edition of the Carling Knockout Cup while Jurgens also added another DStv Diski Challenge medal to his name for his role in helping the reserve team reclaim their title with a league-record 69 points.

== Career statistics ==
=== Club ===
As of 30 April 2026

Appearances and goals by club, season, and competition
Club	Season	League			Cup^{1}		League Cup^{2}		Continental^{3}		Other^{4}		Total	
Club	Season	Division	Apps	Goals	Apps	Goals	Apps	Goals	Apps	Goals	Apps	Goals	Apps	Goals
Stellenbosch FC	2022–23	Premiership	2	0	2	0	–	–	–	–	–	–	4	0
Stellenbosch FC	2023–24	Premiership	13	0	4	0	0	0	–	–	2	0	19	0
Stellenbosch FC	2024–25	Premiership	16	0	1	0	2	0	5	0	3	0	27	0
Durban City (loan)	2025–26	Premiership	24	0	2	0	2	0	–	–	–	–	28	0
Career total			55	0	9	0	4	0	5	0	5	0	79	0

^{1} Includes Nedbank Cup matches.
^{2} Includes Carling Knockout matches.
^{3} Includes CAF Champions League and/or CAF Confederations Cup matches.
^{4} Includes MTN 8 matches.

== Honours ==
Stellenbosch FC

- Carling Knockout Cup: 2023
- DStv Diski Challenge: 2021–22; 2023–24
- Premier League Next Gen Cup: 2022; 2023 (runner-up)
- MTN 8 (runner-up): 2024

Individual

- Stellenbosch FC Reserve Team Player of the Season: 2022–23
