= Soccer records and statistics in South Africa =

The top tier of football in South Africa was renamed the Premiership, under the governance of the Premier Soccer League, for the start of the 1996-97 season. The following page details the football records and statistics of the Premiership since that date.

== Titles ==
- Most titles: 15
  - Mamelodi Sundowns
- Most consecutive title wins: 8
  - Mamelodi Sundowns: (2017-18, 2018-19, 2019-20, 2020-21, 2021-22, 2022–23, 2023–24, 2024–25)
- Biggest title winning margin (34 games): 8 points
  - Manning Rangers: (1996-97)
- Biggest title winning margin (30 games): 16 points
  - Mamelodi Sundowns: (2021-2022)
- Smallest title winning margin: 0 points and +5 goal difference — (1998-99)
  - Mamelodi Sundowns (+44) over Kaizer Chiefs (+39)

== Wins ==
- Most wins in a season (34 games): 23
  - Manning Rangers (1996-97)
  - Mamelodi Sundowns (1998-99), (1999-2000)
  - Kaizer Chiefs (1998-99)
- Most wins in a season (30 games): 22
  - Mamelodi Sundowns (2015-16)
- Most wins in total: 384
  - Mamelodi Sundowns
  - Mamelodi Sundowns (2015-16)
- Most wins in total: 384
- Most wins in a season (28 games): 24
  - Mamelodi Sundowns (2024-25)

== Draws ==
- Most draws in a season (34 games): 16 draws
  - Supersport United (1996-97)
  - Jomo Cosmos (1996-97)
- Most draws in a season (30 games): 20 draws
  - Moroka Swallows (2020-2021)
- Most draws in total: 239
  - Kaizer Chiefs
- Most home draws in a season (34 games):
- Most home draws in a season (30 games):
- Most away draws in a season (34 games):
- Most away draws in a season (30 games):
- Fewest draws in a season: 3 draws
  - Santos (1997-98)
- Fewest home draws in a season:
- Fewest away draws in a season:
- Most consecutive draws in a season:

== Losses ==
- Most losses in a season (34 games): 28
  - Mother City (1999–2000)
- Fewest losses in a season (30 games): 1
  - Mamelodi Sundowns (2020–2021), (2023-2024)
- Most losses in total: 184
  - Amazulu

== Attendance ==
- Highest attendance: 92,515
  - Kaizer Chiefs v. Orlando Pirates (2010-2011)

== Goals ==
- Most goals in a season: 73
  - Mamelodi Sundowns (2024–2025)
- Most goals in a season across all competitions: 105
  - Mamelodi Sundowns (2024–2025)
- Fewest goals in a season: 22
  - Mother City (1999–2000)
- Most goals conceded in a season: 85
  - Mother City (1999–2000)
- Fewest goals conceded in a season: 11
  - Kaizer Chiefs (2003–2004)
- Best goal difference in a season: +44
  - Mamelodi Sundowns (1998–1999)
- Worst goal difference in a season: -63
  - Mother City (1999–2000)
- Most goals by relegated team:
- Most goals in total: 753
  - Kaizer Chiefs
- Most goals conceded: 771
  - Moroka Swallows
- Largest goal deficit overcome to win:
- Largest goal deficit overcome to draw:

== Points ==
- Most points in a season: 73
  - Mamelodi Sundowns (2023-2024 currently)
- Fewest points in a season: 10
  - Mother City (1999–2000)
- Fewest away points in a season: 0
  - Mother City (1999–2000)
- Fewest points surviving relegation:

== Promotion and change in position ==
- Surviving promoted clubs:
- Relegated promoted clubs:
- Promoted but never relegated:
- Biggest rise in position:
- Biggest fall in position:
- Lowest finish by defending champions:

== Miscellaneous ==
- Most Premiership Medals: 12
  - Denis Onyango – Premiership: 2007–08, 2008–09, 2009–10, 2015–16, 2017–18, 2018–19, 2019–20, 2020–21, 2021–22, 2022–23, 2023-24,2024–25, 2024-25

== Appearances and goals ==
- Most Premiership appearances: 316
  - Edries Burton (1996/1997–2006/2007)
- Most Premiership appearances for one club: 316
  - Edries Burton (Engen Santos)
- Oldest player: 46 years
  - Andre Arendse for Bidvest Wits v. Pretoria University, 1 May 2013
- Youngest player: 15 years, 174 days
  - Mkhanyiseli Siwahla for Ajax Cape Town v. Dynamos, 23 February 2004
- Most Premiership goals: 111
  - Siyabonga Nomvethe; 111, Daniel Mudau
- Most Premiership goals for one club: 106
  - Wilfred Mugeyi (Umtata Bush Bucks); 93, Daniel Mudau (Mamelodi Sundowns)
- Oldest Premiership goalscorer: 39 years 10 months and 17 days
  - Siyabonga Nomvethe (Amazulu)
- Youngest Premiership goalscorer: 16 years 7 months and 9 days
  - Siyabonga Mabena for Mamelodi Sundowns against Sekhukhune (27 September 2023)
- Youngest goalscorer: 15 years, 174 days
  - Mkhanyiseli Siwahla for Ajax Cape Town v. Dynamos, 23 February 2004 (ABSA Cup)
- Most consecutive Premiership matches scored in: 7
  - Lehlohonolo Majoro for Kaizer Chiefs 2012–13
- Most consecutive Premiership seasons scored in: 9
  - Katlego Mashego (2004–present)
- Most goals in a season: 25
  - Collins Mbesuma for Kaizer Chiefs (2004–2005)
- Most goals in a calendar year: 35
  - Collins Mbesuma for Kaizer Chiefs 2005
- Most Premiership hat tricks: 6
  - Pollen Ndlanya for AmaZulu and Orlando Pirates (1999–2002)
- Most hat tricks in a season: 3
  - Richard Henyekane for Golden Arrows (2008–2009)
- Most consecutive hat tricks in a season: 2
  - Peter Shalulile for Mamelodi Sundowns (2021–22).
- Most goals in a match: 5
  - James Chamanga, Moroka Swallows 6-2 Platinum Stars, 9 Dec 2007
- Fastest hat trick: A space of 4 minutes (between '20 and '24)
  - James Chamanga, Moroka Swallows 6-2 Platinum Stars, 9 Dec 2007
- Most goals in a debut season: 22
- Wilfred Mugeyi for Bush Bucks (1996–1997)
- Fastest goal: 9 seconds
  - Aleni Lebyane for Free State Stars
- Most consecutive seasons to score at least 15 goals: 4
  - Daniel Mudau for Mamelodi Sundowns (1996–2000)
- Most consecutive seasons to score at least 10 goals: 3
  - Lehlohonolo Majoro (2010–present)
- Most clubs to score for: 7
  - Mabhuti Khenyeza

== Long range goals ==
- Longest range goal: 80 metres
  - Mor Diouf for Supersport United v. Mamelodi Sundowns (2012-2013)

== Goal keeping ==
- Most clean sheets in a Premiership season 19
  - Sipho Chaine for Orlando Pirates (2025-2026)
