= Buthelezi (disambiguation) =

Mangosuthu Buthelezi (1928–2023) was a South African politician and Zulu prince.

Buthelezi or Butelezi may also refer to:

== Tribe ==
- Buthelezi (tribe), a Zulu-speaking tribe in South Africa, assimilated under Shaka during the Mfecane, the name survives as a surname

== People ==
- Anna Buthelezi (born 1965), South African politician
- Sbuyiselwe Angela Buthelezi (1969–2024), South African politician
- Gideon Buthelezi (born 1986), South African light flyweight boxer
- Linda Buthelezi (born 1969), South African footballer who played as a midfielder
- Mbongeni Buthelezi (born 1956), South African artist who "painted" in plastic
- Melusi Buthelezi (born 1998), South African soccer player
- Peter Fanyana John Butelezi, South African archbishop, Roman Catholic Archdiocese of Bloemfontein
- Zuzifa Buthelezi (born 1955), South African politician
