= Sage Stephens =

South African soccer player (born 1991)

Personal information
- Full name: Sage Shane Stephens
- Date of birth: 8 April 1991 (age 35)
- Place of birth: Bertrams, Gauteng South Africa
- Height: 1.87 m (6 ft 2 in)
- Position: Goalkeeper

Team information
- Current team: Stellenbosch
- Number: 17

Senior career*
Years	Team	Apps	(Gls)
2009–2015	Moroka Swallows	6	(0)
2015–2017	AmaZulu	36	(0)
2017–2020	Cape Town City	33	(0)
2020–	Stellenbosch	121	(0)

International career^{‡}
2024	South Africa	1	(0)
- * Club domestic league appearances and goals as of 4 January 2026 ‡ National team caps and goals as of 11 November 2024

Sage Stephens (born 8 April 1991) is a South African soccer player who plays as a goalkeeper for Stellenbosch in the South African Premier Division and the South African national soccer team.

Stephens played six years for Moroka Swallows, but mostly stayed on the bench. He then spent two years with AmaZulu, then in the National First Division. In 2017 he was acquired by Cape Town City, which was seen by the Times as a surprise, but Stephens won the spot as starting goalkeeper ahead of Shu-Aib Walters.

With Cape Town City, Stephens finished second in the 2017 MTN 8. He gradually lost his place to Peter Leeuwenburgh, and was released in September 2020. Stephens was promptly signed by Stellenbosch.

Stephens helped Stellenbosch win the 2023 Carling Knockout Cup. Signing a new contract in 2024, at the time he was the most-capped goalkeeper in Stellenbosch F.C.'s history. By January 2024, half of the games he had played in the 2023–24 South African Premier Division were clean sheets. The following year, he became Stellenbosch FC's all-time appearance record holder after playing his 162nd match for the club, breaking the record previously held by Deano van Rooyen.

== Honours ==
=== Individual ===
- Stellenbosch FC Footballer of the Season: 2025–26
