= Idas Valley Stadium =

Sports stadium in Stellenbosch, South Africa

- Interactive map of Idas Valley Stadium
- Location: Stellenbosch
- Coordinates: 33.92011°S 18.88668°E
- Surface: Grass

Tenant
- Stellenbosch FC

Idas Valley Stadium is a sports venue in Stellenbosch, South Africa, and an alternative home ground of Stellenbosch F.C.

Stellenbosch F.C. and the local municipality worked in conjunction to get the stadium up to the required standard for the 2018–19 National First Division.
