= MCFC =

MCFC may refer to:

- Maiden City F.C., a football club in Northern Ireland
- Manchester City F.C., a football club in England
- Melbourne City FC, a football club in Australia, sharing ownership with Manchester City
- Memphis City FC, a football club in the United States of America, named after Manchester City, though sharing no ownership with it
- Molten carbonate fuel cell
- Mother City F.C., a defunct football club in South Africa
- Mumbai City FC, a football club in India, sharing ownership with Manchester City
