= Steve Barker (soccer) =

South African soccer player and coach

Personal information
- Full name: Steven Robert Barker
- Date of birth: 23 December 1967 (age 58)
- Place of birth: Maseru, Lesotho
- Position: Midfielder

Team information
- Current team: Simba (Head Coach)

Youth career
- Ramblers
- Potchefstroom Celtic
- SANDF

Senior career*
Years	Team	Apps	(Gls)
1990–1998	Wits University		
1999–2000	SuperSport United		

Managerial career
- 2008–2014: University of Pretoria
- 2014–2016: AmaZulu
- 2017–2025: Stellenbosch
- 2025–: Simba
- * Club domestic league appearances and goals

Steven Robert Barker (born 23 December 1967) is a South African former football (soccer) player and Head Coach of Tanzanian Premier League club Simba.

== Personal life ==
Born in Maseru, Lesotho, he is the nephew of South African coach Clive Barker, and cousin of filmmaker John Barker.

== Playing career ==
Barker played club football for Wits University and SuperSport United.

== Coaching career ==
He led the University of Pretoria to promotion to the Premiership in May 2012. He left AmaTuks in November 2014 to join AmaZulu.

He joined Stellenbosch in 2017, leading them to promotion after winning the 2018–19 National First Division title, and winning the 2023 Carling Knockout Cup. After finishing third in the 2023–24 South African Premiership, Barker led the club to the semi-finals of the 2024–25 CAF Confederation Cup, defeating Egyptian giants Zamalek in the quarter-final before losing to Tanzanian club Simba.

In December 2025, as the longest-serving Premiership coach at the time, he joined Simba.

=== Honours ===
==== Simba ====
- Tanzania FA Cup: 2025–26
- Muungano Cup
  - Winner (1): 2025–26

==== Stellenbosch ====
- Carling Knockout Cup: 2023
- National First Division: 2018–19
