= Siphesihle Ndlovu =

South African soccer player

Personal information
- Date of birth: 30 September 1996 (age 30)
- Place of birth: Pietermaritzburg, South Africa
- Height: 1.62 m (5 ft 4 in)
- Position: Midfielder

Team information
- Current team: Kaizer Chiefs
- Number: 8

Youth career
- Umgungundlovu Academy of Sport
- Maritzburg United

Senior career*
Years	Team	Apps	(Gls)
2016–2019	Maritzburg United	72	(6)
2019–2022	Orlando Pirates	41	(2)
2022–2025	SuperSport United	71	(3)
2025–	Kaizer Chiefs	10	(1)

International career^{‡}
2018	South Africa	5	(0)
- * Club domestic league appearances and goals as of 4 January 2026 ‡ National team caps and goals as of 7 October 2022

Siphesihle Ndlovu (born 30 September 1996) is a South African professional soccer player who plays as a midfielder for Premier Soccer League side Kaizer Chiefs and the South Africa national team. An academy graduate of Maritzburg United, he made his professional debut in 2016 and went on to make over 80 appearances for the club.

During the 2017–18 season, he helped the club to record-high fourth-place finish in the league and was rewarded for his form with the Young Player of the Season award. At the end of the following season, he joined Orlando Pirates. He is a fan favorite in Pietermaritzburg and his nickname is Mbesuma. Ndlovu is also a full international since March 2018 and has represented South Africa at a COSAFA Cup.

== Club career ==
=== Maritzburg United ===
Having previously been a ball-boy for the club, Ndlovu joined the youth academy of Maritzburg United from the now defunct Umgungundlovu Academy of Sport in Pietermaritzburg. He excelled during his time in the club's academy where he played in the SAB League and earned the nickname Mbesuma, in reference to former PSL top goalscorer, Collins Mbesuma.

In 2016, he was promoted to senior side by coach Roger De Sa alongside Mlondi Dlamini and Tso Motjatji. He made his debut for the club on 22 October 2016 when he came on as a substitute for Denis Weidlich in a penalty shootout loss to Kaizer Chiefs in the Nedbank Cup. His league debut followed on 20 December in a 1–1 draw with Bidvest Wits and he went on to make 18 appearances across all competitions for the season.

Ndlovu enjoyed a stellar campaign under Fadlu Davids during the 2017–18 season in which he helped the club to an historic league finish. In January 2018, he became the first-ever player from Maritzburg United to win the Absa Premiership Player of the Month award and two months later was rewarded with a new long-term contract with the club, ending speculation linking him with a transfer away. He then made his 50th appearance for the club on 25 April when he started in a 2–2 draw with Mamelodi Sundowns. The following month, he featured in the Nedbank Cup final where Maritzburg United were defeated 1–0 by Free State Stars. The season culminated with Maritzburg United ending fourth in the league; their highest ever finish with their highest ever points tally.

On 21 May, following a campaign in which he played in all but three matches, scored five goals and was the most fouled player in the league, Ndlovu was nominated for a host of PSL awards including the awards for Midfielder of the Season, Young Player of the Season and Footballer of the Season. He was also nominated for the Most Promising Player award for his performances in the Nedbank Cup. The award ceremony was held eight days later during which he walked away with the Midfielder of the Season and Young Player of the Season awards.

Ahead of the following season, Ndlovu reportedly agreed to a deal in principle to sign with Mamelodi Sundowns at the end of the campaign. He struggled for form during the first half of the season and picked up his first professional red card when he received a direct dismissal for a studs-up challenge on Kaizer Chiefs defender Siyabonga Ngezana in August. His struggles coincided with those of the Maritzburg United's who ended the domestic season second last in the league standings, having gone through three managers. As a result, the club was forced to take part in the promotion play-offs in which Ndlovu scored once to ensure they maintained their top-flight status.

=== Orlando Pirates ===
On 12 June 2019, Ndlovu confirmed that he had signed a three-year deal with Orlando Pirates. Upon making the announcement, he informed media that he had never signed any agreement with Sundowns and that his reason for joining Pirates was that the club's style of play suited his abilities.

== International career ==
=== South Africa ===
In March 2018, Ndlovu was called up to the South African national team for the first time by coach Stuart Baxter for the inaugural Four Nations Invitational Tournament. He made his debut on 21 March, coming on as a second-half substitute for Maphosa Modiba in a 1–1 (7–6) penalty shootout win over Angola. He made his first start three days later as South Africa beat hosts Zambia 2–0 to claim the title.

Later that year he was named in Baxter's squad for the 2018 COSAFA Cup. He started in South Africa's opening match in the competition, a penalty shootout loss to Madagascar. He featured throughout the tournament as South Africa went on to lift the Plate title, equivalent of a fifth-placed finish.

== Career statistics ==
=== Club ===
As of match played 14 October 2020

Appearances and goals by club, season and competition
Club	Season	League			Cup^{1}		League Cup^{2}		Continental^{3}		Other^{4}		Total	
Club	Season	Division	Apps	Goals	Apps	Goals	Apps	Goals	Apps	Goals	Apps	Goals	Apps	Goals
Maritzburg United	2016–17	PSL	16	0	1	0	1	0	0	0	0	0	18	0
Maritzburg United	2017–18	PSL	27	5	4	0	0	0	0	0	3	0	34	5
Maritzburg United	2018–19	PSL	25	0	0	0	2	1	0	0	5	1	32	2
Total			68	5	5	0	3	1	0	0	8	1	84	7
Orlando Pirates	2019–20	PSL	13	0	1	0	1	0	0	0	0	0	15	0
Career total			81	5	6	0	4	1	0	0	8	1	99	7

^{1} Includes Nedbank Cup matches.
^{2} Includes Telkom Knockout matches.
^{4} Includes MTN 8 and PSL promotion play-off matches.

=== International ===
As of 8 June 2018

National team	Year	Apps	Goals
South Africa	2018	5	0
Total		5	0

== Honours ==
=== Individual ===
- PSL Player of the Month: January 2018
- PSL Young Player of the Season: 2017–18
- PSL Midfielder of the Season: 2017–18

=== Orlando Pirates F.C ===
2019

- MTN 8
