= Given Msimango =

South African soccer player

Personal information
- Full name: Sphiwe Given Msimango
- Date of birth: 4 May 1997 (age 29)
- Place of birth: Brakpan, South Africa
- Height: 6 ft 2 in (1.89 m)
- Position: Defender

Team information
- Current team: Kaizer Chiefs
- Number: 25

Senior career*
Years	Team	Apps	(Gls)
2018–2020	Highlands Park	37	(2)
2020–2023	TS Galaxy	70	(4)
2023–	Kaizer Chiefs	35	(0)
- * Club domestic league appearances and goals as of 4 January 2026

Sphiwe Given Msimango (born 4 May 1997) is a South African soccer player who plays for South African Premier Division side Kaizer Chiefs as a defender.

Msimango played first-tier soccer for Highlands Park, whose licence was bought by TS Galaxy owned Tim Sukazi. Msimango subsequently continued his career in TS Galaxy. He played in defense and became the team captain. He was also active on Instagram and held deals to promote clothing brands.

During the 2022–23 South African Premier Division, Msimango featured in all 30 games. Reportedly, he had paid a physical coach out of his own pocket to ensure his playing fitness. His good form throughout the season earned him a transfer to big club Kaizer Chiefs. TS Galaxy owner commented on why they sold their best player: "We are realistic as well with regards to our business model as in how we are going to build and continue building this business model. Part of the model, of course, will be to follow the likes of Tottenham Hotspur".

The 2023–24 South African Premier Division saw Kaizer Chiefs finish in an all-time low position of 10th. Msimango was however called up to Bafana Bafana for 2026 World Cup qualifying matches in June 2024.
