= Tshepo Liphoko =

South African soccer player

Personal information
- Date of birth: 21 February 1995 (age 31)
- Position: Midfielder

Team information
- Current team: Uthongathi

Youth career
- –2013: Orlando Pirates

Senior career*
| Years | Team | Apps | (Gls) |
| 2013 | Orlando Pirates | 0 | (0) |
| 2013 | → Lamontville Golden Arrows (loan) | 12 | (0) |
| 2013–2016 | AmaZulu | 35 | (2) |
| 2016–2018 | Mbombela United | 46 | (9) |
| 2018– | Uthongathi | 35 | (3) |
- * Club domestic league appearances and goals as of 21:36, 7 October 2020 (UTC)

Tshepo Liphoko (born 21 February 1995) is a South African soccer player who plays as a midfielder for Uthongathi.

== Career ==
Liphoko started his career at Orlando Pirates, and had a loan spell at Lamontville Golden Arrows in 2013. He has since played for AmaZulu, Mbombela United and Uthongathi.

== Personal life ==
In 2015, Liphoko was involved in a car accident alongside team-mate Mbongeni Gumede.
