= Mbongeni Gumede =

South African soccer player

Personal information
- Date of birth: 11 September 1993 (age 33)
- Place of birth: Durban, South Africa
- Height: 1.70 m (5 ft 7 in)
- Position: Right-back

Team information
- Current team: AmaZulu

Senior career*
| Years | Team | Apps | (Gls) |
| 2012–2016 | Orlando Pirates | 3 | (0) |
| 2013 | → Jomo Cosmos (loan) | 12 | (0) |
| 2015–2016 | → AmaZulu (loan) | 26 | (0) |
| 2016– | AmaZulu | 161 | (5) |
- * Club domestic league appearances and goals as of 1 August 2024

Mbongeni Gumede (born 11 September 1993) is a South African soccer player who plays as a right-back for South African Premier Division side AmaZulu.

== Career ==
Born in Durban, Gumede started his career at Orlando Pirates before joining Jomo Cosmos on a loan until the end of the season in January 2013. Gumede joined AmaZulu in the summer of 2015 on a season-long loan, before joining the club on a permanent basis the following summer.

== Personal life ==
In 2015, Gumede was involved in a car accident alongside team-mate Tshepo Liphoko.
