= Melusi Buthelezi =

South African soccer player

Personal information
- Full name: Melusi Nkazimulo Buthelezi
- Date of birth: 7 March 1998 (age 28)
- Place of birth: Nquthu, South Africa
- Height: 1.93 m (6 ft 4 in)
- Position: Goalkeeper

Team information
- Current team: Orlando Pirates
- Number: 35

Senior career*
Years	Team	Apps	(Gls)
2018–2020	Jomo Cosmos	23	(0)
2020–2023	TS Galaxy	32	(0)
2024–	Orlando Pirates	15	(0)

International career^{‡}
2022	South Africa	1	(0)
- * Club domestic league appearances and goals as of 3 January 2026 ‡ National team caps and goals as of 27 March 2024

Melusi Buthelezi (born 7 March 1998) is a South African professional soccer player who plays as a goalkeeper for Orlando Pirates in the Premier Soccer League.

Buthelezi started his senior career with Jomo Cosmos in the National First Division before moving on to TS Galaxy in 2020. While he did not play once during his first season, he entered the starting eleven during the 2021-22 South African Premier Division. Buthelezi also made his international debut for South Africa, when entering as a substitute in a friendly match against Sierra Leone.

In the 2022-23 South African Premier Division, Buthelezi kept 10 clean sheets in the 21 games he played. As he left TS Galaxy and was signed by Orlando Pirates, he kept 8 clean sheets in his first 10 games.

Buthelezi was carjacked in 2022 at a petrol station in Soweto, where he and his brother suffered light stab wounds. In February 2024 he was mugged for his belongings, then driven off in his own car. The incident happened in Thokoza. Buthelezi returned to freedom the next day.
