= 2022–23 South African Premiership =

Football league season

Premiership
- Season: 2022–23
- Dates: 5 August 2022 – 20 May 2023
- Champions: Mamelodi Sundowns
- Relegated: Marumo Gallants
- Champions League: Mamelodi Sundowns Orlando Pirates
- Matches: 240
- Goals: 503 (2.1 per match)
- Top goalscorer: (12 goals); Peter Shalulile (Mamelodi Sundowns) (12 goals); Khanyisa Mayo "(Cape Town City)"
- Biggest home win: Mamelodi Sundowns 4–0 Kaizer Chiefs (13 August 2022); Golden Arrows 4–0 Swallows (16 September 2022); AmaZulu 4–0 Kaizer Chiefs (13 January 2023)
- Biggest away win: Maritzburg United 0–5 Mamelodi Sundowns (26 August 2022)
- Longest winning run: (15 wins); Mamelodi Sundowns
- Longest unbeaten run: (24 games); Mamelodi Sundowns
- Longest winless run: (13 games); Richards Bay
- Longest losing run: (7 losses); Richards Bay
- Highest attendance: (90 000); Orlando Pirates 0-1 Kaizer Chiefs; 29 October 2022
- All statistics correct as of 14 January 2022.

The 2022–23 South African Premiership (known as the DSTV Premiership for sponsorship reasons) was the 27th season of the Premier Soccer League since its establishment in 1996. It was played from 5 August 2022 to 20 May 2023 Mamelodi Sundowns successfully defended the title for the 6th time, having won the title from the 2017–18 season. Sekhukhune United relocated from Ellis Park Stadium to Peter Mokaba Stadium.

== Teams ==
=== Team changes ===
The following teams changed divisions since the end of the 2021-22 season

Promoted from the 2021–22 National First Division

•Richards Bay F.C.

Relegated from the 2021–22 South African Premier Division

•Baroka F.C.

=== Location of teams ===
Location of teams in the 2022–23 PSL.

=== Stadiums and locations ===
Team	Location	Stadium	Capacity
AmaZulu	Durban	Moses Mabhida Stadium	55,500
Cape Town City	Cape Town	Cape Town Stadium	55,000
Chippa United	Gqeberha	Nelson Mandela Bay Stadium	48,459
Golden Arrows	Durban (Clermont)	Sugar Ray Xulu Stadium	12,000
Kaizer Chiefs	Johannesburg (Soweto)	FNB Stadium	94,736
Mamelodi Sundowns	Pretoria (Marabastad)	Loftus Versfeld Stadium	51,762
Maritzburg United	Petermaritzburg	Harry Gwala Stadium	12,000
Marumo Gallants	Polokwane	Peter Mokaba Stadium	45,500
Orlando Pirates	Johannesburg (Soweto)	Orlando Stadium	37,139
Richards Bay	Richards Bay	Richards Bay Stadium	8,000
Royal AM	Chatsworth	Chatsworth Stadium	6,500
Sekhukhune United	Polokwane	Peter Mokaba Stadium	45,500
Stellenbosch	Stellenbosch	Danie Craven Stadium	8,000
SuperSport United	Pretoria (Atteridgeville)	Lucas Masterpieces Moripe Stadium	28,900
Swallows	Johannesburg (Soweto)	Dobsonville Stadium	24,000
TS Galaxy	Mbombela	Mbombela Stadium	40,929

=== Number of teams by province ===
Position	Province	Number	Teams
1	Gauteng	5	Kaizer Chiefs, Mamelodi Sundowns, Swallows, Orlando Pirates, SuperSport United
1	KwaZulu-Natal	5	AmaZulu, Golden Arrows, Maritzburg United, Richards Bay, Royal AM
3	Western Cape	2	Cape Town City and Stellenbosch
3	Limpopo	2	Marumo Gallants and Sekhukhune United
5	Eastern Cape	1	Chippa United
5	Mpumalanga	1	TS Galaxy

== League table ==
Pos	Team	Pld	W	D	L	GF	GA	GD	Pts	Qualification or relegation
1	Mamelodi Sundowns (C)	30	21	7	2	52	13	+39	70	Qualification for Champions League
2	Orlando Pirates	30	16	6	8	40	21	+19	54	Qualification for Champions League
3	SuperSport United	30	14	9	7	34	22	+12	51	Qualification for Confederation Cup
4	Cape Town City	30	12	9	9	34	30	+4	45	
5	Kaizer Chiefs	30	13	5	12	32	33	−1	44	
6	Stellenbosch	30	10	10	10	39	38	+1	40	
7	Sekhukhune United	30	10	10	10	24	27	−3	40	
8	Swallows	30	11	7	12	26	33	−7	40	
9	Lamontville Golden Arrows	30	10	8	12	32	40	−8	38	
10	TS Galaxy	30	7	14	9	28	22	+6	35	
11	Royal AM	30	9	8	13	33	43	−10	35	
12	AmaZulu	30	7	12	11	29	33	−4	33	
13	Richards Bay	30	8	9	13	20	30	−10	33	
14	Chippa United	30	7	9	14	29	44	−15	30	
15	Maritzburg United (R)	30	7	9	14	24	40	−16	30	Qualification for Playoffs
16	Marumo Gallants (R)	30	5	14	11	27	34	−7	29	Relegation to the First Division

Source: Premier Soccer League
(C) Champions; (R) Relegated

== Results ==
Home \ Away	AMA	CTC	CHI	GDA	TSG	KZC	MAG	MDS	MAR	RBU	SWA	ORL	ROY	SEK	STL	SSU
AmaZulu	—	2–1	1–2	0–1	1–2	4–0	1–1	2–2	1–1	0–1	0–1	0–4	1–1	2–0	1–0	2–1
Cape Town City	2–2	—	2–1	0–0	1–0	2–0	2–2	0–2	0–0	2–0	2–0	2–1	2–1	0–0	1–1	0–1
Chippa United	0–2	1–1	—	0–0	0–0	0–1	1–0	0–1	1–0	3–3	1–2	0–2	1–3	1–0	1–2	1–1
Lamontville Golden Arrows	1–0	1–1	3–2	—	0–0	0–2	3–2	1–1	0–1	0–2	4–0	0–2	1–2	0–0	1–1	2–1
TS Galaxy	0–0	0–1	4–0	4–0	—	0–0	0–1	1–2	1–2	4–0	0–0	1–2	1–1	1–1	0–0	2–0
Kaizer Chiefs	0–0	0–1	1–2	2–3	2–2	—	1–1	0–1	3–0	1–0	1–2	1–0	2–0	0–1	2–1	2–1
Marumo Gallants	0–0	2–1	3–1	1–1	0–0	1–1	—	0–2	0–1	0–2	1–1	0–2	3–1	2–0	0–0	0–0
Mamelodi Sundowns	1–0	0–0	2–1	2–1	0–1	4–0	1–0	—	1–1	1–0	2–0	2–0	5–1	2–0	3–0	1–0
Maritzburg United	1–1	1–2	2–1	0–2	1–2	2–3	2–2	0–5	—	1–1	0–0	1–0	3–1	1–1	1–0	1–2
Richards Bay	1–1	1–0	2–3	0–1	0–0	0–1	0–0	0–2	0–0	—	1–0	0–2	0–0	1–0	1–2	0–1
Swallows	2–3	3–2	2–0	0–1	0–0	1–2	2–0	0–0	1–0	1–0	—	1–4	2–0	2–1	1–2	0–0
Orlando Pirates	1–1	2–1	0–1	3–1	2–0	0–1	1–0	0–1	2–1	0–0	1–0	—	1–1	1–1	4–1	1–0
Royal AM	2–0	1–2	1–1	3–1	0–0	1–0	2–2	0–3	1–0	0–1	0–1	0–1	—	2–0	3–1	1–1
Sekhukhune United	0–0	0–1	1–1	1–0	1–1	1–0	3–2	1–1	1–0	2–0	1–0	2–0	1–2	—	1–1	1–0
Stellenbosch	2–0	3–2	1–1	5–2	2–1	1–3	1–1	1–1	3–0	1–2	3–0	1–1	3–1	0–1	—	0–2
SuperSport United	2–1	2–0	1–1	2–1	2–0	1–0	1–0	2–1	2–0	1–1	1–1	0–0	3–1	3–1	0–0	—

Source: Flashscore
Legend: Blue = home team win; Yellow = draw; Red = away team win.

== Statistics ==
=== Top scorers ===
As of 13 May 2023

Rank	Player	Club	Goals
1	(Namibia) Peter Shalulile	Mamelodi Sundowns	12
1	(South Africa) Khanyisa Mayo	Cape Town City	12
3	(South Africa) Monnapule Saleng	Orlando Pirates	11
4	(Nigeria) Etiosa Ighodaro	Chippa United	10
4	(South Africa) Bradley Grobler	SuperSport United	10
4	(South Africa) Ranga Chivaviro	Marumo Gallants	10
7	(South Africa) Iqraam Rayners	Stellenbosch	9
7	(South Africa) Cassius Mailula	Mamelodi Sundowns	9
9	(Argentina) Júnior Mendieta	Stellenbosch	8
9	(France) Amadou Soukouna	Maritzburg United	8

=== Hat-tricks ===
Key
H	Home game
A	Away game

Player	For	Against	Result	Date
(Burundi) Bonfils-Caleb Bimenyimana	Kaizer Chiefs	Stellenbosch	3-1 A	9 October 2022
(South Africa) Monnapule Saleng	Orlando Pirates	Swallows	4-1 A	3 March 2023

=== Clean sheets ===
As of 30 October 2022

No	Player	Club	Clean sheets
1	(South Africa) Ronwen Williams	Mamelodi Sundowns	13
2	(Uganda) Jamal Salim	Richards Bay	11
3	(South Africa) Melusi Buthelezi	TS Galaxy	9
4	(South Africa) Veli Mothwa	AmaZulu	7
5	(Ghana) Richard Ofori	Orlando Pirates	5
5	(South Africa) Thakasani Mbanjwa	Swallows	5
5	(Ivory Coast) Badra Ali Sangare	Sekhukhune United	5
5	(South Africa) Darren Keet	Cape Town City	5
9	(South Africa) Ricardo Goss	SuperSport United	4
9	(Zimbabwe) Washington Arubi	Marumo Gallants	4
11	(South Africa) Cedric Gumede	Golden Arrows	3
11	(South Africa) Sage Stephens	Stellenbosch	3

== See also ==
- 2022 MTN 8
- 2022-23 Nedbank Cup
- 2022-23 National First Division
- 2022-23 SAFA Women's League
