= Thabiso Lebitso =

South African soccer player

Personal information
- Full name: Thabiso Lebitso
- Date of birth: 4 March 1992 (age 34)
- Place of birth: South Africa
- Positions: Right winger; right back

Team information
- Current team: Stellenbosch F.C.
- Number: 37

Senior career*
| Years | Team | Apps | (Gls) |
| –2019 | Tshwane University of Technology | | |
| 2019–2023 | Chippa United | 87 | (2) |
| 2023–2026 | Orlando Pirates | 15 | (1) |
| 2026 | Stellenbosch | 3 | (0) |
- * Club domestic league appearances and goals as of 3 January 2026

Thabiso Lebitso (born 4 March 1992) is a South African soccer player who plays as a midfielder for South African Premier Division side Orlando Pirates.

== Career ==
In December 2019, Lebitso signed for South African Premier Division side Chippa United from Tshwane University of Technology.

He was signed by Orlando Pirates in January 2024. He made 8 appearances for the club before suffering a broken collarbone in April 2024, and upon his return from injury in summer 2024, he suffered a knee injury, which kept him out for a significant period at the start of the 2024–25 season.

== Style of play ==
During his time at Chippa United, Lebitso was primarily a right winger, but he has been used as a right back since joining Orlando Pirates.
