= Deano van Rooyen =

South African soccer player (born 1996)

Personal information
- Full name: Deano David van Rooyen
- Date of birth: 24 November 1996 (age 29)
- Place of birth: Stellenbosch, South Africa
- Height: 1.77 m (5 ft 10 in)
- Position: Right back

Team information
- Current team: Mamelodi Sundowns
- Number: 21

Senior career*
Years	Team	Apps	(Gls)
2016–2024	Stellenbosch	141	(5)
2024–2026	Orlando Pirates	22	(1)
2026–	Mamelodi Sundowns	0	(0)

International career^{‡}
2025–	South Africa	2	(0)
- * Club domestic league appearances and goals as of 22:50, 6 January 2026 (UTC) ‡ National team caps and goals as of 22:50, 6 January 2026 (UTC)

Deano David van Rooyen (born 24 November 1996) is a South African professional soccer player who plays as a right back for Mamelodi Sundowns and the South Africa national team.

== Club career ==
Van Rooyen was born in Stellenbosch on 24 November 1996. He is the cousin of fellow footballer Ashley Du Preez. He grew up initially in the Cloetesville area of Stellenbosch, but moved in with his aunt, and the mother of Du Preez, in Idas Valley aged 7. Van Rooyen and Du Preez joined Stellenbosch together in the 2015–16 season. He made 141 league appearances at the club and scored 5 goals, over eight years at the club.

In summer 2024, he transferred to Orlando Pirates, signing a three year contract with the option for a further two years. He scored once in 20 South African Premier Division matches during his debut season at the club. After suffering injury issues at the start of the 2025–26 season, he lost his starting place to Thabiso Lebitso.

On 6 September 2026, Van Rooyen joined Mamelodi Sundowns as a free agent, signing a multi-year contract.

== International career ==
Van Rooyen received his first call-up to the South Africa national team in June 2025. He appeared in two friendlies in June 2025, against Mozambique and Tanzania.
