= Fawaaz Basadien =

South African soccer player (born 1996)

Personal information
- Full name: Fawaaz Basadien
- Date of birth: 23 December 1996 (age 29)
- Position: Defender

Team information
- Current team: Mamelodi Sundowns
- Number: 23

Senior career*
Years	Team	Apps	(Gls)
2016–2018	Milano United	11	(0)
2018	Cape Town City	0	(0)
2018–2019	Ubuntu Cape Town	17	(3)
2019–2020	Steenberg United	8	(0)
2020-2022	Moroka Swallows	29	(1)
2022–2025	Stellenbosch	50	(1)
2025–	Mamelodi Sundowns	5	(0)

International career^{‡}
2024–	South Africa	1	(0)
- * Club domestic league appearances and goals as of 3 January 2026 ‡ National team caps and goals as of 7 August 2025

Fawaaz Basadien (born 23 December 1996) is a South African soccer player who plays as a defender for Premier Soccer League club Mamelodi Sundowns and the South Africa national team.

He won the 2023 Carling Knockout Cup with Stellenbosch.

== Career ==
After unassuming spells with Milano United, Cape Town City, Ubuntu Cape Town and Steenberg United, Basadien was signed by first-tier team Moroka Swallows in 2020. He made his first-tier debut during the 2020-21 South African Premier Division.

After surviving the 2021-22 South African Premier Division with Swallows after a playoff, Basadien moved on to Stellenbosch on a two-year contract. In 2023, Basadien helped Stellenbosch win the Carling Black Label Cup, and was also named in a preliminary Bafana Bafana squad prior to the 2023 Africa Cup of Nations. In the middle of the 2023–24 season, there were persistent rumours about Basadien joining Kaizer Chiefs, but instead Basadien prolonged his contract with the Stellies.

=== Mamelodi Sundowns ===
Basadien joined Mamelodi Sundowns in 2025.

== Honours ==
- Carling Knockout Cup: 2023
- MTN 8: Runners-up: 2024
- CAF Champions League: 2026
