= Mother City F.C. =

South African association football club

Mother City
- Full name: Mother City Football Club
- Founded: 1999
- Dissolved: 2002

Mother City F.C. was a South African association football club founded in 1999 after Seven Stars and Cape Town Spurs merged to form Ajax Cape Town, and Mother City purchased the Cape Town Spurs licence. The club was based in Cape Town.

== History ==
The club set a number of unwanted records in its only season in the top flight. These included most losses in a season (28), fewest goals scored (22), most goals conceded (85), worst goal difference (-63), fewest points scored (10) and fewest away points scored (0).

The club suffered two relegations in three years.

== Former managers ==
- (South Africa) Bernard Hartze (1999–2000)

== League history ==
Season	Division	Final position	Games played	Games won	Games Drew	Games lost	Goals for	Goals against	Pointes	Notes
1999–00	Premiership	18	34	2	4	28	22	−85	10	Relegated
2000–01	National First Division (Coastal Stream)	8	26	9	8	9	32	−31	32	
2001–02	National First Division (Coastal Stream)	14	26	1	10	15	20	−41	13	Relegated
