= Washington Arubi =

Zimbabwean professional footballer (born 1985)

Personal information
- Full name: Washington Arubi
- Date of birth: 29 August 1985 (age 41)
- Place of birth: Norton, Zimbabwe
- Height: 1.80 m (5 ft 11 in)
- Position: Goalkeeper

Team information
- Current team: CAPS United

Senior career*
Years	Team	Apps	(Gls)
2005–2006	Lancashire Steel	29	(0)
2007–2008	Highlanders	19	(0)
2009	Bantu Rovers	11	(0)
2010–2012	Dynamos		
2012–2016	Pretoria University	105	(0)
2017–2018	Stellenbosch	38	(1)
2018–2020	SuperSport United	0	(0)
2020–2021	Tshakhuma Tsha Madzivhandila	28	(0)
2021–2023	Marumo Gallants	48	(0)
2023–2024	SuperSport United	6	(0)
2024–2026	Marumo Gallants	33	
2026–	CAPS United		

International career^{‡}
1999–2001	Zimbabwe U20	15	(0)
2004–2005	Zimbabwe U23	8	(0)
2005–	Zimbabwe	43	(0)
- * Club domestic league appearances and goals as of 4 January 2026 ‡ National team caps and goals as of 29 December 2025

Washington Arubi (born 29 August 1985) is a Zimbabwean professional footballer who plays as a goalkeeper for Zimbabwe Premier Soccer League side CAPS United.

== Career ==
=== Club ===
He started his career with Lancashire Steel for which he played 29 matches, before having spells with other Zimbabwean clubs Highlanders, Bantu Rovers and Dynamos. In 2012, Arubi joined South African Premiership team University of Pretoria. He made 105 appearances in the league for Tuks before leaving in 2016. In February 2017, Arubi joined National First Division side Stellenbosch.

Arubi signed for SuperSport United on a free transfer in summer 2018.

He joined Tshakhuma Tsha Madzivhandila on a two-year contract in October 2020, where he was named vice-captain.

Following his signature with CAPS United in 2026, he became one of the few players to feature for all three traditional Zimbabwean giants, having started at Highlanders and later joining Dynamos.

=== International ===
In 2007, he played as the goalkeeper for the Zimbabwe national football team during the COSAFA Cup. He participated in the qualification matches for the Africa Cup of Nations 2015.

On 11 December 2025, Arubi was called up to the Zimbabwe squad for the 2025 Africa Cup of Nations.

== Honours ==
Dynamos 2010–12

- Zimbabwe Premier Soccer League (1): 2011
- Cup of Zimbabwe (1): 2011
