= Rhulani Manzini =

South African soccer player

Personal information
- Date of birth: 6 March 1988 (age 38)
- Place of birth: Acornhoek, South Africa
- Position: Forward

Team information
- Current team: Magesi
- Number: 29

Senior career*
Years	Team	Apps	(Gls)
2009–2011	Batau		
2011–2013	Jomo Cosmos	4	(0)
2013–2014	Sivutsa Stars	6	(0)
2014	Witbank Spurs	7	(2)
2014–2015	Platinum Stars	9	(1)
2015–2017	Chippa United	31	(11)
2017–2018	AmaZulu	19	(5)
2018–2020	Chippa United	29	(6)
2020–2021	Marumo Gallants	11	(2)
2021–2024	Tshakhuma Tsha Madzivhandila	12	(2)
2024–	Magesi	8	(1)
- * Club domestic league appearances and goals as of 21:19, 30 October 2024 (UTC)

Rhulani Manzini (born 6 March 1988) is a South African soccer player who plays for South African Premier Division side Magesi, as a forward.

== Career ==
Born in Bushbuckridge in Mpumalanga, he began his career at Batau in 2009, before joining Jomo Cosmos in 2011. He made his debut in the South African Premier Division in December 2011 in a 2–1 victory over Platinum Stars. After spells at Sivutsa Stars and Witbank Spurs during the 2013–14 season, he joined Platinum Stars in the summer of 2014. After scoring once in nine league appearances for Platinum Stars, he signed for Chippa United in 2015. He appeared in 31 league matches for Chippa, scoring eleven goals, before leaving to join AmaZulu in August 2017. He returned to Chippa United the following summer but was released by the club in December 2019. He threatened legal action with Chippa United in 2020 after not receiving a settlement following the termination of his contract. He joined Tshakhuma Tsha Madzivhandila in November 2020.
