= Sabelo Nyembe =

South African soccer player

Personal information
- Full name: Sabelo Phumlani Nyembe
- Date of birth: 24 December 1991 (age 34)
- Position: Midfielder

Team information
- Current team: Highlands Park
- Number: 11

Senior career*
Years	Team	Apps	(Gls)
2013–2018	Witbank Spurs	75	(10)
2018–	Highlands Park	40	(4)
- * Club domestic league appearances and goals as of 16:30, 29 August 2020 (UTC)

Sabelo Phumlani Nyembe (born 24 December 1991) is a South African soccer player who plays as a midfielder for South African Premier Division side Highlands Park.
