= Mbongeni Buthelezi =

South African artist

- Born: 1966 (age 59–60); Johannesburg, South Africa
- Known for: Paintings, Collages

Mbongeni Buthelezi, born 1966 in Johannesburg in South Africa, is an artist who became known for "painting" in plastic.

== Life ==
Buthelezi attended courses at the Singaporean Institute of Art in Johannesburg from 1986 until 1992 and later also at the University of Witwatersrand from 1997 until 1998.

He was "artist in residence" several times:

- Guest Artist, Wiesbaden, Germany
- Kunst:Raum Sylt-Quelle, Rantum, Germany
- Atelierhaus Höherweg e.V., Düsseldorf, Germany
- Standard Bank National Art Festival, South Africa
- Vermont Studio Centre, New York, USA
- Art Omi International Artists Centre, New York USA

== Work philosophy ==
The material that Mbongeni Buthelezi uses for his "paintings" is always waste made of plastic: he cuts it into little pieces and glues them onto the canvas, creating surfaces and structures with subtle and changing tones and coloures. The use of such material shows Buthelezi's awareness of environmental problems and the physical decay of the townships as well as the references to general social and political impoverishment and flaw of opportunities and alternatives that he observes in South Africa.

Through his work, Buthelezi wants to mediate and communicate hope. He is convinced that seeing his works and his history, people are able to realise that in South Africa there are many opportunities, too, and that it is possible to create a better life and a career out of nothing; making art would enable people to change their lives and to contribute something positive to the world.

Buthelezi states about his style: “I now have 18 different techniques, each of which have subtle differences from the other. The material can be applied like large ‘brushstrokes' in many colours, or sepia toned where layers of neutral shading creates visual depth and subtlety or applied in a linear manner.”

Buthelezi's works have been exhibited internationally, including the Museum of African Art in New York, the Goch Museum in Germany as well as the Prague Biennale.

his works are part of a various collections, amongst them:

- Mercedes-Benz South Africa, Pretoria, South Africa
- Daimler AG, Kunstbesitz, Stuttgart, Germany
- Museum for African Art, New York City
- Johannesburg Art Gallery, South Africa
- Spier Collection, South Africa

== Literature ==
- Catalogue-download at Artsourcesouthafrica
- Article on Artsourcesouthafrica
- Gruntkowski, Nina, und Pretoria Art Museum. Mbongeni Buthelezi, imizwa yami (my feelings). Seippel, 2009.
- Chimzima, Pitso, und Susanne Madaus. Mbongeni Buthelezi. Museum Goch, 2004.
