= Iqraam Rayners =

South African soccer player (born 1995)

Personal information
- Date of birth: 19 December 1995 (age 30)
- Place of birth: Cape Town, South Africa
- Height: 1.76 m (5 ft 9 in)
- Position: Forward

Team information
- Current team: Mamelodi Sundowns
- Number: 13

Youth career
- Kenpark United
- –2014: Santos

Senior career*
Years	Team	Apps	(Gls)
2014–2017	Santos	57	(5)
2017–2020	Stellenbosch	76	(35)
2020–2023	SuperSport United	51	(6)
2023–2024	Stellenbosch	38	(24)
2024–	Mamelodi Sundowns	37	(24)

International career^{‡}
2023–	South Africa	26	(6)
- * Club domestic league appearances and goals as of 29 June 2026 ‡ National team caps and goals as of 30 September 2026

Iqraam Rayners (born 19 December 1995) is a South African professional soccer player who plays as a forward for South African Premiership side Mamelodi Sundowns and the South Africa national team.

== Club career ==
Rayners played youth football with Kenpark United before joining Santos at under-17 level. He made his debut for them during the 2014–15 season. He played for Stellenbosch before joining SuperSport United in summer 2020 after signing a pre-contract agreement in January 2020. Rayners returned to Stellenbosch FC in 2023 and used to wear the number nine jersey.

=== Mamelodi Sundowns ===
On 22 August 2024, Mamelodi Sundowns signed Rayners from Stellenbosch on free transfer.

In June 2025, he was included in Mamelodi Sundowns' squad for the 2025 FIFA Club World Cup. On 17 June 2025, Rayners scored the only goal in the FIFA Club World Cup to secure Mamelodi Sundowns' first-ever victory over South Korea’s Ulsan HD. It was also Sundowns's first victory for an African side after Egypt’s Al Ahly drew their opener while Esperance of Tunisia lost to Flamengo. On 21 June 2025, Rayners scored his second goal in FIFA Club World Cup, making him the first South African player to score two goals in one FIFA Club World Cup tournament.

== International career ==
Rayners was named to the South Africa squad for the 2026 FIFA World Cup.

== Career statistics ==
=== International goals ===
Scores and results list South Africa's goal tally first.

No.	Date	Venue	Opponent	Score	Result	Competition
1.	8 July 2023	King Zwelithini Stadium, Durban, South Africa	Botswana	1–1	2–1	2023 COSAFA Cup
2.	26 March 2024	Nelson Mandela Stadium, Algiers, Algeria	Algeria	3–2	3–3	2024 FIFA Series
3.	11 June 2024	Free State Stadium, Bloemfontein, South Africa	Zimbabwe	1–0	3–1	2026 FIFA World Cup qualification
4.	11 October 2024	Nelson Mandela Bay Stadium, Gqeberha, South Africa	Congo	5–0	5–0	2025 Africa Cup of Nations qualification
5.	19 November 2024	Cape Town Stadium, Cape Town, South Africa	South Sudan	1–0	3–0	2025 Africa Cup of Nations qualification
6.	30 September 2026	Al Salam Stadium, Cairo, Egypt	Eritrea	4–0	5–0	2027 Africa Cup of Nations qualification

== Honours ==
Stellenbosch

- Carling Knockout Cup: 2023

Mamelodi Sundowns

- CAF Champions League: 2025–26; runner-up: 2024–25
- South African Premiership: 2024–25
- MTN 8: 2026

Individual

- Nedbank Cup Player of the Tournament: 2022–23
