= 2024–25 South African Premiership =

Football league season

Premiership
- Season: 2024–25
- Dates: 14 September 2024 – 29 May 2025
- Champions: Mamelodi Sundowns (15th title)
- Relegated: Cape Town City; Royal AM (expelled)
- Champions League: Mamelodi Sundowns; Orlando Pirates
- Confederation Cup: Kaizer Chiefs; Stellenbosch
- Matches: 210
- Goals: 423 (2.01 per match)
- Top goalscorer: Lucas Ribeiro Costa (16 goals)
- Biggest home win: Orlando Pirates 8-1 Marumo Gallants (24 December 2024)
- Biggest away win: AmaZulu 0-5 Stellenbosch (23 January 2025)
- Highest scoring: Orlando Pirates 8-1 Marumo Gallants (24 December 2024)
- Longest winning run: 7 Matches: Orlando Pirates
- Longest unbeaten run: 7 Matches: Orlando Pirates
- Longest winless run: 3 Matches; Marumo Gallants
- Longest losing run: 3 Matches; Marumo Gallants
- Highest attendance: 100,000; Orlando Pirates v Kaizer Chiefs (1 February 2025)
- All statistics correct as of 19 June 2026.

The 2024–25 South African Premiership was the 29th consecutive season of the South African Premiership. It was known as the Betway Premiership for sponsorship reasons, after the premature end of the sponsorship from the league's previous sponsor, DSTV, and also commonly referred to as the PSL after the governing body. The season started on 14 September 2024 and the league portion concluded in May 2025.

Mamelodi Sundowns won the title for the eighth consecutive year with four games to spare, the streak starting in the 2017-18 season.

In April 2025, the PSL's Board of Governors, consisting of the 15 Premiership teams (excluding Royal AM), and 16 National First Division teams, voted to expel Royal AM from the league. The club had not played any of their fixtures since December 2024 following a preservation order by the South African Revenue Service over unpaid taxes. All of their results in the season until then were expunged from the record.

== Teams ==
=== Team changes ===
▲ Promoted from 2023–24 National First Division

- Magesi

▼ Relegated to 2024–25 National First Division

- Cape Town Spurs

=== Purchased statuses ===
- Marumo Gallants purchased their status from Moroka Swallows

=== Stadiums and locations ===
Stadiums

Location of teams in the 2024–25 Premiership.
Location of teams in the 2024–25 Premiership in Gauteng.
Location of teams in the 2024–25 Premiership in Limpopo.

Team	Location	Stadium	Capacity
AmaZulu	Durban	Moses Mabhida Stadium	55,500
Cape Town City	Cape Town	Cape Town Stadium Athlone Stadium	55,000, 36,000
Chippa United	Gqeberha	Nelson Mandela Bay Stadium	48,459
Golden Arrows	Durban (Hammarsdale)	Mpumalanga Stadium	12,000
Kaizer Chiefs	Johannesburg (Soweto)	FNB Stadium	94,736
Magesi	Polokwane	Old Peter Mokaba Stadium	15,000
Mamelodi Sundowns	Pretoria (Marabastad)	Loftus Versfeld Stadium	51,762
Marumo Gallants	Bloemfontein	Dr. Petrus Molemela Stadium	22,000
Orlando Pirates	Johannesburg (Soweto)	Orlando Stadium	37,139
Polokwane City	Polokwane	Old Peter Mokaba Stadium	15,000
Richards Bay	Richards Bay	King Zwelithini Stadium	10,000
Royal AM	Pietermaritzburg	Harry Gwala Stadium	12,000
Sekhukhune United	Polokwane	Peter Mokaba Stadium	45,500
Stellenbosch	Stellenbosch	Danie Craven Stadium	16,000
SuperSport United	Pretoria (Atteridgeville)	Lucas Masterpieces Moripe Stadium	28,900
TS Galaxy	Mbombela	Mbombela Stadium	40,929

== League table ==
Pos	Team	Pld	W	D	L	GF	GA	GD	Pts	Qualification or relegation
1	Mamelodi Sundowns (C)	28	24	1	3	65	13	+52	73	Qualification for 2025–26 CAF Champions League
2	Orlando Pirates	28	19	4	5	43	20	+23	61	Qualification for 2025–26 CAF Champions League
3	Stellenbosch	28	13	9	6	34	21	+13	48	Qualification for 2025–26 CAF Confederation Cup
4	Sekhukhune United	28	13	7	8	39	31	+8	46	
5	TS Galaxy	28	8	11	9	30	30	0	35	
6	AmaZulu	28	10	5	13	29	34	−5	35	
7	Polokwane City	28	8	10	10	19	25	−6	34	
8	Richards Bay	28	9	6	13	19	26	−7	33	
9	Kaizer Chiefs	28	8	8	12	25	32	−7	32	Qualification for 2025–26 CAF Confederation Cup
10	Marumo Gallants	28	8	8	12	26	39	−13	32	
11	Chippa United	28	8	7	13	22	28	−6	31	
12	Golden Arrows	28	7	10	11	20	32	−12	31	
13	Magesi	28	8	7	13	19	31	−12	31	
14	SuperSport United	28	6	9	13	18	30	−12	27	
15	Cape Town City (R)	28	7	6	15	15	31	−16	27	Qualification for Playoffs
16	Royal AM (D, R)	0	0	0	0	0	0	0	0	Expelled from the league

Source: Premier Soccer League
(C) Champions; (D) Disqualified; (R) Relegated

== Results ==
Each team plays each other twice (30 matches each), once at home and once away.

Home \ Away	AMA	CTC	CHI	KZC	GDA	MAG	MDS	MRG	ORL	PLK	RBU	ROY	SEK	STL	SSU	TSG
AmaZulu	—	2–0	2–0	1–3	0–0	3–0	0–1	2–0	1–1	1–1	1–0	~~2–1~~ (Note: Results voided as all Royal AM matches were suspended.)	0–2	0–5	2–1	1–2
Cape Town City	0–1	—	0–2	1–0	1–1	0–0	0–2	0–1	1–0	1–0	2–1	~~Canc.~~ (Note: Matches cancelled as Royal AM was suspended.)	1–2	0–0	1–0	1–1
Chippa United	2–1	0–1	—	0–0	2–0	2–0	0–3	2–2	0–1	2–0	1–0	~~Canc.~~	0–1	0–2	0–0	2–1
Kaizer Chiefs	2–2	0–0	1–0	—	0–1	1–0	1–2	1–2	1–2	0–0	2–1	~~2–2~~	1–0	2–1	1–4	1–1
Golden Arrows	0–1	3–2	0–0	2–1	—	0–1	1–1	2–0	1–2	0–0	0–1	~~Canc.~~	3–2	0–3	0–0	1–1
Magesi	0–1	2–0	1–4	2–2	1–0	—	1–2	1–1	0–1	0–2	1–0	~~0–0~~	1–1	1–0	1–0	2–1
Mamelodi Sundowns	2–0	3–0	3–0	1–0	4–0	2–0	—	4–1	4–1	2–0	3–0	~~2–1~~	3–0	3–0	2–0	4–1
Marumo Gallants	1–0	1–0	1–1	1–2	1–1	3–1	1–3	—	2–0	0–0	0–0	~~Canc.~~	1–2	0–1	1–1	1–1
Orlando Pirates	2–1	2–1	2–1	1–0	3–0	1–1	2–1	8–1	—	3–0	1–0	~~Canc.~~	0–1	0–1	2–0	1–1
Polokwane City	2–1	0–2	1–0	2–0	0–1	0–1	1–0	1–0	0–1	—	3–1	~~Canc.~~	1–1	1–1	1–1	1–1
Richards Bay	1–3	1–0	0–0	2–0	0–0	0–0	0–2	2–1	0–1	2–0	—	~~Canc.~~	2–1	0–0	0–1	1–0
Royal AM	~~Canc.~~	~~1–1~~	~~Canc.~~	~~Canc.~~	~~2–3~~	~~Canc.~~	~~Canc.~~	~~Canc.~~	~~Canc.~~	~~0–1~~	~~0–0~~	—	~~2–0~~	~~Canc.~~	~~Canc.~~	~~1–3~~
Sekhukhune United	4–2	1–0	1–1	1–1	2–0	1–0	2–4	1–0	1–2	2–0	2–0	~~Canc.~~	—	1–2	1–1	1–3
Stellenbosch	1–0	3–0	1–0	0–1	0–2	2–1	0–1	1–0	0–0	1–1	1–1	~~Canc.~~	1–1	—	2–1	1–1
SuperSport United	0–0	0–0	2–0	1–0	1–1	1–0	0–3	0–1	0–1	0–1	0–2	~~0–0~~	0–3	1–1	—	1–0
TS Galaxy	1–0	2–0	1–0	1–1	2–0	0–0	1–0	1–2	0–2	0–0	0–1	~~Canc.~~	1–1	2–3	3–1	—

Source: Flashscore
Legend: Blue = home team win; Yellow = draw; Red = away team win.

== Statistics ==
=== Top scorers ===
Rank	Player	Club	Goals
1	(Brazil) Lucas Ribeiro Costa	Sundowns	16
2	(South Africa) Iqraam Rayners	Sundowns	14
3	(South Africa) Devin Titus	Stellenbosch	8
3	(Bosnia and Herzegovina) Dženan Zajmović	TS Galaxy	8
3	(Brazil) Arthur de Oliviera Sales	Sundowns	8

=== Clean sheets ===
As of 31 March 2025

Rank	Player	Club	Clean Sheets	Minutes played
1	(Zimbabwe) Elvis Chipezeze	Magesi F.C	11	1980
2	(South Africa) Sipho Chaine	Orlando Pirates	10	1710
3	(Ivory Coast) Badra Ali Sangare	Sekhukhune United	7	1890
4	(Equatorial Guinea) Manuel Sapunga	Polokwane City	7	1530
5	(South Africa) Ronwen Williams	Mamelodi Sundowns	7	1228

== See also ==
- 2024–25 National First Division
