= Stellenbosch F.C. =

South African association football club

- Full name: Stellenbosch Football Club
- Nicknames: Stellies; The Maroons
- Founded: 3 August 2016; 10 years ago
- Ground: Danie Craven Stadium, Stellenbosch
- Capacity: 16,000
- Coach: Gavin Hunt
- League: South African Premiership
- 2025–26: 9th of 16
- Website: stellenboschfc.com
Home colours	Away colours

Active departments of Stellenbosch F.C.
- Football (Men's): Football (Women's)

Stellenbosch Football Club is a professional football club based in Stellenbosch, South Africa. Founded in 2016 following the relocation of Vasco da Gama F.C. to Stellenbosch, the club is the first Premier Soccer League team from the Cape Winelands region and was promoted to the South African Premiership in 2019. The first team plays its home matches at the Danie Craven Stadium.

The club won the National First Division in 2019, earning promotion to the top-flight for the first time in the process, and the 2023 Carling Knockout Cup, which saw the team become the inaugural champions of the revamped competition. Stellenbosch has also twice competed in the continental CAF Confederation Cup and reached the semi-final stage of the competition in the club's first appearance during the 2024-25 season.

== History ==
Stellenbosch Football Club was formed in August 2016 when the Premier Soccer League Executive Committee approved the application from National First Division side, Vasco Da Gama for a name change following the club's relocation from Parow to the Stellenbosch Academy of Sport (SAS) in Stellenbosch.

Sammy Troughton was appointed as head coach and Stellies' first National First Division match was played on 28 August 2016 when the team suffered a 3–1 loss to Mthatha Bucks, with Stanley Muishond scoring the club's first-ever goal during the encounter. The club ended its maiden season in third position on the log standings, clinching the final promotion/relegation playoff spot by one point, but ultimately missed out on promotion during the subsequent mini league.

Following an unsuccessful attempt to gain promotion, the club parted ways Troughton and replaced him with Steve Barker, who had previously been appointed as an assistant coach mid-way through the season. The team subsequently recorded a split record of 10 wins, 10 draws, and 10 losses to finish eighth in the league, thereby failing to qualify for the playoffs. This ultimately led to a change in ownership in August 2018 when the Stellenbosch Academy of Sport, owned by billionaire Johann Rupert's Remgro, purchased the club to usher in a new era.

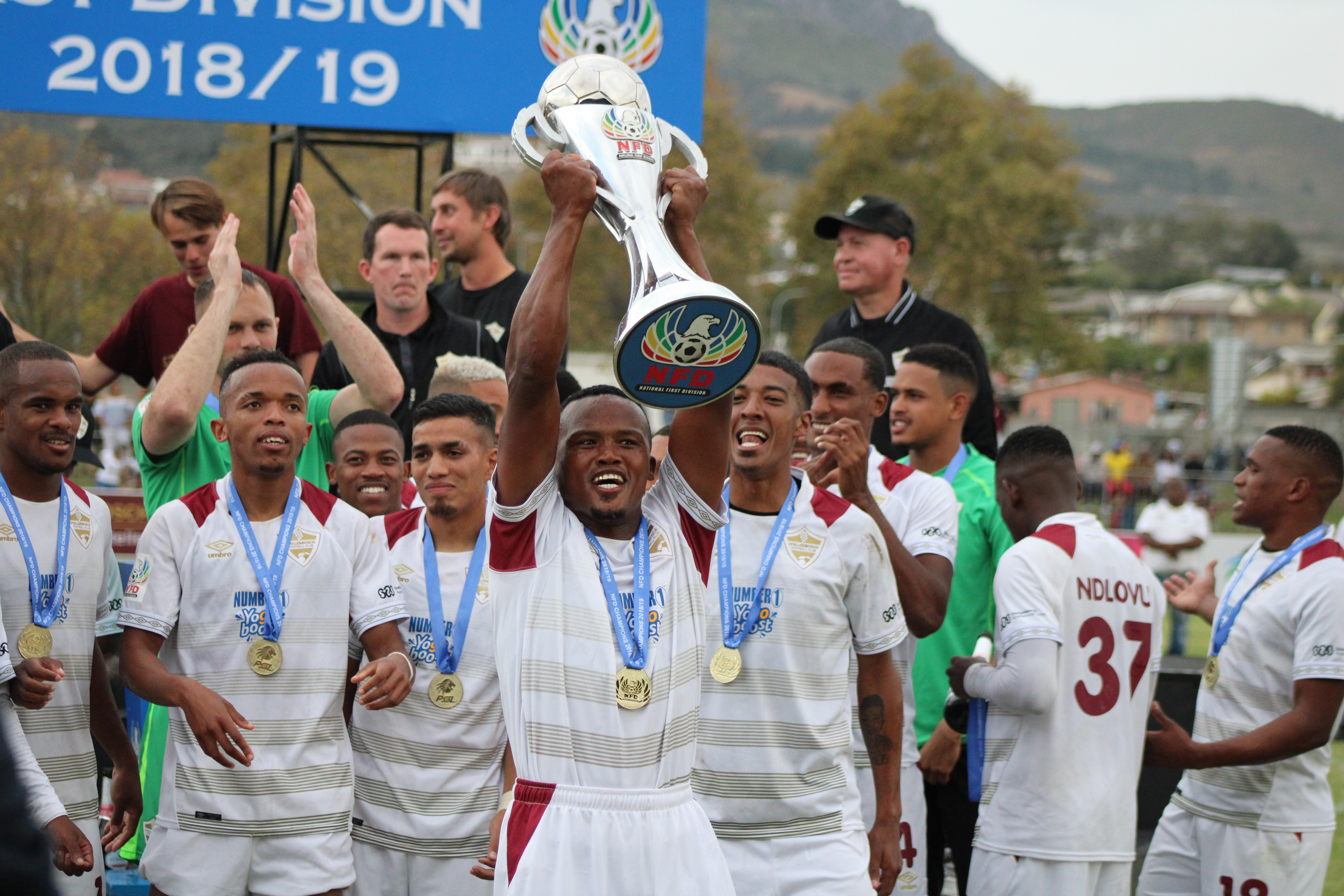
Angelo Kerspuy of Stellenbosch F.C. lifts the 2018–19 National First Division trophy.

The following season, Barker's side secured promotion to the Premiership, the top-flight of South African football, as champions of the National First Division after recording a 0–0 draw against Maccabi FC on the final day of the campaign. Stellenbosch commenced their maiden Premiership campaign with a goalless draw against Chippa United, before going on to end the season in 10th position during a year that was interrupted and affected by the COVID-19 pandemic.

The following season, the club began playing home matches at the Danie Craven Stadium, traditionally used for rugby, where it has played the majority of its fixtures since, alternating on occasion with Athlone Stadium in Cape Town. Stellenbosch then finished 14th in the 2020–21 domestic standings, a club-record 4th in the 2021–22 season, thereby qualifying for the first time to compete in the MTN 8 tournament, and 6th in 2022–23 campaign. In December 2023, the club won its first cup competition after being crowned inaugural Carling Knockout champions following a penalty shootout win over TS Galaxy at the Moses Mabhida Stadium in Durban. In April 2025 Stellenbosch FC made history by reaching the semi-final of the 2024–25 CAF Confederation Cup, defeating Egyptian soccer team Zamalek SC 1–0 in Cairo.

== Name and badge ==
The chief operating officer at the club, Rob Benadie stated "The name 'Stellenbosch FC' shows our intention of creating a club that symbolises the Cape Winelands community. We are on a pathway of building something special‚ and we want to take this community with us." The crest of the club features a bunch of grapes, as Stellenbosch is based within the Cape Winelands District Municipality.

== Current squad ==
As of 21 August 2026

Note: Flags indicate national team as defined under FIFA eligibility rules; some limited exceptions apply. Players may hold more than one non-FIFA nationality.

No.	Pos.	Nation	Player
1	GK	NZL	Nathan Garrow
2	MF	RSA	Kgaogelo Ramushu
4	DF	RSA	Luthando Vena
6	MF	RSA	Tlakusani Mthethwa
8	MF	RSA	Vuyolwethu Andrieas
10	FW	RSA	Ashley Du Preez
11	FW	RSA	Quwan Plaatjies
14	FW	RSA	Sinoxolo Kwayiba
17	GK	RSA	Sage Stephens
19	MF	RSA	Genino Palace
20	MF	RSA	Keanan Johannesen
21	DF	RSA	Gopolang Taunyana
22	DF	RSA	Qobolwakhe Sibande
24	MF	RSA	Orlando Mbembe

No.	Pos.	Nation	Player
26	DF	RSA	Siviwe Nkwali
27	DF	RSA	Terrence Mashego
28	FW	RSA	Lehlogonolo Matlou
30	DF	RSA	Sphiwe Msimango
31	DF	RSA	Darrel Matsheke
32	FW	RSA	Raoul Daniels
33	MF	RSA	Chumani Butsaka
35	MF	RSA	Njabulo Blom (on loan from Borneo Samarinda)
36	FW	RSA	Wonderboy Makhubu
37	DF	RSA	Thabiso Lebitso
67	FW	RSA	Bradley Grobler
77	FW	RSA	Shakeel April
—	DF	RSA	Surprise Nhlabathi

=== Recent loan movements ===
- Ashley Cupido joined Israeli second-tier club Kiryat Yam on a season-long loan in July 2026.
- Faiz Abrahams joined Israeli Liga Leumit club Hapoel Kfar Saba on a season-long loan in July 2025. He made 11 league appearances, scoring three goals and providing three assists, before returning to Stellenbosch in February 2026.He subsequently joined Kaizer Chiefs on loan for the 2026–27 season.
- Muzomuhle Khanyi joined Chippa United on a season-long loan for the 2026–27 campaign in June 2026.
- Turan Manafov returned to Azerbaijan to join Gabala FC on loan for the remainder of the 2025–26 season in January 2026.

== Club officials ==
=== Stellenbosch Football Club ===
- CEO: Rob Benadie
- General Manager: Jason Rhoda
- Head of Media: Liam Bekker

=== Coaching and medical staff ===
- Head coach: Gavin Hunt
- Assistant coach: Wesley Sergel
- Team manager: Angelo Kerspuy
- First-team goalkeeping coach: Pernell McKop
- First-team performance coach: Menanto de Lange
- First-team physiotherapist: Fanie de Klerk
- First team kit manager: Tshepo Nombula
- Academy director: Jean-Pierre Farrugia
- Reserve team coach: Evangelos Vellios

== Honours ==
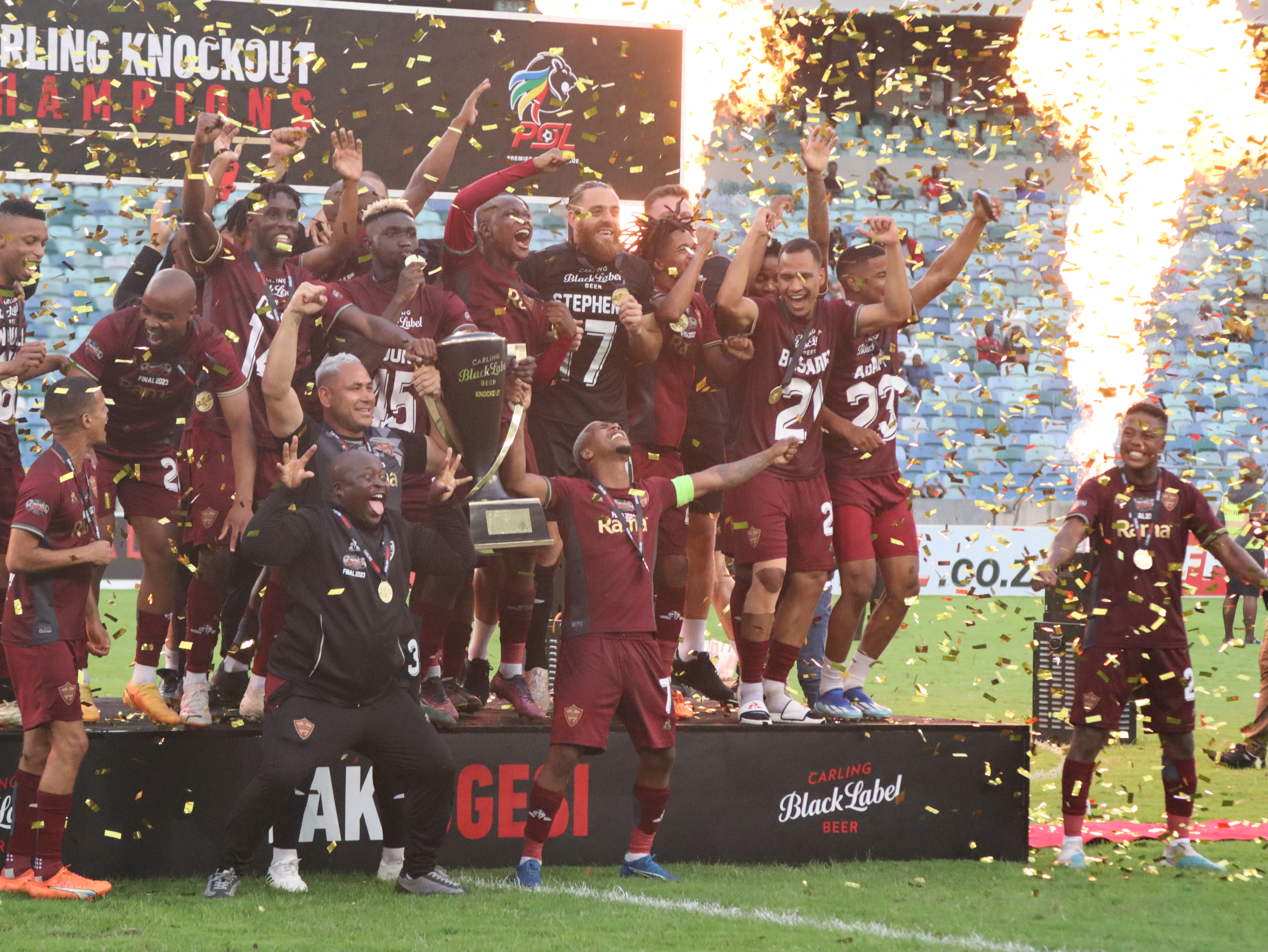
Stellenbosch FC celebrate winning the 2023 Carling Knockout trophy.

=== First team ===
- National First Division
  - Winners (1): 2018–19
- Carling Knockout Cup
  - Winners (1): 2023
- MTN 8
  - Runners-up (2): 2024, 2025

=== Reserves (U-23) ===
- DStv Diski Challenge
  - Winners (2): 2021–22, 2023–24
- Premier League Next Gen Cup
  - Winners (2): 2022, 2024
  - Runners-up (1): 2023

=== League record ===
==== National First Division ====
- 2016–17 – 3rd
- 2017–18 – 8th
- 2018–19 – 1st (promoted)

==== Premiership ====
- 2019–20 – 10th
- 2020–21 – 14th
- 2021–22 – 4th
- 2022–23 – 6th
- 2023–24 – 3rd
- 2024–25 – 3rd
- 2025–26 – 9th

== Player of the Year ==
Year	Winner
2019	(South Africa) Iqraam Rayners
2020	(South Africa) Robyn Johannes
2021	(South Africa) Deano van Rooyen
2022	(South Africa) Zitha Kwinika
2023	(Argentina) Júnior Mendieta
2024	(South Africa) Iqraam Rayners (2)
2025	(South Africa) Fawaaz Basadien
