= 2023 Carling Knockout Cup =

Tournament details
- Country: South Africa
- Dates: 21 October 2023 – 16 December 2023
- Teams: 16

Final positions
- Champions: Stellenbosch
- All statistics correct as of 17 December 2023.

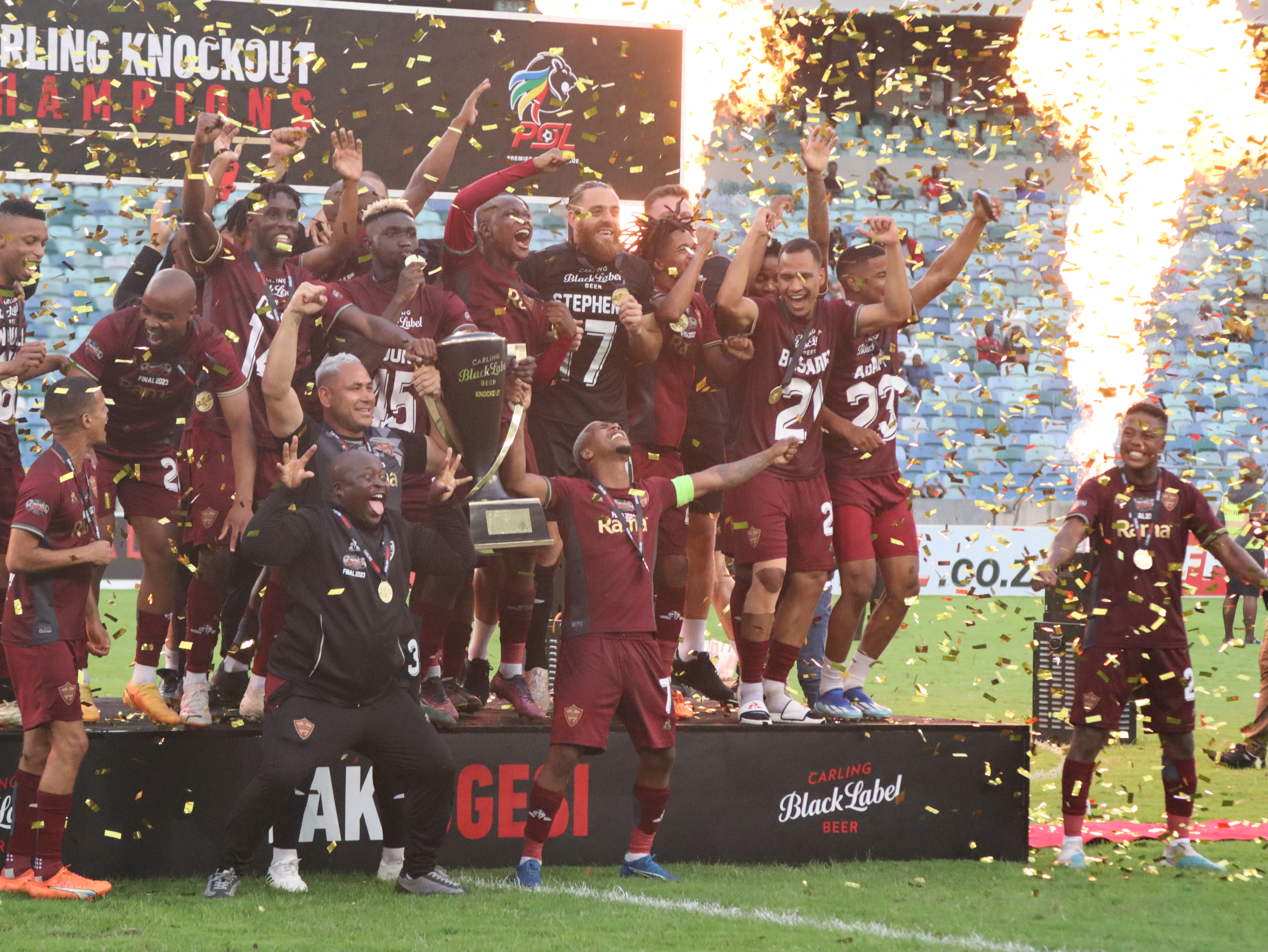
Stellenbosch FC players celebrate winning the 2023 Carling Knockout trophy

The 2023 Carling Knockout Cup was the first season of the South African association football competition, the Carling Knockout Cup, under its new sponsored name. It was organised by the Premier Soccer League and Carling and ran from 21 October 2023 to 16 December 2023.

This competition replaced the Telkom knockout. Because this competition was sponsored by Carling Black Label, the Carling Black Label Cup was merged with this competition and was played by 16 teams instead of only 4. There were 2 trophies to be won, the second being the Carling Cup Match, an All-Stars match played on 6 January 2024.

== Teams ==
The teams consisted of the 16 teams from the 2023–24 South African Premiership.

- AmaZulu
- Cape Town City
- Cape Town Spurs
- Chippa United
- Golden Arrows
- Kaizer Chiefs
- Mamelodi Sundowns
- Moroka Swallows
- Orlando Pirates
- Polokwane City
- Royal AM
- Richards Bay
- Sekhukhune United
- Stellenbosch
- SuperSport United
- TS Galaxy

== Round of 16 ==
18 October 2023
19:30

TS Galaxy	2–2 (a.e.t.)	Mamelodi Sundowns
Mahlangu 13'; Vidal 16'	Report	Allende 57'; Sirino 98'
Penalties
	5–4

Mbombela Stadium, Mbombela
20 October 2023
19:30

Orlando Pirates	2–0	Cape Town Spurs
Xoki 60'; Erasmus 64'	Report

Orlando Stadium, Soweto

21 October 2023	Golden Arrows	v	Cape Town City	Mpumalanga
15:00 SAST		Report		Stadium: Mpumalanga Stadium

21 October 2023	Chippa United	v	Stellenbosch	Gqeberha
15:00 SAST		Report		Stadium: Nelson Mandela Bay Stadium

21 October 2023	Kaizer Chiefs	v	AmaZulu	Soweto
18:00 SAST		Report		Stadium: FNB Stadium

21 October 2023	Sekhukhune	v	Royal AM	Polokwane
20:15 SAST		Report		Stadium: Peter Mokaba Stadium

22 October 2023	Richards Bay	v	Moroka Swallows	Durban
15:00 SAST		Report		Stadium: King Zwelithini Stadium

22 October 2023	Supersport United	v	Polokwane City	Pretoria
18:00 SAST		Report		Stadium: Lucas Masterpieces Moripe Stadium

== Final ==
16 December 2023

Stellenbosch	1–1 (a.e.t.)	TS Galaxy
	Report
Penalties
	5–4

Moses Mabhida Stadium, Durban

== Carling Cup Match ==
6 January 2024	Carling Stars 2	v	Stellenbosch 1	Polokwane
TBC SAST		Report		Stadium: Peter Mokaba Stadium
