= PSL Footballer of the Year =

The PSL Footballer of the Year in South African football is awarded to the most outstanding player of the season across the domestic league, the South African Premier Division, and the three major cup competitions, the MTN 8, the Telkom Knockout and the Nedbank Cup.

== Winners ==
Season	Footballer	Club	Position	Nationality
2025–26	Relebohile Mofokeng	Orlando Pirates	MF	South Africa
2024–25	Lucas Ribeiro Costa	Mamelodi Sundowns	FW	Brazil
2023–24	Ronwen Williams	Mamelodi Sundowns	GK	South Africa
2022–23	Teboho Mokoena	Mamelodi Sundowns	MF	South Africa
2021–22	Peter Shalulile (2)	Mamelodi Sundowns	FW	Namibia
2020–21	Peter Shalulile	Mamelodi Sundowns	FW	Namibia
2019–20	Themba Zwane	Mamelodi Sundowns	MF	South Africa
2018–19	Thembinkosi Lorch	Orlando Pirates	MF	South Africa
2017–18	Percy Tau	Mamelodi Sundowns	MF	South Africa
2016–17	Lebogang Manyama	Cape Town City	MF	South Africa
2015–16	Khama Billiat	Mamelodi Sundowns	MF	Zimbabwe
2014–15	Tefu Mashamaite	Kaizer Chiefs	DF	South Africa
2013–14	Sibusiso Vilakazi	Bidvest Wits	MF	South Africa
2012–13	Itumeleng Khune	Kaizer Chiefs	GK	South Africa
2011–12	Siyabonga Nomvethe	Moroka Swallows	FW	South Africa
2010–11	Thulani Serero	Ajax Cape Town	MF	South Africa
2009–10	Morgan Gould	Supersport United	DF	South Africa
2008–09	Teko Modise (2)	Orlando Pirates	MF	South Africa
2007–08	Teko Modise	Orlando Pirates	MF	South Africa

== See also ==
- PSL Awards
- PSL Player of the Season
- PSL Players' Player of the Season
- Lesley Manyathela Golden Boot
