= 2017–18 National First Division =

National First Division
- Season: 2017–18
- Champions: Highlands Park
- Promoted: Highlands Park; Black Leopards
- Relegated: Mthatha Bucks; Super Eagles F.C.
- Matches: 240
- Goals: 547 (2.28 per match)

The 2017–18 National First Division was the season from August 2017 to May 2018 of South Africa's second tier of professional soccer, the National First Division.

== League table ==
Pos	Team	Pld	W	D	L	GF	GA	GD	Pts	Promotion, qualification or relegation
1	Highlands Park	30	21	6	3	65	13	+52	69	Promotion to 2018–19 South African Premiership
2	Black Leopards	30	14	8	8	42	21	+21	50	Qualification to Promotion play-offs
3	Jomo Cosmos	30	14	7	9	46	35	+11	49	Qualification to Promotion play-offs
4	Real Kings F.C.	30	11	12	7	34	25	+9	45	
5	Witbank Spurs	30	11	12	7	35	30	+5	45	
6	Tshakhuma Tsha Madzivhandila (Note: The league license for Milano United F.C. was purchased by ABC Motsepe franchise Tshakhuma Tsha Madzivhandila F.C. after the fixtures had been announced but before the fixtures had taken place.)	30	11	8	11	32	44	−12	41	
7	Cape Town All Stars	30	9	13	8	29	26	+3	40	
8	Stellenbosch F.C.	30	10	10	10	29	36	−7	40	
9	Royal Eagles	30	8	12	10	40	41	−1	36	
10	University of Pretoria	30	9	9	12	35	46	−11	36	
11	Uthongathi	30	7	13	10	21	25	−4	34	
12	Richards Bay (Note: The first season for Richards Bay F.C., the club was created following the sale of the league license to AmaZulu F.C.)	30	8	10	12	27	40	−13	34	
13	Mbombela United	30	10	6	14	28	40	−12	36	
14	Ubuntu Cape Town (Note: The first season for Ubuntu Cape Town F.C., the club was created following the purchase of the league license of F.C. Cape Town)	30	7	11	12	31	38	−7	32	
15	Super Eagles F.C.	30	7	11	12	26	40	−14	32	Relegation to 2018–19 SAFA Second Division
16	Mthatha Bucks	30	4	10	16	27	47	−20	22	Relegation to 2018–19 SAFA Second Division

Updated to match(es) played on unknown. Source: https://www.soccerladuma.co.za/league/south-african-national-first-division/table
Rules for classification: 1) Points; 2) Goal difference; 3) Number of goals scored;

== Playoffs ==
Pos	Lge	Team	Pld	W	D	L	GF	GA	GD	Pts	Promotion or relegation
1	NFD	Black Leopards (P)	4	2	2	0	6	4	+2	8	Promotion to 2018–19 South African Premier Division
2	NFD	Jomo Cosmos	4	1	2	1	4	4	0	5	
3	PRE	Platinum Stars (R)	4	0	2	2	3	5	−2	2	Relegation to 2018–19 National First Division

Updated to match(es) played on unknown. Source:
Rules for classification: 1) Points; 2) Goal difference; 3) Number of goals scored;
(P) Promoted; (R) Relegated
16 May 2018

Black Leopards	1–0	Platinum Stars
Nange 65'	Report

Thohoyandou Stadium, Thohoyandou
20 May 2018

Jomo Cosmos	2–2	Black Leopards
Mgunda 17'; Tlolane 90+2'	Report	Musonda 13', 62'

Vosloorus Stadium, Johannesburg
23 May 2018

Platinum Stars	0–0	Jomo Cosmos
	Report

Moruleng Stadium, Moruleng
26 May 2018

Platinum Stars	2–2	Black Leopards
Koapeng 23', 84'	Report	Musonda 51', 87'

Moruleng Stadium, Moruleng
30 May 2018

Black Leopards	1–0	Jomo Cosmos
Tshepe 25'	Report

Thohoyandou Stadium, Thohoyandou
2 June 2018

Jomo Cosmos	2–1	Platinum Stars
Hlongwane 11'; Tlolane 90+2'	Report	Koapeng 46'

Vosloorus Stadium, Johannesburg

== See also ==
- 2017-18 South African Premier Division
- 2017-18 Nedbank Cup
