= Ledwaba =

Ledwaba is a surname. Notable people with the surname include:

- Dolly Ledwaba, South African politician
- Jackie Ledwaba, South African soccer player and coach
- Lehlo Ledwaba (1971–2021), South African boxer
- Nokuthula Ledwaba (born 1983), South African actress
- Refilwe Ledwaba (born 1980), South African helicopter pilot
