= Lesley Manyathela Golden Boot =

- Awarded for: The leading goalscorer in a given Premiership season
- Country: South Africa
- Presented by: Premier Soccer League
- First award: 1997; 29 years ago
- Final award: 2026
- Currently held by: Junior Dion (1st award)

Highlights
- Most wins: Peter Shalulile (3)

The Lesley Manyathela Golden Boot is an annual association football award presented by the Premier Soccer League to the leading goalscorer in the South African Premiership. The award, colloquially known as the PSL Golden Boot or simply the Golden Boot, has been presented since the inception of the post-apartheid format of the league in 1996. It was named in 2003 in honour of Lesley Manyathela, a South African international footballer and former recipient of the award who died in a motor vehicle collision in August of that year.

Wilfred Mugeyi was the first recipient of the award after he scored 22 goals for Bush Bucks in the inaugural Premiership season. He is one of five players to have scored 20 or more goals in a season alongside Pollen Ndlanya, Collins Mbesuma, Siyabonga Nomvethe and Peter Shalulile. Mbesuma holds the record for the most goals scored in a single campaign following his return of 25 goals for Kaizer Chiefs in the 2004–05 season. He was also the first player to have won the award more than once, having claimed the trophy for a second time during his spell with Mpumalanga Black Aces in 2016, while Shalulile equalled this record in 2022, and broke it the following year. In doing so, the latter also became the only player to have won the award in back-to-back seasons.

Bernard Parker holds the record for the fewest goals needed to win the award, with his return of 10 goals for Kaizer Chiefs in the 2013–14 season earning him the accolade. The award has been shared three times in the Premiership's history, an occurrence which first took place in the 2017–18 season after Rodney Ramagalela of Polokwane City and Percy Tau of Mamelodi Sundowns both ended the campaign on 11 goals. Players from Moroka Swallows and Kaizer Chiefs have won the award the most times, with each club having four unique winners.

== Winners ==
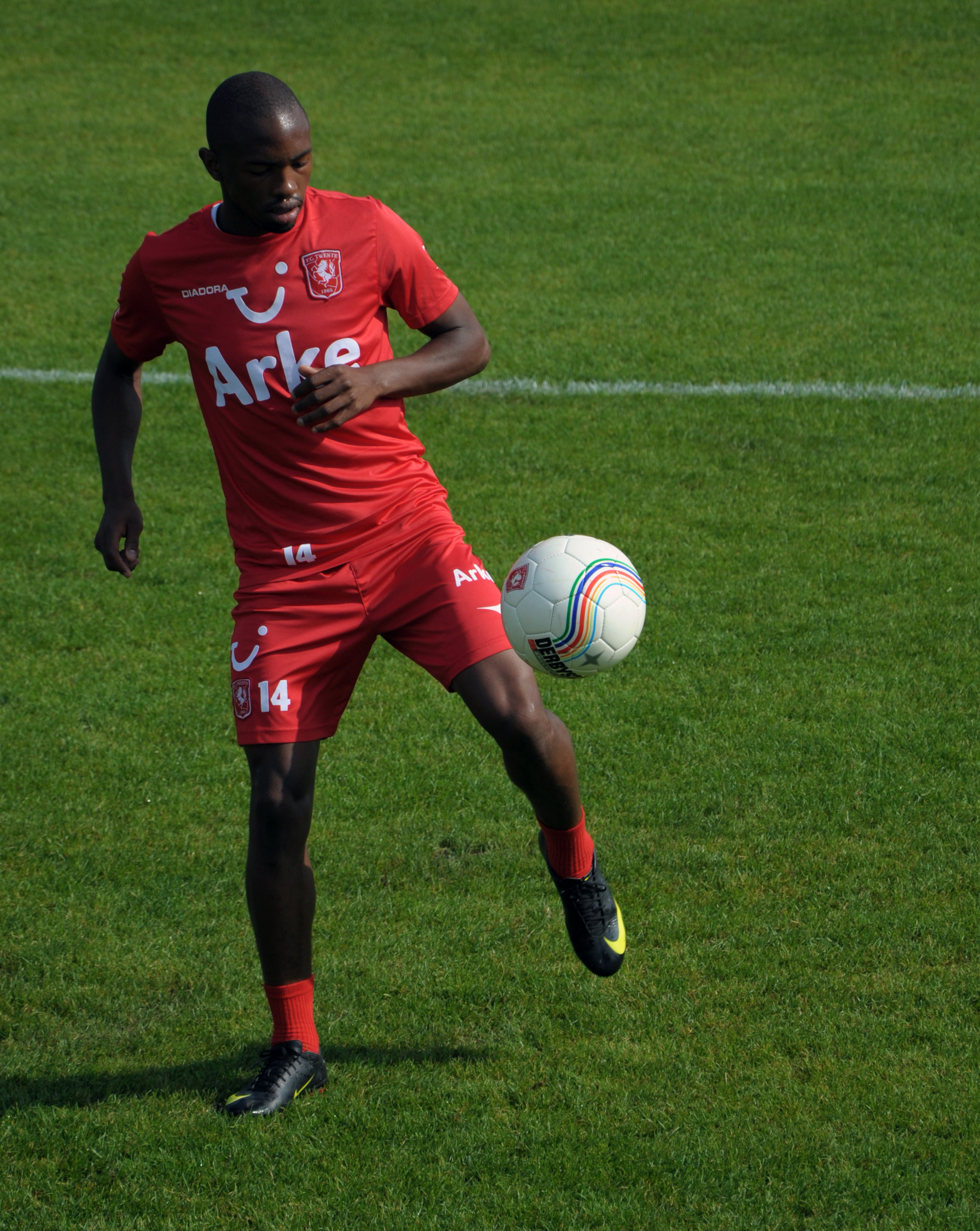
Bernard Parker (pictured here during his time with Dutch side Twente) holds the record for the fewest goals needed to win the award. His tally of 10 goals for Kaizer Chiefs earned him the Golden Boot in 2014.

Key
Player (X)	Name of the player and number of times they had won the award at that point (if more than one)
†	Indicates multiple award winners in the same season
‡	Denotes the club were South African Premiership champions in the same season
§	Denotes the record for the most goals scored in a South African Premiership season
¢	Denotes the record for the fewest goals scored in a South African Premiership season

Lesley Manyathela Golden Boot winners
Season	Player	Nationality	Club	Goals	Ref
1996–97	Wilfred Mugeyi	Zimbabwe	Bush Bucks	22	
1997–98	Keryn Jordan	South Africa	Manning Rangers	11	
1998–99	Pollen Ndlanya	South Africa	Kaizer Chiefs	21	
1999–2000	Dennis Lota	Zambia	Orlando Pirates	18	
2000–01	Gilbert Mushangazhike	Zimbabwe	Manning Rangers	19	
2001–02	Ishmael Maluleke	South Africa	Manning Rangers	18	
2002–03	Lesley Manyathela	South Africa	Orlando Pirates^{‡}	18	
2003–04	Jackie Ledwaba	South Africa	Zulu Royals	14	
2004–05	Collins Mbesuma	Zambia	Kaizer Chiefs^{‡}	25§	
2005–06	Mame Niang	Senegal	Moroka Swallows	14	
2006–07	Christopher Katongo	Zambia	Jomo Cosmos	15	
2007–08	James Chamanga	Zambia	Moroka Swallows	14	
2008–09	Richard Henyekane	South Africa	Golden Arrows	19	
2009–10	Katlego Mphela	South Africa	Mamelodi Sundowns	17	
2010–11	Knowledge Musona	Zimbabwe	Kaizer Chiefs	17	
2011–12	Siyabonga Nomvethe	South Africa	Moroka Swallows	20	
2012–13	Katlego Mashego	South Africa	Moroka Swallows	13	
2013–14	Bernard Parker	South Africa	Kaizer Chiefs	10¢	
2014–15	Moeketsi Sekola	South Africa	Free State Stars	14	
2015–16	Collins Mbesuma (2)	Zambia	Mpumalanga Black Aces	14	
2016–17	Lebogang Manyama	South Africa	Cape Town City	13	
2017–18^{†}	Rodney Ramagalela	South Africa	Polokwane City	11	
2017–18^{†}	Percy Tau	South Africa	Mamelodi Sundowns^{‡}	11	
2018–19	Mwape Musonda	Zambia	Black Leopards	16	
2019–20^{†}	Gabadinho Mhango	Malawi	Orlando Pirates	16	
2019–20^{†}	Peter Shalulile	Namibia	Highlands Park	16	
2020–21	Bradley Grobler	South Africa	SuperSport United	16	
2021–22	Peter Shalulile (2)	Namibia	Mamelodi Sundowns^{‡}	23	
2022–23^{†}	Peter Shalulile (3)	Namibia	Mamelodi Sundowns^{‡}	12	
2022–23^{†}	Khanyisa Mayo	South Africa	Cape Town City	12	
2023–24	Tshegofatso Mabasa	South Africa	Orlando Pirates	16	
2024–25	Lucas Ribeiro Costa	Brazil	Mamelodi Sundowns^{‡}	16	
2025–26	Junior Dion	Chad	Golden Arrows	14	

== Awards won by nationality ==
Country	Total
South Africa	17
Zambia	6
Namibia	3
Zimbabwe	3
Brazil	1
Chad	1
Malawi	1
Senegal	1

== Awards by club ==
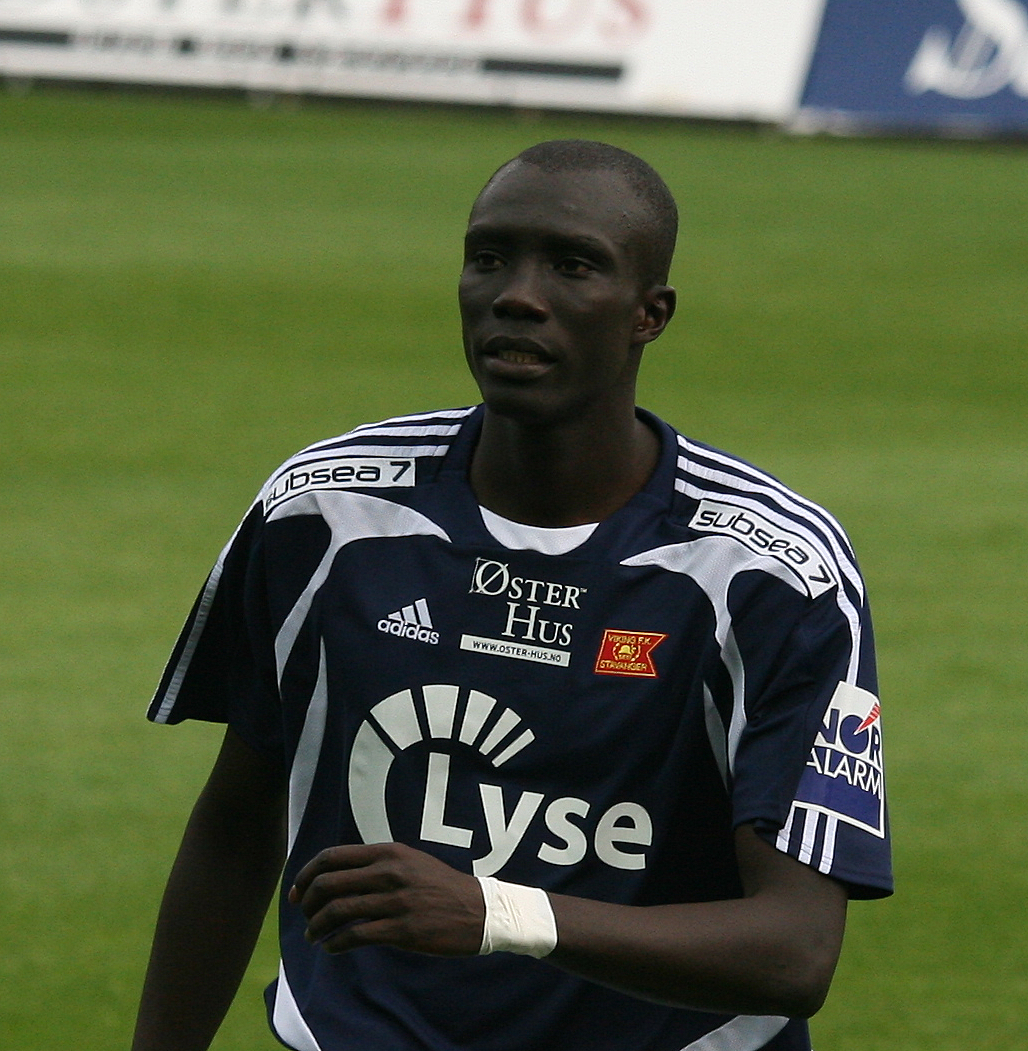
Mame Niang (pictured here during his time with Norwegian side Viking) is one of four Moroka Swallows players to have won the Golden Boot award.

Club	Total
Mamelodi Sundowns	5
Moroka Swallows	4
Kaizer Chiefs	4
Orlando Pirates	4
Manning Rangers	3
Orlando Pirates	3
Cape Town City	2
Golden Arrows	2
Black Leopards	1
Bush Bucks	1
Free State Stars	1
Highlands Park	1
Jomo Cosmos	1
Mpumalanga Black Aces	1
Polokwane City	1
SuperSport United	1
Zulu Royals	1
