= Bernard Parker =

South African soccer player (born 1986)

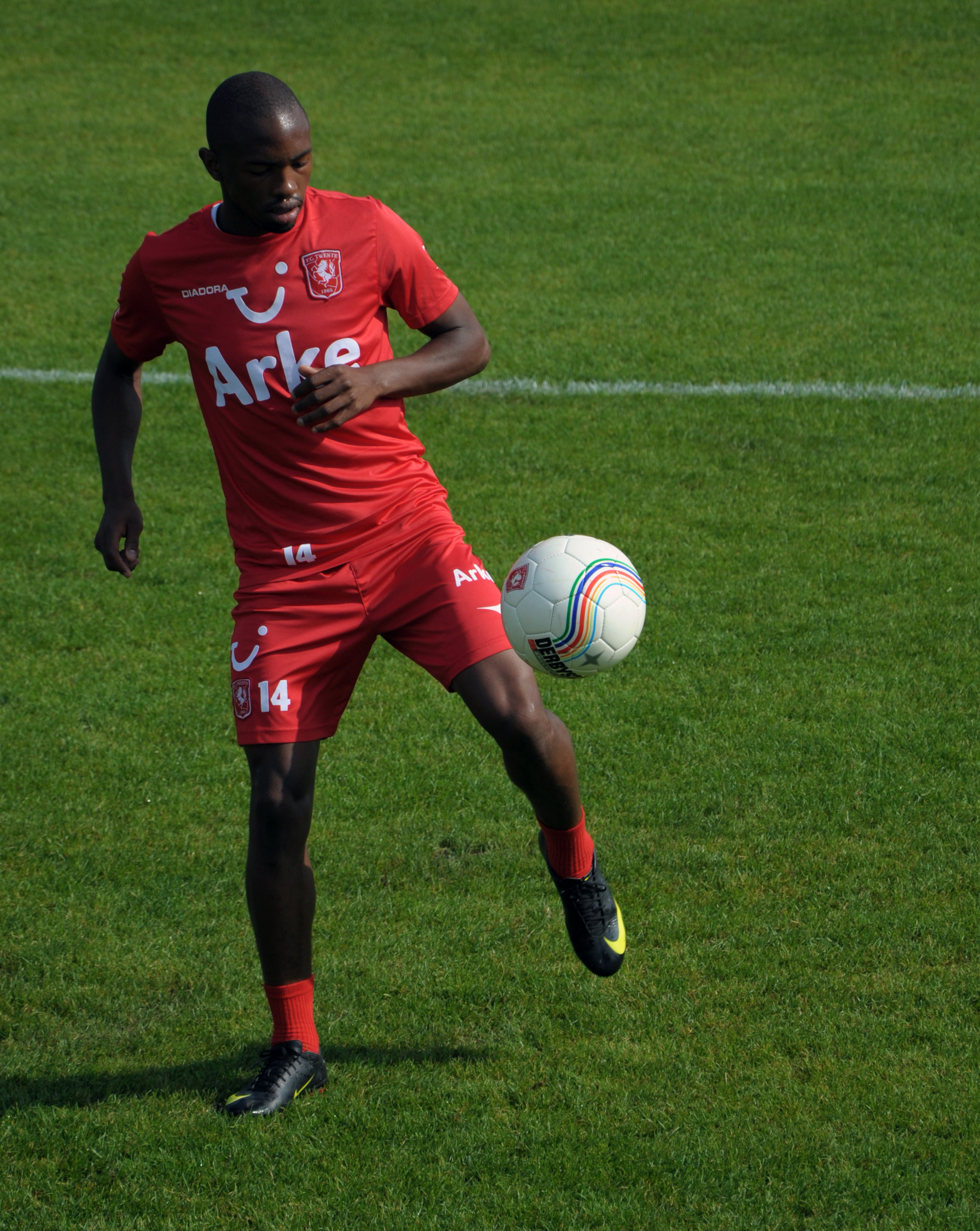
- Parker with FC Twente in 2009

Personal information
- Full name: Bernard Melvin Parker
- Date of birth: 16 March 1986 (age 40)
- Place of birth: Boksburg, South Africa
- Height: 1.70 m (5 ft 7 in)
- Positions: Attacking midfielder; forward

Youth career
- Transnet School of Excellence
- Mamelodi Sundowns

Senior career*
Years	Team	Apps	(Gls)
2004–2009	Thanda Royal Zulu	116	(29)
2009	→ Red Star Belgrade	16	(6)
2009–2011	FC Twente	17	(0)
2011	→ Panserraikos (loan)	12	(1)
2011–2022	Kaizer Chiefs	283	(49)
2022–2024	TS Galaxy	34	(3)
Total		478	(88)

International career
2006–2008	South Africa U23	22	(12)
2007–2015	South Africa	73	(23)

Managerial career
- 2024–2026: TS Galaxy reserves
- 2026: TS Galaxy
- * Club domestic league appearances and goals

Bernard Parker (born 16 March 1986) is a South African soccer manager and former player who most recently managed TS Galaxy.

A midfielder or forward, Parker started his professional football career playing for Thanda Royal Zulu in the Premier Soccer League, where he made 70 appearances before a one-year loan to Serbian SuperLiga side Red Star Belgrade. He joined Eredivisie side FC Twente in 2009, where he spent a season and a half before being loaned out to Panserraikos in the Greek Super League. During his time in the Eredivisie, Parker won the 2009–10 Eredivisie and the 2010 Johan Cruyff Shield.

He moved to Kaizer Chiefs in 2011. He was awarded the 2013–14 Lesley Manyathela Golden Boot and won two league titles, the Nedbank Cup and the MTN 8 with the South African club. Parker was released by Kaizer Chiefs in June 2022 after spending over a decade at the club, making over 350 appearances and scoring over 60 goals.

Between 2007 and 2015 he made 73 appearances for the South Africa national team scoring 23 goals.

== Early life ==
Parker was born and grew up in Reiger Park, a township next to Boksburg, Gauteng. He was quite good in a variety of sports and excelled in short and long-distance running as well as achieving Eastern Gauteng colours in swimming.

== Club career ==
A product of the School of Excellence, Parker made his debut in the professional ranks for Cape Town's Hellenic FC, later bought and renamed Benoni Premier United. After the club was once again renamed and moved to Durban he remained with Thanda Royal Zulu F.C. until early 2009 when he obtained a transfer to European Cup Winners Red Star in Serbia. His stay in Belgrade was cut short after reports that the club had cash flow problems and owed its players' salaries.

Parker signed with FC Twente in July 2009 and was a member of the team that won the Dutch 2009–10 Eredivisie. After Twente manager Steve McClaren's move to Bundesliga, Parker failed to convince new coach Michel Preud'homme of his qualities and thus spent the first half of the 2010–11 Dutch season mostly on the bench. He joined Leicester City on trial in December 2010 with a view to a permanent move away from the Dutch club. On 18 January 2011, he moved to Panserraikos F.C. on loan, to secure extra game time and returned to FC Twente after the end of the 2010–11 season.

After receiving interest from Swedish clubs Malmö FF and Helsingborgs IF as well as South Africa's Kaizer Chiefs, Parker chose the latter ahead of the other clubs. In the 2012–13 season, Parker scored 12 league goals in 28 matches and finished as runner up to Katlego Mashego who had 13 and helped Chiefs to a league and cup double. The following season, he won the Lesley Manyathela Golden Boot with 10 goals.

After Parker spent over a decade at Kaizer Chiefs, the club decided not to renew his contract that was to expire on 30 June 2022. He scored over 60 goals in 350 appearances there.

In August 2022 Parker joined TS Galaxy on a two-year contract.

On 18 October 2023, Parker suffered a broken leg from a "nightmare challenge" by Mamelodi Sundowns player Bongani Zungu during a Round Of 16 match in the 2023 Carling Knockout Cup between TS Galaxy and Mamelodi Sundowns at Mbombela Stadium.

In July 2024 Parker announced his retirement from playing.

== International career ==
Parker had his South Africa national team debut against Malawi in 2007, scoring his first goal in 2008 against the same team. On 17 June 2009, he scored both goals in a 2–0 win over New Zealand in the 2009 Confederations Cup, and also received the Man of the Match award. He played in 2010 FIFA World Cup representing South Africa but the team was eliminated after group stage. He also played in 2013 African Cup of Nations hosted in South Africa.

On 16 June 2013, Parker scored an own goal in a 2–1 defeat to Ethiopia which ended South Africa's chances of qualifying for the 2014 World Cup. Earlier in the match he had given South Africa a 1–0 lead. Parker also scored by chipping the ball over Víctor Valdés in the 56th minute in a 1–0 shock win over the then-world and European champions Spain at Soccer City, where it won the World Cup in 2010. Parker won the top goalscorer award at the 2014 African Nations Championship with four goals from three group matches.

== Managerial career ==
Parker was appointed head coach of the TS Galaxy reserves, playing in the PSL Reserve League, ahead of the 2024–25 season. On 2 June 2026, he was unveiled as the new TS Galaxy first team coach.However later that year TS Galaxy reshuffled their technical team and had reportedly offered him a role as their DDC team, which he rejected, meaning that he would leave TS Galaxy as a whole. His departure coincided with the news that he and his wife, Kacha Stepanovic, were separating.

== Personal life ==
Parker married Wendy Cherry in Ballito, KwaZulu-Natal, on 16 June 2012 at a ceremony attended by 170 guests.

== Career statistics ==
=== Club ===
Appearances and goals by club, season and competition
Club	Season	League			National cup		League cup		Continental		Other		Total	
Club	Season	Division	Apps	Goals	Apps	Goals	Apps	Goals	Apps	Goals	Apps	Goals	Apps	Goals
Thanda Royal Zulu	2006–07	Premier Soccer League	28	5									28	5
Thanda Royal Zulu	2007–08	Premier Soccer League	28	5									28	5
Thanda Royal Zulu	2008–09	Premier Soccer League	14	10	0	0							14	10
Thanda Royal Zulu	Total		70	20									70	20
Red Star Belgrade (loan)	2008–09	Serbian Superliga	16	6	0	0	–		0	0			16	6
FC Twente	2009–10	Eredivisie	14	0	5	2	–		6	0	–		25	2
FC Twente	2010–11	Eredivisie	3	0	3	1	–		0	0	1 (Note: Appearance in Johan Cruyff Shield)	0	7	1
FC Twente	Total		17	0	8	3	0	0	6	0	1	0	32	3
Panserraikos (loan)	2010–11	Super League Greece	12	1			–		0	0			12	1
Kaizer Chiefs	2011–12	Premier Soccer League	28	3	1	0	0	0			4 (Note: Appearance(s) in MTN 8)	1	33	4
Kaizer Chiefs	2012–13	Premier Soccer League	28	12	5	1	1	1			1	0	35	14
Kaizer Chiefs	2013–14	Premier Soccer League	27	10	3	0	3	0			3	1	36	11
Kaizer Chiefs	2014–15	South African Premier Division	24	7	0	0	2	1			1	0	27	8
Kaizer Chiefs	2015–16	South African Premier Division	26	2	1	0	3	0			4	2	34	4
Kaizer Chiefs	2016–17	South African Premier Division	24	5	2	0	1	0			1	0	28	5
Kaizer Chiefs	2017–18	South African Premier Division	24	4	4	1	3	1			1	0	32	6
Kaizer Chiefs	2018–19	South African Premier Division	26	2	5	1	3	0			3	0	37	3
Kaizer Chiefs	2019–20	South African Premier Division	27	0	2	0	3	0			0	0	32	0
Kaizer Chiefs	2020–21	South African Premier Division	25	0	1	0	0	0	13	1	3	0	42	1
Kaizer Chiefs	2021–22	South African Premier Division	24	4	1	0	0	0	0	0	1	1	26	5
Kaizer Chiefs	Total		283	49	25	3	19	3	13	1	22	5	362	61
TS Galaxy	2022-23	South African Premier Division	25	3	0	0	0	0	0	0	0	0	25	3
TS Galaxy	2023-24	South African Premier Division	9	0	1	0	0	0	0	0	0	0	10	0
TS Galaxy	Total		34	3	1	0	0	0	0	0	0	0	35	3
Career total			432	79	34	6	19	3	19	1	23	5	527	94

=== International ===
Appearances and goals by national team and year
National team	Year	Apps	Goals
South Africa	2007	5	0
South Africa	2008	7	4
South Africa	2009	14	3
South Africa	2010	10	3
South Africa	2011	7	0
South Africa	2012	5	2
South Africa	2013	17	7
South Africa	2014	4	4
South Africa	2015	4	0
Total		73	23

Scores and results list South Africa's goal tally first, score column indicates score after each Parker goal.

List of international goals scored by Bernard Parker
No.	Date	Venue	Opponent	Score	Result	Competition
1	30 September 2008	Driehoek Stadium, Germiston, South Africa	Malawi	1–0	3–0	Friendly
2	30 September 2008	Driehoek Stadium, Germiston, South Africa	Malawi	2–0	3–0	Friendly
3	15 October 2008	Seisa Ramabodu Stadium, Bloemfontein, South Africa	Ghana	2–1	2–1	Friendly
4	19 November 2008	Royal Bafokeng Stadium, Phokeng, South Africa	Cameroon	3–2	3–2	Friendly
5	28 March 2009	Royal Bafokeng Stadium, Phokeng, South Africa	Norway	1–0	2–1	Friendly
6	17 June 2009	Royal Bafokeng Stadium, Phokeng, South Africa	New Zealand	1–0	2–0	2009 FIFA Confederations Cup
7	17 June 2009	Royal Bafokeng Stadium, Phokeng, South Africa	New Zealand	2–0	2–0	2009 FIFA Confederations Cup
8	16 May 2010	Mbombela Stadium, Nelspruit, South Africa	Thailand	4–0	4–0	Friendly
9	31 May 2010	Peter Mokaba Stadium, Polokwane, South Africa	Guatemala	5–0	5–0	Friendly
10	4 September 2010	Mbombela Stadium, Nelspruit, South Africa	Niger	2–0	2–0	2012 Africa Cup of Nations qualification
11	11 September 2012	Mbombela Stadium, Nelspruit, South Africa	Mozambique	1–0	2–0	Friendly
12	11 September 2012	Mbombela Stadium, Nelspruit, South Africa	Mozambique	2–0	2–0	Friendly
13	23 March 2013	Cape Town Stadium, Cape Town, South Africa	Central African Republic	2–0	2–0	2014 FIFA World Cup qualification
14	8 June 2013	Stade Ahmadou Ahidjo, Yaoundé, Cameroon	Central African Republic	1–0	3–0	2014 FIFA World Cup qualification
15	16 June 2013	Addis Ababa Stadium, Addis Ababa, Ethiopia	Ethiopia	1–2	1–2	2014 FIFA World Cup qualification
16	7 September 2013	Moses Mabhida Stadium, Durban, South Africa	Botswana	3–1	4–1	2014 FIFA World Cup qualification
17	7 September 2013	Moses Mabhida Stadium, Durban, South Africa	Botswana	4–1	4–1	2014 FIFA World Cup qualification
18	10 September 2013	Orlando Stadium, Soweto, South Africa	Zimbabwe	1–2	1–2	Friendly
19	19 November 2013	Soccer City, Johannesburg, South Africa	Spain	1–0	1–0	Friendly
20	11 January 2014	Cape Town Stadium, Cape Town, South Africa	Mozambique	1–0	3–1	2014 African Nations Championship
21	11 January 2014	Cape Town Stadium, Cape Town, South Africa	Mozambique	3–1	3–1	2014 African Nations Championship
22	15 January 2014	Cape Town Stadium, Cape Town, South Africa	Mali	1–0	1–1	2014 African Nations Championship
23	19 January 2014	Cape Town Stadium, Cape Town, South Africa	Nigeria	1–3	1–3	2014 African Nations Championship

== Honours ==
FC Twente

- Eredivisie: 2009–10
- Johan Cruijff Schaal: 2010

Kaizer Chiefs

- Premier Soccer League: 2012–13, 2014–15
- Nedbank Cup: 2012–13
- MTN 8: 2015

Individual

- Lesley Manyathela Golden Boot: 2013–14
- African Nations Championship Golden Boot: 2014
