= Mame Niang =

Senegalese footballer

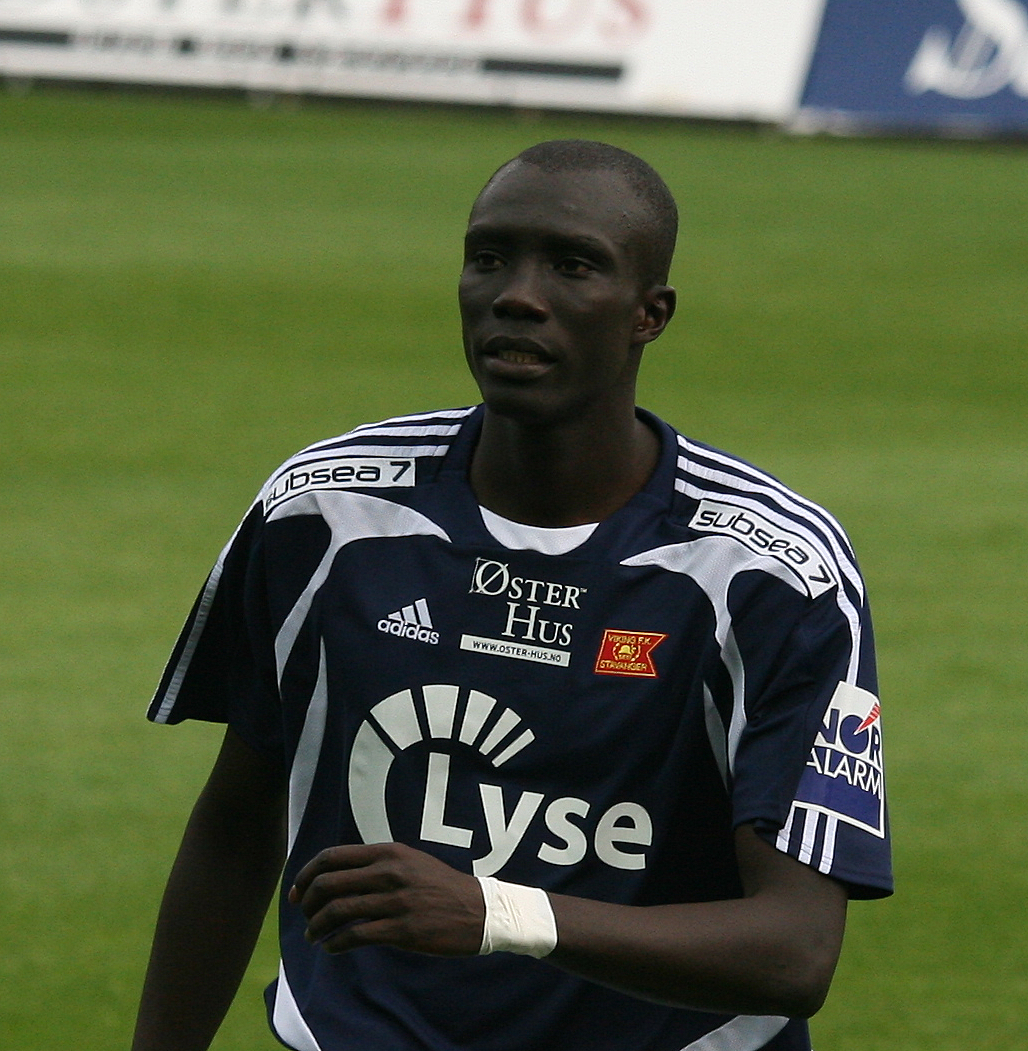

Personal information
- Full name: Mame Cheikh Niang
- Date of birth: 31 March 1984 (age 42)
- Place of birth: Dakar, Senegal
- Height: 1.94 m (6 ft 4 in)
- Position: Striker

Youth career
- ASC Niayes
- CSS

Senior career*
Years	Team	Apps	(Gls)
2004–2005	ASC Diaraf		
2005–2007	Moroka Swallows		
2007–2008	VfL Wolfsburg	4	(0)
2008–2010	Viking	31	(6)
2010–2011	Kongsvinger	27	(4)
2011–2012	SuperSport United	12	(2)
2012–2013	University of Pretoria	25	(10)
2013–2014	SuperSport United	21	(5)
2014–2016	Mamelodi Sundowns	8	(1)
2015–2016	→ AEL Limassol (loan)	13	(1)
2016	Kongsvinger	12	(3)
2017	Stellenbosch	10	(5)
2017	Kongsvinger	0	(0)
2017–2018	Royal Eagles	11	(2)
2018	Tuks FC	12	(3)
- * Club domestic league appearances and goals as of 21:25, 26 January 2019 (UTC)

Mame Cheikh Niang (born 31 March 1984) is a Senegalese former professional footballer who played as a striker.

He won the 2005–06 PSL Lesley Manyathela Golden Boot award as top goalscorer with 14 goals while playing for Moroka Swallows in South Africa.

== Career statistics ==
Season	Club	Division	League		Cup		Total	
Season	Club	Division	Apps	Goals	Apps	Goals	Apps	Goals
2007–08	Wolfsburg	Bundesliga	4	0	-	-	4	0
2008	Viking	Tippeligaen	9	4	0	0	9	4
2009	Viking	Tippeligaen	22	2	2	0	24	2
2010	Kongsvinger	Tippeligaen	27	4	4	1	31	5
2011–12	SuperSport United	South African Premier Division	12	2	-	-	12	2
2012–13	University of Pretoria	South African Premier Division	25	10	-	-	25	10
2013–14	SuperSport United	South African Premier Division	21	5	-	-	21	5
2015–16	AEL Limassol	Cypriot First Division	13	1	-	-	13	1
2016	Kongsvinger	OBOS-ligaen	10	3	3	0	13	3
2016-17	Stellenbosch F.C.	National First Division	4	0	-	-	4	0
2017-18	Royal Eagles F.C.	National First Division	9	0	2	2	2	2
2018-19	University of Pretoria	National First Division	11	3	1	0	12	3
Career Total			184	31	14	3	197	44
