= Luthando Mateza =

South African footballer

Personal information
- Date of birth: 8 February 1998 (age 28)
- Position: Midfielder

Youth career
- –2016: Ajax Cape Town

Senior career*
Years	Team	Apps	(Gls)
2016–2018	Ajax Cape Town	2	(0)
2020–	Steenberg United	4	(0)
- * Club domestic league appearances and goals as of 16:40, 17 January 2021 (UTC)

Luthando Mateza (born 8 February 1998) is a South African soccer player who plays as a midfielder for Steenberg United.

== Career statistics ==
As of 17 January 2021

Appearances and goals by club, season and competition
Club	Season	League			National Cup		League Cup		Other		Total	
Club	Season	Division	Apps	Goals	Apps	Goals	Apps	Goals	Apps	Goals	Apps	Goals
Ajax Cape Town	2016–17	Absa Premiership	2	0	0	0	0	0	0	0	2	0
Ajax Cape Town	2017–18	Absa Premiership	0	0	0	0	0	0	0	0	0	0
Steenberg United	2020–21	National First Division	4	0	0	0	0	0	0	0	4	0
Career total			6	0	0	0	0	0	0	0	6	0
