= Lesley Manyathela =

South African soccer player (1981-2003)

Personal information
- Full name: Lesley Phuti Manyathela
- Date of birth: 4 September 1981
- Place of birth: Musina, South Africa
- Date of death: 9 August 2003 (aged 21)
- Place of death: Musina, South Africa
- Position: Striker

Youth career
- Chelamoya
- Dynamos

Senior career*
Years	Team	Apps	(Gls)
2000–2003	Orlando Pirates	73	(48)

International career
2002–2003	South Africa	9	(3)
- * Club domestic league appearances and goals

Lesley Phuti Manyathela (4 September 1981 – 9 August 2003) was a South African professional soccer player who played as a striker for Premier Soccer League club Orlando Pirates and the South African national team.

Nicknamed "Slow Poison" for his goalscoring prowess, Manyathela scored 48 goals in 73 appearances for Orlando Pirates and was the league's top goalscorer in 2003. Later that year, he was involved in a fatal car accident. Following his death, the PSL named its top scorer award after him, while the national team temporarily retired the number 19 jersey which he had previously worn.

== Club career ==
Having represented Chelamoya and Dynamos at youth level, Manyathela joined Orlando Pirates with whom he made his senior debut in September 2000, at the age of 19. During the 2001–02 PSL season, he ended the campaign as the league's second top goalscorer behind Ishmael Maluleke. The following season, he claimed the Golden Boot award, becoming the second and, to date, most recent Pirates player to win the award, and helped the club to its second league title in three seasons. His domestic form caught the attention of a host of European clubs and at the end of the season he underwent trials with Ligue 1 side Lyon and Greek side OFI Crete. On 9 August 2003, he scored a consolation goal in a 2–1 Supa 8 loss to Jomo Cosmos. The goal proved to be his last, though, as following the match, he died. He ultimately made 73 appearances for the club and scored 48 goals.

== International ==
Manyathela represented South Africa at under-20 level, where he scored once in five appearances, and at under-23 level where he scored six goals in 13 appearances.

He made his senior debut for South Africa against Saudi Arabia on 20 March 2002. Seven days later, he received his first and only red card when he was sent off in a 4–1 friendly loss to Georgia. His first goal came in a friendly against Madagascar in March 2003 which he followed up with a brace in a 3–1 win over Trinidad & Tobago in June. After his death later that year, the South African Football Association temporarily retired the number 19 jersey which he had worn during his time with the national team. He had scored 3 goals in 9 international appearances by the time of his demise.

== Death and legacy ==
On 9 August 2003, immediately after the loss to Jomo Cosmos in which he scored, Manyathela was en route to visit his mother for Women's Day celebrations when his Volkswagen Golf Mk4 overturned on the N1 highway near his hometown of Musina, killing him. It was reported that he did not wear his safety belt, leading to the car's airbags not deploying. He was driving with a friend at the time of the accident, who suffered only minor injuries.

Manyathela's death was considered a national tragedy and drew comment from South African President Thabo Mbeki, who offered condolences to his family, friends and teammates. He was laid to rest on 16 August 2003, with Orlando Pirates chairman Irvin Khoza and Mamelodi Sundowns owner Patrice Motsepe among the pallbearers. His tombstone was unveiled the following month, precisely on Heritage Day.

Ahead of the 2003–04 Premier Soccer League season, the league's top goalscorer award was renamed after Manyathela. The Musina municipality's stadium is also named in his honour.

== Career statistics ==
=== International ===
As of match played 14 June 2003

Appearances and goals by national team and year
National team	Year	Apps	Goals
South Africa	2002	5	0
South Africa	2003	4	3
Total		9	3

==== International goals ====
#	Date	Venue	Opponent	Score	Result	Competition
1.	29 March 2003	First National Bank Stadium, Johannesburg, South Africa	Madagascar	2–0	Win	Friendly
2.	14 June 2003	Basil Kenyon Stadium, East London, South Africa	Trinidad and Tobago	2–1	Win	Friendly
3.	14 June 2003	Basil Kenyon Stadium, East London, South Africa	Trinidad and Tobago	2–1	Win	Friendly
