= Mogau Tshehla =

South African soccer player (1992–2018)

Personal information
- Full name: Mogau Trinity Tshehla
- Date of birth: 25 January 1992
- Date of death: 12 February 2018 (aged 26)
- Position: Right back

Senior career*
Years	Team	Apps	(Gls)
2012–2017	Witbank Spurs	98	(6)
2017–2018	Polokwane City	6	(0)
Total		104	(6)
- * Club domestic league appearances and goals

Mogau Trinity Tshehla (25 January 1992 – 12 February 2018) was a South African professional soccer player who played at right back for Witbank Spurs and Polokwane City.

Tshehla was killed in an automobile accident on 12 February 2018. His brother was fellow footballer Percy Tau.
