= Siyabonga Nomvethe =

South African former soccer player (born 1977)

Personal information
- Full name: Siyabonga Eugene Nomvethe
- Date of birth: 2 December 1977 (age 48)
- Place of birth: Durban, South Africa
- Height: 1.78 m (5 ft 10 in)
- Position: Forward

Youth career
- Sabatha FC
- Durban Cosmos
- 1994–1997: Claremont Blizzards

Senior career*
Years	Team	Apps	(Gls)
1997–1998	African Wanderers	28	(11)
1998–2001	Kaizer Chiefs	79	(42)
2001–2005	Udinese	19	(0)
2004	→ Salernitana (loan)	17	(2)
2004–2005	→ Empoli (loan)	10	(0)
2005	→ Djurgården (loan)	5	(1)
2006	Orlando Pirates	14	(4)
2006–2009	AaB	68	(13)
2009–2016	Moroka Swallows	149	(53)
2016–2019	AmaZulu	70	(28)
2020	Uthongathi	4	(0)
Total		459	(154)

International career
1999–2012	South Africa	81	(16)

Managerial career
- 2020–: AmaZulu (assistant)
- * Club domestic league appearances and goals

Siyabonga Eugene Nomvethe (/nɒmˈvɛteɪ/; born 2 December 1977) is a South African former professional soccer player who played as a forward.

Nomvethe played in several European leagues. Nomvethe represented the South Africa national team from his debut on 6 May 1999, and he played in the 2002 and 2010 World Cups. He is the second highest all-time goal scorer in the PSL after Peter Shalulile.

== Biography ==
Nomvethe was born in the township of KwaMashu north of Durban in the KwaZulu-Natal province of South Africa.

== Club career ==
Nomvethe started playing as a striker for the Durban-based lower league club Durban Cosmos in 1994, from which he moved to Claremont Blizzards.

=== African Wanderers ===
When Claremont Blizzards folded the following year, Nomvethe moved to African Wanderers in the second best South African league. He helped the club secure promotion and Nomvethe made his first appearances in the Premier Soccer League, playing alongside later Bafana Bafana striker Sibusiso Zuma and Phumlani Mkhize. In his debut season, he scored a brace against Chiefs.

=== Kaizer Chiefs ===
In July 1998, he moved on to become a part of the striking force of Kaizer Chiefs. Following 42 goals in 79 games for Kaizer Chiefs, Nomvethe moved abroad in 2001. He was then already touted as a coming star for the Bafana Bafana. Nomvethe made his debut on 8 August 1998 and scored in a 2–1 loss to Bloemfontein Celtic. He injured himself and was out of action for a few months; he did come back later on that season and scored a total of eight goals. Nomvethe was put in place of Pollen Ndlanya who left the team and score 22 goals in all competition including three in the BobSave Super Bowl to help Chiefs win their first silverware of the new millennium. He scored 11 goals on either half of the season and scored Chiefs first goal of the millennium on 8 January 2000 against his old team African Wanderers. He scored 18 goals in all competitions the next season scoring his tenth against Ria Stars on 21 January 2001. He scored his last goal on 24 April 2001 in a 5–0 win over Bloemfontein Celtic in a BobSave Super Bowl quarter final in the 65th minute which was his 58th for Chiefs.

=== Udinese ===
He signed with Italian club Udinese Calcio of the Serie A. In 2002, he was selected to play for South Africa at the 2002 FIFA World Cup. He made his presence clear when scoring the winning goal of the 1–0 win against Slovenia. Following two unsuccessful years at Udinese, Nomvethe was loaned out to smaller Italian clubs Salernitana Calcio and Empoli from January 2004 to June 2005. He was subsequently loaned out to Djurgårdens IF in Sweden, which he joined in August 2005 on a contract until the end of the 2005 season. In total, he made five league appearances and scored one goal for the club in the 2005 Allsvenskan. The club running for the title, the goal was the 2–1 goal in a 3–1 win against fellow title contender IFK Göteborg. He then permanently left Udinese in December 2005, moved back to South Africa, signing on for Orlando Pirates.

=== Aalborg BK ===
In July 2006, he once again moved abroad, this time to play for Aalborg Boldspilklub (AaB) in the Danish Superliga. He stayed with AaB for three years, won the 2007–08 Danish Superliga championship with the club, and scored a goal in the penalty shoot-out as AaB was eliminated by Manchester City in the 2008–09 UEFA Cup round of 16.

=== Moroka Swallows ===
In 2009, Nomvethe moved back to South Africa to join Moroka Swallows, rivals of the two soweto giants, Kaizer Chiefs and Orlando Pirates he represented during his domestic career. Nomvethe at the age of 34, won the PSL Footballer of the Year, Absa Player of the Season, Players' Player of the Season and the Lesley Manyathela Golden Boot with 20 goals at the 2011–12 PSL awards which was a total of R600,000.

=== AmaZulu ===
Nomvethe last played for AmaZulu in the Premier Soccer League having joined the team in January 2016. He was the all leading top scorer in the PSL.

== International career ==
Nomvethe received his first cap in 1999 against Trinidad and Tobago, becoming a first team player from 2001 to 2007. He played in the 2002 FIFA World Cup and scored the game's only goal against Slovenia. He also participated at the 2005 Gold Cup & 2006 African Cup of Nations until he lost his place on the national team, and he was not picked for either the 2008 Africa Cup of Nations nor the 2009 Confederations Cup under Joel Santana in South Africa.

But in April 2010, he was called up by Carlos Alberto Parreira for the friendly matches against Korea DPR and Jamaica. Nomvethe scored South Africa's second in a 2–0 victory over Jamaica, with what was his first international goal in three. He was selected for South Africa's squad for the 2010 FIFA World Cup, and came off the bench as a substitute to play against France in South Africa's third and last game at the tournament.

He scored 16 goals for South Africa.

== Coaching career ==
On 17 December 2020, it was announced that Siyabonga would be joining AmaZulu as an assistant coach to Benni McCarthy. This is his first coaching position.

== Personal life ==
Nomvethe married his childhood sweetheart, Nompumelelo "Mpumi" Ngubane-Mpanza (b. 1980) on 6 July 2002 in a secret Zulu traditional wedding ceremony at KwaMashu D-section township outside Durban which was attended only by relatives and a few people from the local community. A week later, Mpanza faked a kidnapping plot and lied to the police in order to get his attention. Nomvethe and the police later found out that Mpanza had lied in order to go overseas to live with Nomvethe and according to the police, Mpanza was scared Nomvete would dump her and the baby for other girls in Italy. A local police spokesperson, superintendent Percy Mthembu, confirmed Mpanza was being investigated for obstructing the course of justice after she became unco-operative during their investigation. The angry star even threatened to kill the writer of a City Press article and said "I don't want to spill blood, but I will be forced to. Kuzophuma isidumbu ngalendaba. I'm telling you," he vowed. In February 2002, extortionists attempted to kidnap Mpanza and her baby Lifa twice at Inanda.

== Career statistics ==
Scores and results list South Africa's goal tally first, score column indicates score after each Nomvethe goal.

List of international goals scored by Siyabonga Nomvethe
No.	Date	Venue	Opponent	Score	Result	Competition
1	27 November 1999	Pretoria, South Africa	Sweden	1–0	1–0	Nelson Mandela Challenge
2	6 February 2000	Kumasi, Ghana	Ghana	1–0	1–0	2000 Africa Cup of Nations
3	12 February 2000	Accra, Ghana	Tunisia	2–1	2–2	2000 Africa Cup of Nations
4	29 April 2000	Rustenburg, South Africa	Mauritius	3–0	3–0	2000 COSAFA Cup
5	25 February 2001	Blantyre, Malawi	Malawi	2–0	2–1	2002 FIFA World Cup qualification
6	30 January 2002	Ségou, Mali	Morocco	3–0	3–1	2002 Africa Cup of Nations
7	8 June 2002	Daegu, South Korea	Slovenia	1–0	1–0	2002 FIFA World Cup
8	22 June 2003	Polokwane, South Africa	Ivory Coast	2–1	2–1	2004 Africa Cup of Nations qualification
9	11 October 2003	Potchefstroom, South Africa	Costa Rica	1–0	2–1	Nelson Mandela Challenge
10	18 January 2004	Dakar, Senegal	Senegal	1–0	1–2	Friendly match
11	27 January 2004	Sfax, Tunisia	Benin	1–0	2–0	2004 Africa Cup of Nations
12	27 January 2004	Sfax, Tunisia	Benin	2–0	2–0	2004 Africa Cup of Nations
13	10 July 2005	Los Angeles, United States	Jamaica	3–2	3–3	2005 CONCACAF Gold Cup
14	12 November 2005	Port Elizabeth, South Africa	Senegal	2–2	2–3	Nelson Mandela Challenge
15	2 June 2007	Durban, South Africa	Chad	4–0	4–0	2008 Africa Cup of Nations qualification
16	28 April 2010	Durban, South Africa	Jamaica	2–0	2–0	Friendly match

== Honours ==
Djurgårdens IF

- Allsvenskan: 2005

AaB

- Danish Superliga: 2007–08

Moroka Swallows

- Nedbank Cup: 2009
- MTN 8: 2012

Individual

- PSL Footballer of the Year: 2011–12
- PSL Player of the Season: 2011–12
- PSL Players' Player of the Season: 2011–12
- Lesley Manyathela Golden Boot: 2011–12 (20 goals)
