= Tebogo Tlolane =

South African soccer player

Personal information
- Date of birth: 21 December 1994 (age 31)
- Place of birth: Johannesburg, South Africa
- Height: 1.70 m (5 ft 7 in)
- Positions: Left-back; left midfielder

Team information
- Current team: Golden Arrows
- Number: 6

Senior career*
Years	Team	Apps	(Gls)
2016–2018	Jomo Cosmos	36	(6)
2018–2019	Chippa United	29	(3)
2019–2023	Orlando Pirates	5	(0)
2020	→ Maritzburg United (loan)	11	(2)
2020–2021	→ Maritzburg United (loan)	25	(2)
2023	→ Maritzburg United (loan)	3	(0)
2023–	Golden Arrows	10	(0)

International career^{‡}
2023–	South Africa	4	(0)
- * Club domestic league appearances and goals as of 1 August 2024 ‡ National team caps and goals as of 20 September 2023

Tebogo Tlolane (born 21 December 1994) is a South African soccer player who plays as a striker or left midfielder for South African Premier Division side Golden Arrows.

== Club career ==
Born in Johannesburg, Tlolane started his career at Jomo Cosmos but was released by the club in 2018, and went on to join Chippa United. In the summer of 2019, he signed for Orlando Pirates, and made his debut for the club on 20 August 2019 in a 0–0 draw with AmaZulu. In January 2020, Tlolane joined Maritzburg United on loan until the end of the season. In June 2020, the deal was extended for one further season. However, he was recalled in September 2020. In October 2020, he returned to Maritzburg United on a season-long loan. He moved to Golden Arrows in August 2023.

== International career ==
Tlolane was called up for South Africa for the 2023 COSAFA Cup, where he made his international debut.
