= Rodney Ramagalela =

South African soccer player

Personal information
- Full name: Azwitamisi Rodney Ramagalela
- Date of birth: 10 January 1989 (age 37)
- Place of birth: Mamvuka Jazz, South Africa
- Position: Forward

Youth career
- Mamvuka Disco 5
- Phungo All Stars

Senior career*
Years	Team	Apps	(Gls)
2009–2013	Black Leopards	51	(13)
2013–2016	Mamelodi Sundowns	19	(3)
2015–2016	→ Golden Arrows (loan)	20	(2)
2016–2019	Polokwane City	73	(23)
2019–2020	Highlands Park	15	(3)
2020–2021	Black Leopards	23	(1)
- * Club domestic league appearances and goals as of 20:09, 17 August 2020 (UTC)

Rodney Ramagalela (born 10 January 1989) is a South African professional soccer player who last played as a forward for Premier Soccer League club Black Leopards.

== Career ==
He started his professional career with Black Leopards before having spells with Mamelodi Sundowns and Golden Arrows. In 2016, he joined Polokwane City with whom he won the Lesley Manyathela Golden Boot in 2018, sharing the award with Sundowns' Percy Tau. former mamelodi sundowns player hangs his boots at the age of 35
