= Jackie Ledwaba =

Personal information
- Position: Striker

Team information
- Current team: Magesi (assistant manager)

Senior career*
| Years | Team | Apps | (Gls) |
- Zulu Royals

Managerial career
- 2013–2016: Magesi
- 2017–2022: Phiva Young Stars
- 2022–2023: Magesi
- * Club domestic league appearances and goals

Jackie Ledwaba is a South African soccer coach and former player who is assistant manager of Magesi.

== Playing career ==
Ledwaba played as a striker for Zulu Royals, and was top scorer in the South African Premier Division in the 2003–04 season, the same season the club was relegated. He was also invited to train with the South African national team.

== Coaching career ==
Ledwaba has managed Magesi and Phiva Young Stars. In February 2023 he became assistant manager at Magesi.
