= Refilwe Ledwaba =

South African aviator

- Born: Lenyenye
- Occupation: Pilot
- Organization: Girl Fly in Africa Programme
- Website: https://www.gfpafoundation.org/

Refilwe Ledwaba (born 1980) is South Africa's first female, black helicopter pilot.

== Early life ==
Ledwaba grew up in a single-parent household in Lenyenye, Limpopo and is one of seven children. Her mother worked as a teacher while bringing her children up by herself. Her sisters all went to university. She studied for a BSc at the University of Cape Town in Biochemistry with the intent to become a doctor. However, whilst at university she flew for the first time, and decided to pursue a career in aviation. She began working as cabin crew for South African Airways; while working for them she wrote to over two hundred aviation companies asking them for opportunities to train. The South African Police Force offered to pay for her training and support her wish to become a commercial pilot, so she took them up on their job offer.

== Career ==
Ledwaba is the first black woman from South Africa to fly a helicopter and she is also the first black woman to fly for the South African Police Service (SAPS). She received her pilot's wings on 11 January 2006, aged 26. During her time in SAPS she flew over 2500 hours, recovered dead bodies from remote places and undertook solo reconnaissance missions. She is a qualified fixed wing instructor.

Ledwaba founded the non-profit organisation Girl Fly Africa in Programme to encourage young women into STEM careers, whatever their background. Ledwaba organises the programme for this organisation every year: introducing women into the idea of flying as a career, as well as coding and robotics. It organises lessons and training camps for young women in Botswana, Cameroon and South Africa. As of 2019, over 100,000 young women had participated in GFAP. She credits her upbringing, led by strong women in apartheid South Africa, as inspiration for her success. In 2009 she set up the Southern African Women in Aviation and Aerospace Industry (SAWIA) group, to support women working in aviation. Ledwaba has publicly called for the sector to employ more women, especially women of colour at strategic levels in aviation.

In 2019, Ledwaba was a co-signatory on a letter addressed to The Guardian marking International Women's Day, calling for equality for African women. In the same year she joined the U.S. Department of State's Bureau of Educational and Cultural Affairs' TechWomen programme as a mentee. She also became an Obama Foundation Fellow in 2019. Ledwaba is a Bill & Melinda Gates Foundation Goalkeeper, a role she uses to advocate for women's rights in Africa.

=== Awards ===
2012 - South African Youth Award (Entrepreneur)

2012 - CEO Communication's Most Influential Women in Business and Government (Aviation)

2014 - Young People in International Affairs [YPIA] (Top 35 Africans Under 35)

2015 - CEO Communication's Most Influential Women in Business and Government (Aviation)
