= Karabo Tshepe =

South African soccer player

Personal information
- Date of birth: 27 January 1989 (age 37)
- Place of birth: Randfontein, South Africa
- Height: 1.69 m (5 ft 7 in)
- Position: Midfielder

Team information
- Current team: TS Galaxy

Senior career*
Years	Team	Apps	(Gls)
2011–2016	Black Leopards	32	(4)
2016–2017	Magesi	7	(0)
2017–2020	Black Leopards	49	(8)
2020–2023	TS Galaxy	4	(0)
- * Club domestic league appearances and goals as of 1 January 2024

Karabo Tshepe (born 27 January 1989) is a South African soccer player who last played as a midfielder for South African Premier Division side TS Galaxy.

== Career ==
He left Black Leopards in the summer of 2020 upon the expiry of his contract, and later signed for TS Galaxy.
