= Lifa Hlongwane =

South African soccer player

Personal information
- Date of birth: 22 September 1993 (age 33)
- Position: Midfielder

Team information
- Current team: Leruma United

Youth career
- Ama Bee

Senior career*
Years	Team	Apps	(Gls)
2014–2015	Royal Eagles	26	(1)
2016–2018	Jomo Cosmos	28	(5)
2017	→ TTM (loan)	11	(3)
2018–2021	Black Leopards	59	(4)
2021	Maritzburg United	12	(1)
2022–2023	TS Galaxy	35	(2)
2023–2024	Baroka	9	(0)
2024–	Leruma United	7	(0)
- * Club domestic league appearances and goals as of 12 November 2024

Lifa Hlongwane (born 22 September 1993) is a South African soccer player who plays as a midfielder for Leruma United in the National First Division.

He hails from Diepkloof and is nicknamed "Sdumo".

Following one and a half season in Royal Eagles, he joined Jomo Cosmos and made his debut in January 2016. Hlongwane first became a team regular at the first tier during the 2018-19 South African Premier Division, having joined Black Leopards. However, in his second season, he was more seldomly played by new manager Luc Eymael, and requested a loan transfer. He was reportedly let go in 2021 for "breach of contract" after he participated in an unofficial tournament. Following three months without employment, he was signed by Maritzburg United. Toward the end of the year, Hlongwane's contract with Maritzburg was terminated. Subsequently, he was picked up for free by TS Galaxy in January 2022. His goal was to save the then-bottom-placed team from relegation.

Among others, Hlongwane scored winning goals against Orlando Pirates and Mamelodi Sundowns. During the spring of 2023, Hlongwane rarely featured for the team.
