= Percy Tau =

South African footballer (born 1994)

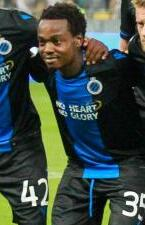
- Tau with Club Brugge in 2019

Personal information
- Full name: Percy Muzi Tau
- Date of birth: 13 May 1994 (age 32)
- Place of birth: Witbank, South Africa
- Height: 1.70 m (5 ft 7 in)
- Position: Winger

Youth career
- Mamelodi Sundowns

Senior career*
Years	Team	Apps	(Gls)
2013–2018	Mamelodi Sundowns	65	(18)
2015–2016	→ Witbank Spurs (loan)	11	(3)
2018–2021	Brighton & Hove Albion	3	(0)
2018–2019	→ Union SG (loan)	23	(6)
2019–2020	→ Club Brugge (loan)	18	(3)
2020–2021	→ Anderlecht (loan)	14	(4)
2021–2025	Al Ahly	59	(17)
2025	Qatar SC	9	(0)
2025–2026	Thep Xanh Nam Dinh	9	(1)

International career^{‡}
2015–	South Africa	52	(16)
- * Club domestic league appearances and goals as of 13 March 2026 ‡ National team caps and goals as of 25 March 2025

Percy Muzi Tau (born 13 May 1994) is a South African professional soccer player who plays as a winger. He is currently a free agent.

Tau began his footballing career with Premier Soccer League side Mamelodi Sundowns where he made 100 appearances either side of a loan to Witbank Spurs. During his time with Sundowns, he won the league title twice and the CAF Champions League once and was named Footballer of the Year and joint-top-goalscorer in his final season with the club.

Tau joined Brighton & Hove Albion in 2018 but, due to work-permit complications, was loaned out to Belgian side Union SG with whom he won the Proximus League Player of the Season award. His form earned him a short-term move to Club Brugge, where he won a league winners' medal the following season, before being loaned out for a third consecutive season when he signed for rivals Anderlecht in 2020.

Tau signed for Egyptian Premier League side Al Ahly in 2021 on a two-year contract. He became the highest scoring South African in the FIFA Club World Cup in December 2023 when he scored his third goal of the competition.

== Club career ==
=== Mamelodi Sundowns ===
Born in Witbank, Tau began his career with Mamelodi Sundowns in the Premier Soccer League. He made his professional debut for the club on 25 February 2014 in the league against Orlando Pirates. He came on as an 85th-minute substitute for Domingues as Sundowns lost 1–0. Tau then scored his first professional goal for the club during a Nedbank Cup match on 22 March 2014 against Golden Arrows. His 90th-minute goal was the fourth and final goal for Sundowns as they won 4–1 against the Arrows. He then scored his first goal in international club competition on 5 April 2015 in a CAF Champions League match against TP Mazembe. He scored the Sundown's one and only goal of the match in the 84th minute as Mamelodi Sundowns fell 3–1. After two seasons and rarely appearing for Mamelodi Sundowns, Tau was released in the 2014–15 season.

On the advice of then-youth coach Rhulani Mokwena, he was loaned to National First Division side Witbank Spurs instead. He made his debut for the club on 6 February 2016 in a 3–1 win over African Warriors and went on to score 3 goals in 11 appearances during his loan spell.

After a season with Witbank Spurs, Tau rejoined Mamelodi Sundowns and was included in the squad for the club's CAF Champions League campaign. He featured throughout and played every minute of both legs of a 3–1 aggregate win over Egyptian side Zamalek in the CAF Champions League Final. The victory was Sundowns' first ever triumph in a continental competition. He then scored his first goal in the league for the club on 2 November 2016 against Polokwane City. He scored the first of two goals for the side as they went on to win 2–0. Tau then made his debut for the side in the FIFA Club World Cup on 11 December 2016 against Kashima Antlers. Sundowns were knocked-out of the competition after losing to the Japanese side 2–0. During the fifth-place match, Tau scored the only goal for Sundowns as they fell 4–1 to Jeonbuk Hyundai Motors of South Korea.

During the 2017–18 season, Tau scored 11 goals to help Mamelodi Sundowns to the league title. His form throughout the season saw him share the Lesley Manyathela Golden Boot with Rodney Ramagalela and earned him the Footballer of the Season and Players' Player of the Season awards. As a result of his achievements, Tau was courted by a number of European clubs during the off-season. Amidst the speculation surrounding his future, he refused to join Sundowns in the pre-season preparations in an attempt to force through a move.

=== Brighton & Hove Albion ===
On 20 July 2018, Tau signed a four-year contract with English Premier League club Brighton & Hove Albion, for an undisclosed transfer fee, reported to be in the region of R50 million (UK£2.7 million), a South African record sale of a domestic player. Brighton manager, Chris Hughton, confirmed that Tau would be loaned out shortly after his transfer, after failing a UK work permit, as well as him wanting the South African international to gain European football experience. On 7 January 2021, he returned to Brighton & Hove Albion, after being recalled from his loan spell at Anderlecht.

==== Loan to Union SG ====
On 15 August, Tau joined Belgian second division side Union SG, owned by Brighton chairman Tony Bloom, on a season-long loan. He was immediately introduced into the first team and played a particularly important role in the Belgian Cup during the first half of the season, scoring four goals in six appearances to help the club reach the semi-finals after recording historic wins over both Anderlecht and Genk.

In April 2019, after scoring six goals and recording seven assist to help Union finish the season in second place, Tau was one of three players nominated for the Player of the Season award, alongside teammate Faïz Selemani. He ultimately won the award and was named in the league's team of the season.

==== Loan to Club Brugge ====
On 29 July 2019, Tau signed for Belgian side Club Brugge on loan for the 2019–20 season. He made his debut for the club on 2 August 2019 against Sint-Truiden where he scored in the club's 6–0 home victory. On 13 August, he was sent off with for a second bookable offence during a 3–3 away draw against Dynamo Kiev in what was only his second career Champions League game. Brugge went through 4–3 on aggregate. Tau appeared in the 2–2 away draw at Real Madrid on 1 October, where he assisted the first goal.

The league was ended in May with one remaining match to be played due to COVID-19. Tau played 18 league matches scoring three as Club Bruges won the title, finishing 15 points clear of 2nd place.

==== Loan to Anderlecht ====
On 4 August 2020, Tau signed for Belgian club Anderlecht, on a one-year loan. He made his debut for the club on 16 August 2020, coming on as a substitute in the 64th minute against Sint-Truiden, and scored his first goal as Anderlecht won the match 3–1.

==== Return to Brighton ====
On 7 January 2021, Tau was recalled by parent club Brighton, after just four months at Anderlecht, following the club receiving a Governing Body Endorsement, the new points-based system for non-English players which came into force when the transition period following the UK's exit from the European Union ended, from the FA for Tau. On 10 January 2021, 905 days after signing for The Seagulls Tau made his debut coming on as a substitute in an FA Cup third round tie away at Newport County in which Brighton eventually won on penalties. Three days later he made his league debut for Brighton starting in the 1–0 Premier League loss at Manchester City. On 15 May, while only making his third Premier League appearance Tau sent in a through ball to Danny Welbeck who chipped the ball over keeper Łukasz Fabiański putting The Seagulls ahead in an eventual 1–1 home draw against West Ham.

=== Al Ahly ===
Tau signed a permanent deal for Egyptian Premier League Al Ahly on 26 August 2021. Tau played in the 2021 CAF Super Cup on 22 December, in which he assisted Al Ahly's goal in the eventual penalty shootout victory.

Tau would go on to make 126 appearances for Ahly in all competitions, scoring 30 goals and providing 14 assists. He enjoyed considerable success during his time at Ahly, winning two CAF Champions League titles, two Egyptian Premier League championships, four Egyptian Super Cups, and was named the CAF Interclub Player of the Year in 2023, becoming the first South African to win the award.

=== Qatar SC ===
In January 2025, following three and a half seasons with Al Ahly in Egypt, Tau signed for Qatar Stars League club Qatar SC. Qatar SC paid Al Ahly a reported transfer fee of $450,000 for Tau.

=== Thep Xanh Nam Dinh ===
On 16 August 2025, Vietnamese club Thep Xanh Nam Dinh announced the arrival of Tau at the club.

== International career ==
Tau made his debut for South Africa on 17 October 2015 in a 0–2 loss to Angola in a 2016 African Nations Championship qualification match. On 25 March 2017, he scored his first international goal in the 69th minute against Guinea-Bissau after receiving a yellow card two minutes earlier.

On 13 October 2018, Tau was one of South Africa's goal scorers as the nation recorded its largest ever victory with a 6–0 win over Seychelles in an Africa Cup of Nations qualifier. On 24 March 2019, he scored twice in a 2–1 win over Libya to secure South Africa's qualification for the 2019 Africa Cup of Nations. His brace took him to four goals for the qualifying campaign, ranking him among the highest goalscorers in qualification.

Tau was named in the South African squad for the 2019 edition of the African Cup of Nations. He started in all five games for his country where they made the quarter-final stage, losing to Nigeria to deny them a semi-final spot.

== Career statistics ==
=== Club ===
As of match played 6 May 2026

Appearances and goals by club, season and competition
Club	Season	League			National cup (Note: Includes Nedbank Cup, FA Cup, Belgian Cup, Egypt Cup, Emir of Qatar Cup, Vietnamese Cup)		League cup (Note: Includes Carling Knockout Cup)		Continental		Other		Total	
Club	Season	Division	Apps	Goals	Apps	Goals	Apps	Goals	Apps	Goals	Apps	Goals	Apps	Goals
Mamelodi Sundowns	2013–14	South African Premier Division	1	0	1	1	0	0	—		0	0	2	1
Mamelodi Sundowns	2014–15	South African Premier Division	5	0	1	0	0	0	1 (Note: Appearance(s) in CAF Champions League)	1	1 (Note: Appearance(s) in MTN 8)	0	8	1
Mamelodi Sundowns	2016–17	South African Premier Division	29	7	1	0	2	0	7	2	4	0	43	9
Mamelodi Sundowns	2017–18	South African Premier Division	30	11	3	2	1	0	13	0	3 (Note: One appearance in MTN 8, two appearances and one goal in FIFA Club World Cup)	1	50	14
Mamelodi Sundowns	Total		65	18	6	3	3	0	21	3	8	1	103	25
Witbank Spurs (loan)	2015–16	National First Division	11	3	0	0	—		—		—		11	3
Brighton & Hove Albion	2018–19	Premier League	0	0	0	0	0	0	—		—		0	0
Brighton & Hove Albion	2020–21	Premier League	3	0	3	0	0	0	—		—		6	0
Brighton & Hove Albion	Total		3	0	3	0	0	0	0	0	0	0	6	0
Union SG (loan)	2018–19	Belgian First Division B	23	6	6	4	—		—		6 (Note: Appearances in Belgian Pro League European play-offs)	3	35	13
Club Brugge (loan)	2019–20	Belgian Pro League	18	3	4	1	—		8 (Note: Six appearances in UEFA Champions League, two appearances in UEFA Europa League)	0	0	0	30	4
Anderlecht (loan)	2020–21	Belgian Pro League	14	4	0	0	—		—		—		14	4
Al Ahly	2021–22	Egyptian Premier League	20	5	2	0	—		10	3	2 (Note: One appearance in Egyptian Super Cup, one appearance in CAF Super Cup)	0	34	8
Al Ahly	2022–23	Egyptian Premier League	21	3	4	1	—		12	5	5 (Note: Four appearances and one goal in FIFA Club World Cup, one appearance in Egyptian Super Cup)	1	42	10
Al Ahly	2023–24	Egyptian Premier League	10	7	1	0	—		12	1	10 (Note: One appearance in CAF Super Cup, four appearances in African Football League, three appearances and one goal in FIFA Club World Cup, two appearances in Egyptian Super Cup)	1	33	9
Al Ahly	2024–25	Egyptian Premier League	6	0	—		0	0	6	3	4 (Note: One appearance in CAF Super Cup, two appearances in Egyptian Super Cup, one appearance in FIFA Intercontinental Cup)	0	16	3
Al Ahly	Total		59	17	7	1	0	0	40	12	21	2	125	30
Qatar SC	2024–25	Qatar Stars League	9	0	1	0	—		—		—		10	0
Thep Xanh Nam Dinh	2025–26	V.League 1	9	1	0	0	—		6 (Note: Appearances in AFC Champions League Two)	0	6 (Note: Appearances in ASEAN Club Championship)	0	21	1
Career total			210	52	27	9	3	0	75	15	41	6	358	80

=== International ===
As of match played 25 March 2025

Appearances and goals by national team and year
National team	Year	Apps	Goals
South Africa	2015	2	0
South Africa	2016	0	0
South Africa	2017	9	4
South Africa	2018	6	3
South Africa	2019	9	2
South Africa	2020	3	3
South Africa	2021	6	1
South Africa	2022	1	0
South Africa	2023	6	2
South Africa	2024	8	1
South Africa	2025	2	0
Total		52	16

Scores and results list South Africa's goal tally first.

List of international goals scored by Percy Tau
No.	Date	Venue	Opponent	Score	Result	Competition
1	25 March 2017	Moses Mabhida Stadium, Durban, South Africa	Guinea-Bissau	2–0	3–1	Friendly
2	10 June 2017	Godswill Akpabio International Stadium, Uyo, Nigeria	Nigeria	2–0	2–0	2019 Africa Cup of Nations qualification
3	7 October 2017	FNB Stadium, Johannesburg, South Africa	Burkina Faso	1–0	3–1	2018 FIFA World Cup qualification
4	14 November 2017	Stade Léopold Sédar Senghor, Dakar, Senegal	Senegal	1–1	1–2	2018 FIFA World Cup qualification
5	24 March 2018	Levy Mwanawasa Stadium, Ndola, Zambia	Zambia	1–0	2–0	2018 Four Nations Tournament
6	14 October 2018	FNB Stadium, Johannesburg, South Africa	Seychelles	4–0	6–0	2019 Africa Cup of Nations qualification
7	20 November 2018	Moses Mabhida Stadium, Durban, South Africa	Paraguay	1–1	1–1	Friendly
8	24 March 2019	Stade Taïeb Mhiri, Sfax, Tunisia	Libya	1–0	2–1	2019 Africa Cup of Nations qualification
9	24 March 2019	Stade Taïeb Mhiri, Sfax, Tunisia	Libya	2–1	2–1	2019 Africa Cup of Nations qualification
10	13 November 2020	Moses Mabhida Stadium, Durban, South Africa	São Tomé and Príncipe	1–0	2–0	2021 Africa Cup of Nations qualification
11	16 November 2020	Nelson Mandela Bay Stadium, Port Elizabeth, South Africa	São Tomé and Príncipe	2–1	4–2	2021 Africa Cup of Nations qualification
12	16 November 2020	Nelson Mandela Bay Stadium, Port Elizabeth, South Africa	São Tomé and Príncipe	4–2	4–2	2021 Africa Cup of Nations qualification
13	25 March 2021	FNB Stadium, Johannesburg, South Africa	Ghana	1–1	1–1	2021 Africa Cup of Nations qualification
14	17 March 2023	FNB Stadium, Johannesburg, South Africa	Morocco	1–0	2–1	2023 Africa Cup of Nations qualification
15	18 November 2023	Moses Mabhida Stadium, Durban, South Africa	Benin	1–0	2–1	2026 FIFA World Cup qualification
16	21 January 2024	Amadou Gon Coulibaly Stadium, Korhogo, Ivory Coast	Namibia	1–0	4–0	2023 Africa Cup of Nations

== Personal life ==
His brother was footballer Mogau Tshehla, who died in a car accident.

== Honours ==
Mamelodi Sundowns

- Premier Soccer League: 2013–14, 2017–18
- Nedbank Cup: 2014–15
- Telkom Knockout: 2015
- CAF Champions League: 2016
- CAF Super Cup: 2017

Club Brugge

- Belgian Pro League: 2019–20

Al Ahly

- Egyptian Premier League: 2022–23, 2023–24
- Egypt Cup: 2021–22, 2022–23
- Egyptian Super Cup: 2021–22, 2022–23, 2023–24, 2024
- CAF Champions League: 2022–23, 2023–24
- CAF Super Cup: 2021
- FIFA African–Asian–Pacific Cup: 2024
- FIFA Club World Cup third place: 2021, 2023

South Africa

- Africa Cup of Nations third place: 2023
- 2018 Four Nations Tournament

Individual

- Lesley Manyathela Golden Boot: 2017–18
- PSL Footballer of the Year: 2017–18
- PSL Players' Player of the Season: 2017–18
- Belgian First Division B Player of the Season: 2018–19
- Belgian First Division B Team of the Season: 2018–19
- African Inter-Club Player of the Year: 2023
