= Ishmael Maluleke =

South African footballer

Personal information
- Date of birth: 7 July 1977 (age 49)
- Place of birth: Giyani, South Africa
- Position: Forward

Senior career*
Years	Team	Apps	(Gls)
-1999	African Wanderers F.C.		
1999/2000	Manning Rangers F.C.		
2000/2001	AmaZulu F.C.		
2001-2002	Manning Rangers F.C.		
2002-2003/04	Mamelodi Sundowns F.C.		
2004/2005	Silver Stars F.C.		
2004/2005	Jomo Cosmos F.C.		
2005/2006	AmaZulu F.C.		
2007/2008	Thanda Royal Zulu F.C.		

International career
2002	South Africa	1	(0)
- * Club domestic league appearances and goals

Ishmael Maluleke (born 7 July 1977) is a South African former soccer player.

== Career ==
Maluleke's mother, pastor and speaker KS Maluleke, did not want him to play football as a child, fearing he would become crippled.

Despite wanting to sign for SuperSport United, Ajax Cape Town, and Dynamos instead, he joined Mamelodi Sundowns, the most successful team in South Africa from Manning Rangers through his agent, where he struggled to get game time.

In 2016, Maluleke said that "“Playing soccer was the toughest decision for me to take because I grew up in a family of Christians and the worst part is that while my mom was a pastor I had to play for teams that used muthi (witchcraft)".
