= 2017–18 South African Premiership =

Premiership
- Season: 2017–18
- Country: South Africa (16 teams)
- Champions: Mamelodi Sundowns (8th title)
- Relegated: Ajax Cape Town; Platinum Stars
- Champions League: Mamelodi Sundowns; Orlando Pirates
- Confederation Cup: Kaizer Chiefs; Free State Stars
- Matches: 240
- Goals: 489 (2.04 per match)
- Top goalscorer: Rodney Ramagalela; Percy Tau (11 goals)
- Biggest home win: Orlando Pirates 4-0 Bidvest Wits (25 April 2018)
- Highest scoring: Chippa United 2-4 Orlando Pirates (25 February 2018)
- Longest unbeaten run: 9 games Golden Arrows
- Longest winless run: 9 games Platinum stars
- Longest losing run: 7 games platinum stars
- All statistics correct as of 20 March 2018.

The 2017–18 South African Premiership season (known as the ABSA Premiership for sponsorship reasons) was the 22nd season of the Premiership since its conception in 1996.

Bidvest Wits were the defending champions, having won the previous 2016–17 South African Premier Division season. The season featured 15 teams from the 2016–17 season and one new team from the 2016–17 National First Division: AmaZulu replaced relegated Highlands Park. AmaZulu, although finishing only fifth in the National First Division (NFD) purchased winner's Thanda Royal Zulu's league status upon completion of the NFD season.

== Teams ==
=== Stadiums and locations ===
Location of teams in the 2017–18 Premiership.

== League table ==
=== Standings ===
Pos	Team	Pld	W	D	L	GF	GA	GD	Pts	Promotion, qualification or relegation
1	Mamelodi Sundowns (C)	30	18	6	6	49	24	+25	60	2018–19 CAF Champions League
2	Orlando Pirates	30	15	10	5	41	26	+15	55	2018–19 CAF Champions League
3	Kaizer Chiefs	30	12	12	6	27	22	+5	48	2018–19 CAF Confederation Cup
4	Maritzburg United	30	11	11	8	36	23	+13	44	
5	Cape Town City	30	11	7	12	26	27	−1	40	
6	Free State Stars (Note: Free State Stars qualify for CAF Confederation Cup as winners of the 2017-18 Nedbank Cup.)	30	10	10	10	29	31	−2	40	2018–19 CAF Confederation Cup
7	SuperSport United	30	9	12	9	28	28	0	39	
8	Golden Arrows	30	8	14	8	36	34	+2	38	
9	AmaZulu	30	9	11	10	30	35	−5	38	
10	Chippa United	30	7	16	7	27	26	+1	37	
11	Bloemfontein Celtic	30	8	13	9	25	32	−7	37	
12	Polokwane City	30	7	15	8	33	33	0	36	
13	Bidvest Wits	30	9	9	12	27	36	−9	36	
14	Baroka FC	30	7	13	10	32	38	−6	34	
15	Platinum Stars (R)	30	6	9	15	23	35	−12	27	Playoff Tournament
16	Ajax Cape Town (Note: Ajax Cape Town had three results awarded as 3-0 victories to the opposition. They lost seven points due to fielding an ineligible player.) (R)	30	6	6	18	21	40	−19	24	2018–19 National First Division

Updated to match(es) played on 13 May 2018. Source: http://www.psl.co.za/matchcentre?type=Log
Rules for classification: 1) Points; 2) Goal difference; 3) Number of goals scored;
(C) Champions; (R) Relegated

== Statistics ==
=== Top scorers ===
As of 13 April 2018

Rank	Player	Club	Goals
1	(South Africa) Rodney Ramagalela	Polokwane City	11
1	(South Africa) Percy Tau	Mamelodi Sundowns	11
3	(South Africa) Gift Motupa	Baroka	9
4	(Zimbabwe) Khama Billiat	Mamelodi Sundowns	8
4	(South Africa) Lerato Lamola	Lamontville Golden Arrows	8
4	(South Africa) Aubrey Modiba	SuperSport United	8
4	(Zimbabwe) Evans Rusike	Supersport United	8
8	(South Africa) Mhlengi Cele	AmaZulu	7
8	(Zimbabwe) Knox Mutizwa	Lamontville Golden Arrows	7
10	(Belgium) Andrea Fileccia	Maritzburg United	6
10	(South Africa) Sepana Letsoalo	Bloemfontein Celtic	6
10	(South Africa) Siphelele Magubane	Lamontville Golden Arrows	6
10	(South Africa) Lehlohonolo Majoro	Bidvest Wits	6
10	(Zimbabwe) Walter Musona	Polokwane City	6
10	(South Africa) Sibusiso Vilakazi	Mamelodi Sundowns	6
10	(South Africa) Themba Zwane	Mamelodi Sundowns	6

== Attendances ==
#	Football club	Average attendance
1	Kaizer Chiefs	18,777
2	Orlando Pirates	11,568
3	Bloemfontein Celtic	10,300
4	Mamelodi Sundowns	8,067
5	Chippa United	7,815
6	Maritzburg United	7,640
7	Cape Town City	6,610
8	Ajax Cape Town	6,035
9	AmaZulu FC	5,324
10	Polokwane City FC	4,766
11	Baroka	4,625
12	SuperSport United	4,513
13	Free State Stars	3,620
14	Platinum Stars	2,560
15	Bidvest Wits	2,438
16	Golden Arrows	2,361
