= 2017–18 Nedbank Cup =

ke yona (the one)

Tournament details
- Country: South Africa

Final positions
- Champions: Free State Stars
- Runners-up: Martizburg United

Tournament statistics
- Matches played: 36
- Goals scored: 96 (2.67 per match)

The 2017–18 Nedbank Cup is a South African club football (soccer) tournament. The knockout tournament, based on the English FA Cup format, was won by Free State Stars.

== Qualifying round ==
12 December 2017	Stellenbosch	3–0	Mbombela United	Parow Park Stadium, Cape Town
15:00	Lark 6'; Monene 57'; Burds 60'

12 December 2017	Super Eagles	3–0	Black Leopards	Goble Park, Bethlehem
15:00	Selepe 41', 47'; Setsumi 89'

13 December 2017	Witbank Spurs	1–2	Richards Bay	Witbank Stadium, Witbank
15:00	Skhosana 40'		Muishond 7', 60'

13 December 2017	Jomo Cosmos	1–1 (a.e.t.) (1–3 p)	Ubuntu Cape Town	Vosloorus Stadium, Vosloorus
15:00	Lebahi 71'		Sibanda 53'
	Penalties
	Lebahi (penalty missed); Tlabakwe (penalty missed); Mulenga (penalty scored); Laqwela (penalty missed)		Sigwebela (penalty scored); Fredericks (penalty scored); Heutchou (penalty missed); Sibanda (penalty scored)

13 December 2017	Mthatha Bucks	2–1 (a.e.t.)	Uthongathi	Mthatha Stadium, Mthatha
15:00	Bhengu 50' (pen.); Erasmus 117'		Zungu 53'

13 December 2017	Cape Town All Stars	2–0	Tshakhuma TM	Parow Park, Cape Town
15:00	Tshabalala 82'; Lekapa 90+7'

13 December 2017	Royal Eagles	3–0	University of Pretoria	Sugar Ray Xulu Stadium, Durban
15:00	Sauls 69'; Kubeka 76'; Makgothi 90'

13 December 2017	Highlands Park	2–1 (a.e.t.)	Real Kings	Makhulong Stadium, Johannesburg
15:00	Ngebo 80', 116'		Mtshali 3'

== Round of 32 ==
7 February 2018	Ubuntu Cape Town	3–2 (a.e.t.)	Polokwane City	Athlone Stadium, Cape Town
19:30	Chivaviro 45+2', 49'; Madikane 114'		Phiri 13'; Musona 68'

7 February 2018	AmaZulu	2–2 (a.e.t.) (3–0 p)	Mthatha Bucks	King Zwelithini Stadium, Durban
19:30	Ouro-Akoriko 64'; Lumkwana 91'		Rantabane 56'; Bhengu 120'
	Penalties
	Nyongo (penalty scored); Ouro-Akoriko (penalty scored); Sikhakhane (penalty scored)		Erasmus (penalty missed); Ndletyana (penalty missed); Bhengu (penalty missed)

7 February 2018	Bidvest Wits	0–1	Cape Town City	Bidvest Stadium, Johannesburg
19:30			Rusike 2'

9 February 2018	Cape Town All Stars	0–1	Mamelodi Sundowns	Athlone Stadium, Cape Town
20:00			Tau 60'

10 February 2018	Steenberg United	3–1	Orbit College	Parow Park, Cape Town
15:30	Hendricks 9', 76'; George 40'		Motsoikha 77'

10 February 2018	Moroka Swallows	1–3 (a.e.t.)	Maritzburg United	Dobsonville Stadium, Cape Town
15:30	Mashego 34'		Fileccia 2', 97'; Kunene 112'

10 February 2018	Phiva Young Stars	0–2	Chippa United	Kabokweni Stadium, Kabokweni
15:30			Magqwaka 14'; Mntambo 30'

10 February 2018	Orlando Pirates	2–0	Ajax Cape Town	Orlando Stadium, Johannesburg
20:15	Morrison 42', 48'

11 February 2018	Mariveni United	1–3	EC Bees	Peter Mokaba Stadium, Polokwane
15:30	Mayimele 69' (pen.)		Dlamini 33'; Mtule 45+1', 59' (pen.)

11 February 2018	Kaizer Chiefs	3–0	Golden Arrows	FNB Stadium, Johannesburg
15:30	Moon 52'; Parker 81'; Malongoane 84'

11 February 2018	Happy Wanderers	0–1	Royal Eagles	Sugar Ray Xulu Stadium, Durban
15:30			Niang 14'

11 February 2018	Bloemfontein Celtic	1–1 (a.e.t.) (5–4 p)	SuperSport United	Dr. Petrus Molemela Stadium, Bloemfontein
15:30	Mabena 36'		Mbule 58'

14 February 2018	Richards Bay	5–0	Bloemfontein Young Tigers	Umhlathuze Sports Complex Grounds, Richards Bay
15:30	Madondo 23'; Gumede 26', 85' (pen.); Sentsho 70'; Nkoana 90+2'

14 February 2018	Super Eagles	1–2 (a.e.t.)	Free State Stars	Goble Park, Bethlehem
18:00	Mbuli 45'		Mahamutsa 90'; Anas 94'

14 February 2018	Platinum Stars	0–1	Baroka	Royal Bafokeng Stadium, Rustenburg
19:30			Motupa 70'

14 February 2018	Stellenbosch	1–0	Highlands Park	Athlone Stadium, Cape Town
19:30	Rayners 13'

== Round of 16 ==
9 March 2018	AmaZulu	2–3	Ubuntu Cape Town	King Zwelithini Stadium, Umlazi
20:00	Khenyeza 76'; Karuru 90'		Fredericks 7'; Adonis 26'; Mahlatsi 47'

10 March 2018	Free State Stars	2–1	Chippa United	Goble Park, Bethlehem
15:30	Masehe 46'; Keïta 88'		Mntambo 57'

10 March 2018	Baroka	2–0	Steenberg United	Peter Mokaba Stadium, Polokwane
15:30	Sidumo 42'; Sodi 84'

10 March 2018	Kaizer Chiefs	2–1	Stellenbosch	Moses Mabhida Stadium, Durban
20:15	Mathoho 28'; Castro 66'		Robertson 76'

11 March 2018	Royal Eagles	1–2	Maritzburg United	Princess Magogo Stadium, Durban
15:30	Niang 72'		Mekoa 45'; Xulu 89'

11 March 2018	Bloemfontein Celtic	3–1	Richards Bay	Dr. Petrus Molemela Stadium, Bloemfontein
15:30	Maruping 40'; Maema 86'; Pfumbidzai 90'		Nkoana 90+2'

13 March 2018	Mamelodi Sundowns	2–1	EC Bees	Loftus Versfeld Stadium, Pretoria
19:30	Kekana 46'; Morena 76'		Chikile 16'

14 March 2018	Cape Town City	1–0	Orlando Pirates	Cape Town Stadium, Cape Town
19:30	Patosi 55'

== Quarterfinals ==
31 March 2018	Maritzburg United	2–1	Bloemfontein Celtic	Harry Gwala Stadium, Pietermaritzburg
16:30	Maboe 1'; Fileccia 80'		Motshegwa 76'

31 March 2018	Ubuntu Cape Town	1–1 (a.e.t.) (2–4 p)	Free State Stars	Athlone Stadium, Cape Town
16:30	Ganga 28'		Dlamini 44'

31 March 2018	Kaizer Chiefs	1–0	Baroka	Nelson Mandela Bay Stadium, Port Elizabeth
21:15	Mathoho 37'

1 April 2018	Cape Town City	1–2	Mamelodi Sundowns	Cape Town Stadium, Cape Town

== Semi-finals ==
21 April 2018	Kaizer Chiefs	0–2	Free State Stars	Moses Mabhida Stadium, Durban
21:15

22 April 2018	Maritzburg United	3–1	Mamelodi Sundowns	Harry Gwala Stadium, Pietermaritzburg
16:30

== Final ==
19 May 2018	Maritzburg United	0–1	Free State Stars	Cape Town Stadium, Cape Town
19:00			Sthembiso Dlamini 44'
