= Relocation of professional sports teams =

Business action in professional sports; often moving a team from one city to another

Relocation of professional sports teams occurs when a team owner moves a team, generally from one metropolitan area to another, but occasionally between municipalities in the same conurbation. The practice is most common in North America, where a league franchise system is used and the teams are overwhelmingly privately owned. Owners who move a team generally do so seeking better profits, facilities, fan support, or a combination of these.

== North America ==
Unlike most professional sport systems, North America lacks comprehensive governing bodies whose authority extends from the amateur to the highest levels of a given sport. North American sports generally do not operate a system of promotion and relegation in which poorly performing teams are replaced with teams that do well in lower-level leagues.

A city wishing to get a team in a major professional sports league can wait for the league to expand and award new franchises. However, such expansions are infrequent, and generally limited to a narrow window in time. Many current owners believe 32 is the optimal size for a major league due to playoff structure and ease of scheduling. As of 2024, each of the major leagues has 30 or 32 franchises. The National Hockey League (NHL) has expanded to 32 teams, with the Vegas Golden Knights having become the league's 31st team in 2017 and the Seattle Kraken becoming the 32nd team in 2021.

In past decades, aspiring owners whose overtures had been rejected by the established leagues would respond by forming a rival league in hopes that the existing major league would eventually agree to a merger; the new league would attain major league status in its own right; or the established league was compelled to expand. The 1960s American Football League (AFL) is perhaps the most recent example of a successful rival league, having achieved each of the three goals listed above in reverse order. However, all major sports have had a rival league achieve at least some of these goals in the last half of the 20th century. Baseball's proposed Continental League did not play a game, but only because Major League Baseball (MLB) responded to the proposal by adding teams in some of the new league's proposed cities. The American Basketball Association (ABA) and World Hockey Association (WHA) each succeeded in getting some of their franchises accepted into the established leagues, which had both unsuccessfully attempted to cause their upstart rivals to fold outright by adding more teams.

However, the upstart leagues owed their success in large part to the reluctance of owners in the established leagues to devote the majority of their revenues to player salaries and also to sports leagues' former reliance primarily on gate receipts for revenue. Under those conditions, an ambitious rival could often afford to lure away the sport's top players with promises of better pay, in hopes of giving the new league immediate respect and credibility from fans. Today, however, established leagues derive a large portion of their revenue from lucrative television contracts that would not be offered to an untested rival. Also, the activism of players' unions has resulted in the established leagues paying a majority of their revenues to players, thus the average salary in each of the big four leagues is now well in excess of $1 million per season.

Under present market and financial conditions, any serious attempt to form a rival league in the early 21st century would likely require hundreds of millions (if not billions) of dollars in investment and initial losses, and even if such resources were made available the upstart league's success would be far from guaranteed, as evidenced by the failure of the WWF/NBC-backed XFL in 2001 and the UFL from 2009 to 2012. The current major leagues have established lucrative relationships with all of the major media outlets in the United States, who subsidize the league's operations because their established fame ensures strong ratings; the networks are far less willing to provide such coverage to an unproven upstart league, often requiring the upstart league to pay the network for those leagues to be covered.

Therefore, as long as leagues choose not to expand or reject a city's application, the only realistic recourse is to convince the owner(s) of an existing team to move it (or convince a prospective owner to purchase a team with the intent of moving it). Owners usually move teams because of weak fan support or because the team organization is in debt and needs an adequate population for financial support or because another city offers a bigger local market or a more financially lucrative stadium/arena deal. Governments may offer lucrative deals to team owners to attract or retain a team. For example, to attract the NFL's Cleveland Browns in 1995, the state of Maryland agreed to build a new stadium in Baltimore and allow the team to use it rent-free and keep all parking, advertising and concession revenue. (This move proved so unpopular in Cleveland that the move was treated as the Baltimore Ravens being awarded an expansion franchise, and the Browns name and their official lineage would remain in Cleveland for a "reactivated" team that rejoined the NFL three years later.) A little more than a decade earlier, the Baltimore Colts left for Indianapolis (NFL owners voted to give Colts owner Robert Irsay permission to move his franchise to the city of his choosing after no satisfactory stadium would be built).

Moving sports teams is often controversial. Opponents criticize owners for leaving behind faithful fans and governments for spending millions of dollars of tax money on attracting teams. However, since sports teams in the United States are generally treated like any other business under antitrust law, there is little sports leagues can do to prevent teams from flocking to the highest bidders (for instance, the Los Angeles Rams filed suit when the other NFL owners initially blocked their move to St. Louis, which caused the NFL to back down and allow the move to proceed). Major League Baseball, unique among the major professional sports leagues, has an exemption from antitrust laws won by a Supreme Court decision but nonetheless has allowed several teams to change cities. Also recently, courts denied the attempted move of the team then known as the Phoenix Coyotes by siding with the NHL, which claimed that it had final authority over franchise moves.

Newer sports leagues tend to have more transient franchises than more established, "major" leagues, but in the mid-1990s, several NFL and NHL teams moved to other cities, and the threat of a move pushed cities with major-league teams in any sport to build new stadiums and arenas using taxpayer money. The trend continued in the 2000s, when three National Basketball Association (NBA) teams moved in a seven-year span after there were no moves at all in the 16 prior years. Critics referred to the movement of teams to the highest-bidding city as "franchise free agency."

== Australia and New Zealand ==
The two major professional sporting leagues in Australia are the Australian Football League (AFL) and National Rugby League (NRL).

Both competitions were originally based in one city (Melbourne and Sydney respectively) and expanded to a national level, and through that process, there have been team moves, mergers and closures in both leagues. The clubs are owned by members, not privately, but the North American franchise model exists, which means entry to the league is restricted. The hybrid model has meant that the leading promoter of moving is the league itself, trying to grow the football code by encouraging poorly performing clubs to move interstate.

The most significant moves in Australian history were the interstate moves of the South Melbourne Football Club to Sydney (in 1982:963 kilometres (598 mi)) and the Fitzroy Football Club's move of its playing operations to Brisbane (in 1996: 1,669 kilometres (1,037 mi)), both that crossing the cultural divide known as the Barassi Line.

== Europe ==
In Europe, moves are very rare because of the different relationship between clubs and their league in the European system of professional sports league organization. The practice is considered anathema. In most European sports, teams can be relegated from their current league to a lower one or promoted to the one above.

== Latin America and the Caribbean ==
Team moves in Latin America occur very rarely for the established teams with established bases. Smaller teams, either small team from large agglomerations or provincial teams with little or no fan base frequently move in search of a larger market and/or more affordable facilities, as frequently, there are only large complexes available with a necessity to groundshare with a larger club. The practice is considered anathema.

=== Brazil ===
The first move of a first division football team was in 2010. Grêmio Barueri moved to Presidente Prudente, becoming Grêmio Prudente, only to return as Grêmio Barueri in the middle of 2011.

Esporte Clube Dom Pedro II, named after Pedro II of Brazil was founded on February 22, 1996, in Guará. The club moved to Núcleo Bandeirante in 2009, and it was renamed to Esporte Clube Dom Pedro Bandeirante. On November 1, 2016, after achieving promotion back to the first division of the Campeonato Brasiliense, the club changed its name to Real Futebol Clube and moved to Brasília. Ahead of the 2020 campaign, the club again changed name to Real Brasília Futebol Clube.

Guaratinguetá Futebol on October 15, 2010 announced its move from Guaratinguetá to Americana, and their change of name to Americana Futebol. On November 28, 2011, after more than a year in Americana, the club's administrator, Sony Sports, announced the team's return to Guaratinguetá to compete in the 2012 Campeonato Paulista and other competitions, as Americana city and its main stadium, Estádio Décio Vitta was not able to support the club and the city's club, Rio Branco, and also because most of the supports of the club live in Guaratinguetá.

In other sports, such as volleyball, basketball or futsal, moving is more common, although it does not occur frequently.

=== Chile ===
- Badminton F.C., was a football club based in the city of Santiago, until 1969, when they moved to Curicó, before folding in 1972.
- C.D. Green Cross, founded on June 27, 1916, were a sports club based in the city of Santiago until 1965, when they moved to Temuco and merged with the local football team Deportes Temuco. The combined team were known as Green Cross Temuco until 1985 when the club adopted its current name.

=== Colombia ===
In Colombia historic teams from first division are rarely moved, but newer teams created in second division are often moved from city to city looking for a responding fan base.

- Atlético Juventud, founded in 2007, moved from Soacha to Girardot in 2010, however the club dissolved later that same year, and its affiliation rights were bought by Fortaleza F.C.
- Bajo Cauca F.C. moved to Itagüí in 2008. As a result, the local Itagüí F.C. was refounded. The team was expelled from Itagüí in May 2014, following a dispute between the club's chairman and the city's mayor regarding the financial support received by the club from Itagüí's government. The decision to expel the club from the city was made by the mayor after being publicly criticized by the club's chairman for the scarce support provided to the club. This incident meant the team would change its name to Águilas Pereira, moving to the city of Pereira and playing its home matches at Hernán Ramírez Villegas stadium, change approved by DIMAYOR's Assembly in an extraordinary meeting on July 14, 2014. In March 2015, the club moved to Rionegro, changing its name to Águilas Doradas and then Rionegro Águilas.
- Centauros Villavicencio in May 2011 moved from Villavicencio to Popayán considering its huge debts, the refusal of financial support from successive local authorities that deemed it as a feeder club for Deportes Quindío, and the support expressed from the Cauca Department Governorate for a football club in the department's capital city, thus becoming Universitario Popayán.
- Boyacá Chicó F.C., the 2008–I Colombian champions, started as a Primera B team in Bogotá only to move to Tunja after being promoted to First Division.
- Córdoba F.C., founded in 2006 moved 2 years after its creation from Montería to Sincelejo, and became Atlético de la Sabana. They in turn moved in 2011 to Barranquilla, becoming Uniautónoma FC. At the end of 2015 Uniautónoma, in turn, moved to Palmira and became Orsomarso S.C.
- Dépor F.C. was founded in 2005 in Cartago, Valle del Cauca. For the following year, the club moved to Jamundí, in the same department. During the 2006 and 2008 seasons its home was the Estadio Cacique Jamundí. Due to financial difficulties and the support from Cali's public utilities company Emcali, the club was renamed in 2009 and moved from Jamundí to the Aguablanca District in the city of Cali, now playing their home games at the Estadio Pascual Guerrero.
- Deportivo Rionegro, founded in 1957 in Rionegro, being the traditional team of the region of Antioquia, moved to Bello in 2014, being renamed to Leones Fútbol Club, and the following year they moved to Turbo where they stayed for another year before moving to Itagüí in 2016.
- Girardot F.C., founded in 1995, moved from Girardot in 2008 to Palmira, becoming Deportes Palmira. They move did not last as long as they moved a year later to Buenaventura to become Pacífico F.C. Pacífico a year after that became Sucre Fútbol Club after it moved to Sincelejo, before another year passed and moved yet again to Montería, becoming Jaguares de Córdoba.
- Univalle F.C. was founded in 1998, playing the first half in Jamundí and the second in Palmira. They were renamed Expreso Palmira in 1991. In 2002, Expreso Palmira was purchased by businessmen who renamed the club Expreso Rojo de Cartegena moving to Cartagena. In 2005 Expreso Rojo moved to Sincelejo, which only lasted a year, and in 2006 returned to Cartagena. In the 2007 season the team moved to the city of Fusagasugá, Cundinamarca. In 2009, the team moved to Zipaquirá due to economic problems. For the 2011 season Expreso Rojo decided to move back to the city of Fusagasugá, however, due to the poor performance the club moved to Soacha. In 2015, the team move back to Zipaquirá. The following season in 2016, the club was renamed as Tigres F.C.

=== Costa Rica ===
- Founded in 2004 as Brujas de Escazú, when they took over the A.D. Guanacasteca licence to play in the Primera División de Costa Rica, they moved from Nicoya, Guanacaste where they played at the Estadio Chorotega, to Escazú in an attempt to get more support from fans. In summer 2007, the club moved again to play at the Estadio Jorge "Cuty" Monge in Desamparados and were renamed Brujas F.C. The club folded in 2011.

=== Honduras ===
- Real Maya were founded on April 7, 1985. They played in first division for many season under many different names, Real Maya being the most used. In the 2002/2003 season they took the place of Real Comayagua. They were named Real Patepluma and moved to Santa Bárbara for their final two seasons in the top tier of Honduran football before being excluded from the league.

=== Jamaica ===
Hazard United, founded in 1985 in May Pen, moved in 2001 to Clarendon and renamed itself Clarendon United. JFF regulations stipulated that each club have stands to seat at least 1,500, which Clarendon lacked. So the team moved again, to St. Catherine and began to use the Ferdi Neita Sports Complex. Initially, Clarendon and the St. Catherine football club agreed to share the stadium. In 2002, St. Catherine suggested Clarendon change its affiliation to become a St. Catherine team, as the club's name was not locally identifiable and the club itself was only slowly gaining followers. Instead, Clarendon moved in 2003 to Portmore and renamed itself Portmore United. The club has since won four Premier League titles.

=== Mexico ===
Liga MX has a relegation system but its teams have some territorial rights recognized, perhaps due to U.S. influence as many league matches are aired in the U.S., where only traditional top-flight teams are perceived to most effectively reach the immigrant fan-base.

- In 1971, Cruz Azul moved from Tula de Allende to Mexico City.
- In 2003, Club Necaxa moved from Mexico City to Aguascalientes.
- In 2007, Atlante F.C. football club moved out of Mexico City to Cancún.
- In May 2013 Jaguares de Chiapas moved from Tuxtla Gutiérrez to Querétaro and became Querétaro F.C., which left the city of Tuxtla Gutiérrez without a first division football team.
- In May 2013 San Luis F.C. later moved from San Luis Potosí to Tuxtla Gutiérrez and became Chiapas F.C., which brought first division football back to the city.
- In May 2013, C.F. La Piedad, who were promoted to Liga MX, moved to Veracruz where Tiburones Rojos de Veracruz played. Tiburones Rojos de Veracruz who played in the Ascenso MX moved to San Luis Potosí and became Atletico San Luis.
- In June 2020, Atlante F.C. football club moved back to Mexico City from Cancún.
- In June 2020, Monarcas Morelia, founded in 1950, moved from Morelia to Mazatlán and became Mazatlán F.C.

=== Peru ===
In Peru several teams have had to use already built large stadiums, including ones in the interior of the country, to be able to participate in Peruvian Primera División; this includes several teams from the capital, Lima, who have not been able to establish fanbases in their districts due to the required moves.

- Total Clean FBC played in Arequipa at the Estadio Mariano Melgar. The club was in a large amount of debt and sold 51% of the club to the vice-president of Atlético Chalaco. The club was renamed Total Chalaco and moved to Callao.
- Binacional is originally from Desaguadero on the border with Bolivia but as it rose in the ranks it moved to Paucarpata Ward in Arequipa in 2016, and then back to its home region of Puno but at Juliaca, 102 miles away from its original base; this was the place from where their successful campaign for the Peruvian championship took place in 2019.

=== Venezuela ===
- Deportivo Galicia, founded in Caracas, the club moved, in 2002, to Maracay, in the state of Aragua, when its name changed to Galicia de Aragua, playing their home games at the Giuseppe Antonelli stadium. The team switched from their traditional blue and white colours to the state's yellow and red and changed their name to Galicia de Aragua. In January 2002, they became a separate entity Aragua F.C. when they moved to Estadio Olímpico Hermanos Ghersi Páez.
- Lara F.C., based in Barquisimeto, Lara, in 2012, due to strong financial problems, the team moved to the city of Los Teques, and subsequently to Caracas and changed its name to Metropolitanos F.C.

== Asia ==
Team moves in Asia are done according to the type of sport played and/or the predominant style of league organization, as well as individual economic circumstances. For instance, in Japan there is a difference between Nippon Professional Baseball which is run like MLB, and the J.League which is run like European football leagues.

Club moves are also common when an amateur or semiprofessional club tries to acquire its own facilities to become a professional club, and no money and/or space is available to build their own in a long-established location.

=== China ===
Team moves in China are very common. Although China has a European-style promotion and relegation league system, the teams themselves are North American-style franchises, which means the teams are overwhelmingly privately owned and therefore more prone to moving. Owners who move a team generally do so seeking better profits, facilities, fan support, or a combination of these. There are neither rules regarding moves nor many established fan bases, outside a handful of top teams.

=== Hong Kong ===
- Gansu Tianma F.C. was a football team based in Lanzhou, Gansu, who were relegated to the Yi League in 2004 and sold to Dongguan Dongcheng, who moved the club to the Hong Kong First Division League. The club folded in 2009.

=== India ===
- In 2019, the Delhi Dynamos, a top-tier football club based in New Delhi to Bhubaneswar, and renamed the club Odisha FC.

=== Indonesia ===
The club currently known as Madura United F.C. has several home bases (and names) throughout the years, first formed in 1986 as Pelita Jaya with home base in Jakarta. It then moved to Solo in 2000, Cilegon in 2002, Purwakarta in 2006, Bandung in 2008, and Karawang in 2009, before moving back to Bandung in 2012. Throughout those years, the team retained the "Pelita" name until it was rebranded as Persipasi Bandung Raya for the ultimately abandoned 2015 Indonesia Super League, although the club's home base was actually in Bekasi at the time. The current iteration of the club began in 2016, ahead of the temporary Indonesia Soccer Championship.

=== Iran ===
- Saba Qom F.C. was a team based in Qom, Iran, dissolved in 2018. The team was a former part of Saba Battery Club, owned by Saba Battery Co., and was moved to Qom in 2007, although they were formerly registered as a team from Tehran playing at Shahid Derakhshan Stadium of Robat Karim.
- In late May 2007 rumours of the dissolution of Pas Tehran's football team began to emerge. It was said that because the city of Tehran has many football teams that have low attendance figures, it would be best for a number of teams to be moved to other cities. On 9 June 2007, Pas Tehran was dissolved. Their right to participate in the Persian Gulf Cup was given to a newly formed team called Pas Hamedan. The staff and players of the football team were move to Hamedan in order to form the team. Additionally the multisport Pas Cultural and Sport Club is only participate in amateur and youth sporting events. It is not clear if the management of Pas Sports Club will restart the football team in future years.
- Gostaresh Foulad Tabriz F.C. based in Tabriz, founded in 2008, was owned by Mohammad Reza Zonuzi, an Iranian businessman and economist and was one of the few privately owned clubs in Iran's Premier League. In 2018, the club's ownership was moved to Amir Hossein Alagheband and the club moved to Urmia.
- Damash Iranian were set up in July 2006 in Tehran by a private investor. As a result of the dissolution on July 9, 2008, the now named Damash Tehran was reformed as Damash Lorestan and moved to city of Dorood. They later renamed Gahar Zagros.
- Payam Khorasan F.C. is currently based in Mashhad, Razavi Khorasan. The club is more commonly known as Payam Mashhad after when it was based in Mashhad from 1976 to May 2011. The club was moved to Nishapur from May to November 2011, however due to lack of support in Nishapur, the club moved back to Mashhad.
- During the 1980 outbreak of the Iran–Iraq War, Abadan and Khuzestan were heavily hit, which meant the club Sanat Naft Abadan F.C. from 1980 to 1988 was based in Shiraz, returning to Abadan after the war.

=== Japan ===
==== Association football ====
The J.League is run similarly to European football leagues. In contrast to the baseball league it has allowed only a few teams to move out of crowded or unprofitable markets:

- The most prominent move was Tokyo Verdy moving from Kawasaki, Kanagawa to Tokyo.
- Thespa Kusatsu actually plays in the nearby larger city of Maebashi, Gunma because Kusatsu does not have a large stadium. In 2024 they renamed themselves Thespa Gunma to reflect their status as the top team in their prefecture.
- Tokyo Verdy, FC Tokyo, Gamba Osaka and FC Osaka play outside their city limits but in due to the specific nature of these large cities the circumstances are for practical reasons.
- A.C. Nagano Parceiro played in Saku from 2014 to 2015 due to their stadium in Nagano not being fit for J.League football.
- Kyoto Sanga F.C. moved to a football-specific stadium in Kameoka, outside the city of Kyoto, in 2020.
- V-Varen Nagasaki moved to a football-specific stadium in Nagasaki city proper in 2024 after years of playing in nearby Isahaya.

==== Baseball ====
Nippon Professional Baseball is run in similar fashion to MLB and has moved several franchises out of crowded markets. Moves also happened when the teams changed ownership (which also sometimes involved changing the team name).

- Hokkaido Nippon-Ham Fighters were originally based in Tokyo and moved to Sapporo, Hokkaido in 2004. They moved outside Sapporo to a new stadium in Kitahiroshima in 2023, but did not change their name.
- Fukuoka SoftBank Hawks were originally based in Osaka and moved to Fukuoka in 1988 after Nankai Electric Railway sold the team to Daiei. The team was acquired by SoftBank in 2004 but did not change location.
- Saitama Seibu Lions moved from Fukuoka to Tokorozawa, Saitama in 1979 after Nishi-Nippon Railroad sold the team to Seibu Railway.

=== Kyrgyzstan ===
- Dordoi Naryn moved in 2010 from Naryn to the capital city Bishkek to play at the Spartak Stadium.

=== Lebanon ===
- Olympic Beirut moved from Beirut to Tripoli, becoming Tripoli SC

=== Philippines ===
- Kaya F.C.–Makati moved from Makati to Iloilo City for the 2018 Philippines Football League season, becoming Kaya F.C.–Iloilo and made the Iloilo Sports Complex their home venue. Prior to their move, Kaya F.C. had the University of Makati Stadium as their home stadium. In 2024, they moved to the Campo Alcantara Stadium in nearby town of Pavia, Iloilo. In 2024-25 Philippines Football League, the team played their home games at the Iloilo Sports Complex.
- Maharlika Manila F.C. moved from Manila to Taguig for the 2024 Philippines Football League season, becoming Maharlika Taguig F.C. and made McKinley Hill Stadium as their home venue. Prior to their move, Maharlika Taguig had the Rizal Memorial Stadium as their home stadium.
- Davao Aguilas F.C. moved their home stadium from Davao del Norte Sports Complex to the University of Makati Stadium for the 2024 Philippines Football League season. The club moved to Makati in 2025 and became Aguilas-UMak F.C.
- In 2024, MPBL team, Imus SV Squad moved from Imus, Cavite to Biñan, Laguna and were renamed to Biñan Tatak Gel. The Imus Agimat took over the spot vacated by the former Imus franchise.
- In 2026, MPBL team, Muntinlupa Cagers moved from Muntinlupa to southern Bulacan and were renamed to the Meycauayan Marilao Gems.

=== South Korea ===
==== Association football ====
Football club moves were frequent in the 1980s and 1990s. South Korea has three national tiers, but as in the North American system, there was initially no promotion or relegation between them.

There were three professional football clubs Ilhwa Chunma (currently Seongnam FC), LG Cheetahs (currently FC Seoul), Yukong Elephants (currently Jeju United) in Seoul by 1995. However, due to K League's decentralization policy, these three clubs were forced to move to other cities in 1996, changing their name in the process. These moves are done under the accord that if any of these teams build a football specific stadium in Seoul, they can return there, of which two clubs took advantage of. As a result, the following moves occurred:

- Ilhwa Chunma became Cheonan Ilhwa Chunma based in Cheonan, 95 km away. In 2000, Cheonan Ilhwa Chunma moved from Cheonan to Seongnam, a satellite city of Seoul, 28 km away to become Seongnam Ilhwa Chunma.
- LG Cheetahs became Anyang LG Cheetahs based in Anyang, a satellite city of Seoul, 21 km away. In 2004, Anyang LG Cheetahs returned to Seoul, assuming a small part of the construction costs of the vacant Seoul World Cup Stadium and renamed as FC Seoul.
- Yukong Elephants became Bucheon SK based in Bucheon, a satellite city of Seoul, 25 km away. On February 2, 2006, Bucheon's club Bucheon SK was moved by its owner, SK Group, to Jeju Island and the vacant Jeju World Cup Stadium, without notice, and rechristened Jeju United
- In 2003, Sangmu FC, founded in 1984 as the football side of Korea Armed Forces Athletic Corps. established a home base in Gwangju at the start of the 2003 season as Gwangju Sangmu FC. The reserve side, Sangmu B, competed in the K2 League from 2003 to 2005 before joining the K League's reserve league, and was based in Icheon for the three years it competed at division 2 level. The club's hometown was moved from Gwangju to Sangju, Gyeongsangbuk-do after Gwangju founded the new professional club Gwangju FC in 2011.

==== Other sports ====
In South Korean major professional sports such as Korea Professional Baseball, Korean Basketball League, V-League, moves were common.

In ice hockey, Mando Winia were a team based in Mok-dong, Seoul, which moved to Anyang, Gyeonggi in 2005 and became Anyang Halla.

=== Thailand ===
- Prachinburi United F.C. in early 2012 moved to Klaeng District Stadium, Rayong, Rayong Province after moving from Prachinburi Province. They currently play at the Rayong Province Central Stadium.

== Africa ==
=== South Africa ===
In South Africa most football clubs are privately owned, and club moves are relatively common. Several clubs, including top division Premier Soccer League clubs have moved and taken on new identities. There are many other cases of South African moves. The ease of selling and buying of club licences make moves common and sometimes difficult to determine what determines whether a new club represents an existing one that has moved or an entirely separate new entity.

- Hellenic F.C.'s franchise was sold by the Greek owners in early 2004 to the Ndlovu family, who renamed it Premier United and moved it to Benoni, Gauteng. In 2011, the Hellenic franchise took over the former Blaauwberg City FC, under the management of Mark Byrne. Byrne is looking to revive the quality of the 1970s, to become one of the best youth developments in the country. In 2013, the club acquired a SAB League franchise (South African 4th Division). In August 2016, the club announced that they had sold their SAFA Second Division franchise license to "ensure that we grow from strength to strength in achieving our aim to be the number one youth structure in Cape Town."
- Khakhu Fast XI initially were founded as an amateur club in 1937, and represented the local city Khakhu, located 170 km northeast of Polokwane. Ahead of the 1998–99 season, the club owner Joseph Mapfulagasha, moved the team about 30 km south to the city Mapate, and at the same time changed the name of the club to Mapate Silver Stars. Silver Stars became Platinum Stars as Royal Bafokeng Nation (RBN) entered as the club's sponsor in 2006 and moved the team to play at Royal Bafokeng Stadium in Phokeng. Club name also changed, when RBN bought 51% of the shares in May 2007.
- Makwane Computer Stars were founded in 1977 in a small village of Makwane in an area then known as QwaQwa. They were then renamed Qwa-Qwa Stars before becoming Free State Stars after becoming based at Goble Park in Bethlehem.
- Manning Rangers, based in Durban, declared bankruptcy in 2006. The Fidentia Group purchased the club in 2007 and renamed it the Fidentia Rangers however the new owners moved the club from Durban to Cape Town.
- Nathi Lions was based in KwaMashu, roughly 30 kilometers North of Durban. The team franchise was renamed Atlie FC in 2011 and moved to Ekurhuleni.

== See also ==
- Professional sports league organization
