= Liphapang Mike Mokoena =

South African football administrator

Mike Mokoena
- Born: Liphapang Mike Mokoena; 9 February 1952; Free State, South Africa
- Died: June 17, 2020 (aged 68); Johannesburg, South Africa
- Occupations: Football administrator, businessman
- Known for: Founder and Chairman of Free State Stars F.C.; Founding member of the NSL

Liphapang Mike Mokoena (9 February 1952 – 17 June 2020), popularly known as "Bra Mike, was a South African football administrator and businessman. He was the founder and long-standing chairman of Free State Stars F.C. and served as a founding member and executive committee member of the National Soccer League (NSL).

== Early life and club foundation ==
Mokoena was born in the Free State. In 1977, he founded a football team in the village of Makwane, located in the QwaQwa region. Originally named Makwane Computer Stars, the club was established as a community-based project before rising through the amateur ranks. The club later competed under the names Fairway Computer Stars and QwaQwa Stars. Under Mokoena's leadership, the team gained promotion to the National Professional Soccer League (NPSL) in 1986.

== Football administration and legacy ==
Mokoena was a key figure in the 1985 formation of the National Soccer League (NSL), which became known as the modern Premier Soccer League (PSL). He was respected for his ability to sustain a professional club in the rural Free State, stimulating significant economic activity and sport tourism in Bethlehem and QwaQwa .

In 1994, Mokoena's QwaQwa Stars won the Coca-Cola Cup after defeating Hellenic F.C 3–2 in the final, with striker Bunene Ngaduane finishing as the top scorer of the tournament. In 2002, Mokoena sold the QwaQwa Stars franchise back to the PSL to assist in reducing fixture congestion. However, he revived the brand in 2003 by purchasing the status of the National First Division side Ratanang Maholosiane, renaming it Free State Stars. The club won the Nedbank Cup in 2018 after defeating Maritzburg United 1–0 in Cape Town.

== Death and succession ==
Mokoena died on 17 June 2020 at a hospital in Johannesburg following a ten-year battle with colorectal cancer. Following his death, the club was managed by his son, Rantsi Mokoena. In August 2022, the Mokoena family sold the club's National First Division status to Casric Stars, effectively ending the 45-year tenure of the Mokoena legacy in professional South African football.

== Honors ==
- Nedbank Cup: 2017
- Coca-Cola Cup: 1994
- National First Division (Mvela Golden League): 2004–05, 2006–07
- NSL Second Division: 1985
- Baymed Cup: 2006
