= Goodman House =

Goodman House may refer to:

- George E. Goodman Jr. House, Napa, California, listed on the NRHP in Napa County, California
- George E. Goodman Mansion, Napa, California, listed on the NRHP in Napa County, California
- Timothy Goodman House, West Hartford, Connecticut, NRHP-listed, in Hartford County
- J.W. Goodman House, Shelbyville, Kentucky, listed on the NRHP in Shelby County, Kentucky
- Goodman–Stark House, Louisiana, Missouri, listed on the NRHP in Pike County, Missouri
- Stephen L. Goodman House, Glens Falls, New York, NRHP-listed, in Warren County
- Perrill–Goodman Farm House, Groveport, Ohio, listed on the NRHP in Pickaway County, Ohio
- Joseph Goodman House, Portland, Oregon, listed on the NRHP in Northwest Portland, Oregon
- Goodman–LeGrand House, Tyler, Texas, listed on the NRHP in Smith County, Texas
- Daniel Goodman House, Yakima, Washington, listed on the NRHP in Yakima County, Washington

== See also ==
- Goodman Building (disambiguation)
