= Goodman =

Goodman or Goodmans may refer to:

== Businesses ==
- Goodman Games, American publisher
- Goodman Global, an American HVAC manufacturer
- Goodman Group, an Australian property company
- Goodmans Industries, a British electronic company
- Goodmans, a Canadian law firm

== People and fictional characters ==
- Goodman (surname), a list of people and fictional characters
- Goodman (given name), a list of people

== Places in the United States ==
- Goodman, Alabama, an unincorporated community
- Goodman, Mississippi, a town
- Goodman, Missouri, a city
- Goodman, Wisconsin, a town
  - Goodman (CDP), Wisconsin, an unincorporated community in the town
- Goodman, West Virginia, an unincorporated community

== Other uses ==
- Goodman (title), an obsolete polite term of address, comparable to "Mister"
- Goodman Building (disambiguation)
- Goodman Pool, a public swimming pool in Madison, Wisconsin
- Goodman, the name of the south campus of Madison Area Technical College
- Goodman South, a branch of Madison Public Library (Madison, Wisconsin)
- Goodman (shopping centre), Hämeenlinna, Finland
- Goodman Theatre, a theater in Chicago, Illinois, United States
- Goodman & Gilman's The Pharmacological Basis of Therapeutics, a 1941 textbook of pharmacology

== See also ==
- Goodman House (disambiguation)
- Good Man (disambiguation)
- A Good Man (disambiguation)
