= The Good Man =

The Good Man may refer to:

- The Good Man (film), a 2012 film
- The Good Man (Fear the Walking Dead), an episode of the television series Fear the Walking Dead
- The Good Man (TV series), a 2025 South Korean TV series

== See also ==
- Good Man (disambiguation)
- Goodman (disambiguation)
