= Maxime Cosse =

Belgian footballer

Personal information
- Full name: Maxime Cecil Cosse
- Date of birth: 20 March 1992 (age 34)
- Place of birth: Belgium
- Height: 1.82 m (6 ft 0 in)
- Positions: Forward; winger

Team information
- Current team: RFC Huy

Senior career*
Years	Team	Apps	(Gls)
2012–2013	RFC Seraing		
2013–2015	KVK Tienen	33	(20)
2016–2018	Patro Eisden	41	(10)
2018	Free State Stars	7	(0)
2018	Al-Rustaq		
2019	Strumska Slava	7	(1)
2019–	RFC Huy		
- * Club domestic league appearances and goals

Maxime Cosse (born 20 March 1992) is a Belgian professional footballer who plays as a forward for Belgian club RFC Huy. A two-footed attacker, he can operate in both flanks and behind the striker among other positions.

== South Africa ==
Bolstering Free State Stars' attack for 2018, Cosse was assuaged by his debut in a 2–0 win over Baroka, coming on in the 76th minute for Goodman Dlamini after receiving his work permit.

Upon arrival, the Belgian winger was compared to South African Premier Division foreigners Gustavo Paez and Jeremy Brockie.

On 23 December 2019, Cosse joined Belgian club RFC Huy. In April 2020, he signed a pre-contract with Solières Sport for the upcoming 2020–21 season.
