= Good Men =

Good men may refer to:

== History ==
- "Good men", a self-appelation used by members of the Optimates in the late Roman Republic
- "The good men", self-designation of followers of the mediaeval Christian movement of Catharism

== Music ==
- Now Is the Time for All Good Men, a 1967 American Off-Broadway musical
- The Good Men, a stage name for Dutch music duo Chocolate Puma

== Organizations ==
- The Good Men Project, an American organization

== Other ==
- "Now is the time for all good men to come to the aid of the party", a stock filler text used in typing drills

== See also ==
- A Few Good Men (disambiguation)
- Good Man (disambiguation)
