= Tyrannus Apostolic Church =

Pentecostal church in South Africa

- Country: South Africa
- Denomination: Pentecostal

History
- Founded: 2000
- Founder: Simon Mokoena

Tyrannus Apostolic Church is a South African Pentecostal church founded in 2000 by Apostle Simon Mokoena.

== History ==
The church was founded in 2000 in Qwaqwa South South Africa by Apostle Simon Mokoena and expanded to an estimated 1 million members to date.
