= Walter "Mazinyo" Matitta =

Walter Mazinyo Matitta
- Born: 1885
- Died: 1935 (aged 49–50)
- Spouse: Alice Lefela
- Children: Marita and Maria

Walter Mazinyo Matitta Phakoa was a prophet, well known amongst the Basotho in the Free State; although he was born a Hlubi. He is well known for healing people through prayer (thapelo) and one of his mysteries was being born with a full set of teeth which disappeared a few days later. His spring in Qwaqwa is still one of the most visited spaces for spiritual healing.

== Early life ==
Walter “Mazinyo” Matitta Phakoa was born in 1885 in Berea at a village called Ha Motsoene - Lesotho. This place was inhabited by AmaHlubi and AmaNgwane who moved to the area during the Mfecane/Difaqane Wars. Matitta was one of six children; namely, Sekota, Masoenyane, Thareni, Matitta, Nomacela and Mpharane.

Regarding Matitta's birth, RM Mohono, fellow founder of the Moshoeshoe Berean Bible Readers Church (MBBRC), author and historian, wrote:

  Long ago among Basotho there was a prophetess by the name of Makhetha Mantsopa. She 
  was a Christian. She lived at Lekhalong-la-bo-Tau, today known as Modderpoort. I 
  believe, therefore, that she prophesied in a Christian spirit. A certain Zizi man and his 
  wife, who lived in Lesotho, visited Mantsopa with their teenage daughter. The prophetess 
  told them that their daughter would be married by a member of their extended family. Her 
  fourth child would be a prophet like Mantsopa. The girl was later married by a relative. 
  Her fourth child was a boy. He was born with teeth in his mouth so he was named Mazinyo, 
  which means ‘teeth’ in their language.[2]

== Life as a Prophet ==
On reaching manhood, Matitta began to preach the gospel, travelling all parts of Lesotho and some parts of the Orange Free State – particularly QwaQwa. It was around the age of 25 that Matitta became a healer and prophet. He became widely known for his work. According to historian, GM Haliburton, in his book Walter Matitta and Josiel Lefela: A Prophet and a Politician in Lesotho:

   The pleasure loving Mattita was called from ‘the quicksands of sins’. He died and went to 
   ‘where the heaven of the stars meets a higher heaven’ and was questioned by seven men. He 
   was quickly sliding towards Satan - as he tried to block his way at every opportunity. 
   After his release from the clutches of Satan he was taken up. ‘Here a court was assembled, 
   the King on a higher throne, twenty four elders wearing golden crowns around him, four 
   strange creatures each with four heads and five wings, and last of all Moshoeshoe and his 
   war general Makoanyane, the two of them wearing sheepskin 
   trousers[4]

As he related some of his visions, Matitta claimed that he had been in heaven and witnessed God and Satan argue over who he belonged to. While in heaven, he was taught by an angel to read and write. Upon his return, he spent 40 days and 40 nights on the mountain without food. When he returned, he then decided to become an evangelist under the Paris Evangelical Mission Society (PEMS) which was established in Lesotho in 1833.

In 1922, Matitta founded the Moshoeshoe Berean Bible Readers Church (MBBRC), named after King Moshoeshoe I of the Basotho. This church was Ethiopian (African Independent Churches) in nature since it was grounded on a Reformed Confession, as seen in the lifestyle of its members and also having had no formal ties with the mission churches. Due to his work as a healer, Matitta soon gained a great following and became well known for this. He was later requested to live in Qwaqwa by Morena Ramatseliso Charles Mopeli (1918-1962) who was the Chief of the Bakoena in Qwaqwa. His church continued to grow in Lesotho but had however been abandoned by himself when he left for Qwaqwa. He then joined another Christian Church in Qwaqwa (church unknown).

Soon after, he met Alice Mofutsanyana – mother of Thabo Mofutsanyana who was an author, politician and secretary of the Communist Party of South Africa. He soon started consulting people at the Mofutsanyana house. It is however unknown why Matitta had been invited to live in the Mofutsanyana residence. People began to flock their place of residence instead of the church. Matitta then decided to open another branch of the Moshoeshoe Berean Bible Readers Church. Due to this, the reverend of the church Matitta had been attending, sent him police which forced Matitta to hide in Leribe which is a small village in Qwaqwa. He later went to Natal where he became part of the Shembe church.

Matitta later returned to Qwaqwa where he continued with his work as a healer. He then met Mr Leonard Liddell who owned the farm called Bluegumbosch (referred to as Letladi by the Basotho). Liddell had no children and he asked Matitta to pray for him. Soon after that he had two boys who were known by the Basotho as Mafotha and Mabasa. During one of the dry seasons, Matitta prayed to God for a fountain (Spring) which was granted to him and he called it the Spring of Life. He said that any person who drank from the Spring and asked God for anything in faith, they would receive it. The fountain currently is still in Qwaqwa and is now named after him as - Walter Matitta Spring. He used water from that spring to heal people. The spring which he had prayed to God for is provisionally declared as a provincial heritage site in the Free State.

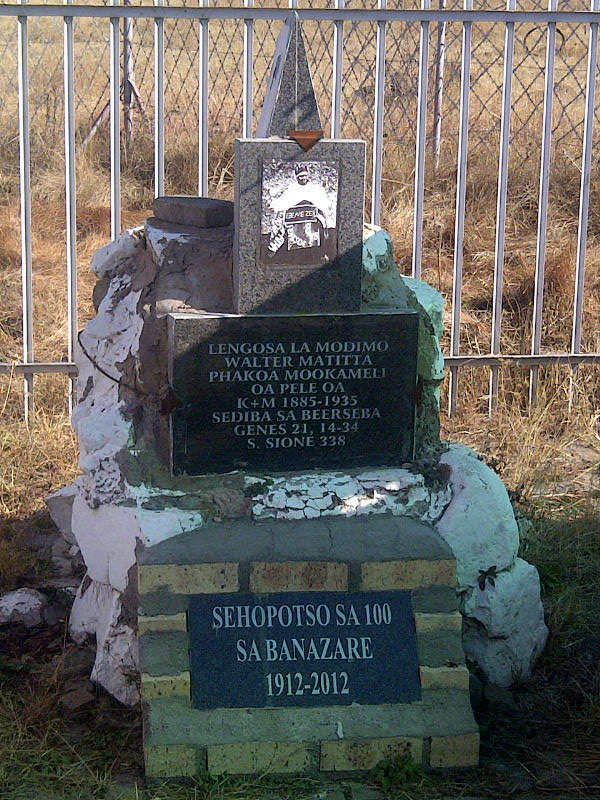
Spring of Prophet Matitta Qwaqwa.

Although at first he had started a church, and also joined one when he went to Qwaqwa, he later decided not to form part of any church and would rather pray for people who needed healing. The church he had founded is still in existence in Lesotho and South Africa and is mostly followed by Basotho, however, there are Zulu people who also attend the church.

== Legacy ==
Through a dream and vision, Matitta is said to have seen his death approaching and where his resting place would be. It was to be in the family ‘ash heap’ some twenty or so yards from his parental home and not in the public cemetery. In the rural areas, a person would be buried in the family yard, but Matitta was divinely given a different space. Some have alluded the significance to the prophet's choice of his resting place to propound the theory that he intended by that gesture to proclaim that place as belonging to the church he had founded and some maintain that this was equally supported by an inscription on one of the stones of the monument in which he placed his two daughters in the ‘trusteeship’ of the church. After his death in 1935, his followers collected funds and built up his grave into a monument.

== See also ==
- Qwaqwa
