= Nkoana =

Nkoana is a South-African surname. Notable people with the surname include:

- Bradley Nkoana (born 2005), South African sprinter
- Maite Nkoana-Mashabane (born 1963), South African politician
- Thabiso Nkoana (born 1992), South African football player
