= Goodman (given name) =

Goodman is a masculine given name borne by the following people:

- Goodman Ace (1899–1982), American humorist
- Goodman Dlamini (born 1985), South African soccer player
- Goodman Lipkind (1878–1973), British rabbi
- Goodman Mazibuko (born 1975), South African former soccer player
- Goodman Mosele (born 1999), South African soccer player
