= Mohammed Anas =

Ghanaian professional footballer

Personal information
- Date of birth: 19 December 1994 (age 31)
- Place of birth: Accra, Ghana
- Position: Forward

Team information
- Current team: Al-Wehdat
- Number: 21

Senior career*
Years	Team	Apps	(Gls)
2014–2016	Maritzburg United	39	(9)
2016–2018	Free State Stars	34	(10)
2018–2020	Polokwane City	45	(11)
2020–2021	Black Leopards	18	(2)
2021	TS Galaxy	3	(0)
2022–	Al-Wehdat		
- * Club domestic league appearances and goals as of 23:18, 15 April 2022 (UTC)

Mohammed Anas (born 19 December 1994) is a Ghanaian professional footballer who plays for Jordanian side Al-Wehdat as a forward.

== Career ==
Born in Accra, Anas has played for Maritzburg United, Free State Stars, Polokwane City, Black Leopards and TS Galaxy. In March 2017, a post-match interview with Anas went viral after he thanked both his wife and his girlfriend. He later stated that his 'girlfriend' was referring to his daughter.

In November 2021, he was released by TS Galaxy after teammates complained that he was bringing "bad luck" to the team.

He signed for Al-Wehdat for the 2022 season.

He scored his first goal for Al-Wehdat in a 5–2 loss against Al Sadd in the 2022 AFC Champions League.

== Honours ==
Free State Stars

- Nedbank Cup: 2017–18
