= 151 Battalion =

151 SA Infantry Battalion
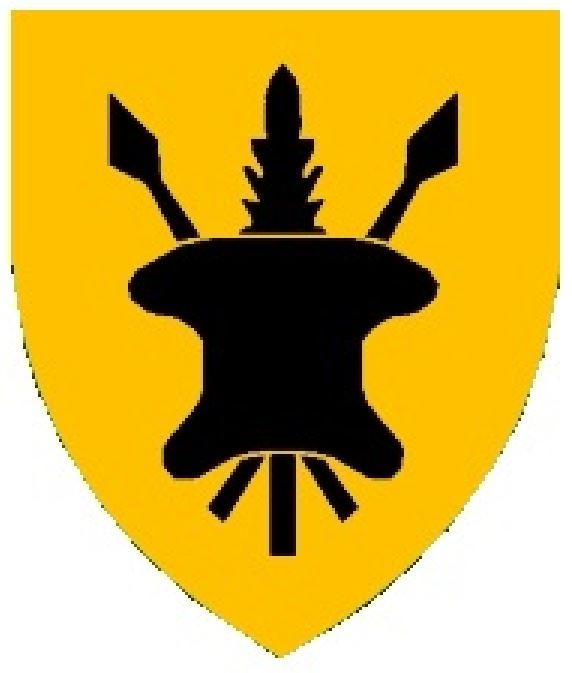
- 151 SA Infantry Battalion emblem
- Active: 1980–1994
- Country: South Africa
- Branch: South African Army
- Type: Motorised infantry
- Part of: South African Army Infantry Corps
- Garrison/HQ: Phuthaditjhaba
- Motto: “Kopano”
- Equipment: Buffel APC, Samil 20

Insignia
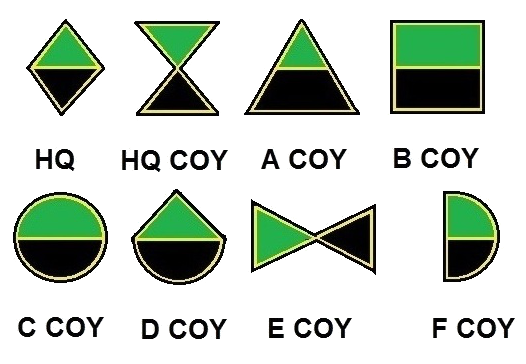
- Company level insignia

- SA Motorised Infantry beret bar circa 1992: SA Motorised Infantry beret bar

151 South African Infantry Battalion was a motorised infantry unit of the South African Army.

== History ==
=== Origin of the black battalions ===
By the late 1970s the South African government had abandoned its opposition to arming black soldiers.

By early 1979, the government approved a plan to form a number of regional African battalions, each with a particular ethnic identity, which would either serve in their homelands or under regional SADF commands.

This led to the formation of 151 Battalion for the Southern Sothos.

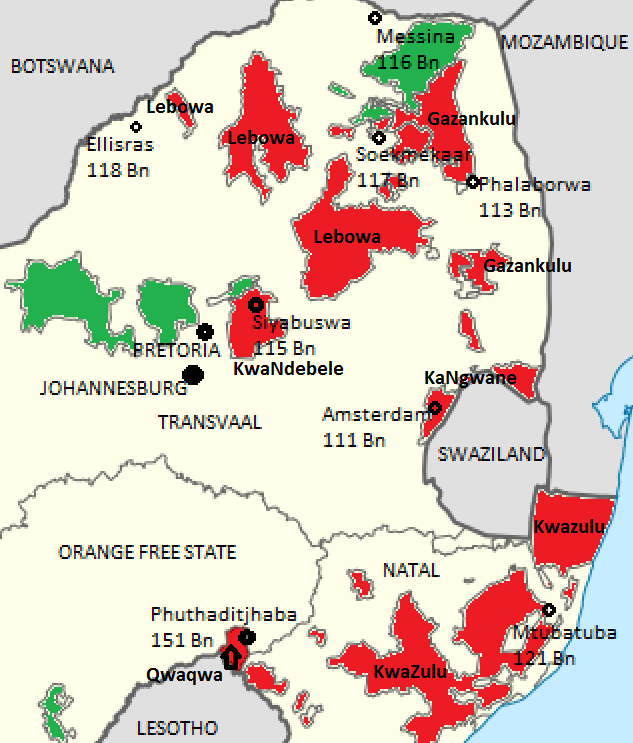
Location of the 100 Battalions in relation to their respective homelands

Troops for 151 SA Battalion were recruited from the self-governing territory of Qwaqwa.

=== Higher Command ===
151 Battalion resorted under the command of Group 36.

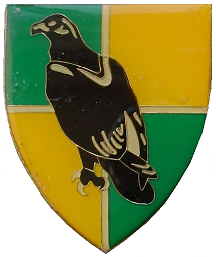
SADF Group 36 emblem

The battalion was responsible for patrolling the border between Lesotho and South Africa.

=== Disbandment ===
151 SA Battalion was disbanded around 1994 and members were assimilated into 1 South African Infantry Battalion and the new SANDF.

== Insignia ==
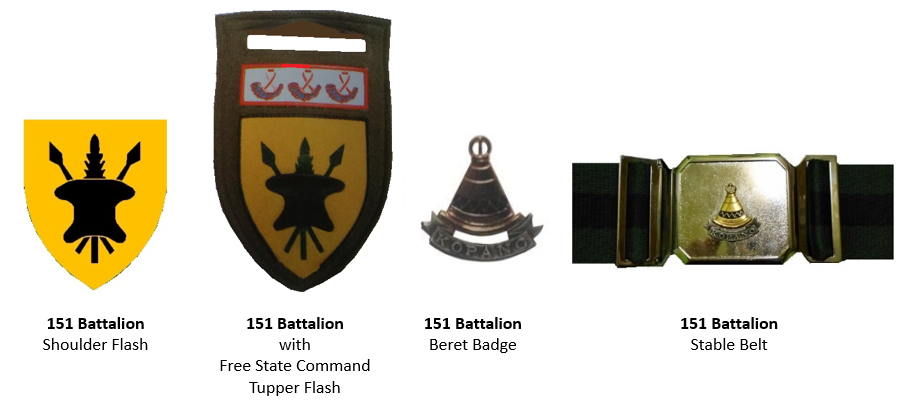
SADF 151 SA Battalion complete insignia

== Notes ==
Peled, A. A question of Loyalty Military Manpower Policy in Multiethinic States, Cornell University Press, 1998, ISBN 0-8014-3239-1 Chapter 2: South Africa: From Exclusion to Inclusion
