= Van Heerden =

van Heerden is a common Afrikaans surname. Although most van Heerdens are South African nationals, a number are also resident in Australia, Namibia, the Netherlands and the United Kingdom.

== Family history ==
The family progenitor, Pieter Willemsz van Heerden, was born 10 December 1677 in the town of Heerde in Gelderland, a province in the Netherlands. It is not possible to trace him or his ancestors in the Netherlands as the baptism records during the 17th century only reflected the name of the child and first name of the father. He arrived during 1701 in Cape Town. He was 20 years old and was employed as a soldier in the service of the Dutch East Indies Company (Vereenigde Oost-Indische Compagnie, VOC). He served his time with the company and became a Vryburger (Free Citizen). Pieter Willemsz quickly became Pieter Willem as he is referred to in all the documents of the time.

Pieter Willem settled on the farm Weltevreden, one of the first farmers In ’T Land van Waveren, Tulbagh. He lived there until his death in 1763, aged 86. On 18 September 1708, Pieter Willem married 17-year-old Magtilt van der Merwe, the daughter of Willem Schalkzoon van der Merwe and Elsie Cloete.

Pieter and Elsie had five sons: Willem (born c1709 – died 1769), Hendrik (born c1712 – died young), Jacob (born c 1715 – died young), Jacob (born c 1721 – died 1749), Petrus Johannes (born c1727 – died young). Jacob (c1721) married Anna Jordaan and they had one daughter. The eldest son Willem (c1709) married Martha van der Merwe and they had nine sons and three daughters. They form the nine branches of the van Heerden family in South Africa. All the van Heerdens can trace their roots back to one of the nine sons.

== Notable people with the surname ==
- Alex van Heerden, Jazz musician
- Attie van Heerden, former Olympian, rugby union, and rugby league footballer
- Chris van Heerden, boxer
- Elrio van Heerden, association (soccer) footballer
- Ernst van Heerden, author
- Harry van Heerden, politician and farmer
- Ivor van Heerden, deputy director of the Louisiana State University Hurricane Center
- Etienne van Heerden, poet and novelist
- Johan van Heerden, Romanian rugby union player
- Kurt Johann van Heerden, Singer Kurt Darren
- Mariette Van Heerden, Zimbabwean discus thrower and shot putter
- Moaner van Heerden, former rugby union footballer
- Phillip van Heerden, Rhodesian politician
- Wikus van Heerden, South African rugby union footballer
- Jacobus Willem Schalk "Bill" van Heerden, author (Film and Television In-Jokes)
- Anna Petronella van Heerden (1887–1975), the first Afrikaner woman to qualify as a medical doctor
