= Andréa Fileccia =

Belgian footballer

Personal information
- Date of birth: 6 December 1991 (age 34)
- Place of birth: Mons, Belgium
- Height: 1.80 m (5 ft 11 in)
- Position: Forward

Team information
- Current team: Perwez

Youth career
- Mons
- 2008–2010: Feyenoord

Senior career*
Years	Team	Apps	(Gls)
2009–2012	Feyenoord	0	(0)
2010–2011	→ Excelsior (loan)	8	(0)
2012–2014	La Louvière Centre	44	(10)
2014–2016	Free State Stars	15	(6)
2016–2019	Maritzburg United	44	(7)
2019–2020	Francs Borains		
2021–	Perwez		
- * Club domestic league appearances and goals as of 01:05, 2 January 2020 (UTC)

Andréa Fileccia (born 6 December 1991) is a Belgian footballer who plays as a forward for Perwez.

== Career ==
Fileccia left his Belgian youth club Mons in the summer of 2008 to join the Feyenoord Academy in the Netherlands. After playing for Feyenoord's youth teams for two seasons, he joined Eredivisie club Excelsior on loan. Fileccia made his professional debut for Excelsior on 7 August 2010. He replaced Daan Bovenberg in the 65th minute, but couldn't prevent Excelsior losing the season opening away match against De Graafschap (3–0).

Fileccia joined Maritzburg United on 8 July 2016. He left the club on 20 February 2019.

In March 2021, Fileccia moved to Belgian Second Provincial club Perwez.
