= Naan Sigappu Manithan =

Naan Sigappu Manithan (lit. 'I Am a Good Man') may refer to these Indian films:

- Naan Sigappu Manithan (1985 film), a Tamil film starring Rajinikanth
- Naan Sigappu Manithan (2014 film), a Tamil film starring Vishal

== See also ==
- Good Man (disambiguation)
