= Good Man =

Good Man may refer to:

== Film and television ==
- The Good Man (film), a 2012 Irish film
- "The Good Man" (Fear the Walking Dead), a television episode
- "Good Man" (Girls), a television episode

== Music ==
- Good Man (album), a 2018 album by Ne-yo
  - "Good Man" (song), a song on the album
- "Good Man", a 2002 song by India.Arie from Voyage to India
- "Good Man", a 2009 song by Heavy Trash from Midnight Soul Serenade
- "Good Man", a 2014 song by Nikki Lane from All or Nothin'
- "Good Man", a 2017 song by DJ Khaled from Grateful

== Military ==
- Hans Münch, military officer, also known as the Good man of Auschwitz.

== See also ==
- A Good Man (disambiguation)
- Goodman (disambiguation)
- Nallavan (disambiguation) (lit. 'Good Man'), Indian films
- Naan Sigappu Manithan (disambiguation) (lit. 'I Am a Good Man'), Indian films
