= Dutch Reformed Church, Bethlehem =

Church in Bethlehem, South Africa

Dutch Reformed Church
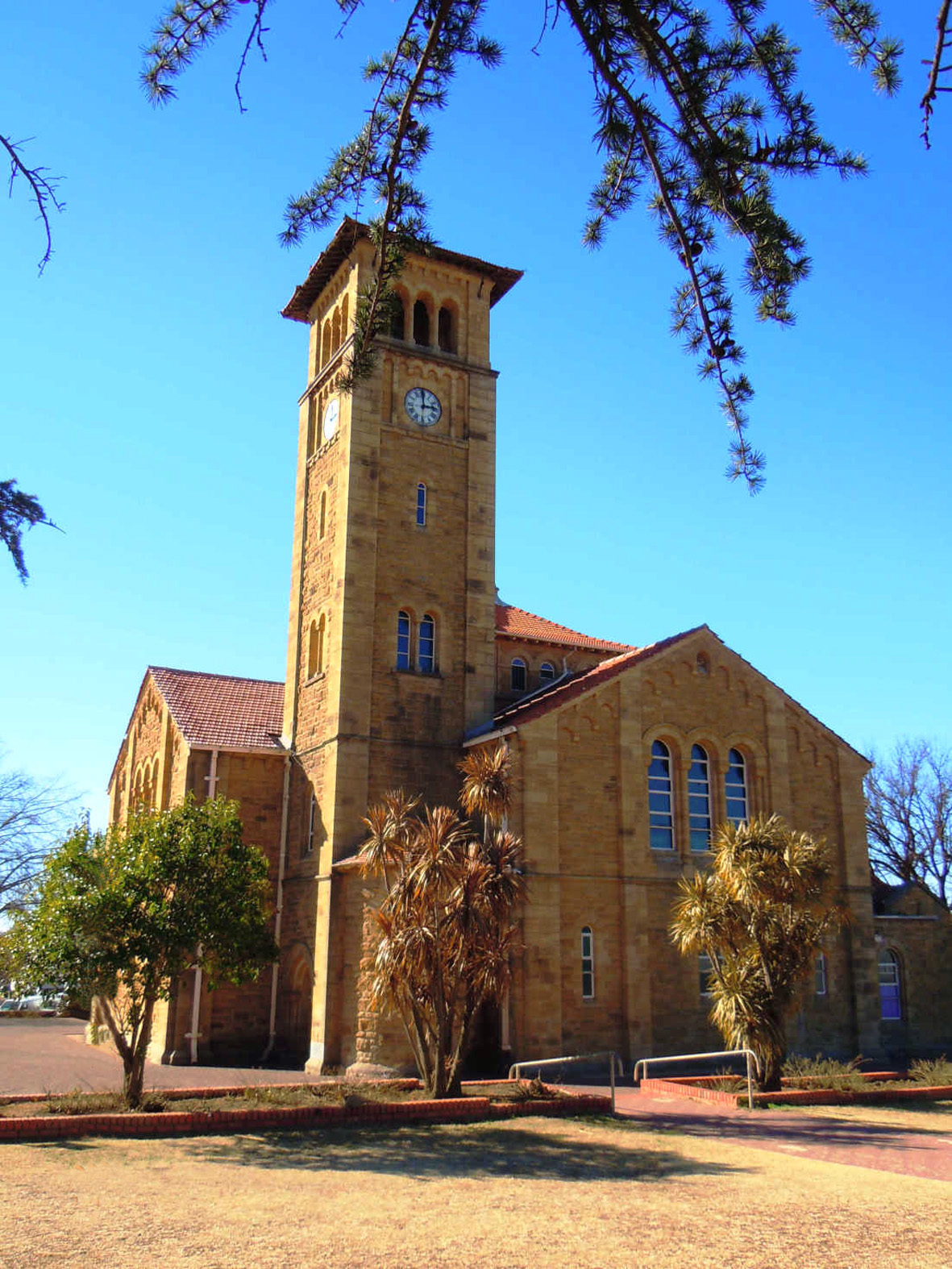
- Dutch Reformed Church
- Location: Bethlehem
- Country: South Africa
- Denomination: Nederduits Gereformeerde Kerk

History
- Founded: 1869

Architecture
- Functional status: Church

The Dutch Reformed Church in Bethlehem was the mother congregation of the Dutch Reformed Church in the Free State town of Bethlehem, but it was incorporated into the Bethlehem West congregation in October 2012. It was the 12th oldest congregation in the Free State Synod. Since its incorporation, Bethlehem's church building has been used for worship services and special events.

== Background ==
In 1869, 10 years after the founding of the town of Bethlehem, the congregation was founded. The former church building, on the corner of Church and Lindley Streets, was used for the protection of women and children during the Basotho War from 1855 to 1868, while a sod ring wall around it, with loopholes, served as a fort for the men at night. On the Church Square stands a monument with the inscription "Battle of Bethlehem, 22 Jan. 1866", in memory of two whites and one Hottentot who died in one of the invasions.

The church was built by three founders of the town, Paul Naudé, Jan Muller and Dail Malan, from the proceeds of the sale of plots. Rev. McMillan of Harrismith was the first consultant and Rev. C.P. Theron was confirmed as the first pastor in 1872. The boundaries of the congregation extended from Zuringkrans to Kestell, west to east, and from Petrus Steyn to the Caledon River, north to south.

Since Bethlehem was originally a church town, it was later transferred to a town government, with the result that even in the fifties of the 20th century the congregation received an annual sum of £100 flowing from that agreement. The first church building, the cornerstone of which was laid on 25 January 1880 by Pres. Jan Brand, was consecrated in November 1882. It cost £14,000. However, this building had to be demolished due to serious dilapidation, and on 12 April 1910 the cornerstone of the current church was laid by President M.T. Steyn. This building also cost about £14,000.

== Ministers ==
- Charles Petrus Theron, 1872–1912 (accepted his emeritus position; died 2 June 1924)
- Daniel Petrus Ackerman, 26 November 1927 – 25 February 1950 (accepted his emeritus position)
- Carel Aron van der Merwe, 1913–1927
- Petrus Abraham van der Merwe, 1955–1960 (died in office; he was 54)
- Jacobus Ignatius Bornman, 1966–1969
- Hendrik Johannes Muntingh Haugh, 1978 – 29 April 1984 (accepted his emeritus position)

== Sources ==
- (in Dutch) Maeder, ds. G.A. en Zinn, Christian. 1917. Ons Kerk Album. Kaapstad: Ons Kerk Album Maatschappij Bpkt.
- (in Afrikaans) Olivier, ds. P.L., 1952. Ons gemeentelike feesalbum. Kaapstad en Pretoria: N.G. Kerk-uitgewers.
