= Paulus Masehe =

South African soccer player

Personal information
- Full name: Paulus Masehe
- Date of birth: 28 September 1983 (age 43)
- Place of birth: Qwa-Qwa, South Africa
- Position: Midfielder

Team information
- Current team: Free State Stars
- Number: 5

Senior career*
Years	Team	Apps	(Gls)
- Free State Stars
- Orlando Pirates
2011	Free State Stars		
- * Club domestic league appearances and goals as of 10 April 2014

Paulus Masehe is a professional footballer for Free State Stars.

Masehe helped Free State Stars win against Maritzburg United 1-0 in the final of the 2018 Nedbank Cup, winning the first piece of silverware since 1994, as well as being named Man of the Match.
