= Nallavan =

Nallavan (lit. 'Good Man') may refer to these Indian films:

- Nallavan (1955 film), a Tamil film
- Nallavan (1988 film), a Tamil film
- Nallavan (2010 film), a Malayalam film

== See also ==
- Good Man (disambiguation)
