= George E. Goodman Jr. House =

- George E. Goodman Jr.
- U.S. National Register of Historic Places
- Location within California Location within the United States
- Location: 492 Randolph St., Napa, California
- Coordinates: 38°17′37″N 122°17′05″W
- Area: less than one acre
- Built: 1891
- Architect: J. Marquis,
- Architectural style: Queen Anne-style
- NRHP reference No.: 93000270
- Added to NRHP: April 1, 1993

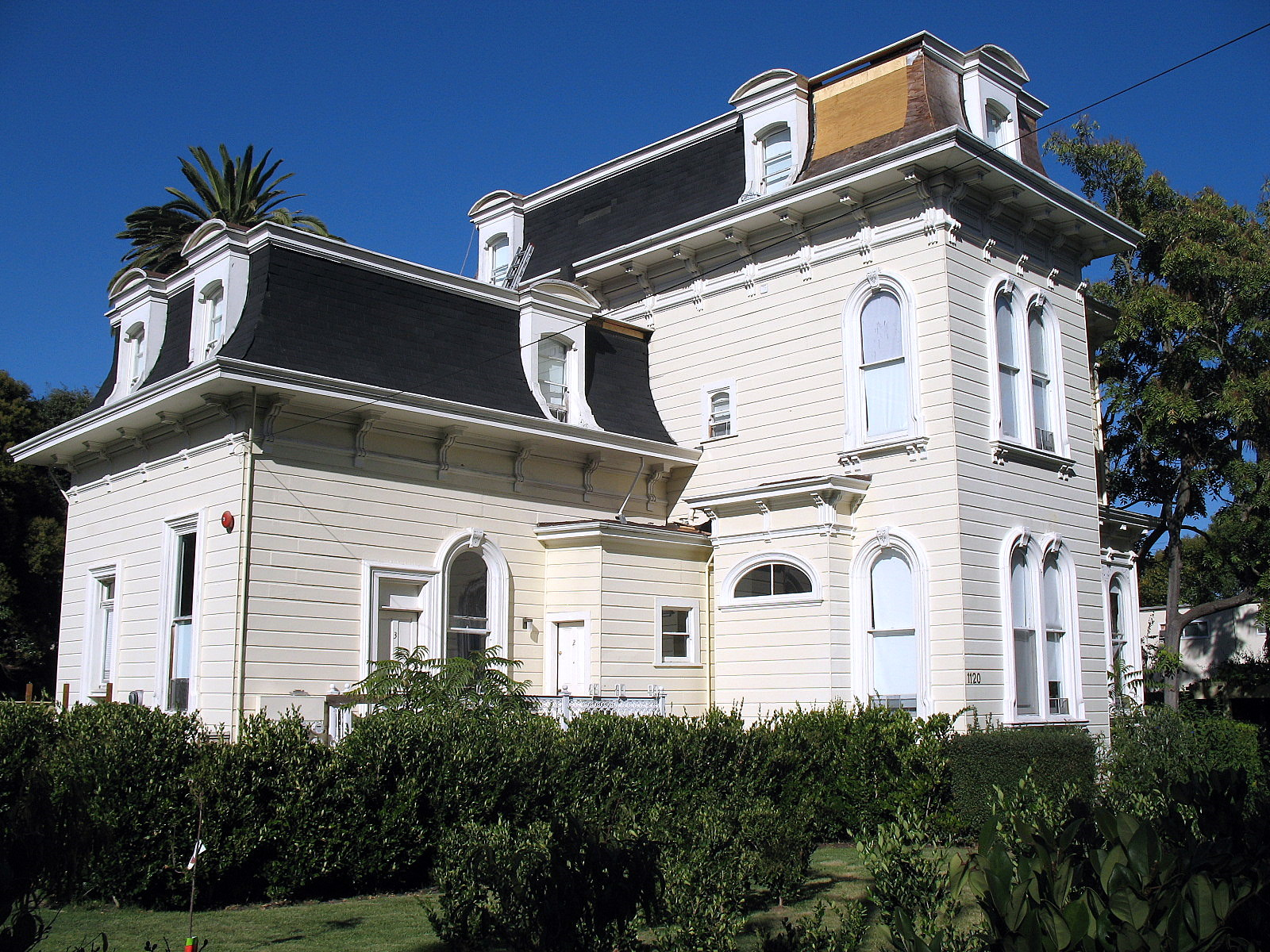
George E. Goodman Mansion, 1120 Oak St., Napa, CA 9-5-2010 4-54-32 PM.JPG

The George E. Goodman Jr. House, at 492 Randolph St. in Napa, California, was built in 1891. It was listed on the National Register of Historic Places in 1993.

It is a two-and-a-half-story Queen Anne-style building built upon a raised basement. It has a corner tower.

Its National Register nomination calls it "one of Napa's most successfully executed examples of late nineteenth-century residential architecture. It embodies the aesthetic ideals of the Queen Anne style through its design and detailing and shows the type of house that attracted prosperous Napans at the end of the Victorian era. It also indicates the growing importance of family rather than personal wealth. When compared with the hundreds of other residences from the period in Napa, the Goodman House emerges as one of the ten or twelve most significant."

== See also ==
- George E. Goodman Mansion
