= Kenneth Mopeli =

South African politician (1930–2014)

Tsiame Kenneth Mopeli

Chief Executive Councillor, QwaQwa
- In office 1975–1975
- Preceded by: Morena Wessels Mota
- Succeeded by: position abolished

Chief Minister, QwaQwa
- In office 1975–1994
- Preceded by: position established
- Succeeded by: position abolished

Personal details
- Born: 20 September 1930 Namahadi, Union of South Africa
- Died: 1 October 2014 (aged 84) Phuthaditjhaba, Republic of South Africa
- Cause of death: Cancer
- Party: Dikwankwetla Party
- Education: University of South Africa
- Occupation: Teacher, radio announcer

Tsiame Kenneth Mopeli (20 September 1930 – 1 October 2014) was the former chief minister of the South African bantustan of QwaQwa.

Born in Namahadi, Mopeli earned a Bachelor of Arts (Hons) at the University of South Africa in 1954 and worked as a teacher and radio announcer for the South African Broadcasting Corporation before being nominated for membership of the QwaQwa Territorial Authority.

Mopeli founded and led the Dikwankwetla Party to victory at the 19 May 1975 QwaQwa elections and subsequently become the chief minister of QwaQwa. He spent much of his time as chief minister confronting the South African government over various issues, most significantly over demands for more territory to be annexed to QwaQwa, and could boast of South Africa acquiescing to his demands, with some adjoining land (albeit small) added to the bantustan.

During his time as chief minister, Mopeli oversaw the foundation of the University of Qwa Qwa, which in 2003 was incorporated as a campus of the University of the Free State; the soccer stadium Charles Mopeli Stadium and the Mofumahadi Manapo Mopeli Hospital were built and opened during his time in office.

Described as "rotund, avuncular and unbending" by one observer, Mopeli ruled QwaQwa until 26 April 1994 when the bantustan was reintegrated into South Africa.

== Legacy ==
TK Mopeli library at University of Free State, Qwaqwa Campus,is named after him.

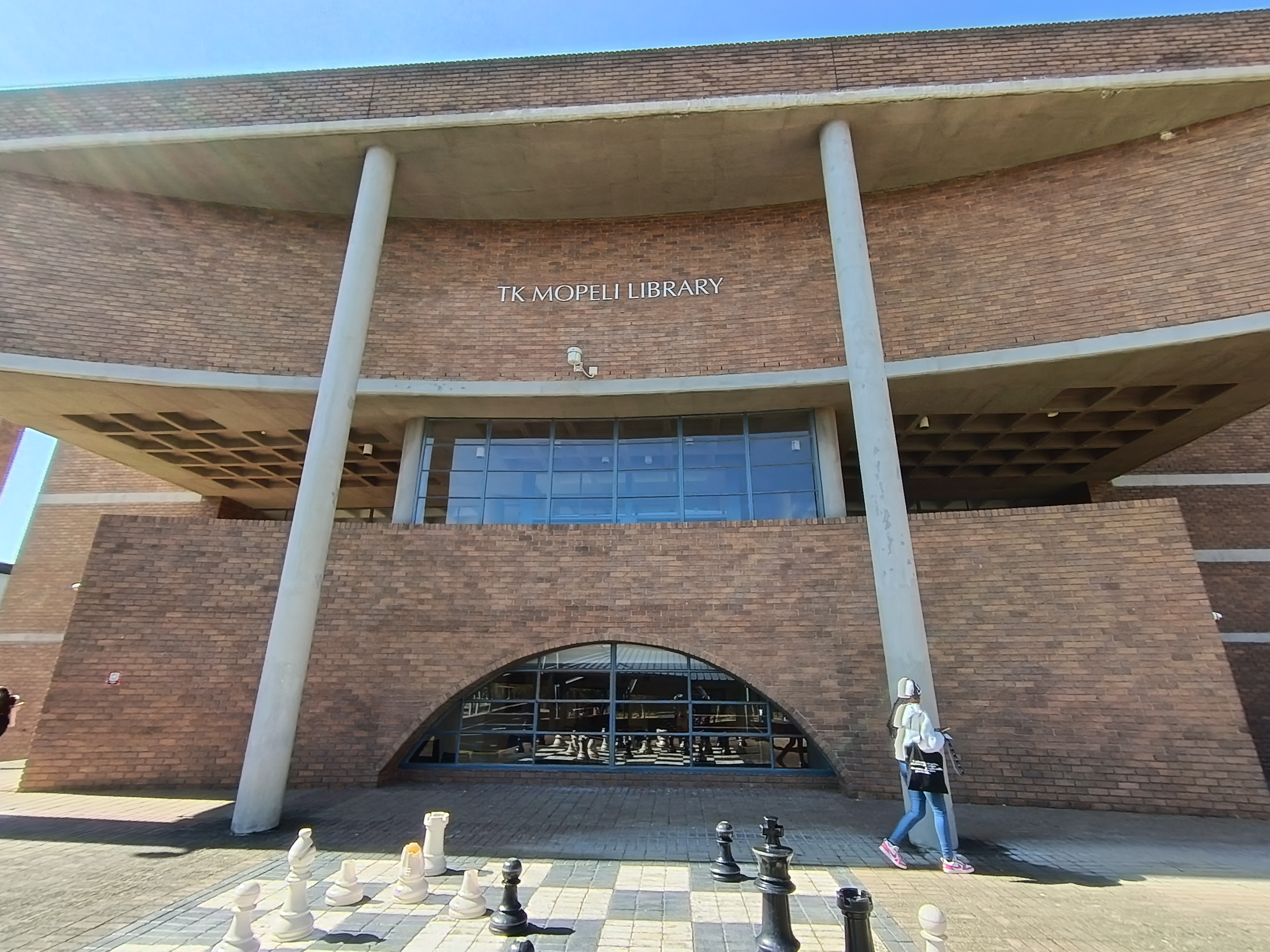
TK Mopeli Library.

Dr. Mopeli died at the age of 84 on 1 October 2014, at Mofumahadi Manapo Mopeli Hospital after a long struggle with cancer.
