= Clive Hachilensa =

Zambian footballer (born 1979)

Clive Hachilensa (born 17 September 1979 in Mazabuka) is a Zambian football (soccer) defender. He comes from the southern part of Zambia and has a sister and two other brothers.

He was part of the Zambian 2006 African Nations Cup team, who finished third in group C in the first round of competition, thus failing to secure qualification for the quarter-finals. Hachilensa is currently playing for ZESCO United F.C. In 2007, he played for IFK Mariehamn in Finnish premier division, Veikkausliiga. He made his debut on "The Islanders" on 4 August 2007 against FC KooTeePee. He scored a goal on his debut to secure his team a 3 – 2 win, and was a popular player among the fans. He was also part of the squad who played the 2008 African cup of nations in Ghana and their team were sent out in group stages. He joined South African side Carara Kicks F.C. in 2008 and is currently at the club.

== Clubs ==
- 2001–2003: (Zambia) Kabwe Warriors
- 2004: (Zambia) Green Buffaloes
- 2005: (Zambia) ZESCO United
- 2005–2007: (South Africa) Free State Stars
- 2007: (Åland) / (Finland) IFK Mariehamn
- 2008: (Zambia) ZESCO United
- 2008–: (South Africa) Carara Kicks F.C.
