= Goodman Mazibuko =

South African soccer player

Personal information
- Full name: Goodman Zemsisi Mazibuko
- Date of birth: 5 April 1975 (age 51)
- Place of birth: Warden, South Africa
- Height: 1.60 m (5 ft 3 in)
- Position: Midfielder

Senior career*
Years	Team	Apps	(Gls)
1995–2002	Free State Stars	?	(?)
2002–2003	Orlando Pirates	19	(1)
2003–2009	Moroka Swallows	120	(3)

International career
2002–2003	South Africa	5	(0)
- * Club domestic league appearances and goals

Goodman Mazibuko (born 5 April 1975) is a South African former soccer player who played as a midfielder. He played for Free State Stars, Orlando Pirates and Moroka Swallows. He also represented South Africa.
