= A Few Good Men (disambiguation) =

A Few Good Men is a 1992 film directed by Rob Reiner.

A Few Good Men may also refer to:

- A Few Good Men (play), 1989 by Aaron Sorkin
- "A Few Good Men" (The Vampire Diaries), a 2010 television series episode
