= Stephen L. Goodman House =

Historic house in New York, United States

- U.S. National Register of Historic Places
- Location within New York Location within the United States
- Location: 65-67 Park St., Glens Falls, New York
- Coordinates: 43°18′27″N 73°38′1″W
- Area: less than one acre
- Built: 1860
- Architectural style: Greek Revival, Federal
- Demolished: 1999
- MPS: Glens Falls MRA
- NRHP reference No.: 84003345
- Added to NRHP: September 29, 1984

The Stephen L. Goodman House was a historic home located at Glens Falls, Warren County, New York. It was built about 1860 and was a five-bay, two-story, gable-roofed vernacular brick residence. It was T-shaped, consisting of a rectangular main block with a two-story brick and frame service wing. It featured a one-story entrance porch and porte cochere. It was converted for use as a funeral home in 1945. The house was added to the National Register of Historic Places in 1984.

In 1999, the funeral home was sold to a local businessman and demolished.
