= Lindokuhle Mtshali =

South African soccer player

Personal information
- Full name: Lindokuhle Praise Mtshali
- Date of birth: 2 March 1998 (age 28)
- Position: Midfielder

Team information
- Current team: Richards Bay
- Number: 11

Senior career*
| Years | Team | Apps | (Gls) |
| 2015–2016 | Real Kings | | |
| 2016–2017 | Orlando Pirates | 0 | (0) |
| 2016–2017 | → Real Kings (loan) | 25 | (4) |
| 2017–2019 | Real Kings | 50 | (10) |
| 2019–2022 | Golden Arrows | 55 | (2) |
| 2022–2024 | Moroka Swallows | 49 | (7) |
| 2024–2025 | Sekhukhune United | 1 | (0) |
| 2025– | Richards Bay | 4 | (0) |
- * Club domestic league appearances and goals as of 4 January 2026

Lindokuhle Praise Mtshali (born 2 March 1998) is a South African soccer player who plays as a midfielder for Richards Bay in the Premier Soccer League.

Mtshali started his career in Real Kings. In 2016 he was signed by Orlando Pirates, but with the condition that he was loaned to Real Kings for another season. He finished with Real Kings in June 2017, and subsequently went on trial with Jomo Cosmos. In August 2017 Jomo Sono announced that Mtshali had signed for Cosmos. Unbeknownst to Sono, Mtshali was still contracted to Pirates, and the transfer fell through. Mtshali claimed he had not been paid any wages in July 2017. He also declined a contract offer. He was released by Orlando Pirates, and instead went back to Real Kings.

In 2019 he moved on to Golden Arrows, and subsequently made his first-tier debut in the 2019-20 South African Premier Division. In the summer of 2022 he signed a two-year contract with the Moroka Swallows.
