= Bunene Ngaduane =

Congolese professional footballer

Personal information
- Date of birth: 30 July 1972 (age 54)
- Place of birth: Kinshasa, Zaire
- Position: Striker

Senior career*
Years	Team	Apps	(Gls)
1993–1994	Qwa Qwa Stars		
1995–1997	Ankaragücü	29	(6)
1997–1999	Qwa Qwa Stars		
2000	Moroka Swallows FC		

International career
?	Zaire		
- * Club domestic league appearances and goals

Bunene Ngaduane (born 30 July 1972) is a Congolese former professional footballer who played as a striker for Ankaragücü in Turkey and Qwa Qwa Stars and Moroka Swallows FC in South Africa.

Ngaduane enjoyed success with Qwa Qwa Stars, and was the third leading scorer in the South African National Soccer League during the 1993 season, scoring 18 goals.

Ngaduane was included in the Zaire national football team at the 1996 African Cup of Nations.
