= Makwane =

- Location within Free State (South African province) Location within South Africa
- Coordinates: 28.549°S 28.878°E
- Country: South Africa
- Province: Free State
- District: Thabo Mofutsanyane
- Municipality: Maluti-a-Phofung

Area
  - Total: 11.78 km^{2} (4.55 sq mi)

Population (2011)
  - Total: 18,550
  - Density: 1,575/km^{2} (4,078/sq mi)

Racial makeup (2011)
  - Black African: 99.7%
  - Coloured: 0.1%
  - Indian/Asian: 0.1%
  - White: 0.1%

First languages (2011)
  - Sotho: 90.8%
  - Zulu: 4.8%
  - Sign language: 1.5%
  - Other: 2.8%
- Time zone: UTC+2 (SAST)

Makwane is a village in the Thabo Mofutsanyane District Municipality in the Free State province of South Africa.

It is the original hometown of the Free State Stars, which were established in 1977 as the Makwane Computer Stars.

In 2014, Sasol established an Integrated Energy Centre in the Makwane, to provide the community with energy services and other amenities. Makwane consists of metsimatsho, phahameng, comet, molapo sekgutlong, tebang and matshekgeng.
