= Goodman Building =

Goodman Building may refer to:

- Goodman Building (Austin, Texas), listed on the National Register of Historic Places in Texas
- Goodman Building (San Francisco, California), listed on the National Register of Historic Places in San Francisco
- Goodman's Buildings, New South Wales, Australia

== See also ==
- Goodman Library, Napa, California, NRHP-listed
- Goodman House (disambiguation)
