= A Good Man =

A Good Man may refer to:

- "A Good Man" (song), a 2006 song by Emerson Drive
- A Good Man (1941 film), an Argentinean film
- A Good Man (2009 film), a Spanish film
- A Good Man (2011 film), a documentary film
- A Good Man (2014 film), an action crime film
- A Good Man (2020 film), a French-Belgian film
- "A Good MAN", a 2021 song from the EP Preacher's Kid by Semler

== See also ==
- Goodman (disambiguation)
