= Ntokozo Sikhakhane =

South African footballer

Ntokozo Percival Sikhakhane (born 28 March 1983 in Durban, KwaZulu-Natal) is a retired South African football player who played as a midfielder for Bidvest Wits in the Premier Soccer League.

He was born in KwaMashu, Durban.

- Joined Wits: 2011
- Previous clubs: AmaZulu, Bloemfontein Celtic, Kaizer Chiefs, Dynamos
