= Anna Petronella van Heerden =

1887-1975 First Afrikaner woman to qualify as a doctor in South Africa

- Born: 26 April 1887; Bethlehem, Orange Free State
- Died: 10 January 1975 (aged 87); Cape Town, South Africa
- Education: University of Amsterdam
- Known for: first Afrikaner woman to qualify as a medical doctor
- Scientific career
- Fields: Gynecology
- Workplaces: Private practice South African medical corps (WWII)
- Thesis: Die sogenamde adenioma van die ovarium (1923)

Anna Petronella van Heerden (1887–1975), was the first Afrikaner woman to qualify as a medical doctor. Her thesis, for which she obtained a doctorate in 1923, was the first medical thesis written in Afrikaans. She practiced as a gynecologist, retiring in 1942. She also served in the South African medical corps during World War II.

== Education and career ==
Van Heerden was born on 26 April 1887 in Bethlehem, Orange Free State. Her parents were Francois Willem van Heerden and Josephine Ryneva Beck Horak. She was the middle child with an older brother Alexander Charles and a younger brother Frankie.

She was educated at the Huguenot Seminary in Wellington and Victoria College in Stellenbosch. She studied at the University of Amsterdam from 1908 to 1915 where she completed her medical degree. Van Heerden served as an intern at the Volkshuishospitaal in Bloemfontein in 1916 and had her own practice in Harrismith from 1917. She specialised in gynaecology in London from 1921 before returning to Amsterdam to complete her PhD. After obtaining her doctorate in 1923 with a thesis entitled, Die sogenamde adenioma van die ovarium (in English: The so-called adenoma of the ovary), she moved to Cape Town where she practiced as a gynaecologist. Van Heerden served in the South African medical corps during World War II and in 1942 she retired from her practice.

== Other interests ==
=== Politics ===
She served on the main committee of the Cape National Party in 1924 and took an active role in the dispute over the national flag. She also campaigned for women's suffrage and was a member of the Women's Enfranchisement League (WEL).

=== Archaeology ===
In 1931 Van Heerden took part in the excavations at Wadi el Maghara at Mount Carmel in Palestine that were led by Dorothy Garrod.

=== Publications ===
Van Heerden published two autobiographical texts, Kerssnuitsels (1962) (Candle Snuffings) and Die sestiende koppie (1965) (the sixteenth Cup), and other works, including:Waarom Ek ‘n Sosialis Is (1938) (Why I'm as Socialist), Geslagsregister van die familie Van Heerden (1969) (Family Tree of the Van Heerden Family) and Dames XVII (1969) (Ladies XVII).

Van Heerden's memoirs received little academic attention until after 2000. Since then some studies have been made of her limited works. Lizelle Smit presented a masters dissertation on "South African Women’s Life Writing" in 2015 and some of the points relating to Van Heerden covered in this research are: 1) her subtle manipulations of the autobiographical content to convey important issues to Afrikaner-youth of the time; 2) her changing presentation of feminist issues and her lesbian sexual identity, especially in light of the fact that South Africa didn't accept the existence of lesbians for most of Van Heerden's life; and 3) her critique of gender inequality.

== Later life ==
Van Heerden spent some of her later life after retirement working on a farm where she raised cattle. She was often seen at cattle auctions, actively participating, which was unheard of for a woman at that time in South Africa. Van Heerden never married and she died in Cape Town on 10 January 1975.
