= Baymed Cup =

The Baymed Cup was a knockout cup competition for South Africa's 2nd-level football (soccer) clubs sponsored by Baymed Medical Scheme. The competition was played from August to October of each year and includes the 16 teams that make up the Mvela Golden League. The prize money for the winner was R1-million.

== Winners ==
Year	Winners	Runners-up
2006; Details	Free State Stars	F.C.A.K
