= Perrill–Goodman Farmhouse =

Historic house in Ohio, United States

- Perrill–Goodman Farm House
- U.S. National Register of Historic Places
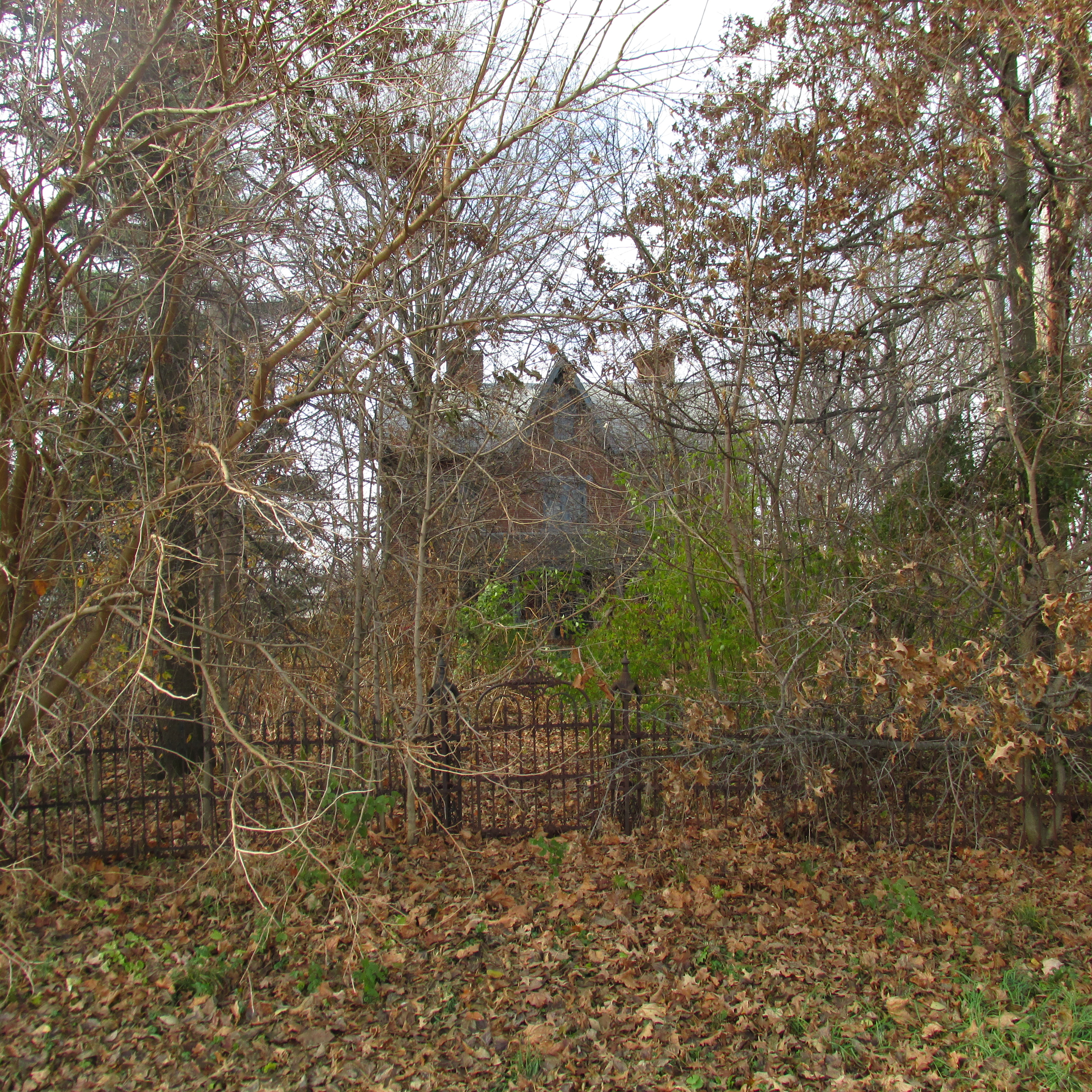
- Roadside view of the house

- Location within Ohio Location within the United States
- Location: Goodman Rd., south of Groveport, Ohio
- Coordinates: 39°47′18″N 82°52′56″W
- Area: Less than 1 acre (0.40 ha)
- Built: 1857
- Architectural style: Greek Revival, Gothic Revival
- NRHP reference No.: 85000565
- Added to NRHP: March 14, 1985

The Perrill–Goodman Farmhouse is a historic farmhouse in the central part of the U.S. state of Ohio. Located south of Groveport in Pickaway County, it has been named a historic site.

The farmhouse was named for two of its prominent early residents, a Mr. Perrill and a Mr. Goodman. Both men held elective office in Pickaway County and served as community leaders in other responsibilities: Perrill was both a Madison Township Trustee and a justice of the peace, while Goodman was a Pickaway County Commissioner and treasurer of Madison Township, and in the early nineteenth century he was known countywide as one of the area's model farmers. Besides going by the names of these men, the property is also known as "Larue Farm."

Built in 1857, the farmhouse is a two-and-a-half-story brick structure with brick foundation and elements of stone. It was built in a time of transition between major architectural styles: elements such as the transom and sidelights around the main entrance as well as the rectangular lintels are typical of the older Greek Revival style, while the cornice with pairs of brackets, the narrow front gable and steep gables of the roof, and the lancet windows combine to remind the viewer of the later Gothic Revival style.

In 1985, the farmhouse was listed on the National Register of Historic Places, along with a single outbuilding; it was deemed qualified for historic designation because of its distinctive historic architecture.
