= Goodman, West Virginia =

Unincorporated community in West Virginia, United States

Goodman
- Unincorporated community
- Location within the state of West Virginia
- Coordinates: 37°41′23″N 82°17′53″W
- Country: United States
- State: West Virginia
- County: Mingo
- Elevation: 650 ft (200 m)
- Time zone: UTC-5 (Eastern (EST))
  - Summer (DST): UTC-4 (EDT)
- FIPS code: 1554580

Goodman is an unincorporated community located in Mingo County, West Virginia, United States. Its post office is closed.
