= Joseph Goodman House =

Historic building in Portland, Oregon, U.S.

- U.S. National Register of Historic Places
- U.S. Historic district – Contributing property
- Portland Historic Landmark
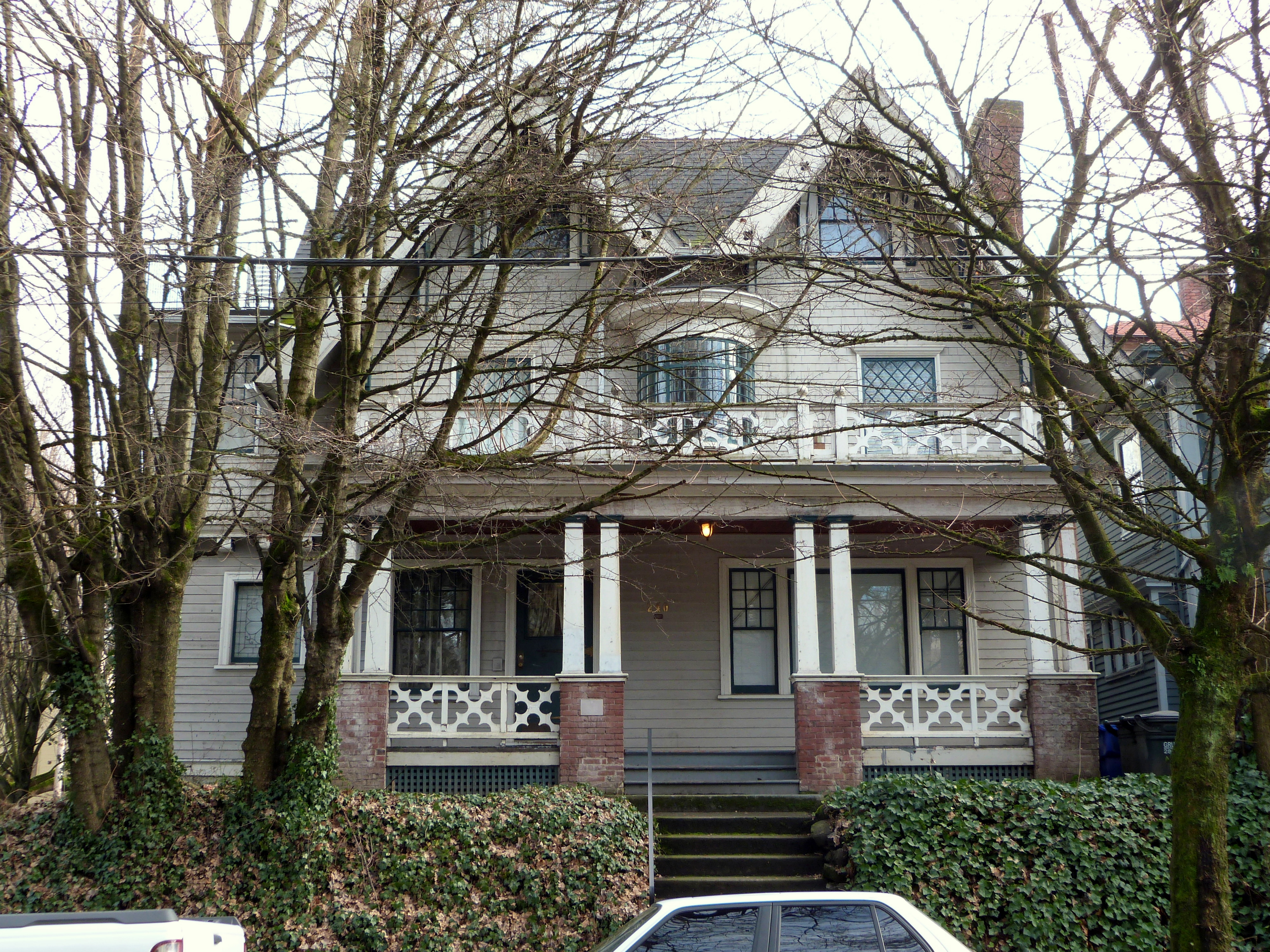
- The house's exterior in 2013

- Location within Portland, Oregon Location within Oregon Location within the United States
- Location: 240 NW 20th Avenue; Portland, Oregon
- Coordinates: 45°31′29″N 122°41′31″W
- Area: 0.1 acres (0.040 ha)
- Built: 1904
- Architectural style: Bungalow/Craftsman
- Part of: Alphabet Historic District (ID00001293)
- NRHP reference No.: 93000455
- Added to NRHP: May 27, 1993

The Joseph Goodman House is a house located in northwest Portland, Oregon listed on the National Register of Historic Places. It was added on the list in 1973.

It dates back to the mid-1880s when it was originally built to serve as a grocery store. The building was built for Joseph Goodman, who was a prominent local grocer. Goodman operated his store in the said building until 1924.

The building's upper floor housed Jacob Bickler's German and English Academy, which was an elite preparatory school and operated approximately from 1892 to 1896.

== See also ==
- National Register of Historic Places listings in Northwest Portland, Oregon
