= Thabiso Nkoana =

South African footballer

Personal information
- Date of birth: 28 October 1992 (age 34)
- Place of birth: Pretoria, South Africa
- Position: Striker

Team information
- Current team: Highbury

Youth career
- Mamelodi Sundowns
- Blackburn
- 2008–2010: SuperSport United

Senior career*
Years	Team	Apps	(Gls)
2010–2014	SuperSport United	28	(2)
2014–2015	Ajax Cape Town	21	(5)
2015–2016	University of Pretoria	17	(0)
2016	Stellenbosch	4	(0)
2017	Thanda Royal Zulu	13	(3)
2017–2019	Richards Bay	27	(3)
2020–2021	Pretoria Callies	24	(2)
2021–2022	Platinum City Rovers	29	(7)
2022–2023	TTM	22	(6)
2023–2024	Venda	8	(0)
2024–	Highbury	3	(0)
- * Club domestic league appearances and goals as of 18 November 2024

Thabiso Nkoana (born 28 October 1992) is a South African soccer player who plays for Highbury as a striker.He comes in with extensive experience, having also represented teams such as Ajax Cape Town, AmaTuks, Richards bay fc,Supersport united,Stellenbosch FC, Pretoria Callies, Platinum City Rovers, Venda FC, Tshakhuma Tsha Madzivhandila [TTM], and the now-defunct Thanda Royal Zulu. Thabiso nkoana is not only a footballer but is now the 2nd vice president of the south african football union,which aims to level the injustices south african footballers often encounter on and off the field.,wh

== Early life ==
Thabiso attended Lotus Gardens secondary school in Pretoria West and he is known popularly amongst his friends and former teammates as Jetro .Thabiso holds an It diploma with PC training now known as Richfield college.He is also a safa qualified Coach

He is the youngest of his 2 siblings and his married with 2 sons .
