= Goodman Dlamini =

South African footballer

Personal information
- Full name: Goodman Sthempiso Dlamini
- Date of birth: 5 May 1985 (age 41) or 15 March 1988 (age 38)
- Place of birth: Clermont, South Africa
- Height: 1.77 m (5 ft 10 in)
- Position: Midfielder

Youth career
- Young Mates
- Clermont

Senior career*
Years	Team	Apps	(Gls)
2007–2016	AmaZulu	164	(28)
2016–2019	Free State Stars	69	(9)
Total		233	(37)
- * Club domestic league appearances and goals

Goodman Sthempiso Dlamini (born 5 May 1985 or 15 March 1988) is a South African former professional soccer player who player as a midfielder.

== Career ==
On 20 May 2018, Dlamini scored the winning goal in the Nedbank Cup final to lead Free State Stars to their first title in 24 years.
