= The Good Man (film) =

2012 film

- Promotional poster
- Directed by: Phil Harrison
- Starring: Aidan Gillen; Kelly Campbell; Thabang Sidloyi; Lunathi Mampofu
- Music by: Tim Milen
- Release date: 12 July 2012 (Galway Film Fleadh)
- Running time: 71 minutes
- Countries: Ireland, South Africa, UK
- Languages: English; Xhosa

The Good Man is a 2012 film by Phil Harrison starring Aidan Gillen. The film premiered at the 2012 Galway Film Fleadh.

== Cast ==
- Aidan Gillen as Michael
- Kelly Campbell as Ciara
- Thabang Sidloyi as Sifiso
- Jonathan Harden as Stephen
- Lunathi Mampofu as Katleho
- Lutando Mthi as Walter
- Lalor Roddy as John

== Plot ==
The film centres on two interconnecting story arcs taking place in Cape Town and Northern Ireland.

== Production ==
Filming locations include Belfast and South Africa.
