= Goble Park =

Stadium in Bethlehem, South Africa

Goble Park Stadium
- Interactive map of Goble Park Stadium
- Address: CNR Muller and Cambridge streets
- Location: Bethlehem, South Africa
- Coordinates: 28°13′54″S 28°18′18″E
- Capacity: 5,000
- Surface: Grass

Goble Park is a multi-use stadium in Bethlehem, South Africa. It is used mostly for soccer matches. It was used as home venue by both Free State Stars and Super Eagles. The stadium has a capacity of 5,000 people.
