= George E. Goodman Mansion =

- Goodman, George E., Mansion
- U.S. National Register of Historic Places
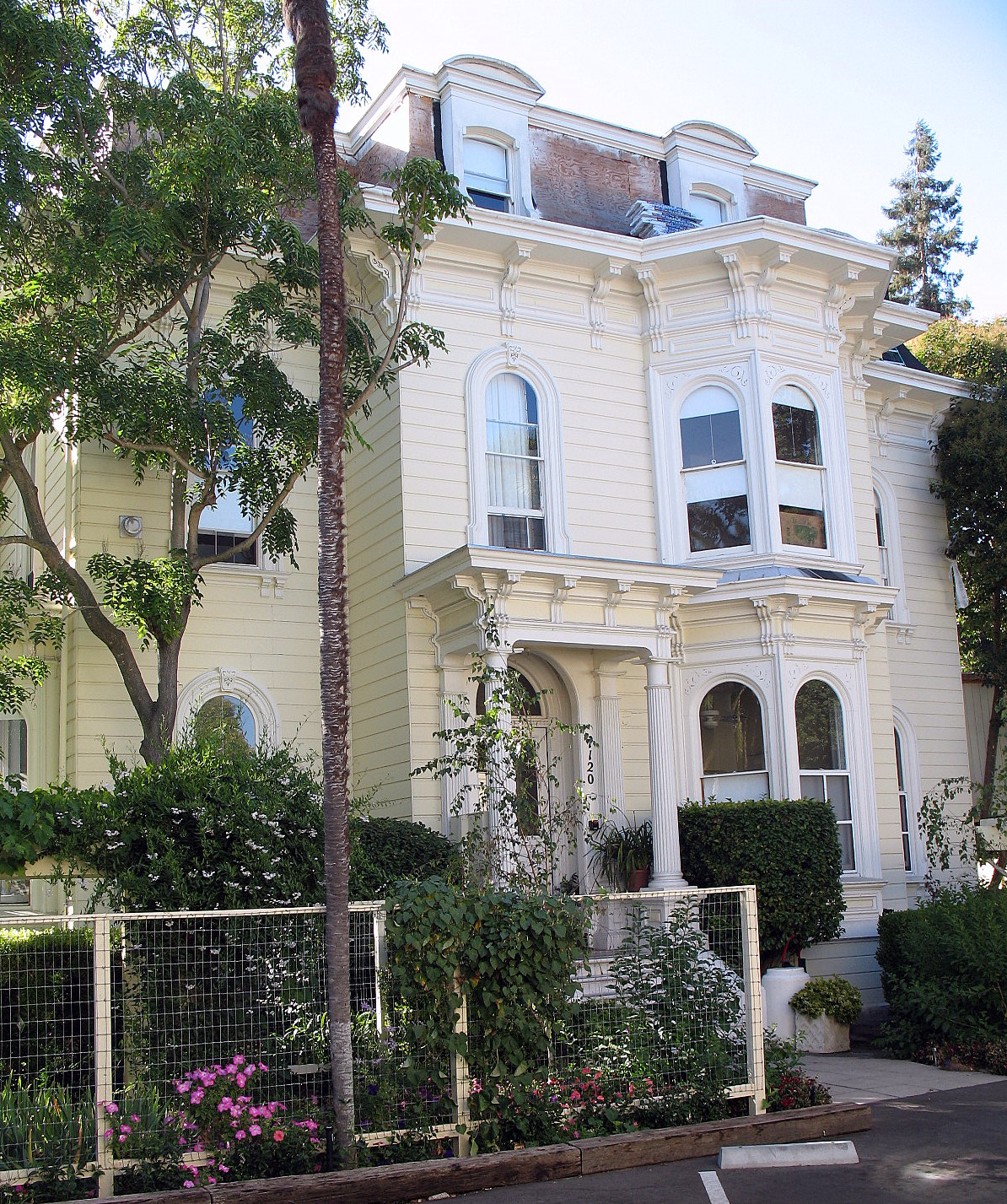

- Location within California
- Location: 1120 Oak St., Napa, California
- Coordinates: 38°17′37″N 122°16′56″W
- Area: less than one acre
- Built: 1873
- Architect: McDougall and Marquis
- Architectural style: Second Empire
- NRHP reference No.: 93000261
- Added to NRHP: April 15, 1993

The George E. Goodman Mansion, at 1120 Oak St. in Napa, California, was built in 1873. It was listed on the National Register of Historic Places in 1993.

It was designed by architects McDougall and Marquis of San Francisco in Second Empire style.
