= Bethlehem, South Africa =

City in Free State, South Africa

Bethlehem
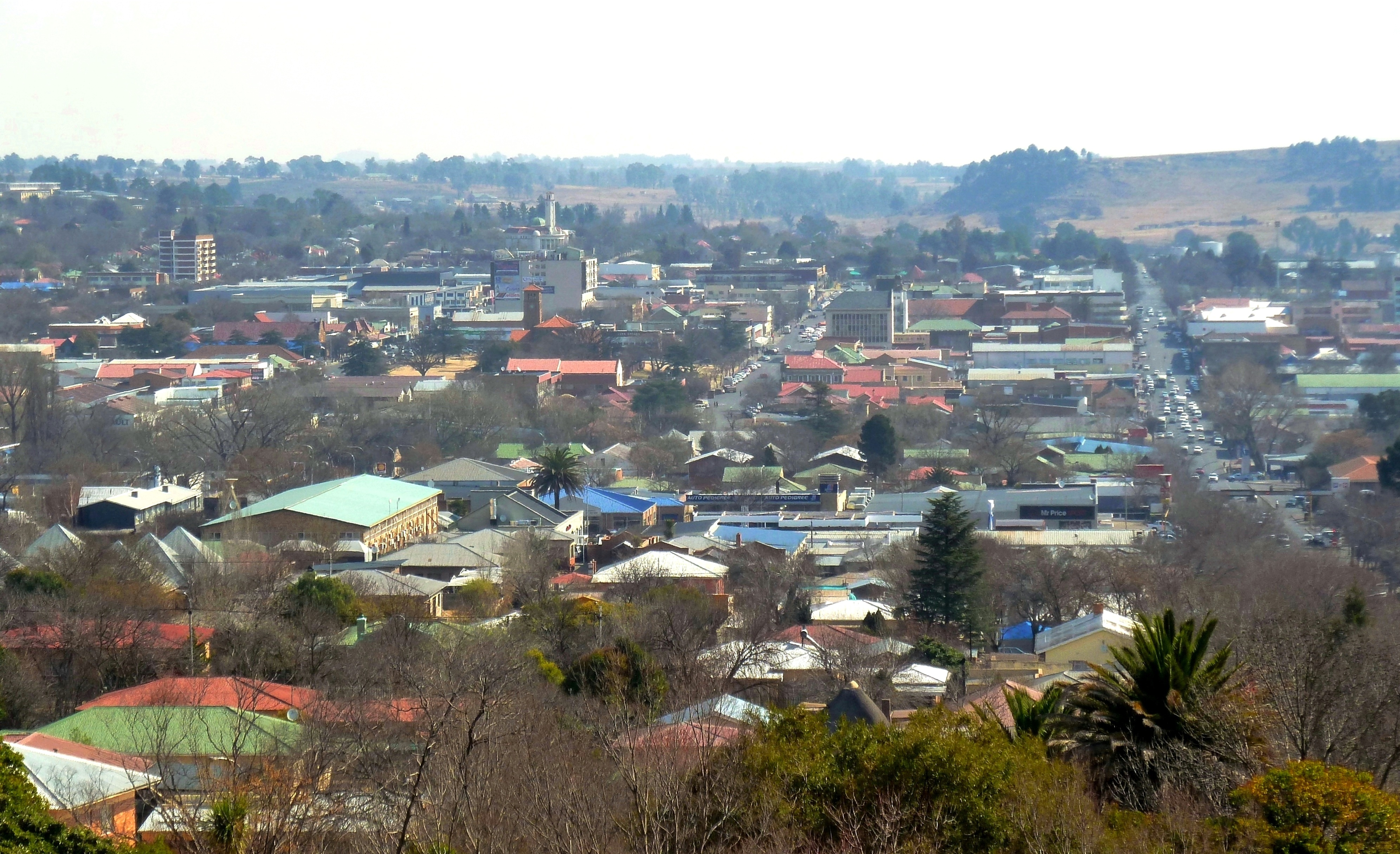
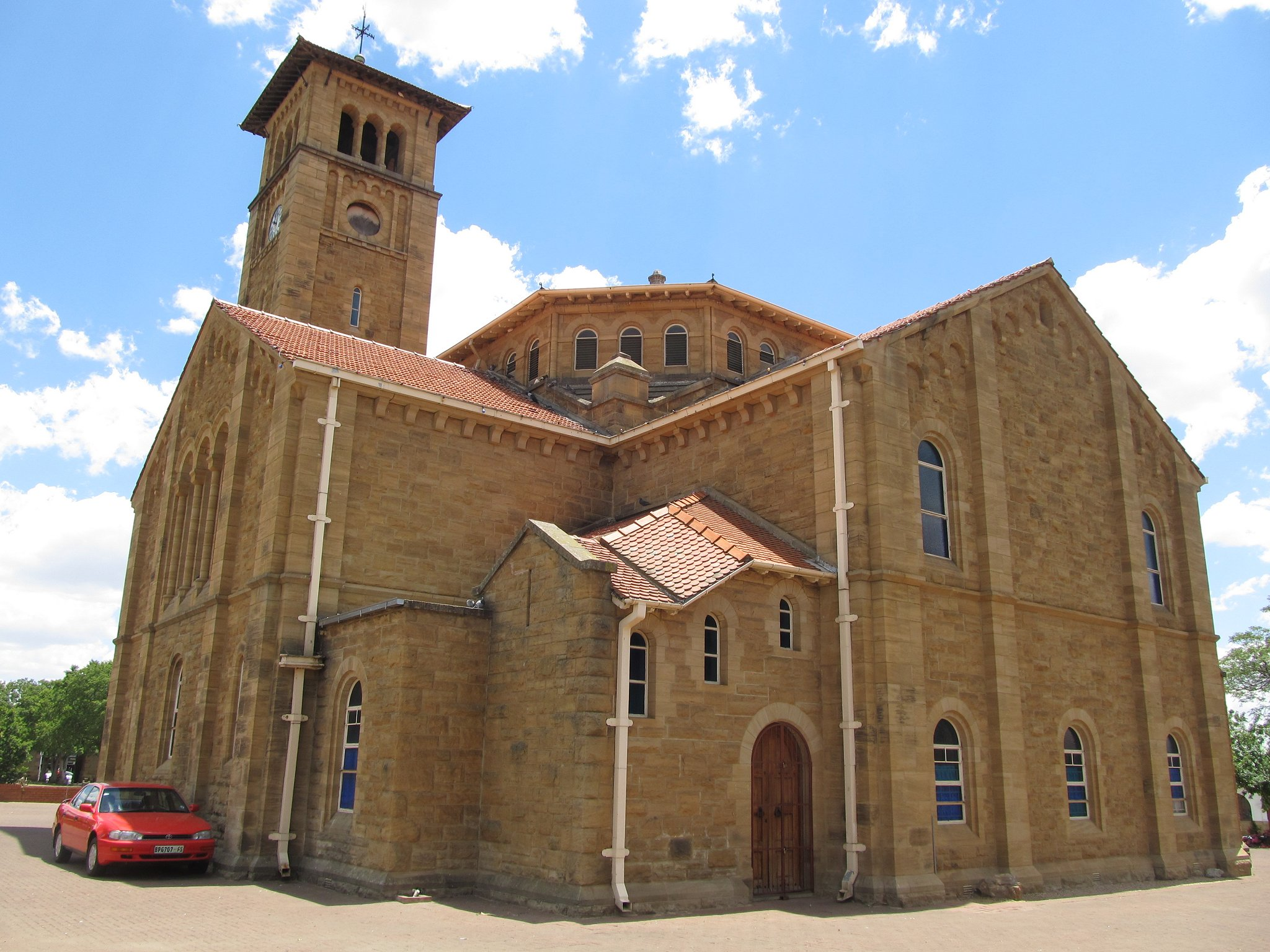
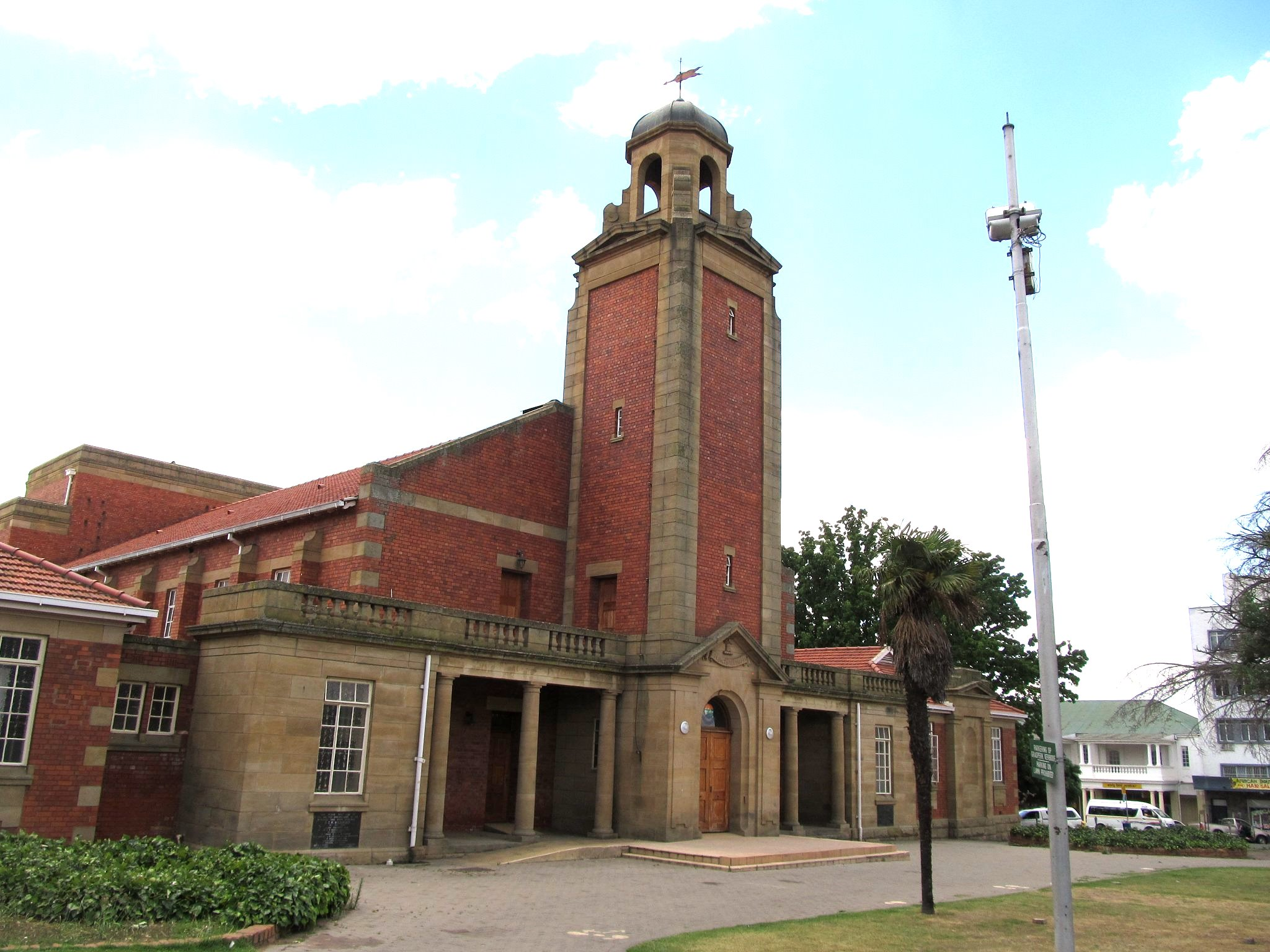
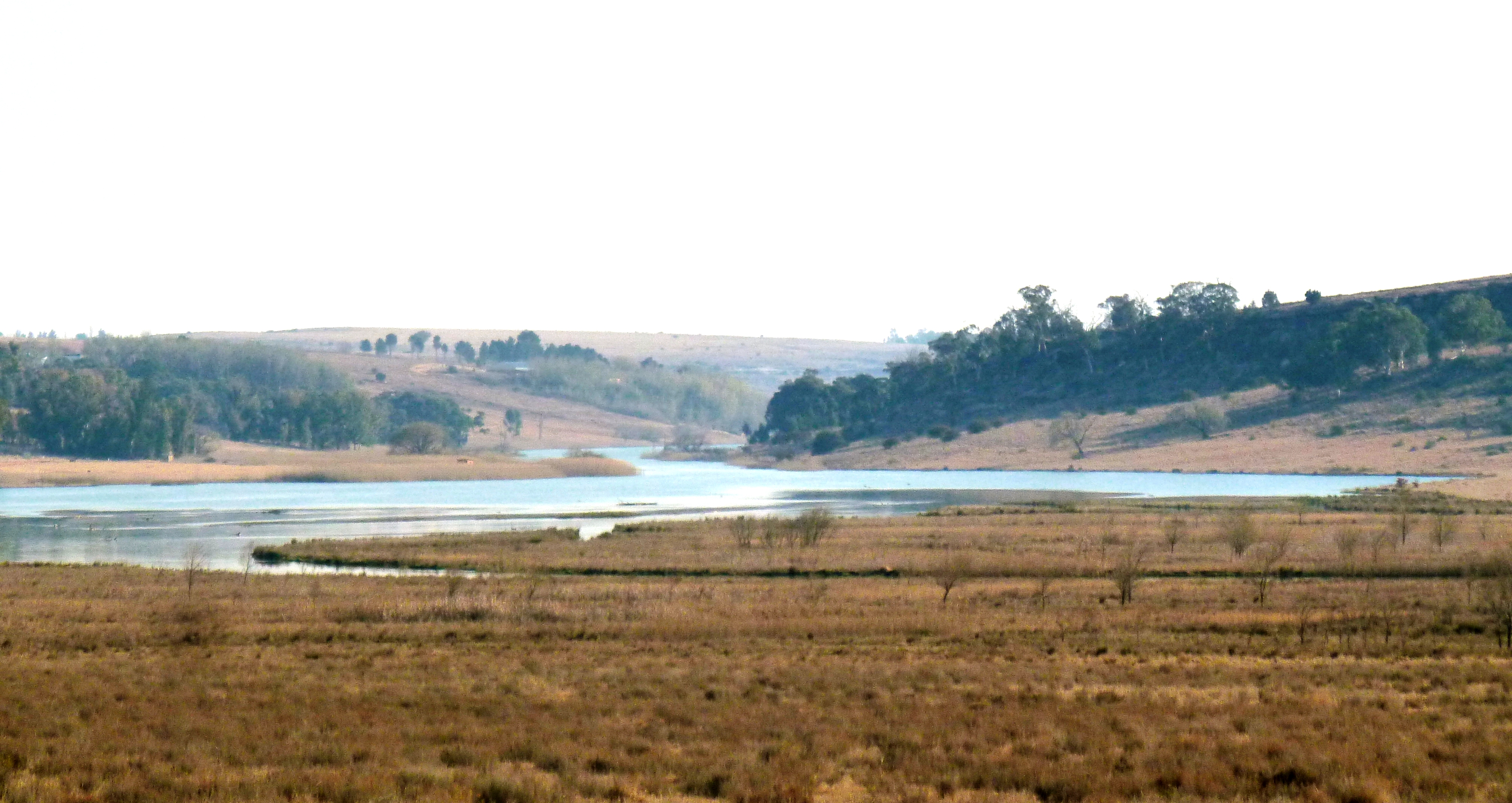
- Clockwise from Top: View of Bethlehem CBD looking west, Bethlehem town hall, Saulspoortdam, Bethlehem Dutch Reformed Church.

- Coat of arms

- Location within Free State (South African province) Location within South Africa Location within Africa
- Coordinates: 28.224°S 28.311°E
- Country: South Africa
- Province: Free State
- District: Thabo Mofutsanyane
- Municipality: Dihlabeng

Area
  - Total: 27.8 km^{2} (10.7 sq mi)
- Elevation: 1,700 m (5,600 ft)

Population (2011)
  - Total: 16,236
  - Density: 584/km^{2} (1,510/sq mi)

Racial makeup (2011)
  - White: 56.0%
  - Black African: 32.7%
  - Coloured: 8.7%
  - Indian/Asian: 2.1%
  - Other: 0.5%

First languages (2011)
  - Afrikaans: 66.7%
  - Sotho: 19.4%
  - English: 7.2%
  - Zulu: 2.7%
  - Other: 4.0%
- Time zone: UTC+2 (SAST)
- Postal code (street): 9701
- PO box: 9700
- Area code: 058

Bethlehem is a city in the eastern Free State province of South Africa that is situated on the Liebenbergs River (also called Liebenbergs Vlei) along a fertile valley just north of the Rooiberg Mountains on the N5 road. It is the fastest growing city in the Free State province, with its target of being the third largest city after Bloemfontein and Welkom.

It is a wheat growing area and named after the biblical Bethlehem, from Hebrew: בֵּית לֶחֶם ("Beit Lechem"), meaning "house of bread".

The city lies at an altitude of 1,700 metres (5,600 ft), which contributes to its cool climate, with frosty winters and mild summers. The average annual temperature is around 14 °C (57 °F).

Bethlehem is situated approximately 240 kilometres (150 mi) north-east of Bloemfontein, 140 kilometres (87 mi) east of Kroonstad and 90 kilometres (56 mi) north-west of Harrismith. The city is strategically situated in the heart of the picturesque north-eastern Free State and originally developed as a service centre.

Bethlehem is the seat of the Dihlabeng Local Municipality, which forms part of the Thabo Mofutsanyana District Municipality.

The townships historically associated with Bethlehem were established under apartheid-era spatial segregation frameworks, which strictly partitioned residential zones along racial lines.

The largest township, Bohlokong, was proclaimed as a residential area for Black African residents, predominantly of Basotho descent. In Sesotho, the name means "place of grass", named after the hloko or bohloko grass (Diheteropogon filifolius) found abundantly in the area. Demographic records indicate that Bohlokong remains overwhelmingly populated by Sesotho-speaking Black Africans.

Conversely, the township of Bakenpark was established under the Group Areas Act as a segregated enclave reserved specifically for Bethlehem's Coloured community. The name is of Afrikaans linguistic origin, combining the word baken (meaning a land surveyor's beacon, property landmark, or boundary stone utilized to mark out the town's expansion from the original farm Vogelfontein No. 69) with the suffix park (denoting a structured suburban settlement). While post-apartheid municipal growth and state-led housing developments have led to increased integration, Bakenpark historically held a distinct Coloured plurality and maintains a culturally diverse, multi-racial demographic profile today.

== History ==
Bethlehem was founded in 1864. In 1900, during the Second Boer War by Henco Cronje, Bethlehem temporarily served as the seat of the Orange Free State government.

The city’s name holds significant symbolism, derived from the biblical town of Bethlehem in the Kingdom of Judah, Ancient Israel, traditionally regarded as the birthplace of King David and, according to Christian belief, the birthplace of Jesus Christ. The founders of Bethlehem, South Africa were influenced by biblical narratives and chose the name in light of their cultural and religious heritage.

== Society and culture ==
=== Museums, provincial heritage sites and memorials ===
A number of heritage sites are located in Bethlehem:

- 14 President Burgers Street
- A B Baartman Wagon House
- Loch Athlone Dam Wall
- Main Building of the Bethlehem Technical College
- Nederduitse Gereformeerde Mother Church
- Old Magistrates Court
- Old Nederduitse Gereformeerde Mission Church parsonage
- Old Nederduitse Gereformeerde Mission Church
- St Andrews Presbyterian Church
- St Augustine Anglican Church
- Strapps Shop
- The Seminary
- Town Hall
- Wooden Spoon Restaurant

== Climate ==
Due to its elevation and far inland position, Bethlehem features a subcontinental and subhumid climate (Köppen: Cwb/Dwb). Large temperature differences are recorded throughout the year. Summers are hot with warm rainy days and pleasant nights. The winters are cold with dry, mild days but frosty nights.

Climate data for Bethlehem, elevation 1,687 m (5,535 ft), (1991–2020, extremes 1980–present)
Month	Jan	Feb	Mar	Apr	May	Jun	Jul	Aug	Sep	Oct	Nov	Dec	Year
Record high °C (°F)	37.4 (99.3)	33.4 (92.1)	34.1 (93.4)	31.2 (88.2)	29.9 (85.8)	25.5 (77.9)	25.2 (77.4)	28.7 (83.7)	31.3 (88.3)	33.8 (92.8)	35.7 (96.3)	36.4 (97.5)	37.4 (99.3)
Mean daily maximum °C (°F)	26.5 (79.7)	26.0 (78.8)	24.5 (76.1)	21.8 (71.2)	19.4 (66.9)	16.7 (62.1)	16.8 (62.2)	19.4 (66.9)	23.1 (73.6)	24.3 (75.7)	25.1 (77.2)	26.2 (79.2)	22.5 (72.5)
Daily mean °C (°F)	20.0 (68.0)	19.5 (67.1)	17.8 (64.0)	14.3 (57.7)	10.7 (51.3)	7.7 (45.9)	7.5 (45.5)	10.1 (50.2)	13.9 (57.0)	16.4 (61.5)	17.8 (64.0)	19.3 (66.7)	14.6 (58.3)
Mean daily minimum °C (°F)	13.4 (56.1)	13.0 (55.4)	11.1 (52.0)	6.7 (44.1)	2.0 (35.6)	−1.4 (29.5)	−1.9 (28.6)	0.7 (33.3)	4.7 (40.5)	8.4 (47.1)	10.4 (50.7)	12.4 (54.3)	6.6 (43.9)
Record low °C (°F)	0.0 (32.0)	1.8 (35.2)	0.0 (32.0)	−4.0 (24.8)	−10.0 (14.0)	−9.3 (15.3)	−12.5 (9.5)	−10.2 (13.6)	−6.8 (19.8)	−2.9 (26.8)	0.2 (32.4)	1.1 (34.0)	−12.5 (9.5)
Average precipitation mm (inches)	129.1 (5.08)	103.5 (4.07)	76.2 (3.00)	45.1 (1.78)	16.8 (0.66)	11.8 (0.46)	7.1 (0.28)	13.6 (0.54)	19.3 (0.76)	70.7 (2.78)	92.5 (3.64)	123.8 (4.87)	709.6 (27.94)
Average precipitation days (≥ 1 mm)	11.5	9.2	9.3	5.5	2.4	1.7	0.9	1.8	2.6	7.0	9.2	11.7	72.7
Average relative humidity (%)	66.1	67.5	67.6	63.9	55.3	52.6	48.9	44.9	42.7	52.2	57.5	62.8	56.8
Mean monthly sunshine hours	264.5	234.8	242.4	243.2	264.7	254.8	273.3	281.8	269.0	264.3	266.5	267.2	3,126.4
Source: NOAA (extremes, humidity - GSOD)

== Shopping ==
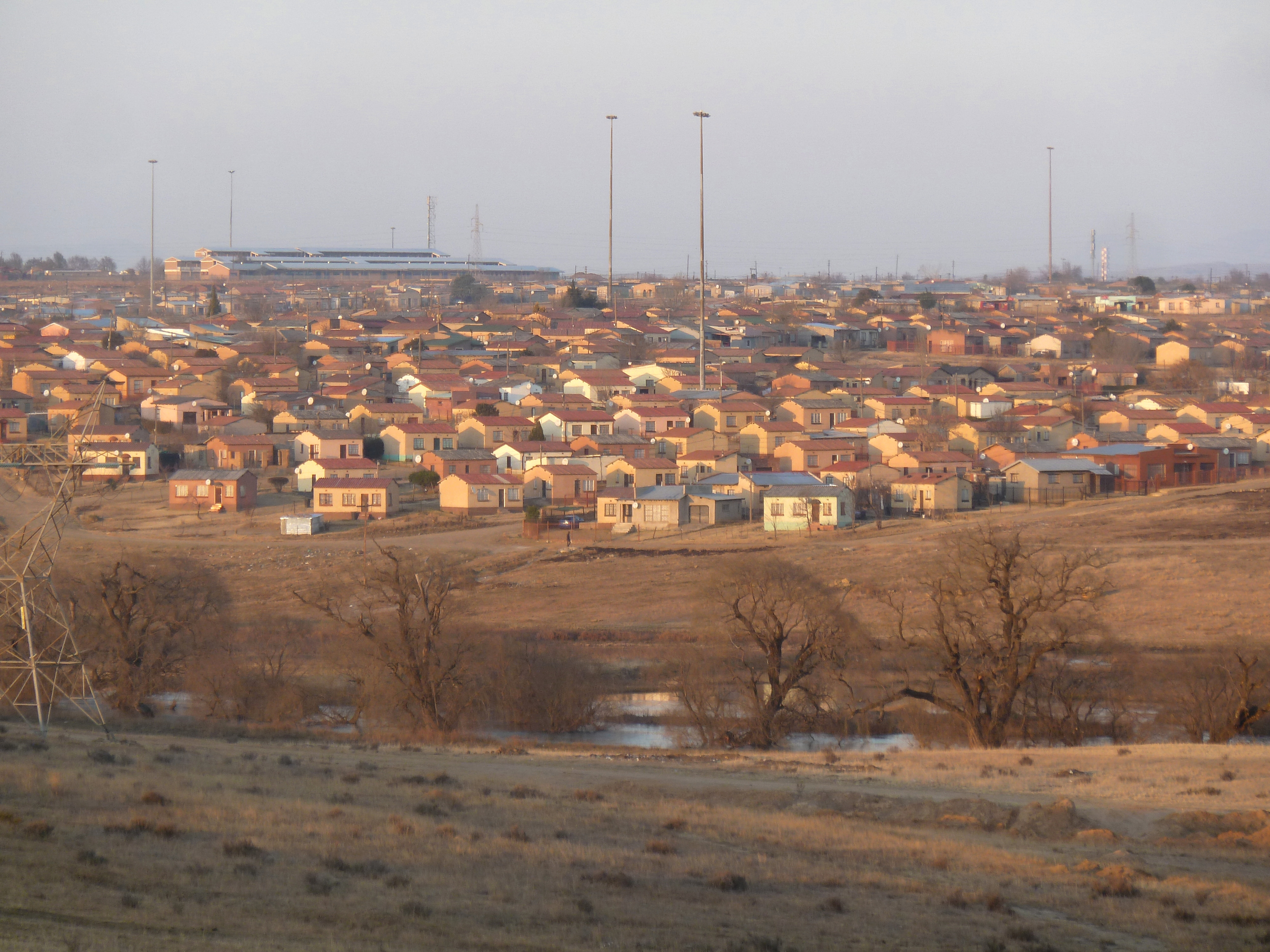
Bohlokong township

Bethlehem has many shopping centres like any other town in the Free State. Bethlehem is the main center of the eastern Free State where people from other towns do their shopping, the main shopping malls are:

- Dihlabeng Mall
- Sechaba Mall (Previously Metropolitan life Centre prior to November 2018)

With the shopping in this town also characterized by typical high street shopping with majority of shops situated along the Muller, Cambridge, Louw, Church, High and other surrounding streets.

== Sport ==
Premiership and National First Division clubs Free State Stars and Super Eagles F.C. were based in Bethlehem and played their home games at Goble Park. Bethlehem is also the birthplace of several notable rugby union players, including Tom van Vollenhoven, Jannie du Plessis, Bismarck du Plessis, Frans Steyn, and Bongi Mbonambi, who was born in nearby Bohlokong.

== Economy ==
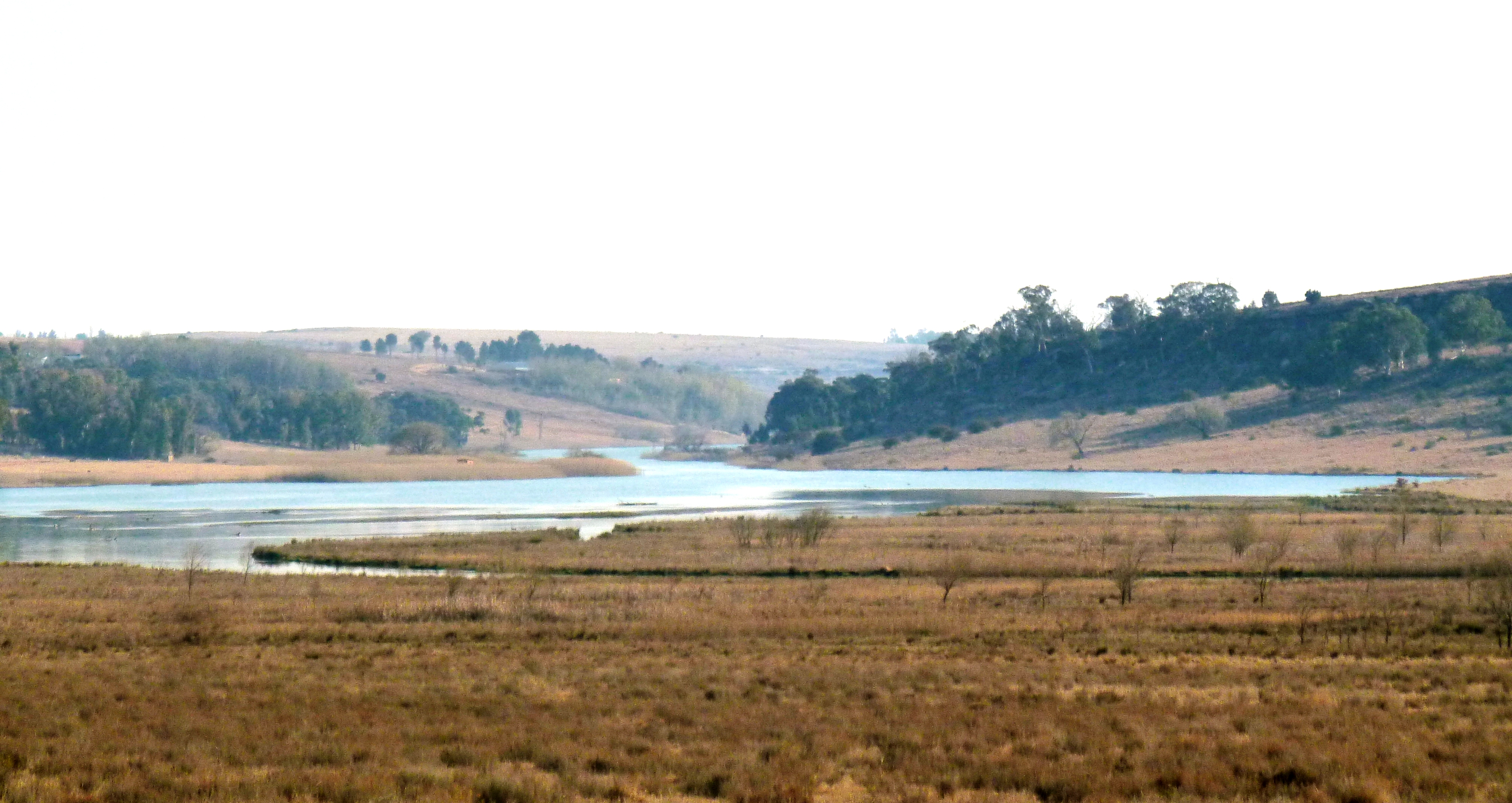
The Saulspoort Dam receives water from the As River via the Lesotho Highlands Water Scheme

Bethlehem is a retail, medical, and educational hub for the Eastern Free State. It has three private hospitals and three star Frontier hotel, Casino and Entertainment Centre located near the Dihlabeng Mall and Bethlehem Aerodrome.

=== Industry ===
Bethlehem hosts several industries including Coca-Cola, South African Breweries and Nestlé, as well as petroleum and engineering companies.

== Transportation ==
=== Road ===
Bethlehem is located on the N5, which connects to Senekal, Winburg and Bloemfontein (via the N1) in the west and Harrismith in the east. The R76 connects to Kroonstad to the north-west. The R26 connects to Reitz in the north-east and Fouriesburg in the south. The R712 connects to Clarens to the south and the R714 connects to Warden to the east.

=== Rail ===
Bethlehem is located on the main railway line between Bloemfontein and Durban. This railway line transports passengers and freight.

=== Air ===
Bethlehem is served by a small airport (Bethlehem Airport) with chartered daily flights to Bloemfontein and Johannesburg.

=== Bethlehem Airshow Fire Disaster ===
On 7 September 2024 a fire broke out at Bethlehem Air show 2024 destroying 30 vehicles. The incident occurred at the Bethlehem Airfield when a spectator left a burning coal unattended. The Democratic Alliance in the Free State accused the Dihlabeng municipality of negligence.

== Coats of arms ==
=== Municipal (1) ===
By 1931, the municipal council had assumed a coat of arms. The arms were registered with the Orange Free State Provincial Administration in October 1958.

The arms were: Party per chevron Azure and Gules, a chevron Or, in chief between two springboks couped at the neck respecting each other, proper, a mullet of the third, and in base three maize cobs, the outer ones pilewise, all proper. In layman's terms, the shield depicted a golden chevron between a gold star and two springboks' head on a blue background, and three maize cobs on a red background.

=== Municipal (2) ===
A new coat of arms was designed in the 1980s. It was registered at the Bureau of Heraldry in June 1989.

The arms were: Per chevron, Azure and Gules, a chevron Or between in chief a mullet and in base two bars wavy, Argent (i.e. a golden chevron between a silver star on a blue background and two wavy silver stripes on a red background).

The crest was three golden ears of wheat with blue stalks and leaves, tied together with a red band; the motto was Conjuncti prosperamus.

== Notable people ==
- Faan Fourie (born 1982), cricketer
- Anna Petronella van Heerden (1887–1975), first Afrikaner woman to qualify as a doctor in South Africa
- Bongi Mbonambi (born 1991), South African professional rugby union player
- Teboho Mokoena (born 1997), soccer player.
- Sipho Mbule (born 1998), soccer player.
- Jabulani Harold Ndaba - Malaika (group) co-founder, singer, songwriter, and vocalist.
