= QwaQwa =

Bantustan in South Africa (1974–1994)

Coordinates: 28.5333°S 28.8167°E

- 1974–1994
- Flag Coat of arms

- Location of QwaQwa (red) within South Africa (yellow).
- Status: Bantustan
- Capital: Witsieshoek
- Common languages: Sesotho; English; Afrikaans
- Chief Minister
- History
  - Self-government: 1 November 1974
  - Re-integrated into South Africa: 27 April 1994

Area
- 1980: 620 km^{2} (240 sq mi)

Population
  - 1980: 157,620
  - 1991: 342,886
- Currency: South African rand
Preceded by	Succeeded by
Republic of South Africa	Republic of South Africa
- Today part of: South Africa

Qwaqwa was a Bantustan ("homeland") in the central eastern part of South Africa. It encompassed a very small region of 655 square kilometres (253 sq mi) in the east of the former South African province of Orange Free State, bordering Lesotho. Its capital was Witsieshoek. It was the designated homeland of more than 180,000 Sesotho-speaking Basotho people.

The frequent snow on the Maloti mountain peaks led the San to call the region "Qwaqwa" (whiter than white). In Afrikaans it was known as "Witsieshoek", after Oetse (also Witsie and Wetsi), a Makholokoe chief who lived there from 1839 to 1856.

Three tribes lived in the region, the Makholokoe, Bakoena and the Batlokoa. In 1969 they were united and the area was named "KwaKwa". In the same year, the name was changed to "QwaQwa".

== History ==
On 1 November 1974, Qwaqwa was granted self-government, with Tsiame Kenneth Mopeli as Chief Minister. Mopeli would serve as Chief Minister throughout QwaQwa's existence.

After 27 April 1994, QwaQwa was dissolved, following the first South African democratic election, and reunited with Orange Free State. It is now part of the Free State province, with Witsieshoek serving as the seat of Maluti a Phofung Local Municipality.

The municipality also comprises the towns of Harrismith and Kestell. Together, they have a combined population of 385 413, of which about 80% lives in the former QwaQwa. The population is divided as follows: 98.09% Black; White 1.68%; Coloured 0.09% and Asian and/or Indian 0.13%.

The place was also a major educational centre in the old apartheid days, with at least 80% of schools in the present Free State province having teachers that were educated in the former homeland. It has a fully functional university, but its teachers' colleges have been turned into FETs (Further Education and Training) colleges. The university was called "Uniqwa" under the University of the North before 1994, but it since has been incorporated into the University of the Free State (UFS) and renamed "UFS Qwaqwa Campus".

The Bantustan of QwaQwa had only one district in 1991, Witsieshoek, with a population of 342,886.

=== Leaders of QwaQwa ===
Dates in italics indicate de facto continuation of office.

Tenure	Incumbent
Basotho ba Borwa
April 1969 to 1 October 1971	Wessels Mota, Chief Executive Officer
Basotho QwaQwa
1 October 1971 to 1 November 1974	Wessels Mota, Chief Executive Councillor
QwaQwa (Self-Rule)
1 November 1974 to 19 May 1975	Wessels Mota, Chief Minister
19 May 1975 to 26 April 1994	Tsiame Kenneth Mopeli, Chief Minister
QwaQwa re-integrated into South Africa on 27 April 1994

== Geography ==
QwaQwa is situated in the eastern Free State province, nestled at the foothills of the Maluti–Drakensberg escarpment between the towns of Harrismith and Witsieshoek. The former homeland covered roughly 655 km² of high-altitude grasslands (1 600–2 000 m above sea level), dissected by steep mountain valleys and the Elands River catchment.

== See also ==
- Chief Ministers of QwaQwa
