= Free State Stars F.C. =

- Full name: Free State Stars Football Club
- Nickname: Ea Lla Koto
- Founded: 1977; 49 years ago (as Makwane Computer Stars)
- Ground: Goble Park, Bethlehem
- Capacity: 20,000
- Chairman: Mike Mokoena
- Coach: Innocent Mayoyo
- League: National First Division
- 2020–21: 5th
Home colours	Away colours	Third colours

Former club crest

Former club crest

Free State Stars Football club was a South African professional soccer club based in Bethlehem, Free State that played in the National First Division. Formerly known as Makwane Computer Stars, Fairway Stars and Qwa Qwa Stars, their most significant honour was winning the 1994 Coca-Cola Cup and 2017–18 Nedbank Cup.

The club sold their National First Division status to Casric F.C. at the start of the 2022–23 season. Following the sale of Bloemfontein Celtic the previous year, this left the Free State without any representatives in professional football.

== History ==
Founded in 1977 in a small village of Makwane in an area then known as QwaQwa, the club gained promotion to the National Professional Soccer League in 1986.

The team won the league cup (then known as The Coca-Cola Cup) in 1994 with Bunene Ngaduane leading the scoring charts.

To avoid fixture congestion the club's franchise was sold to the Premier Soccer League in 2002.

The following year, Mike Mokoena revived the club as he bought and renamed the franchise of National First Division side Maholosiane. Free State Stars regained their Premiership status in 2005 after winning the Mvela Golden League.

After a disappointing season in the top-flight, with the first team finishing bottom of the table, the club was relegated. The 2006–07 season however proved to be a huge success with Stars dominating the First Division and securing promotion to the Premiership once again.

They also won the inaugural Baymed Cup in December 2006 beating FC AK in the final.

== Honours ==
- Nedbank Cup:

Winners – 2018

- Coca-Cola Cup:

Winners – 1994

- Baymed Cup:

Winners – 2006

- Mvela Golden League:

Champions – 2004–05, 2006–07

- Second Division:

Champions – 1985

== Club records ==
- Most appearances: (South Africa) Edward Salomane 299
- Most goals: (Democratic Republic of the Congo) Bunene Ngaduane 79
- Most capped player: (Zambia) Kennedy Mweene
- Most appearances in a season: (South Africa) Themba Sithole 45 (1992)
- Most goals in a season: (Democratic Republic of the Congo) Bunene Ngaduane 19 (1993)
- Record win: 8–1 v Ikapa Sporting (29 March 2008, Nedbank Cup)
- Record loss: 1–7 v Arcadia (31 October 1986, NSL), 1–7 v Mamelodi Sundowns (19 April 1998, PSL)

== League record ==
=== Premiership ===
- 1996–97 – 13th
- 1997–98 – 9th
- 1998–99 – 6th
- 1999–2000 – 15th
- 2000–01 – 6th
- 2001–02 – 11th (bought out)

=== National First Division ===
- 2003–04 – 5th (Inland Stream)
- 2004–05 – 1st (promoted)

=== Premiership ===
- 2005–06 – 16th (relegated)
- 2007–08 – 5th
- 2008–09 – 4th
- 2009–10 – 13th
- 2010–11 – 9th
- 2011–12 – 6th
- 2012–13 – 7th
- 2013–14 – 14th
- 2014–15 – 9th
- 2015–16 – 12th
- 2016–17 – 14th
- 2017–18 – 6th
- 2018–19 – 16th (relegated)

=== National First Division ===
- 2019–20 – 5th
- 2020–21 – 5th
- 2021–22 – 7th

== Notable former coaches ==
- (South Africa) Milo Bjelica (1992)
- (Zambia) Clive Hachilensa (2005–07)
- (Malawi) Kinnah Phiri (1 July 2007 – 8 May 2008)
- (Ghana) David Duncan (1 July 2008 – 18 Aug 2008)
- (South Africa) Owen Da Gama (19 Aug 2008 – 7 Oct 2008)
- (South Africa) Themba Sithole (14 Oct 2008 – 17 Nov 2008)
- (South Africa) Steve Komphela (18 Nov 2008 – 30 June 2009)
- (South Africa) Themba Sithole (interim) (1 July 2009 – 14 Sept 2009)
- (Brazil) Valinhos (15 Sept 2009 – 3 Oct 2009)
- (South Africa) Themba Sithole (4 Oct 2009 – 15 Nov 2009)
- (South Africa) Gordon Igesund (16 Nov 2009 – 23 March 2010)
- (Zimbabwe) Sunday Chidzambwa (5 May 2010 – 19 Sept 2010)
- (South Africa) Steve Komphela (20 Oct 2010 – 1 Dec 2013)
- (South Africa) Themba Sithole (interim) (1 Dec 2013 – 14 March 2014)
- (Malawi) Kinnah Phiri (15 March 2014 – 30 June 2014)
- (Belgium) Tom Saintfiet (2 July 2014 – 6 Nov 2014)
- (Malawi) Kinnah Phiri (7 Nov 2014 – Aug 2015)
- (Germany) Ernst Middendorp (Sept 2015 – Dec 2015)
- (Italy) Giovanni Solinas (Dec 2015 – 23 May 2016)
- (France) Denis Lavagne (22 June 2016 – 22 September 2016)
