= Goodman (surname) =

- Language: English

Origin
- Meaning: 1. as an Anglo-Scottish surname, good + man 2. Anglicized from German: Gutmann, Guttmann (Guttman), Guthmann (Guthman), Spanish: Guzmán, Yiddish: Gutman, Gitman
- Region of origin: Scotland, England, United States, Ukraine, Russia, Spain

Other names
- Related names: Guidman (Old English); German: Gutmann, Guttmann (Guttman), Guthmann (Guthman), Yiddish: Gutman, Gitman

Goodman is a Scottish, English and Ashkenazi Jewish surname, formerly a polite term of address, used where Mister (Mr.) would be used today. Compare Goodwife. Notable people with the surname include:

== People ==
- Abraham Goodman, known as Abby Mann (1927–2008), American film writer and producer
- Al Goodman (1890–1972), Ukrainian-American conductor and composer
- Alan Goodman, designer for MTV
- Albert Goodman (1880–1937), British politician
- Alice Goodman (born 1958), American poet
- Alison Goodman (born 1966), Australian writer
- Allegra Goodman (born 1967), American writer
- Alyssa A. Goodman (born 1962), American astronomer, founding director of Harvard Initiative in Innovative Computing
- Amy Goodman (born 1957), American broadcast journalist and author
- André Goodman (born 1978), American football player
- Andrew Goodman (1943–1964), American civil rights activist
- Anthony Goodman (disambiguation), multiple people
- Arnold Goodman, Baron Goodman (1913–1995), British lawyer and political adviser
- Barbara Goodman (1932–2013), New Zealand politician
- Benny Goodman (1909–1986), American jazz clarinetist and band leader
- Billy Goodman (1926–1984), American baseball player with the Boston Red Sox
- Bobby Goodman (born 1956), American Army captive in Lebanon
- Brian Goodman (born 1963), American actor
- Brian P. Goodman (died 2013), Canadian lawyer
- Cameron Goodman (born 1984), American actress
- Carolyn Goodman (psychologist) (1915–2007), American civil rights advocate
- Carolyn G. Goodman (born 1939), educator, Las Vegas, Nevada mayor
- Charles M. Goodman (1906–1992), American architect
- Charles "Rusty" Goodman (1933–1990), American singer and songwriter
- Chloe Goodman (born 1993), British reality television series participant
- Clive Goodman (born 1957), British royal reporter
- David Goodman (disambiguation), multiple people
- Dic Goodman (1920–2013), Welsh poet
- Dickie Goodman (1934–1989), composer
- Dody Goodman (1914–2008), American actress
- Don Goodman (born 1966), English football player
- Drew Goodman (born 1963), American sportscaster
- E. Urner Goodman (1891–1980), leader in the Boy Scouts of America
- Edmund Goodman (1873–1960), British football manager
- Edwin A. Goodman (1918–2006), Canadian politician
- Elinor Goodman (born 1946), British journalist, formerly Political Editor of Channel 4 News
- Ellen Goodman (born 1941), American columnist
- Felicitas Goodman (1914–2005), Hungarian linguist and anthropologist
- Francis Adam Goodman (1827–1898), German-American politician
- Frank Goodman (1916–2006), American theater publicist
- Gabriel Goodman (1528–1601), Dean of Westminster
- Geoffrey Goodman (1922–2013), English journalist
- George Goodman (disambiguation), multiple people
- Godfrey Goodman (1582 or 1583–1656), British Anglican bishop
- Helen Goodman (born 1958), British politician
- Henry Goodman (born 1950), British theater actor
- Irwin Goodman (1943–1991), Finnish singer
- Ival Goodman (1908–1984), American baseball player for the Cincinnati Reds
- Jack Goodman (born 1973), American politician
- James Goodman (disambiguation), multiple people
- Jerry Goodman (born 1949), American violinist
- John Goodman (disambiguation), multiple people
- Jon Goodman (born 1971), British footballer
- Joseph Goodman (disambiguation), multiple people
- Julia Goodman (1812–1906), British portrait painter
- Julian Goodman (1922–2012), CEO of NBC
- Ken Goodman (1927-2020), educational researcher
- Leisa Goodman, Scientologist
- Len Goodman (1944–2023), dance judge, best known as a panel member on Strictly Come Dancing
- Linda Goodman (1925–1995), American astrologer and poet
- Lizbeth Goodman, British academic
- Louise Goodman (born 1963), British television presenter
- Mariama Goodman (born 1977), British singer
- Marian Goodman (1928–2026), American art dealer and gallery owner
- Mark Goodman (born 1952), American DJ and MTV VJ
- Martin Goodman (disambiguation)
- Melody Goodman, American biostatistician
- Mike Goodman, American professional gambler, pit boss, and author
- Morris Goodman (disambiguation)
- Murray H. Goodman (1925–2024), real estate developer
- Nelson Goodman (1906–1998), philosopher
- Norman Goodman (1923–2019), American politician
- Oscar Goodman (born 1939), American politician
- Oscar Goodman (basketball) (born 2007), New Zealand basketball player
- Paul Goodman (disambiguation), multiple people
- Percy Goodman (1874–1935), West Indian cricketer
- Pincus Goodman (1881–1947), Yiddish language American poet
- Richard Goodman (disambiguation), multiple people
- Rick Goodman, video game developer
- Roy Goodman (disambiguation), multiple people
- Ruth Goodman (born 1961), American romance novelist who wrote as Meagan McKinney
- Ruth Goodman (historian) (born 1963), British social historian
- Samuel Goodman (disambiguation), multiple people
- Saul Goodman (disambiguation), multiple people
- Scott Goodman (born 1973), Australian swimmer
- S.G. Goodman, American singer-songwriter
- Shirley Goodman (1936–2005), American R&B singer
- Steve Goodman (1948–1984), American folk artist
- Steven M. Goodman (born 1957), American conservation biologist
- Steven N. Goodman (born 1954), American epidemiologist
- Tamir Goodman (born 1982), American basketball player
- Vestal Goodman (1929–2003), American gospel singer, wife of Howard
- Walter Goodman (disambiguation), multiple people
- William Goodman (disambiguation), multiple people

- Billy Goodman (1926–1984), baseball infielder
- William Ernest Goodman (1879–1949), American cricketer
- William Meigh Goodman (1847–1928), British Colonial Judge
- Sir William George Toop Goodman known as W. G. T. Goodman (1872–1961), tramways engineer in South Australia

== Fictional characters ==
- Cyrus Goodman, Disney Channel’s first gay main character from Andi Mack
- Judge Goodman, character from the Judge Dredd comics
- Woody Goodman, character in the TV series Veronica Mars
- Goodman Brown, protagonist in the short story Young Goodman Brown.
- Goodman (NGBC), a fictional boss in Neo Geo Battle Coliseum
- Saul Goodman, character from the television series Breaking Bad and Better Call Saul
- Detective Goodman, character from the 2020 film The Grudge
- Goodman Family, main characters in Channel 4 comedy Friday Night Dinner
- Burt Goodman, character from the 2022 television series Severance

== See also ==
- Gutman, a surname
- Guttman, a surname
- Guttmann, a surname
