= Jacob Schaefer =

Jacob Schaefer may refer to:

- Jacob Schaefer Sr. (1855–1910), "the Wizard", professional straight rail and balkline billiards player
- Jacob Schaefer Jr. (1894–1975), professional balkline billiards player
- Jacob Schaefer (composer) (1888–1936), American Jewish composer and conductor
