= William Goodman =

William Goodman may refer to:

- Billy Goodman (1926–1984), baseball infielder
- William Ernest Goodman (1879–1949), American cricketer
- William Meigh Goodman, British colonial judge
- William E. Goodman (1838–1912), American soldier in the American Civil War
- William O. Goodman (1848–1936), American lumber tycoon
- Sir W. G. T. Goodman (William George Toop Goodman, 1872–1961), tramways engineer in South Australia

== See also ==
- Goodman (disambiguation)
- Goodman (surname)
