= Samuel Goodman =

Samuel Goodman may refer to:

- Samuel Goodman (cricketer) (1877–1905), American cricketer
- Samuel Goodman (rugby union) (fl. 1920–1924), American rugby union player and manager
- Sam Goodman (1931–1991), American Southern gospel singer and songwriter

== See also ==
- Goodman (surname)
- Samuel (name)
