= Jewish Culture Society Chorus =

- Choir
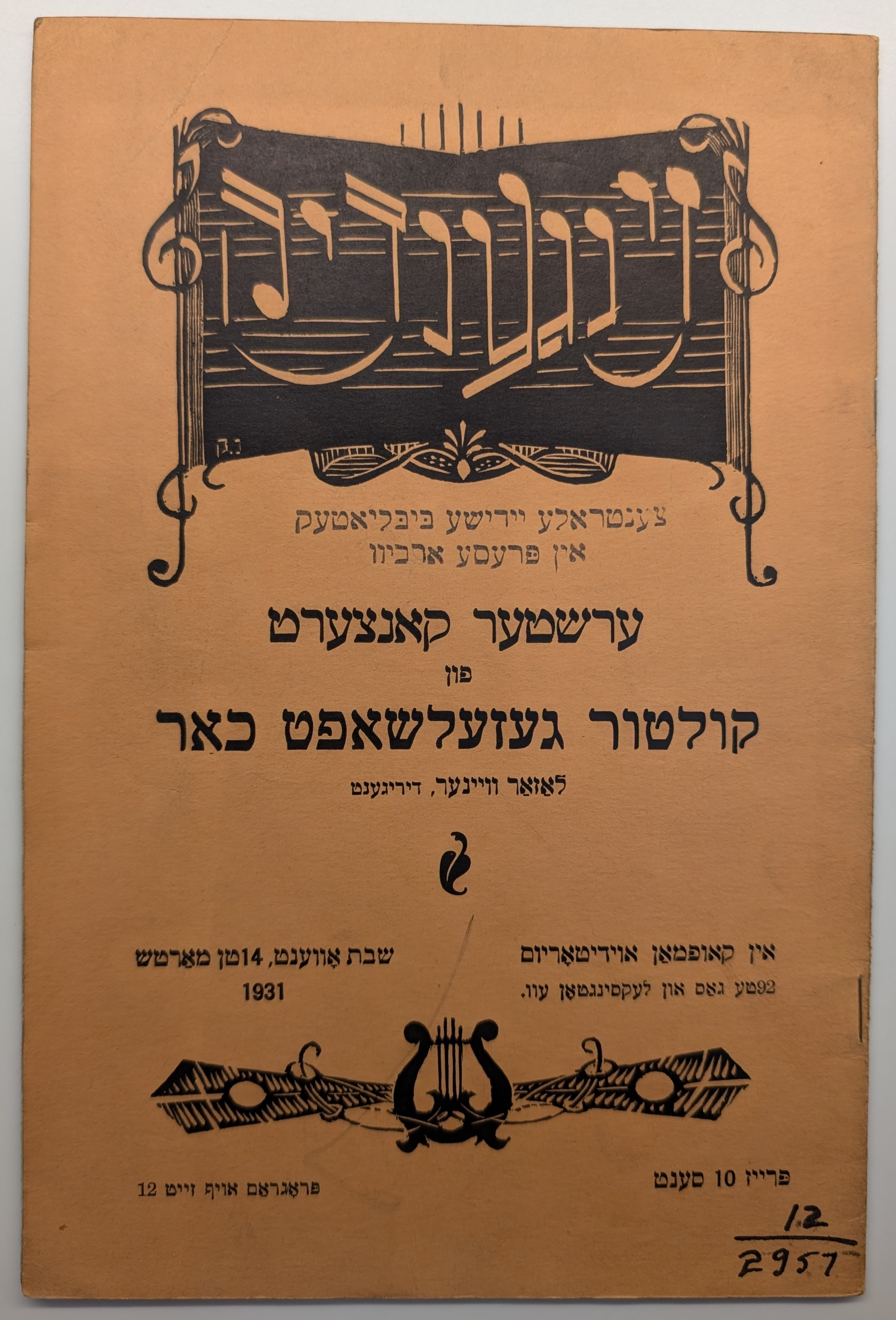
- booklet cover of the Jewish Culture Society Chorus' first concert in 1931
- Founded: 20 December 1929
- Founder: Lazar Weiner
- Disbanded: 1960s
- Genre: Art music, Secular Jewish music
- Director: Lazar Weiner, Vladimir Heifetz
- Affiliation: Jewish Culture Society (New York City)
- Associated groups: Freiheit Gezang Farein

The Jewish Culture Society Chorus (Yiddish: קולטור געזעלשאַפט כאָר, Kultur gezelshaft khor), sometimes translated as Culture Society Choir, was a Yiddish-language choir in New York City founded in 1929 as a project of the Jewish Culture Society. A number of notables from the New York City Yiddish art music world were involved in the choir and it performed at such venues as Carnegie Hall, The Town Hall, and the Brooklyn Academy of Music.

== History ==
The Jewish Culture Society Chorus was founded in December 1929 by a group of singers who left the Communist-affiliated Freiheit Gezang Farein over sectarian political disputes. Their intention was to create a new, non-partisan Yiddish art choir and they approached the Jewish Culture Society to act as parent organization. Lazar Weiner agreed to be its director and he selected a group of 40 singers to form the new chorus. It gradually gained new members in 1930 and its first public event was on February 2, with an evening dedicated to the 100th anniversary of Anton Rubinstein's birth. By 1931 had opened two more branches in the Bronx, including one in the Sholem Aleichem Co-op Housing complex; combined, the assembled choirs had roughly 125 members. They held their first official concert on March 14, 1931, at Kaufmann Concert Hall in what is now the 92nd Street Y.

In late 1934 the prolific composer and choral director Vladimir Heifetz, a cousin of violinist Jascha Heifetz, took over direction of the Chorus. He introduced a number of his arrangements and compositions to the repertoire, usually new settings of Yiddish poems or Yiddish adaptations of classical music pieces. In 1937 the choir presented his adaptation of Rubinstein's Kamennoi-Ostrow at The Town Hall.

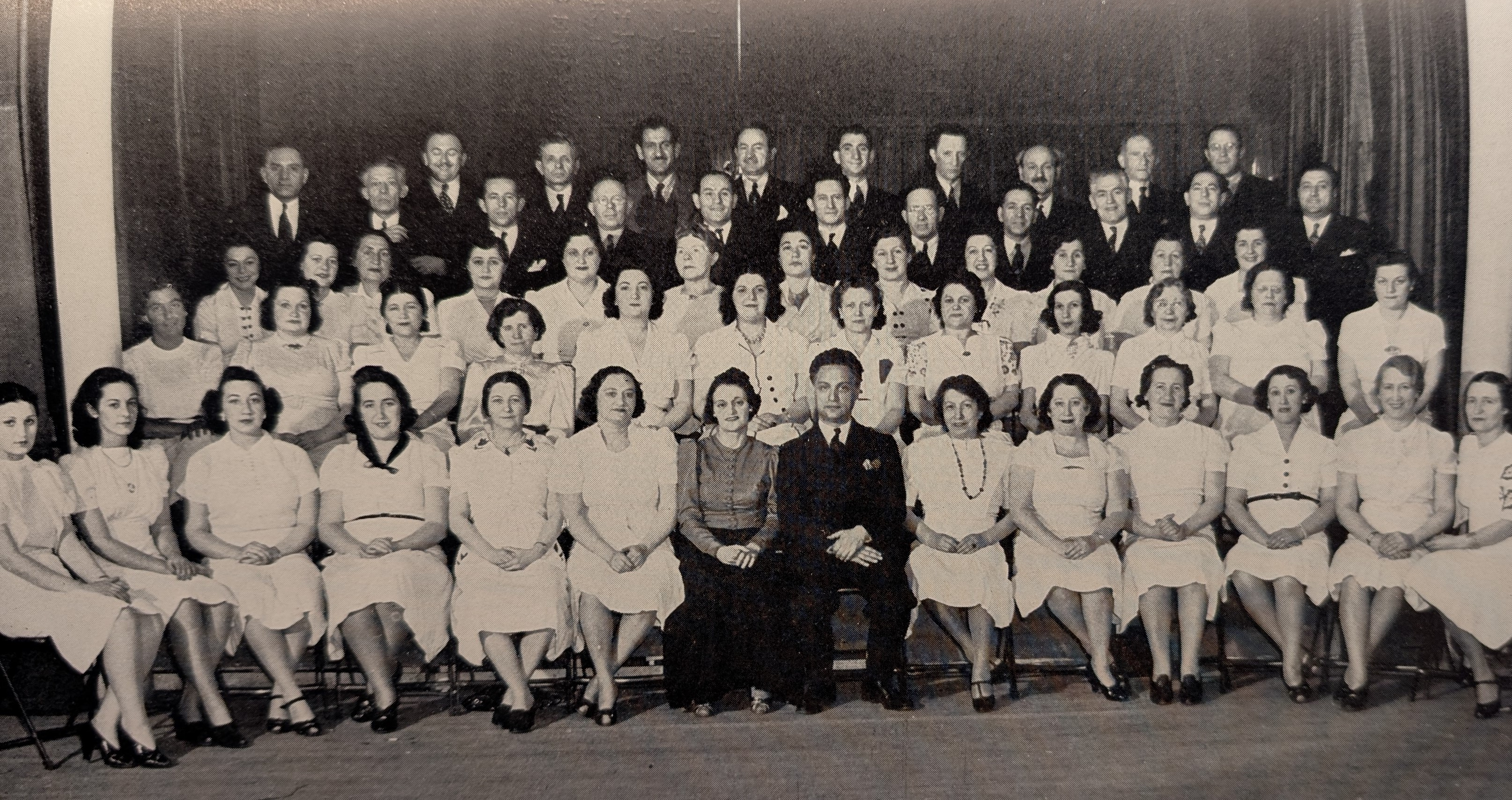
Jewish Culture Society Chorus members, 1940

For the Chorus' tenth anniversary, Heifetz composed a new setting of H. Leivick's Golem. However, the piece was not ready in time for the anniversary concert and selections from it were included at their Town Hall performance on May 4, 1940, with a mix of other choral arrangements and a cello performance by Samuel Spielman. The Golem setting was performed in full at Carnegie Hall on May 22, 1941, with bass Alexander Kipnis, soprano Mania Plat and baritone Sol Tisman.

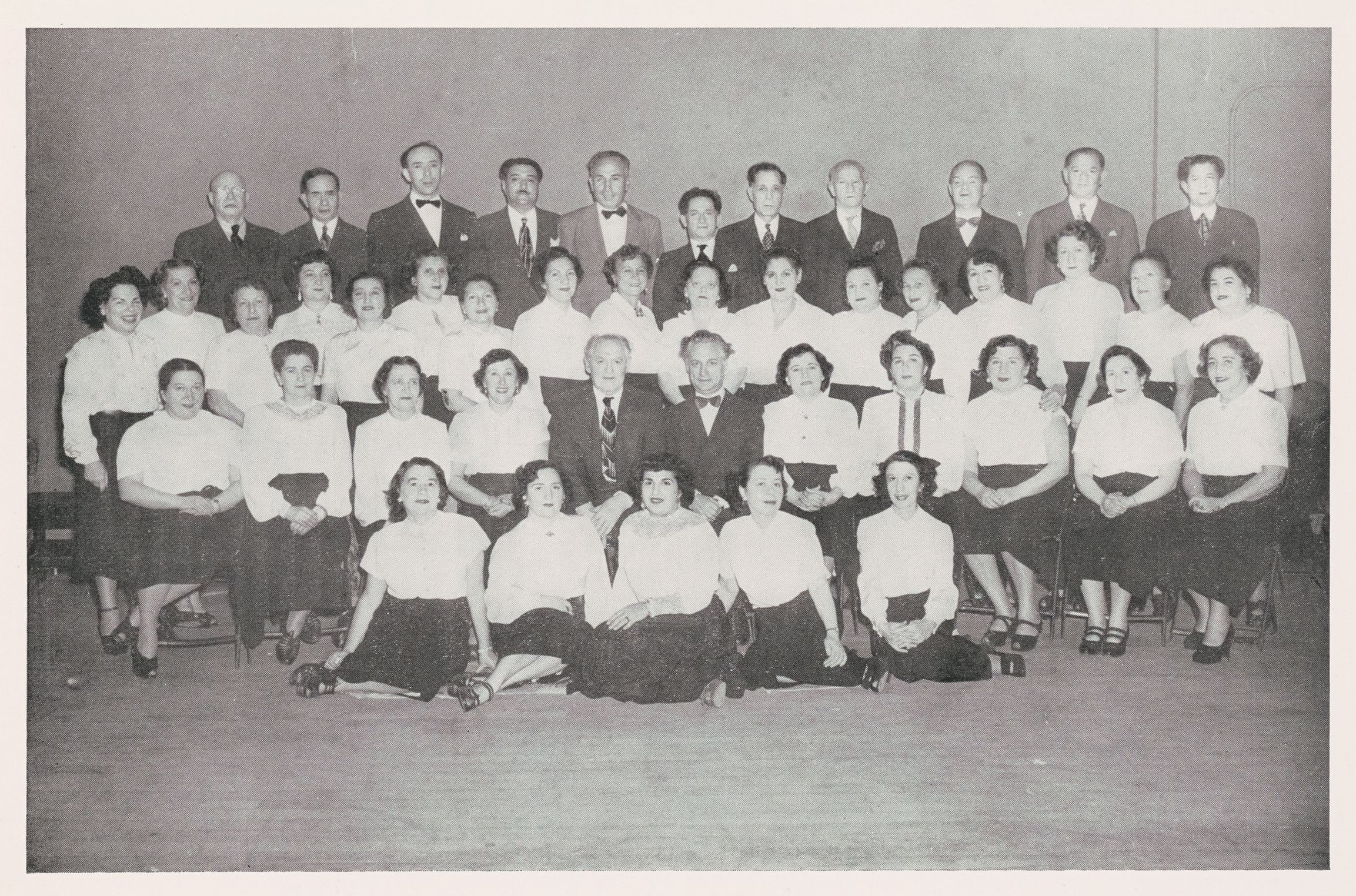
Members of the Jewish Culture Society Chorus, 1950.

For the twentieth anniversary concert on 15 April 1950 at The Town Hall they performed a mix of Heifetz, Weiner, and Jacob Schaefer choral arrangements and an instrumental suite on Klezmer themes by clarinetist Simeon Bellison and his chamber orchestra. The choir continued in the 1960s, despite an overall decline in interest in Yiddish music, and continued to get acclaim for the quality of its singers and Heifetz's compositions. They gave annual concerts, usually at The Town Hall, until at least 1962. It is unclear exactly when the Chorus ceased to exist; Heifetz died in 1970.
