= Goodmanson =

Goodmanson is a surname. Notable people with the surname include:

- John Goodmanson (born 1968), American record producer
- Richard Goodmanson, American businessman
