= Yiddish Philharmonic Chorus =

New York City secular Jewish choir

- דער ייִדישער פֿילהאַרמאָנישער כאָר
- Predecessor: Freiheit Gezang Farein, Jewish People's Philharmonic Chorus, Jewish People’s Chorus of New York
- Founder: Lazar Weiner, Jacob Schaefer
- Founded at: Lower East Side, Manhattan, New York City
- Purpose: artistic, cultural
- Location: New York City, United States
- Members: 35–40
- Conductor: Binyumen Schaechter
- Website: www.yiddishchorus.org

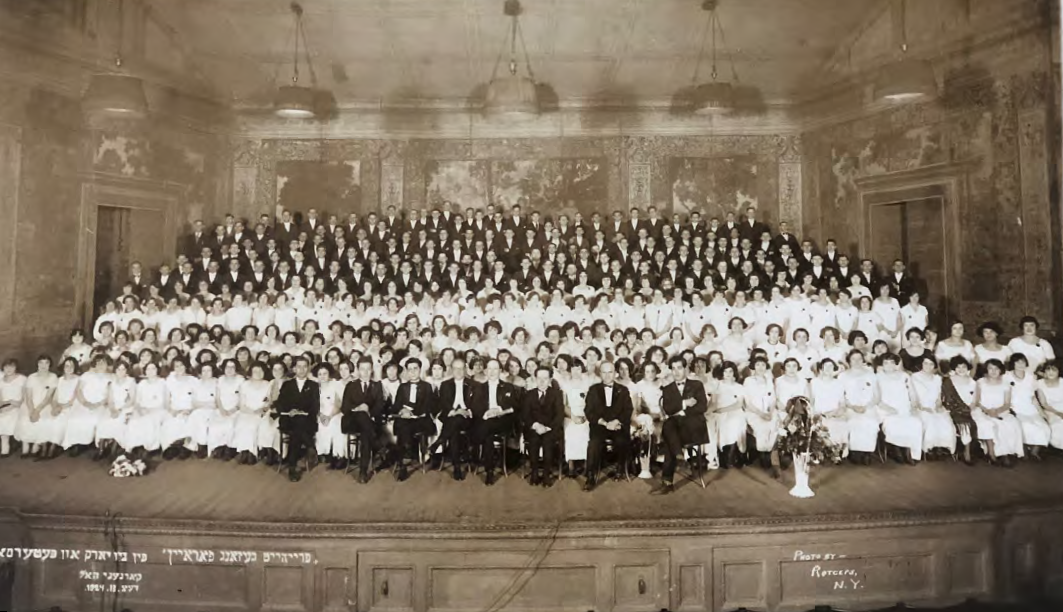
Freiheit Gezang Farein chorus, joint photo of New York City and Paterson N.J. branches, 1924

The Yiddish Philharmonic Chorus (Yiddish: דער ייִדישער פֿילהאַרמאָנישער כאָר der yidisher filharmonisher khor) is a 35– to 40–voice New York City-based chorus which performs exclusively in the Yiddish language. Binyumen Schaechter has been its musical director since 1995. The chorus is distinctive for its focus on musicianship, accurate Yiddish pronunciation, expressiveness, and largely original repertoire.

The Yiddish Philharmonic Chorus traces its origins to 1923, when Lazar Weiner and Jacob Schaefer founded the Freiheit Gezang Farein in New York. Moissaye Joseph Olgin, editor of the Communist-affiliated Yiddish newspaper Morgen Freiheit, was instrumental in the creation of the chorus. In 1948, the group renamed itself Jewish People's Philharmonic Chorus (Yidisher filharmonisher folkskhor) to distance itself from both its Communist roots and its ideology-driven repertoire. In 2021, the chorus adopted its current name to reflect its current focus on Yiddish music of many genres and its mission to promote specifically Yiddish culture.

== Performances and membership ==
The chorus performs several times a year, with two thematic concerts in a larger venue and one or more briefer performances in smaller private venues. They sing choral arrangements scored for four voices (soprano, alto, tenor, and bass), usually with piano accompaniment but occasionally a cappella. The song selections may include choral settings of Yiddish folk, labor, Holocaust-themed, and art songs, Jewish holiday classics, and Yiddish translations of songs written in other languages. The works are secular, although a few are based on liturgical texts. Concerts include both new and previously performed arrangements that relate to the season's theme.

Choir members range in age from their twenties to their eighties. Most are not fluent in Yiddish but have an affinity for the language and a desire to increase their knowledge by singing in Yiddish. Auditions take place each year in August and September.

The chorus generally produces two annual themed concerts performed in Merkin Hall at Kaufman Music Center in New York City. In keeping with their educational and cultural mission, they provide live concert audiences with English supertitles and program journals including all song lyrics and lyric translations.

== History ==
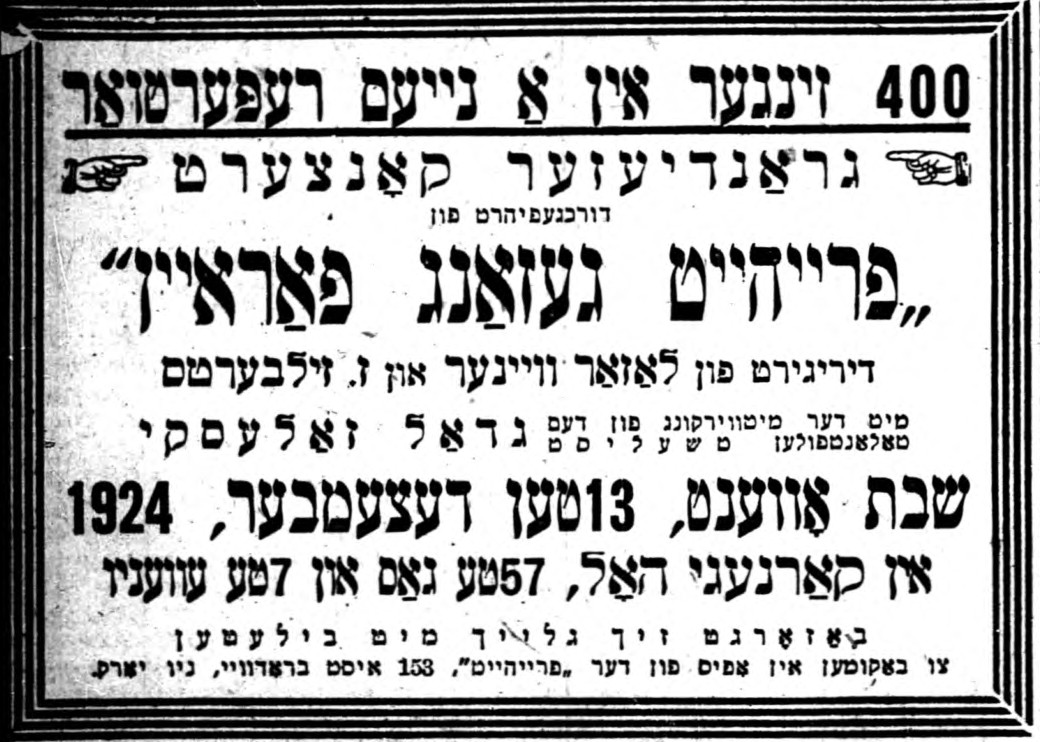
Advertisement for Freiheit Gezang Farein concert from 1924 in Der Tog

The New York branch of the Freiheit Gezang Farein (Yiddish: פרײהײט געזאַנג פאַרײן Freedom chorus) was founded in 1923 by composers Lazar Weiner and Jacob Schaefer on the Lower East Side of Manhattan. Schaefer, who was still living in Chicago at the time, had used the name for a choir he had founded there in 1913–14. He selected the name to avoid alienating potential members or audiences who were not Communists. The New York choir was strongly affiliated with the Communist newspaper Morgen Freiheit, which had been founded in 1922, and its editor Moissaye Joseph Olgin. The chorus, in turn, had a strong working class identity and espoused far left or Communist politics; many of its early members were garment workers. The choir became quite large, growing from 100 to 200 members in its first decade, most of whom were first-generation Jewish immigrants who spoke Yiddish as their first language. Though the repertoire was mainly in Yiddish, the group also performed in Russian, Polish, and other European languages. In the early years, Weiner and Schaefer composed works for the chorus, and both served as conductors. The group's first major concert at Carnegie Hall in February 1924. Subsequently, the chorus often performed together in concert with the Freiheit Mandolin Orkester, a Mandolin orchestra also founded and directed by Schaefer. The choir regularly appeared at rallies and political events as well.

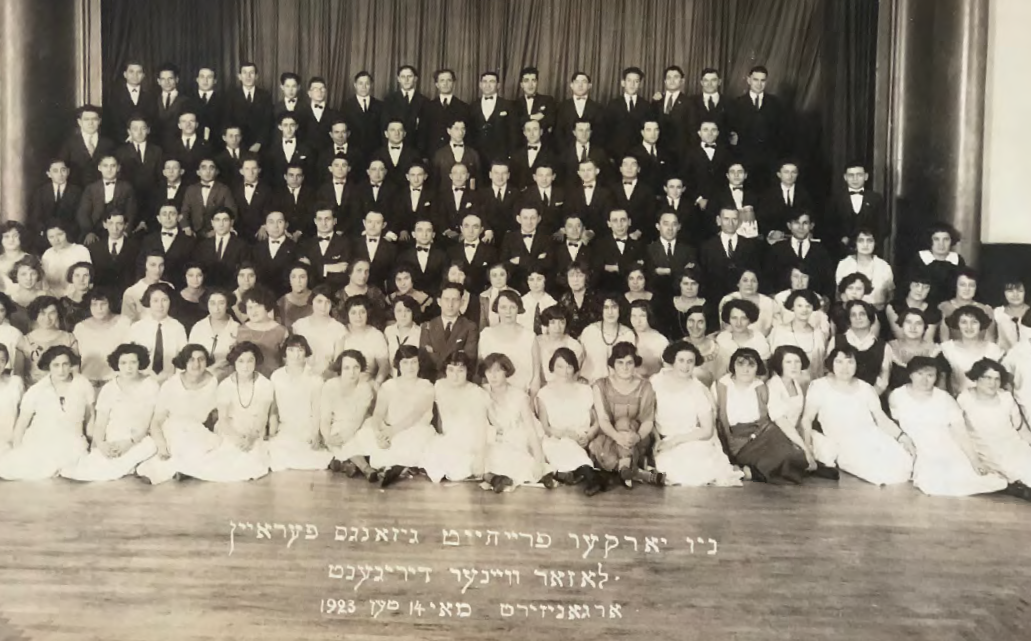
Group photo of the Freiheit Gezang Farein chorus, New York City, 1923

In 1925 the Jewish Workers Music Alliance (Yiddish: דער ייִדיש-מוזיקאַלישער אַרבעטער-פאַרבאַנד) was founded to fund Yiddish-language choirs and to publish arrangements created by Freiheit Gezang Farein (FGF) conductors. During this time, the FGF was closely affiliated with the International Workers Order. Other affiliated choirs, all singing under the name Freiheit Gezang Farein, were founded in more than 30 cities around North America, including Philadelphia and Montreal. The New York group also grew so large that it founded various neighborhood and suburban branches, each holding its own rehearsals. During that period, there were other Yiddish choruses in the city which were politically progressive but not Communist-affiliated.

One of the choir's early successes was its February 1926 performance of Schaefer's Tsvey brider (Two brothers), based on a work by I. L. Peretz, to an audience of 4000 at the Mecca Temple. Schaefer then created another successful oratorio, Di tsvelf (The twelve), performed at Carnegie Hall in April 1927. The main choir often performed jointly with affiliates. Its fifth jubilee concert at Carnegie Hall in April 1928 was staged together with the Paterson, New Jersey branch which Schaefer also directed.

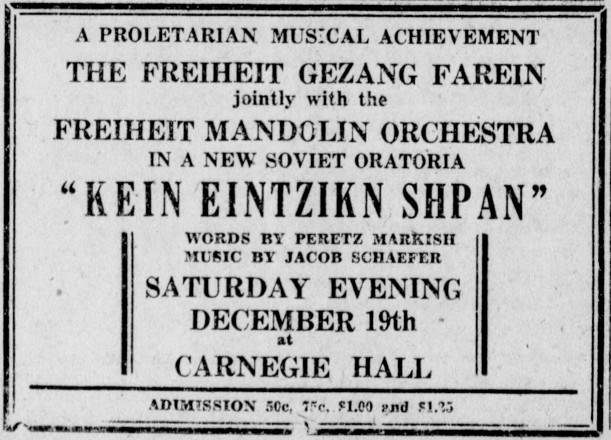
Advertisement for Freiheit chorus and mandolin orchestra performance from the Daily Worker, 1931

In the 1930s, the choir under Schaefer continued to have a strong Communist and pro-Soviet orientation. This occasionally caused disagreements, as in 1929 when a group of members left to form a new nonpartisan choir, the Jewish Culture Society Chorus. In 1930 the Freiheit chorus, accompanied by fifty members of the Manhattan Symphony Orchestra, performed Schaefer's revolutionary oratorio October at Carnegie Hall. It incorporated poems selected by Nathaniel Buchwald from the works of Soviet poets Itzik Feffer, Leib Kvitko, and Peretz Markish, as well as pre-Soviet poets such as Morris Rosenfeld. In 1932 Feffer invited Schaefer to Kharkiv, where he premiered October. In 1933 he went to Moscow to represent the choir at the International Congress of Proletarian Musicians. There was even the suggestion of a Soviet tour by his New York chorus, although that did not materialize. Upon Schaefer's return to New York in May 1933, the choir gave another concert at Carnegie Hall. They once again presented October at their 1935 annual concert, while they reprised Tsvey brider the following year.

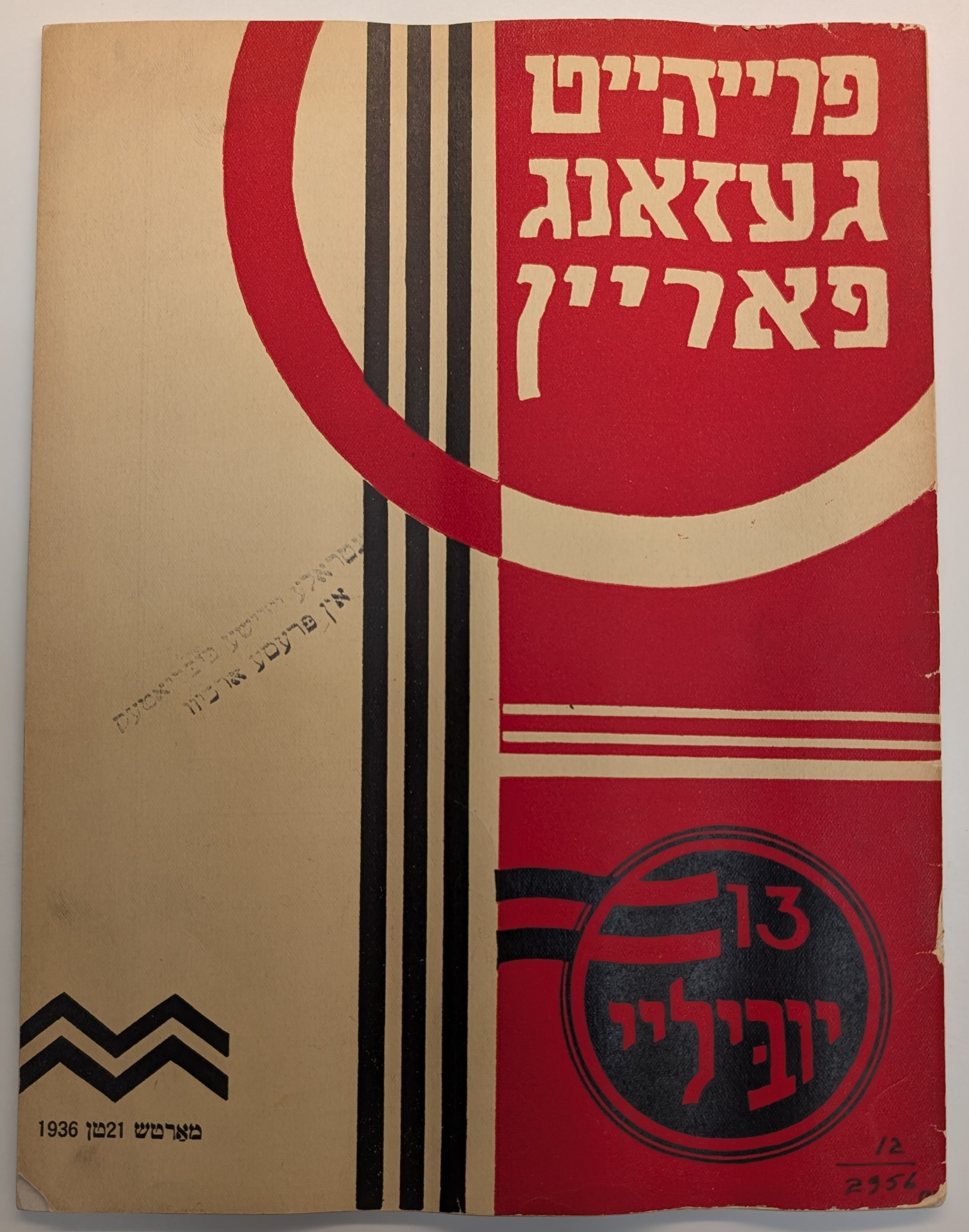
Cover of the Freiheit Gezang Farein's 13th anniversary booklet, 1936.

Education and outreach were important elements of the chorus's work, so Schaefer sought to keep the music at a sophisticated artistic level without making it sound inaccessible to working-class listeners. For most of the 1930s, the conductors of the choir (Schaefer and later Helfman) published annual booklets containing choral arrangements. The network of affiliates around the United States continued to do well. A 1936 article estimated that the FGF network had forty choirs around the country with roughly 4000 members, of which 500 singers were located in New York.

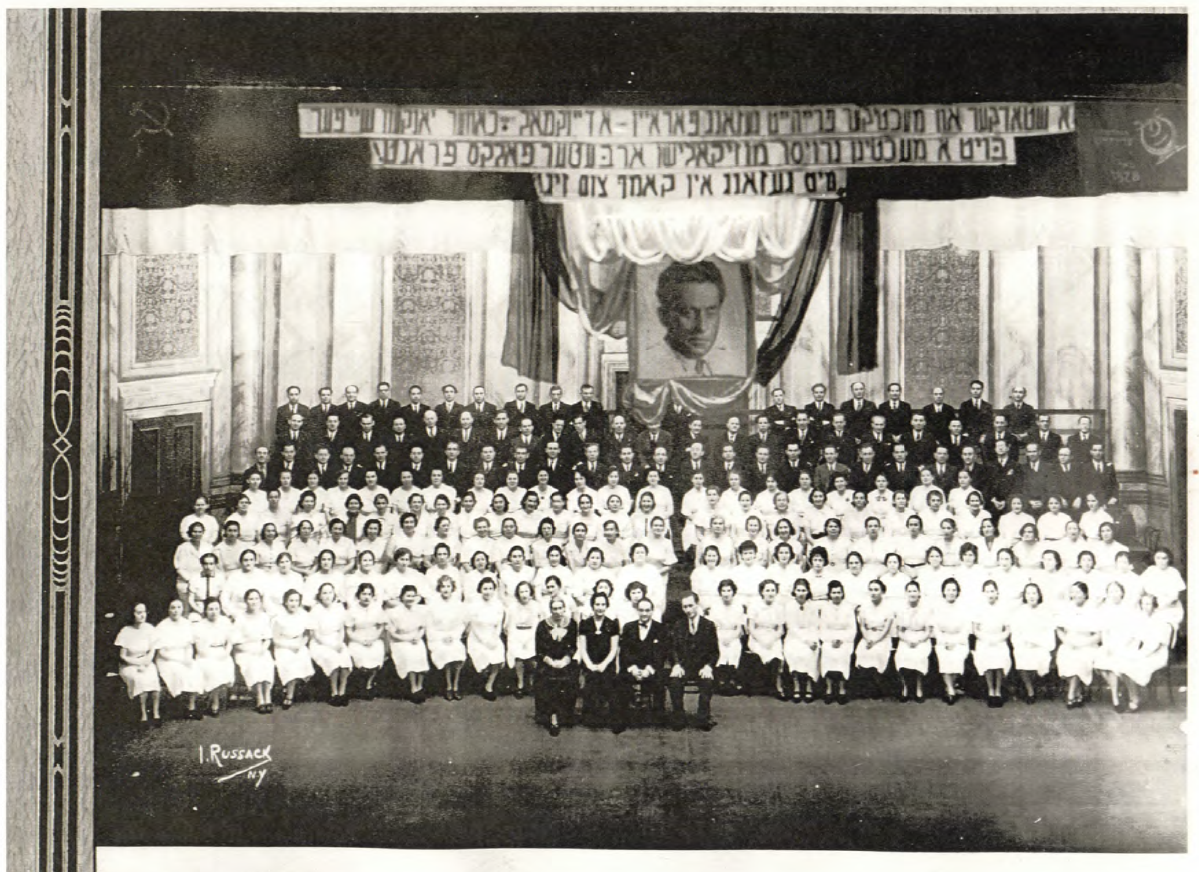
Freiheit Gezang Farein chorus in New York, circa 1936-7

Schaefer died unexpectedly in 1936 at age 48. The chorus hired prolific composer, accompanist and choir director Max Helfman to replace him in late 1936 or early 1937. In 1938, Helfman became head of the Jewish Workers Musical Alliance, which eventually dropped the word Workers from its name. Helfman began to edit subsequent editions of the Alliance's published booklets. In 1937 Helfman had the FGF present Schaefer's final unperformed oratorio A bunt mit a statshke (Strike and revolt). This work portrayed scenes in the lives of workers via folksongs collected by Soviet musicologist Moisei Beregovsky. The oratorio was so well received that they performed it again the following year at their annual May concert. In December 1937 the choir also performed in a joint memorial event for Schaefer, George Gershwin, and Henry Kimball Hadley, funded by the Works Progress Administration.

With the start of the Cold War, the FGF, mandolin orchestra and its parent organizations were targeted by the US government as subversive organizations. The Jewish Music Alliance was also attacked in the press for its Communist ties. Because of this, in 1948 the choir changed its name to the Jewish People's Philharmonic Chorus (ייִדישער פֿילהאַרמאָנישער פֿאָלקסכאָר Yidisher filharmonisher folkskhor). The International Workers Order was forced to close, and the Jewish Fraternal People's Order, which had supported the choir, lost its financial base. Many members left the group for fear of being targeted themselves.

In 1948, the chorus, now the Jewish People's Philharmonic Chorus (JPPC), performed at Carnegie Hall in its final concert under Helfman. They debuted his Di naye hagode (The new Haggadah), a Cantata based on an epic poem by Itzik Feffer about the Warsaw Ghetto Uprising. When Helfman left the JPPC in 1948, Leo Kopf, a refugee from Germany, took over as conductor. At around this time, owing to the founding of the State of Israel and shifts in American Jewish musical tastes, the choir also began to introduce Hebrew-language material. It was under Kopf's direction that the choir made its first recording in around 1949–50, a multi-disc set that included a mix of Hebrew and Yiddish materials, and a mix of compositions and arrangements by Helfman, Kopf and Schaefer. In 1952 Kopf also staged the first American performance of Dmitri Shostakovich's 1949 Song of the Forests, translated into Yiddish by Nathaniel Buchwald.

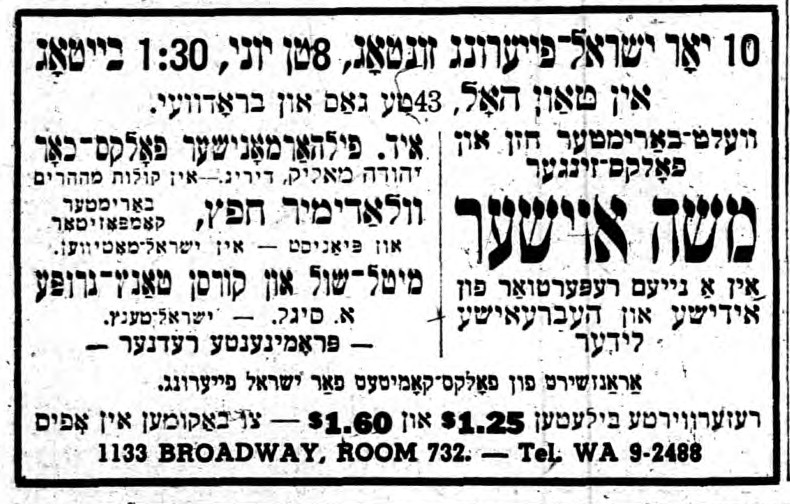
Yiddish-language advertisement for 10 years of Israel celebration concert, Der Tog, 1958

When Kopf died in March 1953, Eugene Malek became conductor (possibly in 1952 as Kopf's health declined). Malek remained until 1960, when the JPPC merged with the Jewish People's Chorus of New York, an affiliated choir conducted by Maurice Rauch. Rauch became conductor of the new chorus which continued to perform under the JPPC name. After Rauch left in 1971, a series of conductors followed, some with a brief tenure: Oscar Julius (1971–72), Rauch again (1972–78), Franco Rossi (1978–80), Rauch (1980), Madeline Simon (1980–84), and Peter Schlosser (1984–95). During this period, the number of members dwindled greatly (there were only eighteen members in 1981), and the number of public performances was reduced.

In 1995, Binyumen Schaechter became conductor, a role which he continues to hold at present. He developed the choir, which had lost the ability to perform more advanced arrangements, into a more ambitious ensemble which could perform at a more professional level. This included holding auditions for new members starting in 2002. The chorus began to perform more often, including at The Town Hall and at the Museum of Jewish Heritage in 1998, at the World Trade Center Plaza in 2000, and Queens College. In 2005, for the New York Mets’ Jewish Heritage Day, they performed at Shea Stadium. In 2006 the choir released a CD, Zingt! A Celebration of Yiddish Choral Music, its first album in several decades. The choir appeared at the North American Jewish Choral Festival in Ellenville, New York, in 2000, 2001 and 2003 and at the New York International Choir Festival at Lincoln Center in 2002, 2005 and 2006. In 2007 the choir appeared in Tickling Leo. It then returned to the North American Jewish Choral Festival for several more years, appearing in 2007, 2010–1, and annually since 2013. In 2013, they performed at the Cathedral of St. John the Divine, the fourth-largest church in the world, commemorating 70 years since the Warsaw Ghetto Uprising. In 2014, they began to post annotated YouTube video excerpts of live concerts.

In 2021, the choir assumed its present name, the Yiddish Philharmonic Chorus (Yiddish: ייִדישער פֿילהאַרמאָנישער כאָר Yidisher filharmonisher khor).

== Publications and recordings ==
=== Musical scores ===
- Mit gezang tsum kamf - Songs for Voice and Piano (International Workers Order, 1932, compiled by Jacob Schaefer)
- Gezang un kamf 2 (Yidisher muzikalisher-arbeter farband, 1934, by Jacob Schaefer)
- Gezang un kamf 3 (YMAF, 1935, by Jacob Schaefer)
- Gezang un kamf 4 (YMAF, 1936, by Jacob Schaefer)
- Gezang un kamf 5 (Yidisher muzik-farband, 1937, by Jacob Schaefer and Max Helfman)
- Gezang un kamf 6 (YMF, 1938, by Max Helfman)
- Gezang un kamf 7 (YMF, 1939, by Max Helfman)
- Gezang un kamf 8 (YMF, 1940, by Max Helfman)
- "Ich Her a Kol": 22 Selected songs of Jacob Schaefer (YMF, 1952)
- Lomir ale zingen/Let's Sing: A collection of Yiddish, English and Hebrew Songs (YMF, 1956)

=== Sound recordings ===
- The Jewish People's Philharmonic Chorus, new york, Dr. Leo Kopf, conductor (c. 1949–51, RCA Records, 4-disc album)
- Sholem Aleichem Dir, Amerike! (c. 1958–60, Tikva Records, the Jewish People's Chorus of New York conducted by Maurice Rauch)
- Rozhinkes mit Mandlen, from the treasures of Avrom Goldfaden songs (c. 1958–60, Tikva Records, the Jewish People's Chorus of New York conducted by Maurice Rauch)
- Tsvei Brider (1967, Tikva Records/YMF, composed by Jacob Schaefer, text by I. L. Peretz, conducted by Maurice Rauch)
- Zingt! A Celebration of Yiddish Choral Music (2006)
