= George Goodman (disambiguation) =

George Goodman (1930–2014) was an American economics commentator known also as "Adam Smith".

George Goodman may also refer to:

- George Goodman (politician) (c. 1792–1859), English politician, Member of Parliament for Leeds
- George Goodman (RAF officer) (1920–1941), Battle of Britain pilot
- George Goodman (Royal Navy officer) (1900–1945), Royal Navy Volunteer Reserve, awarded the George Cross
- George Goodman (table tennis), English table tennis player
- George Goodman, a pseudonym for footballer George Getgood
- George Nicholas Goodman (1895–1959), mayor of Mesa, Arizona
- George Barron Goodman, Australian photographer
