= Melody Goodman =

American biostatistician

- Education: Stony Brook University; Harvard University
- Known for: Dean of the NYU School of Global Public Health
- Scientific career
- Fields: Biostatistics
- Workplaces: Stony Brook University; Washington University in St. Louis; New York University
- Thesis: Statistical Methods for Community-Based Cancer Interventions and Health Disparities Research (2006)
- Doctoral advisor: Yi Li

Melody S. Goodman is an American biostatistician and higher education executive whose work focuses on social determinants of health, health literacy, and stakeholder engagement in health research. Goodman has spoken publicly about racial disparities in access to healthcare, and is an advocate for public outreach and engagement on health issues. She is a professor of biostatistics and Dean of the New York University School of Global Public Health as of 2025.

== Education and career ==
Goodman majored in economics and applied mathematics & statistics as an undergraduate at Stony Brook University, graduating in 1999. She went to Harvard University for graduate study in biostatistics, earning a master's degree in 2003 and completing her Ph.D. in 2006. Her dissertation, Statistical Methods for Community-Based Cancer Interventions and Health Disparities Research, was supervised by Yi Li. She is African-American, but had no African-American professors throughout her education, and her later publications have included work on the diversity of students and faculty in public health.

Goodman taught biostatistics at Stony Brook University, where she was an assistant professor of preventive medicine, Washington University School of Medicine, where she was an assistant professor in the Division of Public Health Sciences, and New York University. Goodman has been a member of the NYU Global Public Health faculty since 2017.

On March 29, 2024, Goodman was named Interim Dean of the NYU School of Global Public Health after Debra Furr-Holden stepped down from the deanship.

== Books ==
Goodman is the author of the book Biostatistics for Clinical and Public Health Research (Routledge, 2018). With Vetta Sanders Thompson, she is co-editor of Public Health Research Methods for Partnerships and Practice (Routledge, 2018).

== Recognition ==
Goodman was named a Fellow of the American Statistical Association in 2021.
