= Anthony Goodman =

Anthony Goodman may refer to:

- Anthony Goodman (historian) (1936–2016), English medieval historian
- Anthony A. Goodman (born 1940), surgeon, academic and author

== See also ==
- Tony Goodman, American video game executive and entrepreneur
