= Henry E. Blackman =

American politician

Henry E. Blackman was an American farmer and politician in the State of Michigan.

Blackman served in the offices of the Allegan County, Michigan Superintendent of the Poor, the Allegan County Drain Commissioner, the Trowbridge Township, Michigan Supervisor, and Justice of the Peace as a member of the National Party. Blackman's highest office was that of State Representative in the Michigan Legislature, to which position he elected in 1879. After serving only one term in the legislature, he was defeated for reelection in 1881 by Republican Francis Adam Goodman.

Blackman was born in Aurora, Ohio (Portage County) 6 January 1820. In 1839, he relocated to Michigan, finally settling in Trowbridge Township in 1841. Outside of the political arena, Blackman made his living as a farmer.
