= Paul Goodman (disambiguation) =

Paul Goodman (1911–1972) was an American author, public intellectual, and social critic.

Paul Goodman may also refer to:

- Paul Goodman (historian) (1934–1995), American historian
- Paul Goodman (ice hockey) (1905–1959), American ice hockey player
- Paul Goodman (sound engineer)
- Paul Goodman (Zionist) (1875–1949), British Zionist
- Paul Goodman, Baron Goodman of Wycombe (born 1959), British journalist and Conservative politician
- Paul S. Goodman (1937–2012), American organizational psychologist and filmmaker
