= Salem Township, Allegan County, Michigan =

Salem Township, Michigan
- Township
- Location within the state of Michigan
- Coordinates: 42°43′3″N 85°49′49″W
- Country: United States
- State: Michigan
- County: Allegan

Area
  - Total: 36.0 sq mi (93.3 km^{2})
  - Land: 35.7 sq mi (92.5 km^{2})
  - Water: 0.35 sq mi (0.9 km^{2})
- Elevation: 666 ft (203 m)

Population (2020)
  - Total: 5,156
  - Density: 144.4/sq mi (55.76/km^{2})
- Time zone: UTC-5 (Eastern (EST))
  - Summer (DST): UTC-4 (EDT)
- FIPS code: 26-71100
- GNIS feature ID: 1627034
- Website: www.salemtownship.org

Salem Township is a civil township of Allegan County in the U.S. state of Michigan. The population was 5,156 at the 2020 census, up from 3,486 at the 2000 census.

== Communities ==
Burnips is an unincorporated community near the center of the township at 42°43′55″N 85°50′22″W. It was first known as Salem Center. James Burnips was a local landowner and built the first store there in 1856. He began to sell lots of land for building in 1858. A post office named "Burnip's Corners" opened in 1868, and the name was changed to "Burnips" in 1915. The ZIP code is 49314.

Diamond Springs is an unincorporated locale in the southwest corner of the township on the Rabbit River at 42°40′50″N 85°53′49″W. It was first settled in 1867 and had a post office from 1871 until 1875, and then reopened six months later until closing in 1905.

New Salem is an unincorporated community in the northeast corner of the township at 42°45′14″N 85°48′07″W. A post office first opened there in 1857 and opened and closed several times until 1865, after which it remained in operation until closing in 1905. New Salem is the home of St. Mary's Visitation Catholic Church which celebrated its 150th anniversary in 2016.

== Geography ==
According to the United States Census Bureau, the township has a total area of 36.0 square miles (93.3 km^{2}), of which 35.7 square miles (92.5 km^{2}) is land and 0.35 square miles (0.9 km^{2}), or 0.92%, is water.

== Demographics ==
Historical population
Census	Pop.	Note	%±
1960	1,459		—
1970	1,744		19.5%
1980	2,183		25.2%
1990	2,708		24.0%
2000	3,474		28.3%
2010	4,446		28.0%
2020	5,156		16.0%
Source: Census Bureau. Census 1960- 2000, 2010.

As of the census of 2000, there were 3,486 people, 1,151 households, and 941 families residing in the township. The population density was 97.5 inhabitants per square mile (37.6/km^{2}). There were 1,181 housing units at an average density of 33.0 per square mile (12.7/km^{2}). The racial makeup of the township was 96.99% White, 0.14% African American, 1.03% Native American, 0.32% Asian, 0.57% from other races, and 0.95% from two or more races. Hispanic or Latino of any race were 1.84% of the population.

There were 1,151 households, out of which 46.0% had children under the age of 18 living with them, 72.5% were married couples living together, 6.3% had a female householder with no husband present, and 18.2% were non-families. 14.9% of all households were made up of individuals, and 5.5% had someone living alone who was 65 years of age or older. The average household size was 3.03 and the average family size was 3.37.

In the township the population was spread out, with 31.8% under the age of 18, 8.6% from 18 to 24, 34.8% from 25 to 44, 17.2% from 45 to 64, and 7.6% who were 65 years of age or older. The median age was 32 years. For every 100 females, there were 104.1 males. For every 100 females age 18 and over, there were 103.5 males.

The median income for a household in the township was $48,203, and the median income for a family was $54,625. Males had a median income of $37,768 versus $26,164 for females. The per capita income for the township was $19,620. About 2.6% of families and 3.3% of the population were below the poverty line, including 4.9% of those under age 18 and none of those age 65 or over.

== Notable people ==
- Francis Adam Goodman, veteran of the Civil War; lived in Salem Township and represented the town in the State Legislature (1881–1883)
