= Max Helfman =

Jewish Polish-American composer

Max Helfman in the 1950s

Max Helfman (Yiddish: מאַקס העלפמאַן, 1901–1963) was a Polish-born American Jewish composer, choral conductor, pianist, singer, and educator. He had a long career arranging both secular and religious Jewish music and was considered to have a gift for writing music that was both singable and emotionally complex, which was modern and original and yet rooted in traditional folk and synagogue melodies.

Among his best known works are his Shabbat Kodesh (1942), a Sabbath Cantata, and his Di naye hagode (1948), a Yiddish-language Cantata about the Warsaw Ghetto Uprising. He directed many choirs and educational institutes on both the east and west coasts, most famously the Brandeis-Bardin Institute in California for seventeen years; his influence is most strongly felt on the religious music of Reform Judaism. He was also well known for socialist and pro-Zionist causes and affiliations.

== Biography ==
=== Early life ===
He was born Motel Helfman on 25 May 1901 in Radzyń Podlaski, Congress Poland. His mother was named Eva Daniels and his father Nathan Helfman taught and led a choir as well as working as a mohel and hazzan. Max sang in his father's choir from a young age and was already noticed for his excellent singing voice. They lived in Warsaw for a time before emigrating. In August 1909, the family left Poland, sailing from Rotterdam to New York City and settling on the Lower East Side.

He continued to develop his youthful interest in music and singing, and almost immediately after the family arrived in 1909, he was already performing solos in school productions and as an alto in synagogues. Joseph Rumshinsky supposedly heard Helfman singing as a boy sololist and was impressed by his "silver bell"-like voice. He graduated from high school in 1918 with a music award that gave him a scholarship at the Mannes School of Music in New York. He completed a degree at the Mannes School, and his graduating composition won a prize. In April 1926 he married his wife Florence, a fellow pianist. They had two children, David and Naomi. He became a naturalized US citizen in 1939.

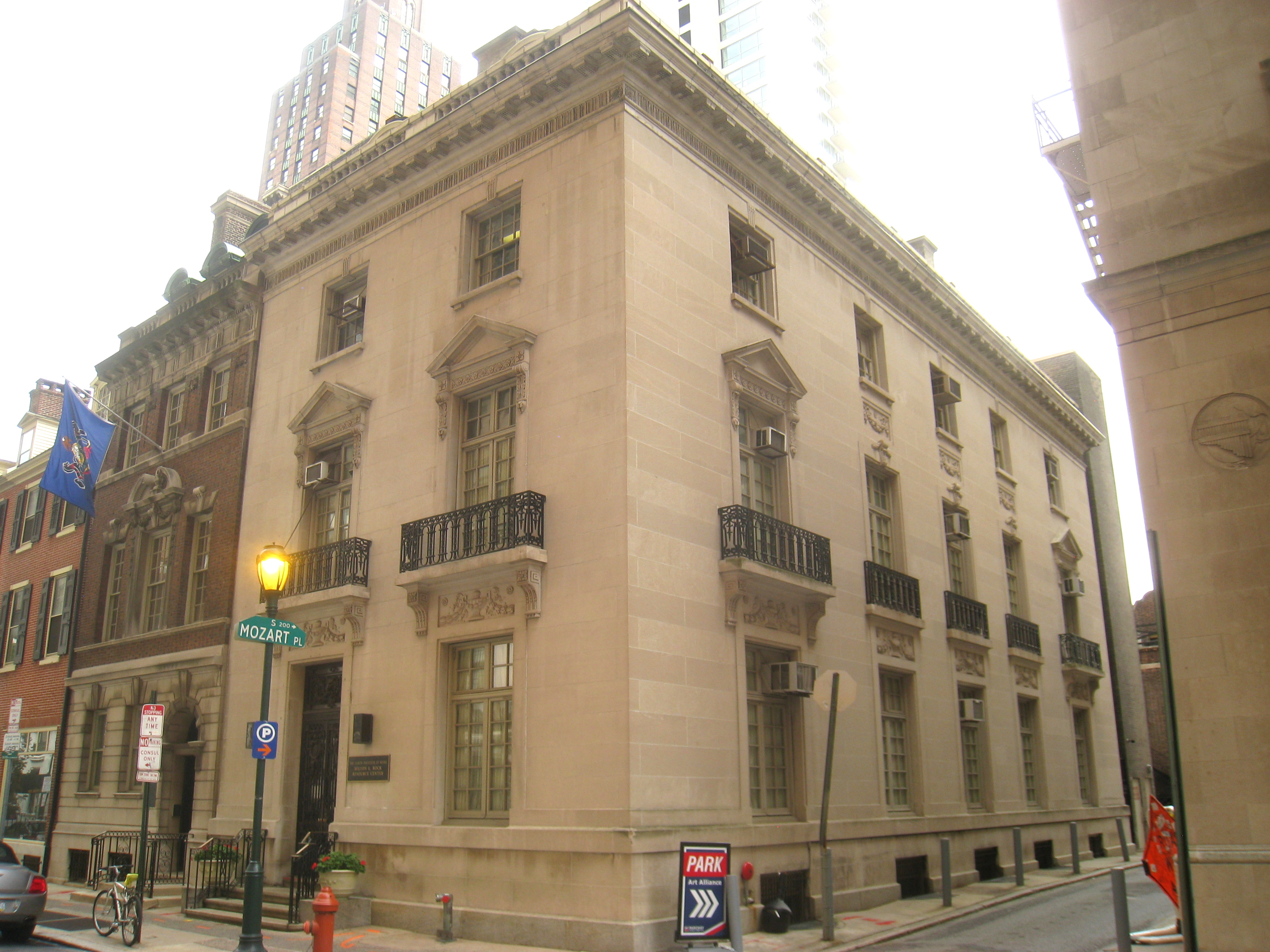
Curtis Institute of Music

=== Music career ===
In the mid-1920s, Helfman attempted to make a name for himself as a composer, and also worked as an organist and choir director at various places in New York and New Jersey. Although his training was in Classical music, Helfman mainly dedicated himself to both Secular and religious Jewish music. One of his early large works, Aron Ha-Kodesh, surprised audiences with its complexity. As well, he soon found that he had a gift for directing a choir, even a very large one. In 1928 his early success gained him a fellowship at the Curtis Institute of Music in Philadelphia, studying under such figures as Fritz Reiner (conducting), Ralph Leopold (piano), and Rosario Scalero (composition). He stayed at the Curtis Institute until 1931.

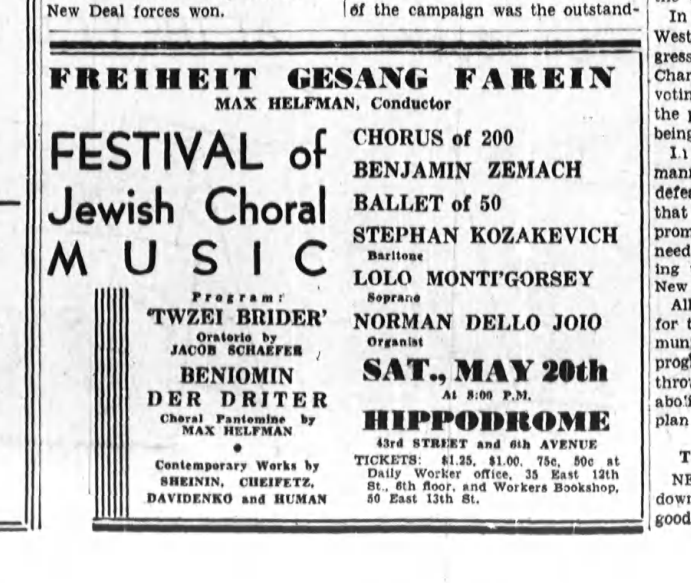
Freiheit Gezang Farein choir advertisement, 1939

As the 1930s went on Helfman took on more leadership roles and his prestige increased as a choir conductor and arranger. He became known for his innovative techniques in physically directing the choir, arranging music that had a Jewish feel in every voice part, and improvising interesting changes with each performance. The largest of these secular choirs was the 200-member, communist-affiliated Freiheit Gezang Farein (founded by Lazar Weiner), which he became director of in 1936–7 when Jacob Schaefer died. He also led other secular choirs during the 1930s; a 50-person Arbeter Ring choir based in Paterson and one in Passaic, New Jersey. When booked for a large event he would sometimes bring multiple choirs together to sing with four or five hundred voices. In 1938 he became director of the Handel Choir in Westfield, New Jersey. He also directed a 400 person choir in the Temple of Religion at the 1939 New York World's Fair. Composer William Schuman heard that World's Fair choir performance on the radio and was so impressed that he composed a new piece for Helfman's choir to perform at Madison Square Garden on the Fourth of July 1940.

Helfman hed leadership roles in a number of Synagogues over his life, and also held regular roles leading High Holy Days services at others. He became organist and choirmaster at Temple Israel of the City of New York in 1928 when Zavel Zilberts left. It was there that he developed a close relationship with cantor David Putterman; he arranged new pieces for him even after they both left Temple Israel. He also led the choir at Temple Emanu-El in Paterson starting in around 1929 and ending in 1941. He was also director at Temple B'Nai Abraham in Newark, New Jersey, a Conservative synagogue which placed a great emphasis on music, and developed its choir into a very technically advanced one. His collaboration with cantor Abraham Shapiro at B'Nai Abraham was also important to his musical development. He was also director of the Park Avenue Synagogue; during the period of 1943–53 he arranged a number of new cantorial works which were performed there.

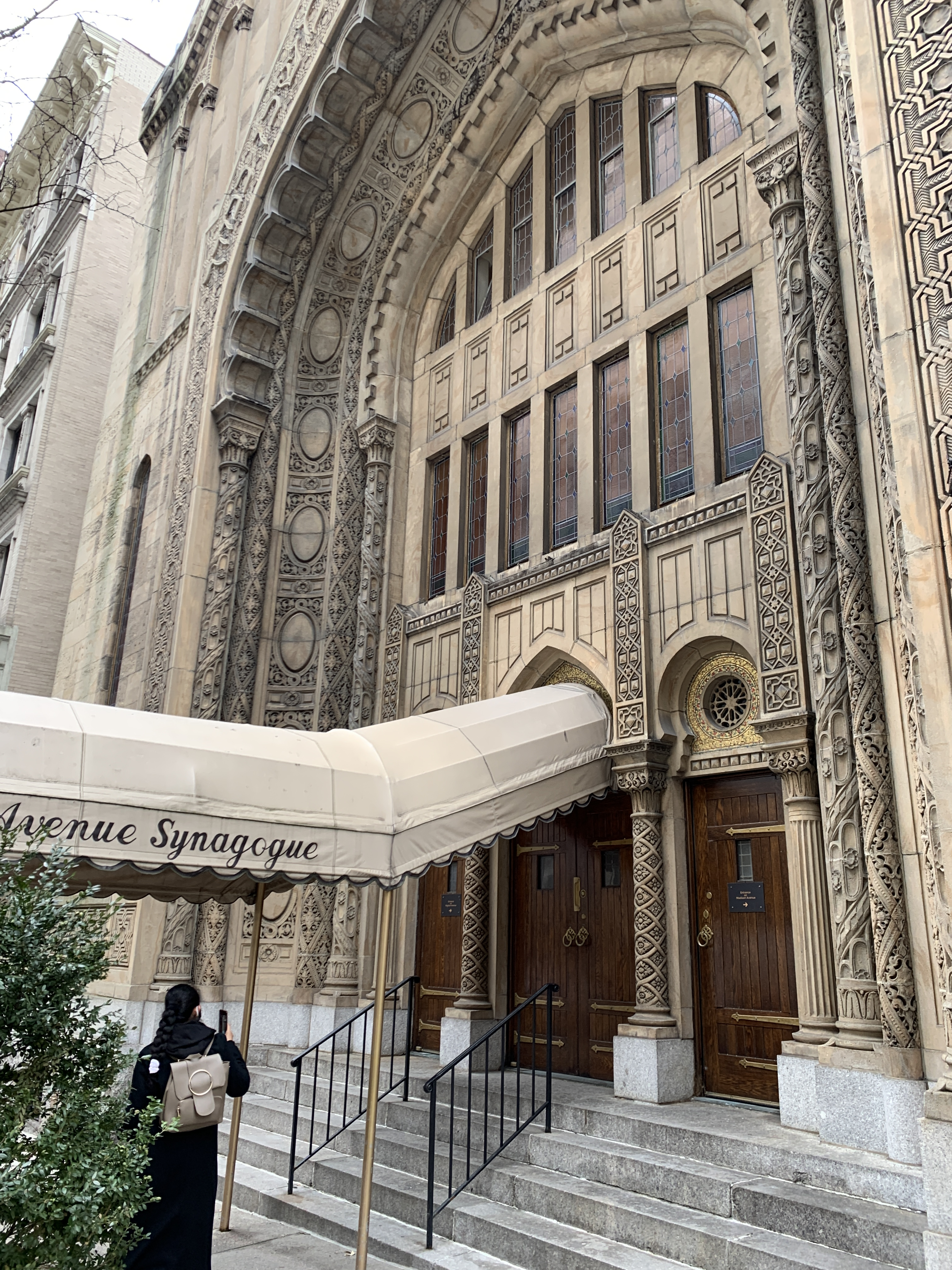
Park Avenue Synagogue

He released a number of enduring works in the years before and during World War II. His Binyomin der driter (Benjamin the third), a Yiddish-language choral ballad based on a story by Mendele Mocher Sforim, was performed at Carnegie Hall in 1938. His Cantata Shabbat Kodesh, a modern composed Sabbath service drawing on traditional themes, was debuted by Helfman's Temple Emanual Choral Society as part of a Hebraica programme in March 1942 at Carnegie Hall. It has remained one of his most popular pieces which has become part of the regular Synagogue repertoire in many places in the United States.

In 1944, he became Hebrew Arts Commissioner of the Zionist Youth Commission, an organization affiliated with the Histadrut Ivrit of America. This new role marked a turn away from Yiddish-language music drawing on Eastern European themes and an increased focus on Israeli music and Zionist ideals. In that role he also met Shlomo Bardin, a Zionist intellectual who had the patronage of Louis Brandeis. In 1945, Bardin recruited Helfman to take up a leadership role at the Brandeis Camp Institute. Helfman arrived with a firm belief that American Jewish youth had lost their passion for Jewish musical culture and soon built a large circle of teachers and students around him. He continued to compose during this period; in 1948 he conducted the premiere of one of his better-known Yiddish-language works, Di naye hagode, a Cantata about the 1943 Warsaw Ghetto Uprising. At around this time one of his largest choirs, the Freiheit Gezang Farein, was added to the list of subversive organizations by the House Un-American Activities Committee. It lost the support of its parent organization and many members left; in 1948 it renamed itself the Jewish People's Philharmonic Chorus. Helfman left and a recent German immigrant Leo Kopf took over as director.

Although he began at the Pennsylvania camp location, he later relocated to the main California camp, and finally settled permanently in Los Angeles in 1951. He was happy to find California to be a much more open environment which gave him space to try out new ideas. He soon began to work for the University of Judaism which had some overlap in faculty with the Brandeis Camp; he had long dreamed of opening a Jewish school of arts and he saw this new institution as a likely place to do so. In 1948–9 with the founding of the State of Israel, a new summer art institute studying its music was established at the Brandeis camp, with Helfman as director. However, that art institute only lasted until 1952.

In 1952 he was a founding member of the Hebrew Union College – Jewish Institute of Religion school of Sacred Music. After moving to Los Angeles, he also became music director at Temple Israel of Hollywood as well as at the Sinai Temple. For most of the 1950s, he divided his time between these various institutions, until 1957 when he was recruited to be full-time dean of the School of Fine Arts at the University of Judaism.

Helfman died of a heart attack while visiting Dallas, Texas on August 9, 1963.
