= Richard Goodman =

Richard Goodman may refer to:

- Richard Goodman (writer) (born 1945), American writer of nonfiction
- Richard Goodman (American football) (born 1987), American football wide receiver
- Richard Bryce Goodman, American sound engineer
- Dickie Goodman (Richard Dorian Goodman, 1934–1989), American music and record producer
- Kevin Cooper (prisoner) (Richard Goodman, born 1958), American mass murderer

== See also ==
- Rick Goodman (born 1955), American video game designer
- Richard Goodmanson (born 1947), American businessman
- Dic Goodman (1920–2013), Welsh poet
