= Pincus Goodman =

American poet

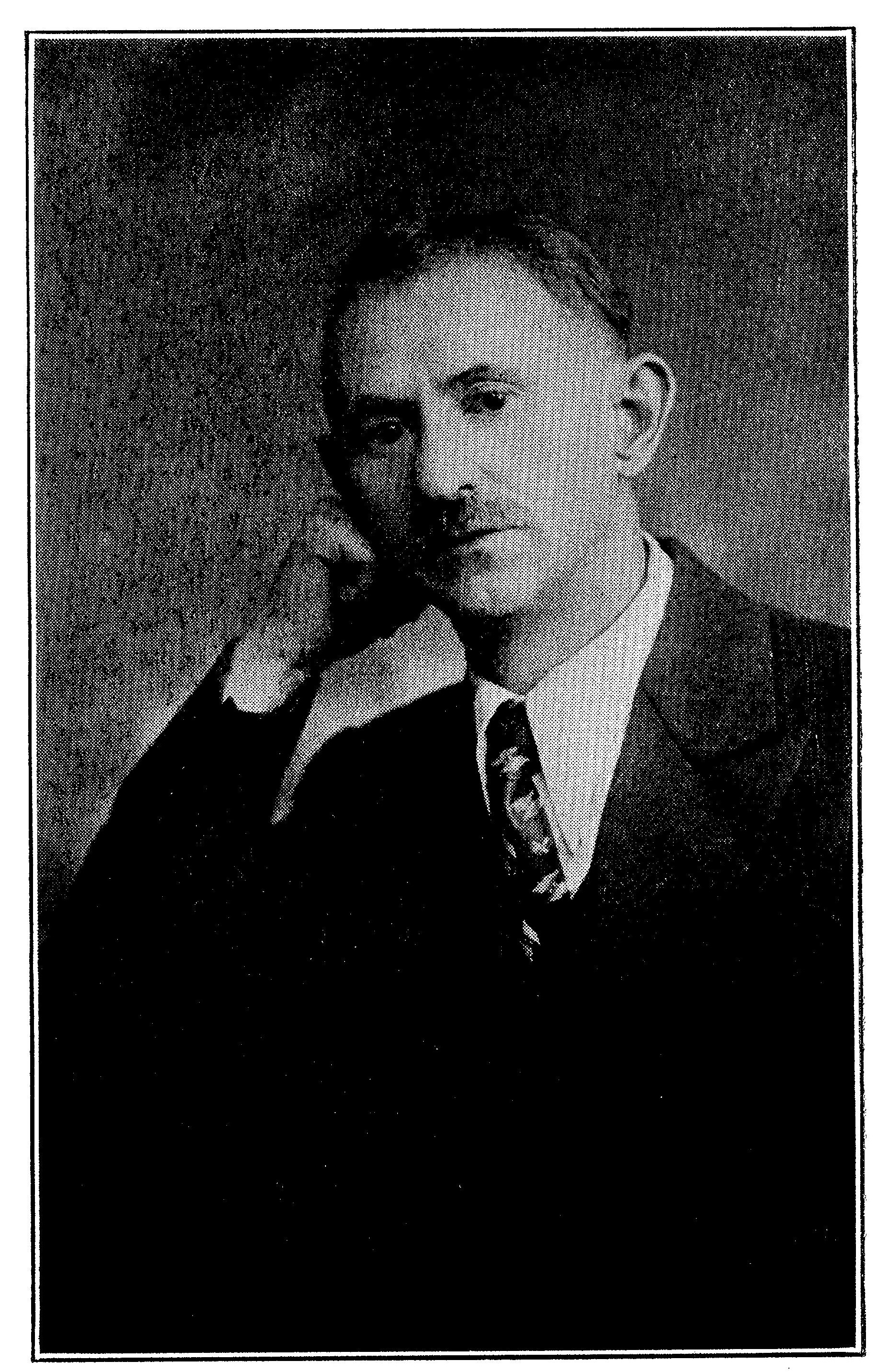
Pincus Goodman, Yiddish-language poet

Pincus Goodman (Yiddish: פינחס גודמאן, 1881–1947), who published as P. Goodman (פּ. גודמאַן), was an American Yiddish-language poet active from the 1920s to the 1940s. Because he worked as a silk weaver his whole life, he was known as the "weaver poet."

== Biography ==
Goodman was born in April 1881 in Łowicz, Poland. He had a traditional Jewish education and even considered studying to become a Rabbi before turning from religion to secular politics and becoming a freethinker. His parents both died in the 1881–1896 cholera pandemic when he was eight years old, leaving him an orphan. He became a weaver in Łódź, an important industrial centre in Poland which had a large Jewish silk-weaving industry.

He emigrated to the United States in 1902 or possibly 1904, settling in Paterson, New Jersey and continuing to work as a silk weaver for the rest of his life. Paterson was an important centre of Jewish weavers from Lodz and Bialystok who were known for their left-wing politics. He and his family lived in extreme poverty and he never became rich from his silk weaving or his writing. He soon became a member of the Arbeter Ring (worker's circle).

While continuing to work as a weaver, Goodman wrote poetry prolifically, printing pieces in The Jewish Daily Forward, Der Tog, Arbeter, and Fraye arbeter shtime. His works described themes of poverty, family, and work. Some of his poems were set to music and became popular in worker's choirs, such as the Vladimir Heifetz's Jewish Culture Society Chorus. It was only in 1922 that he managed to print his first book of poetry, Veber-lider (weaver songs). In it he made use of the rich Yiddish-language vocabulary of weaving and described the hard life of workers in the industry, two things which rarely appeared in literary works at the time. The following year, he published In geshpan: lider un gedikhten ("In Harness: Songs and poems"), which he ended up expanding into a larger volume in a second printing and which grew to five volumes over the next two decades. Although they were well regarded, he apparently published them at his own expense.

He died on January 23, 1947. He was buried in an Arbeter Ring cemetery in Saddle River, New Jersey.

== Family ==
He married his first wife Rebecca Pedlock in Łódź in 1902. They had a number of children: Annie (born 1903), Louis (born 1904), Rose (born 1906), David (born 1910). His first wife died in around 1914 of Bright's disease. He remarried in December 1919 to Rebecca (Becky) Diamond and they had a son Max (born 1921). Goodman is also the great-grandfather of novelist Tama Janowitz.

== Publications ==
- Veber-lider, also known as Der Ṿeber: balade ("The Weaver, Poems", 1922)
- In geshpan: lider un gedikhten volume 1 ("In Harness: Songs and poems" 1926)
- In geshpan: lider un gedikhten volume 2 (1932)
- In geshpan: lider un gedikhten volume 3 (1940)
- In geshpan: lider un gedikhten volume 4 (1945)
- In geshpan: lider un gedikhten volume 5 (1951)
