= Samuel Goodman (cricketer) =

American cricketer

Personal information
- Born: February 6, 1877; Philadelphia, Pennsylvania, U.S.
- Died: March 4, 1905 (aged 28); Philadelphia, Pennsylvania, U.S.
- Bowling: Right-arm fast
- Role: Bowler
- Relatives: William Goodman (brother)

Domestic team information
- Years: Team
- 1894: GS Patterson's XI
- 1895: Pennsylvania University Past and Present
- 1903: Philadelphia
- FC debut: August 15, 1894 GS Patterson's XI v RH Powel's XI
- Last FC: September 25, 1903 Philadelphia v Kent

Career statistics
Competition	First-class
Matches	4
Runs scored	17
Batting average	2.83
100s/50s	0/0
Top score	7
Balls bowled	288
Wickets	7
Bowling average	21.14
5 wickets in innings	0
10 wickets in match	0
Best bowling	3/37
Catches/stumpings	2/–
- Source: CricketArchive, December 8, 2007

Samuel Goodman (February 6, 1877 – March 4, 1905) was an American cricketer. A right-arm fast bowler, he played first-class cricket between 1894 and 1903.

== Biography ==
Goodman was born in Philadelphia, Pennsylvania, USA. He attended University of Pennsylvania between 1894 and 1896, where he captained the cricket team. During 1894, he went on a tour of Canada with Philadelphia, and played his first first-class matches for GS Patterson's XI.

In 1895, he first played for the United States national cricket team, playing against Canada in Toronto. He played a first-class match for Pennsylvania University Past and Present against F Mitchell's XI the same month. He played a second match for the USA against Canada in 1897, but was then absent from senior cricket until 1903, when he played his final first-class match for Philadelphia against the touring Kent team from England.

In July 1904, he played his final international for the USA against Canada in Philadelphia, and he died less than a year later. According to his obituary his death was the result of "spinal meningitis following pleuro-pneumonia and a bad strain caused by a fall in ju-jitsu."
