= Paul Goodman (historian) =

American historian

- Born: March 1, 1934; Brooklyn, New York
- Died: October 6, 1995 (aged 61); El Cerrito, California
- Education: Cornell University, Harvard University

Paul Goodman (1934–1995) was a historian of American and Jewish history, and professor emeritus at the University of California, Davis.

== Works ==
- The Democratic-Republicans of Massachusetts (1965)
- Essays in American Colonial History (1968)
- The American Constitution (1972)
- Towards a Christian Republic: Antimasonry and the Great Transition in New England, 1826–1836 (1988)
- Of One Blood: Abolitionism and the Origins of Racial Equality (1998)
