= Roy Goodman (disambiguation) =

Roy Goodman (born 1951) is a British conductor and violinist.

Roy Goodman may also refer to:

- Roy Goodman (racing driver) (born 1929), British racing driver
- Roy M. Goodman (1930–2014), New York politician
