= Debra Furr-Holden =

American epidemiologist

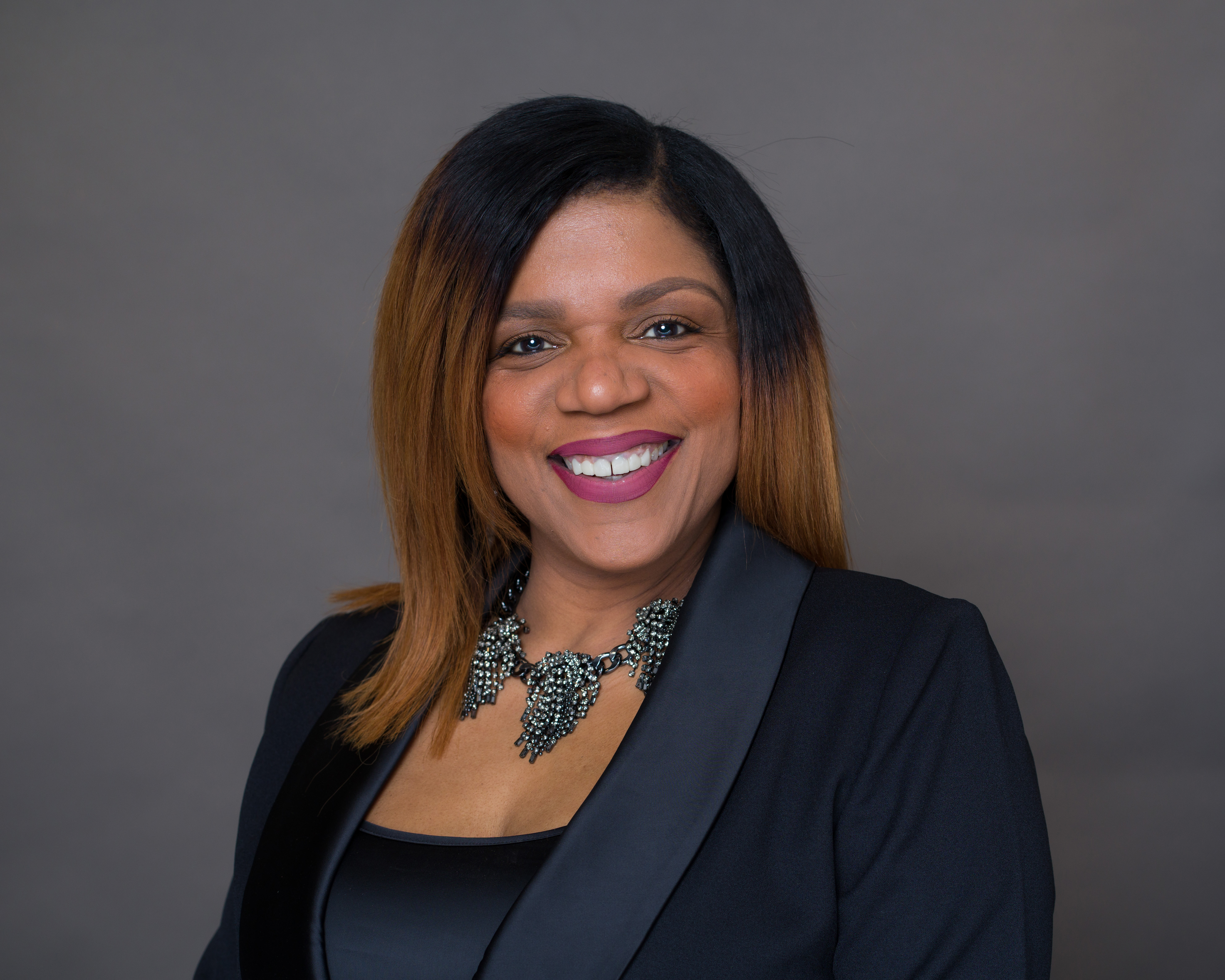
- Furr-Holden in 2022
- Born: June 28, 1974 (age 52); Washington, DC, USA
- Occupations: Epidemiologist and health equity researcher
- Children: Jordan, Gabriel, and Olivia Holden
- Awards: 2006 Presidential Early Career Award for Scientists and Engineers

Academic background
- Education: BA, 1996, Zanvyl Krieger School of Arts and Sciences; PhD, 1999, Johns Hopkins University School of Hygiene and Public Health
- Thesis: The Epidemiology of Drug Dependence: A U.S.-U.K Cross National Comparison (1999)
- Website: debrafurrholden.com

C. Debra M. Furr-Holden (born June 28, 1974) is an epidemiologist. She served as the school's Dean from July 1, 2022, to June 30, 2024.

== Early life and education ==
Born in Washington D.C. and raised in Seat Pleasant, Maryland and later in Flint, Michigan, Furr-Holden attended Flint Northern High School and graduated from Potomac High School in Oxon Hill, Maryland before enrolling at Johns Hopkins University (JHU) for her Bachelor of Arts degree and PhD. While attending freshman orientation at JHU, she encountered an "urban jungle," of liquor stores and drug needles. This inspired her to begin analyzing the environmental factors leading to poverty and substance abuse.

== Career ==
Upon receiving her PhD, Furr-Holden accepted an assistant professor position at Morgan State University where she stayed for one year. She subsequently left the school to obtain an Associate Research Scientist position at the Pacific Institute for Research and Evaluation. During her tenure at the Pacific Institute for Research and Evaluation, Furr-Holden established the Drug Investigations, Violence, and Environmental Studies Laboratory (DIVE) in 2005. The aim of the laboratory was to canvass Baltimore to gain insight on the character of the neighbourhood such as their relations to drugs and liquor. This project earned Furr-Holden one of the 56 Presidential Early Career Award for Scientists and Engineers in 2006.

In 2007, Furr-Holden moved the research project and laboratory to Johns Hopkins Bloomberg School of Public Health. As an assistant professor in Mental Health at the Bloomberg School, Furr-Holden used her Presidential Early Career Award to fund her research on how alcohol and drugs contribute to youth violence. In recognition of her accomplishments, she received the 2014 Joseph Cochin Young Investigator Award. In early 2016, Furr-Holden left JHU to accept a Full professor position at Michigan State University's (MSU) College of Human Medicine Division of Public Health. Upon joining the faculty at MSU, Furr-Holden established the Flint Center for Health Equity Solutions to "bring together policy-makers, community leaders and researchers to better serve the health of the Flint community."

As a result of her academic achievements, Furr-Holden was one of three professors appointed the Charles Stewart Mott Endowed Professors of Public Health for "using their expertise to improve the health of the Flint community." She was also chosen to represent the school in a new Invest Health initiative funded by the Reinvestment Fund and the Robert Wood Johnson Foundation. In this role, she would advise on how to best assist low-income communities in Flint and drive health efforts such as access to safe and affordable housing. In the same year, she was also elected to sit on the Public Health Advisory Commission, a 24-member commission that aimed to complete an assessment of the public health service delivery system in Michigan. By 2017, Furr-Holden was appointed interim director of the MSU College of Human Medicine Division of Public Health while continuing her roles as director of the Flint Center for Health Equity Solutions and co-director of the Healthy Flint Research Coordinating Center.

In 2019, Furr-Holden was appointed to MSU's College of Human Medicine's dean's executive team as the associate dean for public health integration. While serving in this role, Furr-Holden was named to various government task forces including the Michigan Coronavirus Task Force on Racial Disparities and a Flint task force to help give input from the community to law enforcement. On September 27, 2020, Furr-Holden was appointed to the Ruth Mott Foundation Board of Trustees. She also sat on the editorial board for the Drug and Alcohol Dependence journal and Health Equity journal.

In 2022, Furr-Holden was named dean of the New York University's School of Global Public Health, effective July 1, 2022. She was elected to the National Academy of Medicine in 2023. Furr-Holden announced stepping down as Dean of the NYU School of Global Public Health in March 2024 (effective July 1, 2024).

== Personal life ==
Furr-Holden and her ex-husband have three children together.
