= Saul Goodman (disambiguation) =

Saul Goodman is a fictional lawyer in the TV series Breaking Bad and Better Call Saul.

Saul Goodman may also refer to:

- Saul Goodman (percussionist) (1907–1996), American timpanist
- Saul Goodman, a fictional detective in the novel series The Illuminatus! Trilogy
- Saul Goodman, an unseen character in the British sitcom Friday Night Dinner

== See also ==
- Shaul Gutman, a similarly named Israeli Politician
- Saul (disambiguation)
- Goodman (disambiguation)
