= Francis Adam Goodman =

American politician (1827–1898)

Hon. Francis Adam Goodman

Francis Adam Goodman (March 3, 1827 – February 1, 1898) served the public most of his life as a politician and as a Union Army soldier. He was born March 3, 1827, in Rimbach, Grand Duchy of Hesse, the son of Wilhelm and Mary (Albrecht) Gutmann. He died on 1 February 1898 in Burnips, Michigan, United States (Allegan County).

== Marriage ==
He was married on March 5, 1852, to Christina Slagel, daughter of Balthasar and Genovefa (Casper) Schlegel in Marion, Ohio, and to that union were born eleven children.

Affidavit of Mary Slagel (military pension application #784.354)

I have known Christina Slagel, formerly Slagel, the above named claimant for fifty-nine years, or ever since she was a small girl. I lived neighbor to her and Francis Goodman, her husband, before and at the time they were married and know that neither of them were married before their marriage to each other and have lived neighbor to them ever since that time, except about eight years when they mooved (sic.) to Michigan, but eight years after they came to Mich. (sic.), I mooved (sic.) to Mich. (sic.) and lived near neighbor since and know they lived together as man and wife until the death of Francis Goodman and know that Christina Goodman has not again married. I am a sister-in-law to the claimant, having married her brother Tobias Slagel in the year 1848

— 9 December 1901

When Francis & Christina first settled in Allegan Co, Michigan, two miles west of Bunker Hill, their home had no windows, just one door. Christina hung cloth over the door, but still couldn't sleep because of the howling and noise from all the bears, panthers, foxes, and wolves.

Affidavit of Lewis R. Heasley (military pension application #759.851)

For the past five years I have lived within a mile and quarter of her present home, which is a small house and lot near Burnips Corners, it is worth about two hundred and fifty or three hundred dollars, and in my judgement (sic.) the rental value of the property would be from twenty-five to thirty dollars per year, or about ten per cent (sic.) of its cash value.

— 25 May 1906

== Military ==
Goodman served as a private in the Ninth Michigan Infantry, Company D during the American Civil War (Army of the Cumberland). He was honorably discharged 20 June 1865.

== Politics ==
From Bingham, S.D. (Stephen D.) (1888). "s.v., Goodman, Francis". Early history of Michigan, with biographies of state officers, members of Congress, judges and legislators: Pub. pursuant to act 59, 1887. Lansing: Thorp & Godfrey, State Printers and Binders. p. 295.

Representative from Allegan county in 1881-2-3, was born in Hesse Darmstadt, Germany, March 3, 1827. Came to Baltimore in 1830, lived in Pennsylvania and then in Ohio, where he was educated. He settled in Salem, Allegan county, Mich., in 1855. Has been supervisor nine years, justice four years, and held other local offices. Served ten months in the 9th Michigan infantry. In politics a Republican.

from "A Twentieth Century History of Allegan County, Michigan" compiled under the editorial supervision of Dr. Henry F. Thomas, Allegan:

Francis Goodman served two terms in the state Legislature as Representative beginning in 1881 and 1883. His son, Wm. H. Goodman served two terms and county Treasurer beginning in 1893 and 1895.

== Biography ==
(source: biography from "Portrait and Biographical record of Kalamazoo, Allegan and Van Buren Counties, Michigan," published by Chapman Bros., Chicago in 1892)

This prominent and respected resident of Salem Township, Allegan Co. is living retired from the active duties of life on his beautiful farm of one hundred and 20 acres (81,000 m^{2}), on section 18. His estate bears all the modern improvements, and by a proper rotation of crops, has been brought to a high degree of cultivation. He has erected the various buildings on his place which best subserve the purpose of a first class agriculturalist, and is ranked among the well-to-do citizens of Allegan County.

The gentleman whose name heads this sketch is the son of William and Mary E. (Albright) Goodman, natives of Germany, where our subject was born March 3, 1827. Three years later, his parents emigrated to America and located in Franklin Co., PA, near the village of Waynesboro. There the father rented a farm for two years, after which he purchased 50 acres (200,000 m^{2}) of land at the foot of the mountains, which he made his home the succeeding six years. He then came west to Richland Co., Ohio, and after a residence there of two years, removed to Marion Co., the same state, where he erected a log house, and improved his land. Eight years later, he sold his property and removed to Crestline, Ohio where he remained twelve months and in 1853 came to Allegan Co., Michigan, where he entered a half-section of land from the government. He made that tract of land his home the remainder of his life and died August 18, 1882 ant the age of eighty-three years. His good wife followed him, a few years later, to the better land, passing away in 1886 aged eighty four years.

The grandfather of Francis Goodman was a native of Alsace-Lorraine, and served under Napoleon during his Russian campaign never returning. It is probable that he perished in the snows on their retreat from Moscow. His widow moved over the line into Hesse-Darmstadt, Germany, where she reared her only child—our subject's father.

Mr. Goodman, of this sketch, was only given limited educational advantages. He aided in the erection of the first store building in Crestline, Ohio. March 5, 1852 he was happily married to Christina Slagel, daughter of Balthaster Slagel. Mrs. Goodman was a native of the Fatherland, and at the time of the marriage to our subject was residing in Marion Co., Ohio. Their union has been blessed by the birth of eleven children: Mary Ann, William H., Elizabeth, David J., Loretta, Caroline S., Katy, Maggie, Francis A., Savilla, & Joseph W. Mary Ann married Lewis Moomey and makes her home in Salem, Allegan Co.; William H. married Alice Hartman and resides at Burnips Corners where he is engaged in conducting a general store; Elizabeth, Mrs. Lyman Baker, is also a resident of Salem; David who is unmarried, is assisting in the general store at Burnips Corners; Loretta, Mrs. Nahum Snook, lives in Grand Rapids; Caroline S. married Luther Johnson and the make their home in Salem Township; Katy became Mrs. Noble Moored and lives at Grand Rapids; Maggie, who is unmarried is a dressmaker in Grand Rapids; Francis A. is also single and with Savilla, resides with the parents; and Joseph W., who married Lucy Fleser, and is a farmer.

In politics, the Hon. Francis Goodman is an influential member of the Republican Party. He has been honored by his fellow-townsmen by being elected to various offices of trust and responsibility within their gift, serving as Supervisor of Salem Township for ten terms.

He also was Commissioner and Justice of the Peace, serving in the latter office two terms. He was nominated on the Republican ticket, to represent the Second District in the State Legislature, and was elected over his opponent Theodore Castor, a Union candidate, by a majority of three hundred and sixty nine. While in that body, he served on the Committee of the Horticultural and Agricultural College. He was re-elected to the same office in the fall of 1882, over Henry E. Blackman, a Union candidate, and during that term was Chairman of the Committee on Horticulture and State Institutions. Since that time he has not been active in politics.

During the late war (Civil) our subject enlisted in Company D, Ninth Michigan Infantry, his regiment being sent to join the Army of the Cumberland. He served bravely in the defense of his country until the close of the war, receiving his honorable discharge, June 20, 1865.

In 1853, or subject purchased the land on which he resides, and, starting out in life with nothing but strong hands and a determination to win a competency, he has made a success of his undertaking, as he is one of the prominent and well-to-do residents of the County. Socially, the Hon. Mr. Goodman is a member of Salem Lodge No. 169, I.O.O.F., in which order he is Past Noble Grand. He is one of the oldest settlers in Salem Township, and is greatly honored and respected in his community.
