= Anthony A. Goodman =

American novelist

Anthony A. Goodman (born January 11, 1940) is an American breast cancer surgeon and author. He is adjunct professor of medicine at Montana State University WWAMI Medical Sciences Program and is affiliate professor in the Department of Biological Structure at the University of Washington School of Medicine.

== Biography ==
Goodman earned a B.A. from Harvard College, and an M.D. from Cornell Medical College. He trained as a surgical intern and resident at the University of Michigan Medical Center in Ann Arbor. He completed his surgical training and served as chief resident at the Harvard Surgical Service of Boston City Hospital, the New England Deaconess Hospital, the Lahey Clinic, and Cambridge Hospital.

For 20 years, he worked as a general surgeon in south Florida and served as Clinical Associate Professor of Surgery at the University of Miami School of Medicine.

He also served as a surgeon with the U.S. Army Medical Corps during the Vietnam War and on the hospital ship, Project HOPE.

He was also Visiting Professor of Surgery at the Christchurch, New Zealand, Clinical School of Medicine. Founder of the Broward Surgical Society, Dr. Goodman is a Fellow of the American College of Surgeons and a Diplomate of the National Board of Medical Examiners and the American Board of Surgery.

Dr. Goodman has recorded several medical courses for The Great Courses, a video publisher in Chantilly, Virginia. These have included Understanding The Human Body: Anatomy and Physiology, The Human Body: How We Fail; How We Heal, Lifelong Health: Achieving Optimum Well-Being at Any Age and Myths of Nutrition and Fitness.

== As author ==
- None But the Brave: A Novel of the Surgeons of World War II. Deer Creek Publishing Group. 2012
- The Shadow of God: A Novel of War and Faith, published in four languages worldwide. Sourcebooks, 2002
- Never Say Die: A Doctor and Patient Talk About Breast Cancer. Appleton-Century-Crofts, 1980.

== See also ==
- WWAMI Regional Medical Education Program
