= George Goodman (Royal Navy officer) =

Recipient of the George Cross

George Herbert Goodman
- Born: 25 November 1900; Bromsgrove, England
- Died: 31 May 1945 (aged 44); Rotterdam, Netherlands
- Burial place: The Hague (Westduin) General Cemetery
- Military career
- Allegiance: United Kingdom
- Branch: Royal Naval Volunteer Reserve
- Service years: 1939–1945
- Rank: Lieutenant commander
- Units: HMS President; HMS Vernon
- Conflicts: Second World War
- Awards: George Cross; Member of the Order of the British Empire

Lieutenant Commander George Herbert Goodman, GC, MBE (25 November 1900 – 31 May 1945) of the Royal Navy Volunteer Reserve was awarded the George Cross for the "great gallantry and undaunted devotion to duty" he showed on 15 January 1942 in defusing an Italian circling torpedo.

== Naval career ==
Goodman was attached to HMS Vernon, HMS President and HMS Nile (Alexandria) and rendered many unexploded devices safe during the war in Britain and North Africa.

=== George Cross ===
Goodman was the first person to defuse the Italian self-destructing torpedo which had beached itself east of Alexandria. He was assisted in this action by Petty Officer William Filer and painter Archibald John Russell, both of whom received the George Medal.

Notice of Goodman's George Cross appeared in the London Gazette on 15 September 1942, reading:

The King has been graciously pleased to approve the award of the George Cross for great gallantry and undaunted devotion to duty to:
Temporary Lieutenant George Herbert Goodman, M.B.E., R.N.V.R.

== Death ==
Goodman died when a booby-trap exploded in a house in Rotterdam, on 31 May 1945.
