= Walter Goodman =

Walter Goodman may refer to:

- Walter Goodman (artist) (1838–1912), English painter, illustrator, and writer
- Walter Goodman (cricketer) (1872–1910), Barbadian cricketer
- Walter Goodman (critic) (1927–2002), American journalist and writer
