= John Goodman (disambiguation) =

John Goodman (born 1952) is an American actor.

John Goodman may also refer to:

== People ==
- John Goodman (MP) (c. 1540–1604), MP for Lichfield
- John Goodman (dean of Wells) (c. 1500–1561)
- John Goodman (pilgrim) (c. 1595–1623/27), early pilgrim to the Americas in the 1620s
- John Goodman (Jesuit) (1590–1642), Welsh priest
- John Goodman (Australian politician) (1828–1874), pastoralist and politician in colonial Victoria
- John Goodman (Velocette) (1857–1929), motorcycle pioneer
- John Goodman (athlete) (born 1937), Australian Olympic sprinter
- John Goodman (American football) (born 1958), American football player
- John B. Goodman (art director) (1901–1991), American art director
- John B. Goodman (industrialist) (born 1963), American multi-millionaire and polo player
- Johnny Goodman (1909–1970), American golfer
- Johnny Goodman (TV producer) (1927–2015), British television producer
- John C. Goodman (born 1946), American economist
- John F. Goodman (born 1945), U.S. Marine Corps general
- John Reinhard Goodman (died 1865), Episcopal clergyman who served as Chaplain of the Senate

== Other ==
- John Goodman (EP), a comedy EP by Nina West

== See also ==
- John Goodmanson (born 1968), American recording engineer
- Jon Goodman (born 1971), former footballer
- Jack Goodman (born 1973), Republican member of the Missouri Senate
- Jack Goodman (footballer) (born 2005), English footballer
