= James Goodman =

James Goodman may refer to:

- James Goodman (cricketer) (born 1990), Kent County Cricket Club cricketer
- James Goodman (musicologist) (1828–1896), clergyman, professor of Irish, and collector of Irish music
- James A. Goodman (born 1936), American politician
- James R. Goodman (born 1944), professor of computer science at the University of Auckland, New Zealand
- James U. Goodman (1872–1953), American politician
- Jim Goodman (American football), American football coach, scout, and executive
