= Morris Goodman =

Morris Goodman may refer to:

- Morris Goodman (scientist) (1925–2010), American scientist in molecular evolution and molecular systematics
- Morris E. Goodman (born 1945), American motivational speaker and author
- Morris L. Goodman, Los Angeles city councilmember
- Martin Goodman (publisher) (1908–1992), also known as Morris Goodman, American publisher
