= Guthman =

Guthman is a surname. Notable people with the surname include:

- Edwin O. Guthman (1919–2008), American journalist and university professor
- Gary Guthman (born 1952), American jazz musician
- Les Guthman, American director, writer, and production executive

== See also ==
- Gutmann (disambiguation)
- Guttman
