= Joseph Goodman =

Joseph Goodman may refer to:

- Joseph Goodman (game designer), role-playing game designer
- Joseph T. Goodman, journalist and archaeologist
- Joseph W. Goodman, engineer and physicist
