= David Goodman =

David Goodman may refer to:

- David Goodman (athlete) (born 1958), Australian Paralympian
- David Goodman (chess player) (born 1958), British international master chess player
- David Goodman (Medal of Honor) (1846–?), private in the U.S. Army
- David Goodman (politician) (born 1967), member of the Ohio Senate
- Dave Goodman (record producer) (1951–2005), English musician and early sound engineer/record producer for the Sex Pistols
- David A. Goodman (born 1962), American writer and producer
- David G. Goodman (1946–2011), American Japanologist
- David H. Goodman (fl. 1997), American television writer and producer
- David S. G. Goodman (born 1948), Australian academic
- David Zelag Goodman (1930–2011), film and television writer
- Dave "Boss" Goodman, resident chef and DJ at Dingwalls, road manager for the Deviants and Pink Fairies

== See also ==
- David Goodman Mandelbaum (1911–1987), American anthropologist
- David Goodman Croly (1829–1889), American journalist
