= Martin Goodman =

Martin Goodman may refer to:

- Martin Goodman (historian) (born 1953), British historian and academic
- Martin Goodman (publisher) (1908–1992), American publisher
- Martin J. Goodman (born 1956), English author and journalist
- Martin Wise Goodman, Canadian journalist, editor-in-chief of The Toronto Star
- Martin Goodman, character in British sitcom Friday Night Dinner, played by Paul Ritter
