= William Ernest Goodman =

American cricketer (1879–1949)

William Goodman
Personal information
- Full name: William Ernest Goodman
- Born: September 29, 1879; Pennsylvania, U.S.
- Died: April 26, 1949 (aged 69); Rittenhouse Square, Philadelphia, Pennsylvania, U.S.

Domestic team information
- Years: Team
- 1899: Philadelphia
- Source: CricketArchive, December 5, 2007

William Ernest Goodman (September 29, 1879 – April 26, 1949) was an American cricketer. He was born in Pennsylvania, USA. His brother Samuel was also a notable American cricketer. William Goodman died in Philadelphia in 1949.

== Career ==
Goodman made his debut for the United States national cricket team in August 1899, playing against Canada in Rosedale, Toronto. The following month, he played for Philadelphia against All New York on Staten Island.

In October 1899, he played his only first-class match for Philadelphia against KS Ranjitsinhji's XI. He played one more time for the US national side against Canada the following September, and later played for the Straits Settlements against the Federated Malay States in August 1909.
