= Richard Goodmanson =

American businessman

Richard Goodmanson is an American businessman born in August 1947.

== Education ==
Goodmanson's degrees include an MBA, BEc and BCom, B Eng (Civil).

== Career ==
Goodmanson was director of Rio Tinto from 2004 until 2018. He was elected by shareholders in 2005 and stood for re-election in 2008. Goodmanson was also the chairman of the Committee on social and environmental accountability.

Goodmanson worked at senior levels for McKinsey & Company, PepsiCo and America West Airlines, where he was president and CEO.

Goodmanson joined DuPont in early 1999 and became executive vice president and chief operating officer at that time. In that role he was responsible for global functions, and the non US operations of DuPont, with particular focus on growth in emerging markets. Goodmanson retired from DuPont in September 2009.

Goodmanson was also chairman of the United Way of Delaware since 2006 and a director since 2002. He was a director of Qantas from 2008 until 2019.
