= Leib Kvitko =

Leyb Kvitko
- Born: Leyb Moiseyevich Kvitko; October 15, 1890; Goloskov, Podolia Governorate, Russian Empire
- Died: August 12, 1952 (aged 61); Moscow, Soviet Union
- Occupation: Poet

Leyb Moiseyevich Kvitko (Russian: Лев Моисе́евич Кви́тко, Yiddish: לייב קוויטקאָ; October 15, 1890 – August 12, 1952) was a prominent Yiddish poet, an author of well-known children's poems and a member of the Jewish Anti-Fascist Committee (JAC). He was one of the editors of Eynikayt (the JAC's newspaper) and of the Heymland, a literary magazine. He was executed in Moscow on August 12, 1952, together with twelve other members of the JAC, a massacre known as the Night of the Murdered Poets. Kvitko was rehabilitated in 1955.

== Biography ==
He was born in a Ukrainian shtetl, attended traditional Jewish religious school for boys (cheder) and was orphaned early. He moved to Kyiv in 1917 and soon became one of the leading Yiddish poets of the "Kiev Group". He lived in Germany between 1921 and 1925 joining there the Communist Party of Germany and publishing critically acclaimed poetry. He returned to the Soviet Union in 1925 and moved to Moscow in 1936, joining the CPSU in 1939. By that time he was primarily writing verses for children and his style fully corresponded to the canons of socialist realism. He has family who still live in Ukraine. Some family is also located in the United States of America and Canada.

== Gallery ==
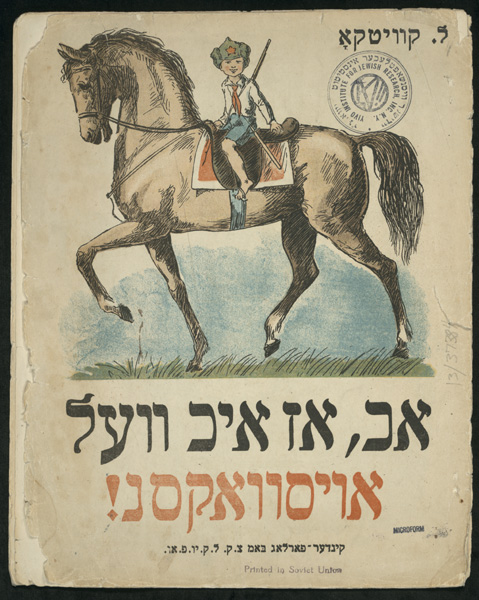
Children's book by Kvitko

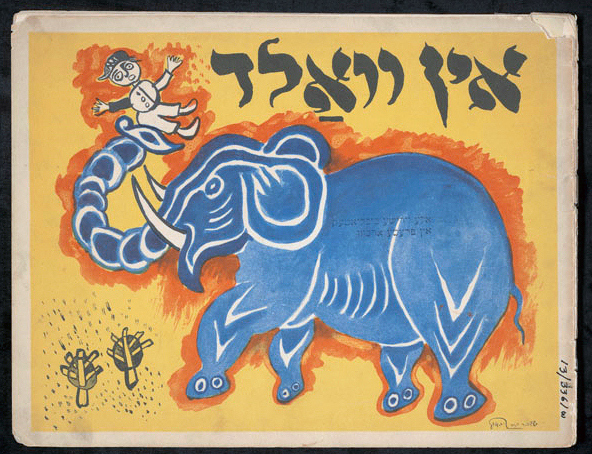
In vald L Kvitko tseykhenungen Y Ribak, children's book cover

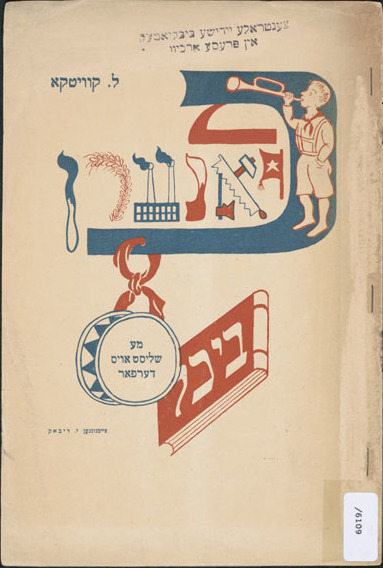

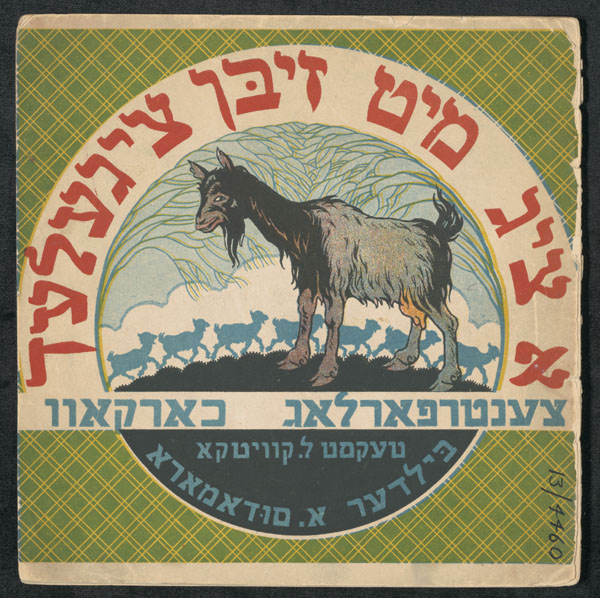

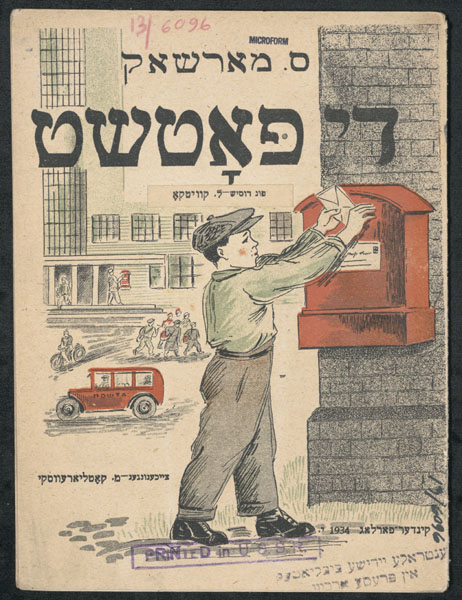
