= Lazar Weiner =

Russian-born American classical composer (1897–1982)

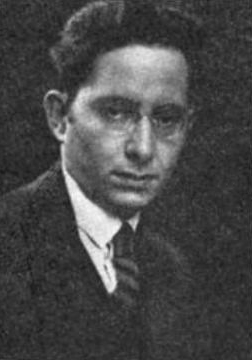
- Born: October 24, 1897; Cherkasy, Russian Empire
- Died: January 10, 1982 (aged 84); New York, New York, US
- Education: Kiev Conservatory
- Occupation: Composer
- Children: 2 sons, incl. Yehudi Wyner

Lazar Weiner (Yiddish: לאַזאַר װײַנער, October 24, 1897 – January 10, 1982) was a Russian and American composer of Jewish music. He also worked as conductor, vocal coach, and accompanist.

== Biography ==
Lazar Weiner was born in Cherkasy in the Russian Empire on October 24, 1897. He was trained as a pianist at the Kiev Conservatory where he began his studies at the age of 13. He emigrated to America at the age of 17 and settled in New York City where he worked as a choral conductor and music director of the Mendelssohn Symphony Orchestra of Brooklyn. He studied music composition in New York with Frederick Jacobi and Robert Russell Bennett, and was also well known vocal coach in Manhattan. In 1923 he cofounded the Freiheit Gezang Farein, a Yiddish chorus.

Weiner later became the music director of the Central Synagogue in Manhattan. He also taught on the faculties of Jewish Theological Seminary of America and Hebrew Union College, and was music director of the WABC radio program The Messiah of Israel.

He died in New York City on January 10, 1982. The composer Yehudi Wyner was his son.

== Works ==
Weiner composed more than 200 art songs as well as Yiddish and Hebrew cantatas and full synagogue services. He wrote several cantatas, among them Legend of Toil (1933), Fight for Freedom (1943), and To Thee, America (1944). He also wrote the music to the Yiddish play Generations of Green Fields (1974). His opera The Golem was staged at the 92nd Street Y in 1981.
