= Gutman =

Gutman is a surname. Notable people with the surname include:

- Adele Gutman Nathan (1889–1986), American writer
- Alberto Gutman (1959–2019), American politician
- Albin Gutman (born 1947), Slovene general
- Alexander Gutman (1945–2016), Russian film director
- Amy Gutman (born 1960), American novelist
- Anthony Gutman, British banker
- Dan Gutman (born 1955), American author
- Daniel Gutman (1901–1993), American lawyer, state senator, state assemblyman, president justice of the municipal court, and law school dean
- Elizabeth Gutman Kaye (1887–1971), American soprano and watercolorist
- Gloria M Gutman (born 1939), Canadian gerontologist
- Herbert Gutman (1928–1985), American labor historian and scholar of slavery
- Howard W. Gutman (born 1956), American ambassador
- Huck Gutman (born c.1944), American academic and political adviser
- Hugo Gutmann (1880–1962) German-Jewish veteran of First World War, famously known as Adolf Hitler's superior officer
- Israel Gutman (1923–2013), Israeli historian
- Iván Gutman (born 1947), Serbian chemist and mathematician
- Jacob C. Gutman (1890–1982), American businessman and philanthropist
- Jorge Castañeda Gutman (born 1953), Mexican politician and author
- Laura Gutman (born 1958), Argentinean therapist
- Lev Gutman (born 1945), Latvian–Israeli–German chess grandmaster
- Matt Gutman (born 1977), American journalist
- Nachum Gutman (1898–1980), Israeli painter, sculptor, and author
- Natalia Gutman (born 1942), Russian cellist
- René Gutman (born 1950), French Orthodox rabbi
- Rinat Gutman (born 1980), Israeli musician
- Roy Gutman (born 1944), American journalist and author
- Shaul Gutman (born 1945), Israeli academic and politician
- Teodor Gutman (1905–1995), Soviet pianist

== Fictional characters ==
- Casper Gutman, villain in the novel The Maltese Falcon and various film adaptations

== See also ==
- Gutmans (disambiguation)
- Gutmann (disambiguation)
- Guttman
- Guttmann
- Goodman (disambiguation)
