= Guttman =

Guttman is a surname. It may refer to:

- Amos Guttman (1954–1993), Israeli film director
- Bela Guttman (1899–1981), Hungarian football manager
- Cole Guttman (born 1999), American ice hockey player
- David Guttman (1883–1940), Swedish long-distance runner
- Egon Guttman (1927–2021), American law professor
- Eli Guttman (born 1958), Israeli football manager
- Elizabeth Guttman (born 1961), American actress with the stage name Elizabeth Daily
- Freda Guttman (born 1934), Canadian multidisciplinary artist and activist
- Howard M. Guttman (born 1951), American management consultant
- Irving Guttman (1928–2014), Canadian stage director
- Louis Guttman (1916–1987), Israeli sociologist, inventor of the Guttman scale
- Norman Guttman (1920–1982), American psychologist
- Peter Guttman (photographer), American photographer
- Reuben Guttman (born 1959), American attorney
- Ronald Guttman (born 1952), Belgian actor and producer
- Shmarya Guttman (1909–1996), Israeli archaeologist

== See also ==
- Guttman scale
- Gutman
- Gutmann (disambiguation)
- Guttmann
- Gutt
