= Gutmann (surname) =

Gutmann is a German or Jewish surname, colloquially meaning "husband", "yeoman", or "working man" (as opposed to "noble" or "gentleman").

Gutmann Surname Meaning:

The surname "Gutmann" is of German and Ashkenazi Jewish origin. It is composed of the German words "gut," meaning "good," and "mann," meaning "man." As such, it can be translated to "good man." The name may have been a descriptive or given name in its early uses, possibly indicating a person known for good character or conduct.

In Jewish communities, surnames like Gutmann were often adopted during periods when European governments required Jews to take permanent family names. It is also a surname that may be found across other German-speaking regions, with various spellings like "Goodman" or "Guttman" depending on historical and regional influences.

Historically, the name is not tied to any one specific occupation or class, and one might find Gutmanns across a range of professions and social standings, from merchants and bankers to scholars and rabbis. There are also notable individuals with this surname in modern history, including businessmen, artists, and academics.

The surname "Gutmann" is relatively uncommon compared to more widespread names like "Smith" or "Müller." It is more prevalent in regions with historical Jewish and German populations, such as Germany, Austria, and parts of Eastern Europe. Outside of these areas, particularly in English-speaking countries, it is not commonly encountered.

That said, "Gutmann" and its variations (like "Goodman," "Guttman," etc.) can be found in diaspora communities, particularly among Jewish families who immigrated to North America, South America, and other parts of the world in the 19th and 20th centuries. In those communities, variations of the surname may have become slightly more common. However, on a global scale, "Gutmann" remains relatively rare.

Notable people with the name include:

- Adolphe Gutmann (1819–1882), German pianist and composer
- Amy Gutmann (born 1949), American diplomat, academic and president of the University of Pennsylvania
- Bessie Pease Gutmann (1876–1960), American artist and illustrator
- Edmund Gutmann (1841–1918), Croatian nobleman, industrialist, and co-founder of Belišće, Croatia
- Elisabeth von Gutmann (1875–1947), Princess of Liechtenstein
- Friedrich Gutmann (died April 1944), Dutch banker and art collector
- Galit Gutmann (born 1972), Israeli actress and fashion model
- Gerrie Gutmann (1921–1969), American post-surrealist painter
- Hugo Gutmann (1880–1971), German-Jewish veteran of World War I who was Adolf Hitler's superior officer during the war
- John Gutmann (1905–1998), American photographer and painter
- Lara Naki Gutmann (born 2002), Italian figure skater
- Mike Gutmann (born 1962), Swiss cyclist
- Otmar Gutmann (1937–1993), German television producer, animator, and director
- Peter Gutmann (computer scientist), New Zealand computer scientist who invented the Gutmann method
- Peter Gutmann (journalist) (born 1949), American journalist and attorney
- Tobias Gutmann Feder (c. 1760–1817), Maskilic writer, poet, and grammarian
- Viktor Gutmann (1891–1946), Croatian nobleman and industrialist
- Wilhelm Isak, Ritter von Gutmann (1826–1895), Austrian entrepreneur
- Willi Gutmann (1927–2013), Swiss sculptor

== See also ==
- Gutman
- Guttmann
- Guttman
