= Guttmann =

Guttmann is a surname. It may refer to the following people:

- Artur Guttmann (1891–1945), Austrian film score composer
- Béla Guttmann (1899–1981), Hungarian football (soccer) player and coach
- Jakob Guttmann (rabbi) (1845–1919), German rabbi and religious Zionism philosopher
- Jakob Guttmann (sculptor) (1811–1860), Hungarian sculptor
- Julius Guttmann (1880–1950), German rabbi, historian of Judaism-philosophy, son of Jakob
- Ludwig Guttmann (1899–1980), German-born neurologist and founding father of organized physical activities for the disabled
- Paul Guttmann (1834–1893), German pathologist
- Ronald D. Guttmann (born 1936), American physician

== See also ==
- Guttman
- Gutmann (disambiguation)
- Gutman
- Gutmans (disambiguation)
- Goodman (disambiguation)
