= Jakob Guttmann =

Jakob Guttmann may refer to:

- Jakob Guttmann (rabbi) (1845–1919), German rabbi
- Jakob Guttmann (sculptor) (1811–1860), Hungarian Jewish sculptor
