= Portrait of Fräulein Lieser =

1917 painting by Gustav Klimt

- Bildnis Fräulein Lieser (German)
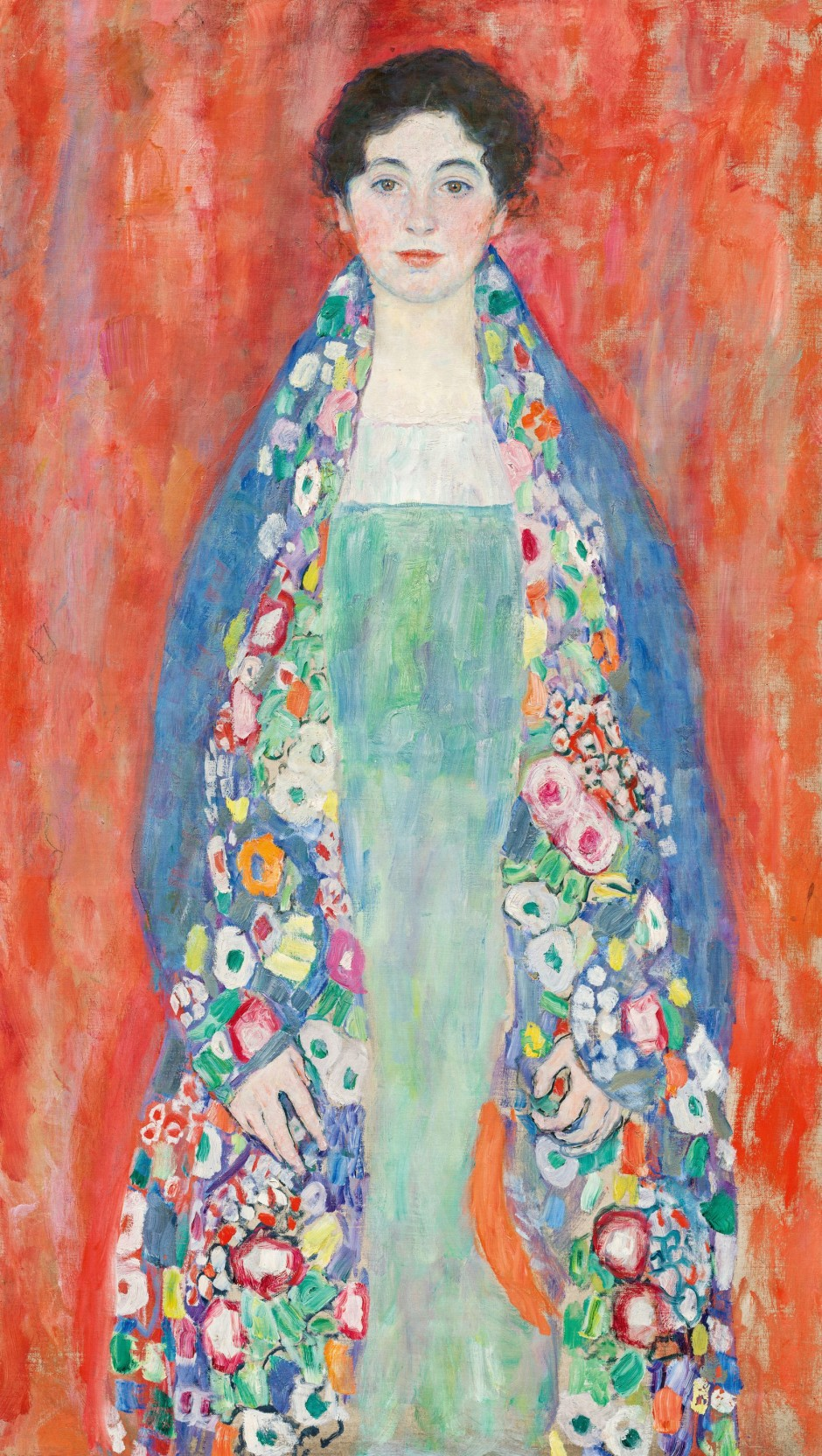
- Artist: Gustav Klimt
- Year: 1917
- Medium: Oil on canvas
- Dimensions: 140 cm × 80 cm (55 in × 31 in)
- Location: Private collection

Portrait of Fräulein Lieser (German: Bildnis Fräulein Lieser) is a portrait created by Gustav Klimt. Painted in 1917, the piece was left unsigned in his studio when he died in 1918. It was presumed lost or broken by experts until it was discovered in adequate condition in 2024.

In April 2024, it was sold by the im Kinsky auction house in Vienna for €30 million to a private collector.

== Description ==
The three-quarter painting depicts a young woman in a frontal pose against a red backdrop. A cloak draped around her shoulders is decorated with flowers. The colour palette is typical of Klimt's later work.

The young woman is thought to be a member of the Lieser family, a family of Viennese industrialists. According to the auction house, the woman portrayed in the painting would not be Margarethe Constance Lieser, daughter of Silvia Lieser, as was thought until recently, but Helene, her cousin and daughter of Justus and Henriette Lieser. The reason would be that the painting was not commissioned by Silvia, but by her sister-in-law Henriette, known as "Lilly".

Tobias G. Natter, a Klimt expert, believes that it can instead be demonstrated that Fräulein Lieser is Margarethe. According to Natter, there are some

essential and independent pieces of evidence that demonstrate the identity of the woman. One comes from the son of the most important Klimt collector in Vienna, Erich Lederer (also a collector of Klimt and Schiele), the other is the testimony of Margarethe's sister-in-law who was also called Margarethe and was the second wife of her brother Hans. They asked her twice, in 1984, who the woman portrayed was, and she always replied: Margarethe.

Erika Jakubovits, cultural director of the Jewish Community of Vienna, believes that the auction should be postponed until the portrait's origin and identity are definitively clarified.

The subject is thought to have made nine visits to Klimt's studio between April and May 1917.

The painting measures 140 cm × 80 cm (55 in × 31 in). The background of the painting has faintly pencilled shapes, suggesting that Klimt intended to continue making elaborations.

According to Dobai, the painting "recalls in its compositional approach and in particular in the position of the hands, the portraits of Adele Bloch-Bauer II and Elisabeth Bachofen-Echt ".

== Provenance ==
Klimt painted the Portrait of Fräulein Lieser in 1917. The piece was left unsigned in his studio when he died in 1918 and was given to the family.

Following a Klimt exhibition in Vienna's Neue Galerie in 1925, the painting passed into a private collection. The only record of the painting was a black-and-white photograph from around the time it was exhibited in 1925. It was thought to have belonged to either Adolf or Henriette Lieser.

After Austria merged with Nazi Germany in the Anschluss of 1938, the Lieser family was persecuted under the Nazi's anti-Jewish laws. Lieser's assets and homes were "aryanized". Henriette Lieser was deported to Riga on 11 January 1942 and was killed there on 3 December 1943.

The portrait was acquired around 1960 and eventually passed to an anonymous Austrian citizen. The portrait was "rediscovered" in 2024 after the owner approached the im Kinsky auction house. The itinerary of the painting between 1925 and 1960 is unknown.

The painting was scheduled to be sold by im Kinsky in April 2024 by the current owner. Margarethe Lieser's son, the financier Baron William de Gelsey, had no doubts that the girl portrayed by Klimt is his mother, also because she had often spoken to him about the painting, and spent his entire life searching for it. Strikingly, the painting only resurfaced a year after his death at 99, raising questions about whether its reappearance was deliberately timed. Gelsey died without heirs, and despite this, the painting was sold by the current owner with no direct legal successors from his lineage involved. The sale was conducted under the Washington Principles, as the painting’s ownership and history during the Nazi era remain unclear. On 24 April 2024, it was sold at auction in Vienna for €30 million.

In April 2025, the anonymous Hong Kong buyer has decided to withdraw the painting from the auction because doubts about its provenance have increased in the meantime. The legal representative of Hans, Margarethe's brother, claims that part of the proceeds from the sale should also go to him, regardless of the identity of the person depicted, since the commissioners of the painting were Margarethe's parents. Therefore, the agreements that had been made between the brothers Alois and Julius Lieser cannot be considered valid.

== Exhibits ==
Prior to the auction in 2024, the portrait was expected to be exhibited publicly in Germany, Hong Kong, Switzerland, and the United Kingdom.

== See also ==
- List of paintings by Gustav Klimt
- Washington Principles on Nazi-Confiscated Art
- The Holocaust in Austria
- Vugesta
