= HITIAG =

HITIAG (Hanf-Jute-und Textilindustrie-Aktiengesellschaft) was founded in 1869 by Paul Pacher von Theinburg as the first Austrian jute spinning and weaving mill in Vienna-Simmering. Five years later, a jute factory was acquired in Floridsdorf, followed by the establishment of a jute spinning and weaving mill in Budapest in 1882.

== History ==
=== Founding ===
The Jewish Viennese families Lieser and Duschnitz began building their hemp spinning mill and rope factory between 1880 and 1885. The main co-founders of the plant in Golling from the 1880s were the brothers Sigmund, Adold and Justus Lieser. In 1899, the company was integrated into the Bodencreditanstalt Group.

In the last year of the First World War, a paper factory in Neudeck, a jute factory in Trieste and stakes in a jute factory in Bielitz and a textile loom factory in Eger were acquired. This was followed in 1919 by a founding participation in the Pielachberger Hanfspinnerei und Bindfadenfabrik Ges.m.b.H. near Melk and the takeover of the first Austrian mechanical hemp spinning mill, twine and rope factory, Lieser & Duschnitz in Neuda.

At the beginning of the 1920s, the group was international, spanning six countries and employing 6,500. In 1922, the First Hungarian Jute Spinning and Weaving Mill in Neufeld an der Leitha was also acquired. In 1928, the workforce in Neufeld peaked at 1,988. With the acquisition of Lieser & Duschnitzhemp products were added to the product range alongside jute products. The Lieser and Duschnitz families, were given shares in the new large company. In order to reflect the new business areas in the name, the large company was renamed: The Erste österreichische Jute-Spinnerei und -Weberei now became the Hanf-, Jute- und Textilit Industrie AG, or "HITIAG" for short.

== Nazi Era ==
Austria's merger with Nazi Germany in the Anschluss of 1938 had an immediate negative impact on the company because HITIAG's founding families, Lieser and Duschnitz, were Jewish.They were persecuted under anti-Jewish laws and forced out of the company which was transferred in an "Aryanization" to non-Jewish owners. They were forced to flee Austria to survive.

== Postwar ==
=== Reduction after 1951 ===
In 1959, the Vienna plants were shut down and the machines were transported to Neufeld and Neuda.

In 1971/72, the jute spinning and weaving mill in Neufeld was shut down and a factory for finishing textile yarn was set up with the remaining machines and a German partner from the textile finishing company Schroers (since 2007 TAG Composites & Carpets GmbH); HITIAG held 50 percent of the successor company AUTEXA.Parts of the former HITIAG factory buildings had already been used as a production site by Myrtle Mill, now Österreichische Kuvertindustrie Ges.m.b.H., since 1972; in 1989 this production was relocated to Hirm.

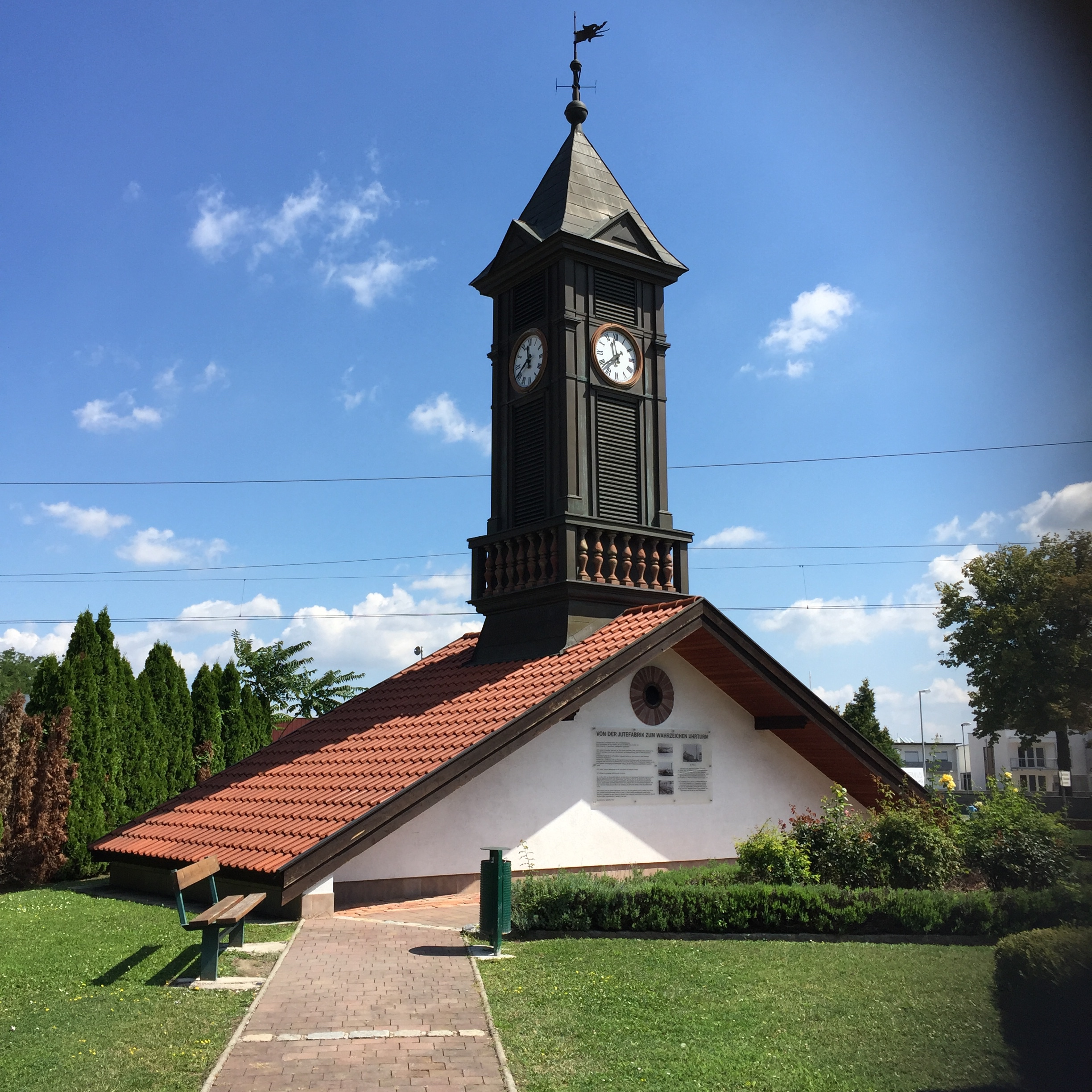
HITIAG clock tower monument in Neufeld an der Leitha

On July 31, 1985, the existence of the HITIAG company in Neufeld ended with the bankruptcy of the AUTEXA company. In 1996, the demolition of the former factory halls began and in September 1997 a monument was erected from the clock tower of the former HITIAG.

In 1995, Lambacher Hitiag AG's turnover fell by half to ATS 266.45 million. At this time, the company consisted only of Lambacher Hitiag AG as the parent company of August Kohl & Wäntig Seilerwaren-Handels-GesmbH (Vienna) and Karolina Kft.).

=== Relocations after 2001 ===
In 2001, the plant in Neuda was closed and wet yarn production was transferred to the Tolna plant, followed by the closure of production in Stadl-Paura, where only the headquarters of Lambacher Hitiag Leinen AG remained.

The current company name is LHL Immobilien Beteiligungs-GmbH

== Literature ==
- Manfred Zwirner: Handwerkliche und industrielle Textilspinnerei im Bezirk Melk.

== See also ==
- Henriette Lieser
- The Holocaust in Austria
- Creditanstalt-Bankverein
