= Gutmann =

Gutmann may refer to:

- Gutmann (surname), including a list of people with the name
- Bank Gutmann, a private bank in Vienna, Austria
- Gutmann method, an algorithm used to erase the contents of a computer drive, invented by Peter Gutmann
- Palais Gutmann, a Ringstraßenpalais in Vienna

== See also ==
- Gutman
- Guttmann
- Guttman
