= Hiwi al-Balkhi =

9th-century Jewish or Christian exegete and Bible critic

Ḥiwi al-Balkhi (9th century) (Hebrew: חיוי אל-בלכי, also Hiwwi or Chivi) was an exegete and Biblical critic of the last quarter of the ninth century born in Balkh, Khorasan (modern Afghanistan). It is not entirely clear whether Hiwi was a Jew, as suggested by Schechter (1901), or whether he was perhaps a member of a gnostic Christian sect (Rosenthal 1948). Some claim that he was a member of the ancient Bukharan Jewish community of Central Asia.

== Criticism of the Bible ==
Ḥiwi was the author of a work in which he offered two hundred objections to the divine origin of the Hebrew Bible. Ḥiwi's critical views were widely read, and it is said that his contemporary Saadia Gaon found in Babylonia, in the district of Sura, some schoolmasters who used elementary textbooks which were based upon Ḥiwi's criticisms to teach children. Saadia not only prohibited the use of these books, but combated Ḥiwi's arguments in a work entitled Kitab al-Rudd ala Ḥiwi al-Balkhi. Both Saadia's and Ḥiwi's books are lost.

Ḥiwi's book appears to be one of the most significant contributions to skeptical Jewish literature. Only a few of his objections are preserved, in quotations by other authors. In this way, it became known that Ḥiwi raised the question why God preferred to live among unclean mankind instead of living among the clean angels (Judah ben Barzillai), and why He required sacrifices and showbread if He did not eat them, and candles when He did not need light. Another objection of his was based on the claim that God broke a promise which He had made under oath. All these objections are preserved in Saadia's The Book of Beliefs and Opinions, among twelve other objections of a similar kind, most of which are supposed to have originated with Ḥiwi. They point out several discrepancies in the Scriptures and infer therefrom a non-divine authorship. Ḥiwi even objected to the teaching of the unity of God, and referred to Deuteronomy xxxii. 9. In this case, as in several others, Saadia combats Ḥiwi without mentioning his name.

Some others of Ḥiwi's views are preserved in Abraham ibn Ezra's commentary on the Torah. Ḥiwi explained the passing of the Israelites through the Red Sea by the natural phenomenon of the ebb-tide and the phrase in Exodus 34:29, "[Moses] was not aware that the skin of his face was radiant" (Biblical Hebrew: לֹֽא־יָדַ֗ע כִּ֥י קָרַ֛ן ע֥וֹר פָּנָ֖יו, romanized: lo-yāḏaʿ ki qāran ʿor pānāw), he explained as referring to the dryness of his skin as a consequence of long fasting (see ibn Ezra on the passage in Exodus). Ḥiwi further explained manna as a naturally occurring phenomenon (Ibn Ezra to Exodus 16:13).

These few instances of Ḥiwi's criticisms are sufficient to show his skeptical and irreverent spirit, the cause of which David Kaufmann traced back to anti-Jewish polemical Middle Persian literature. Rosenthal (1948) also indicates that all of these Biblical difficulties can be traced to Manichaean dualist views. Both Karaite and Rabbanite Jews denounced Ḥiwi as a heretic. His real surname, "al-Balkhi," is correctly preserved in one instance only; in all others it is changed into "al-Kalbi" (Judeo-Arabic: אל-כלבי, romanized: al-kalbi, lit. 'the dog-like').

== The geniza fragment ==
In Jewish Quarterly Review (1901) xiii. 358 et seq. Schechter has published one of the most interesting genizah fragments, containing a long series of critical remarks on the Bible which, as Schechter demonstrates, recall very vividly Ḥiwi's method of argumentation. Continuing his essay, Schechter gives also the reasons which speak against the presumption that Ḥiwi was the author of the fragments; he comes to the conclusion, however, that they at least emanated from the school of Ḥiwi. Below are some of Schechter's remarks (footnotes omitted). The Bibliography at the bottom of this page provides a link to the full source.

At the first glance we are inclined to take our fragment as the remainder of a polemical work containing an attack on Rabbinic Judaism directed by some Karaitic writer. This is especially the impression we gain from the contents of p.10 where allusion is made to Zech. v. 6 and 11, which verses (among others in the same chapters) the Karaites were particularly fond of applying to the two great Rabbanite schools in Sura and Pumbeditha. This impression, however, entirely passes away when we have gone through tho whole of the MS (manuscript) and found that not a single stricture is made on any particular Rabbinic teaching or traditional law. Its attacks—and they are many and vigorous as we shall see presently—are directed againut the Scriptures, not their interpretation. We must, therefore, look out for some person or sect who not only rejected tradition but also maintained a skeptical attitude towards the Bible itself. This brings us naturally to Chivi Albalki, who, rightly described by Graetz, was the first Bible-critic, and who was followed by a large section of his community which perpetuated his teaching for some three generations or more.

Before attempting, however, an identification, it will be advisable to give some summary of the nature of our author's arguments. As it would seem his Scripture difficulties were suggested by the following considerations: (1) That the style of the Scriptures is lacking in clearness, being constantly in need of explanation, which is not always forthcoming. (2) That they are wanting in consistency of phraseology and diction. (3) That they contain needless details and repetitions. These are of course more or less mere linguistic or philological difficulties; but the medieval Jews apparently considered such obscurities and inconsistencies in the diction and in the spelling as incompatible with the divine nature of a book, which is expected to be clear, concise, and free from ambiguities. Of a more serious nature are the considerations: (4) That they are full of chronological difficulties. (5) That the various books constituting the Scriptures are either directly contradictory to each other or ignore laws and ceremonies in the one portion which are considered as of the greatest import in the other. (6) That their ethics are inferior and in no way compatible with the moral nature of God. Regarding the chronological difficulties they have, without exception, been often enough discussed both by Rabbanite and Karaite authors who tried to solve them with more or less success. Our author, however, entirely ignores their existence, and his scoffing tone makes it probable that he regarded all these attempts as mere apologetic trash. As for instance when he says, "He (God) appointed 400 years as a share for his children in the slavery of burden, and then he added thirty years to confuse the mind, wherefrom shall these years come which he fixed?" Or again, when he says, "Inquire slowly into the days of David, Samuel, and Eli, the letter of Jephthah, and the days of the Judges. How can they reach 480 (years) in detail without erring and leading astray?" Or again, when he challenges the student to explain to him "softly and without anger" the chronological riddle of Isa. vii. 8, regarding "the three score and five years in which Ephraim shall be broken." In a similar manner he ignores all the attempts towards reconciling contradictory passages in the Scriptures. These, as he endeavors to prove, extend not only to mere difference in numbers between the books of Kings and the Chronicles and Jeremiah, but touch also the more serious question of law. "How is it," he asks "that the arrangement of the forbidden degrees in marriage is different in Lev. xx to Lev. xviii, and that whilst this book (of Leviticus) records twelve forbidden degrees, the book of Deuteronomy in the Curses (xxvii) mentions only four?" Again, how came it about that "the Mighty One in his Torah" forbade the eating of "things torn by beasts or that died by itself, and yet commanded the ravens to feed Elijah (with meat)?" He also wonders how Ezra could insist on the putting away of the strange women after the Torah in such a case only demands the bringing of a trespass-offering? "Those of the congregation who joined in affinity with an Egyptian people hastened to put away all the wives and such as were born of them according to the counsel of my God. But where have they been commanded such laws in the Torah of the Lord?" Very interesting is his remark regarding the prohibitive law of eating fat pieces (חלב) and the affirmative law relating to the blowing of trumpets on the first day of the seventh month, and the keeping of the day of Atonement which "the prophet of the Lord" did not mention in the Book of Deuteronomy.

Even more searching are the moral objections forming Class 6. Thus he asks, "He who liveth forever promised the Patriarch 'So shall thy seed be,' etc., and he believed in his word, and how could he then answer wrathfully that 'thy seed shall be a stranger in the land of their oppressor'?" Again he conceives the story of Balaam as described in the Pentateuch as attributing to God a sort of double-dealing with the heathen prophet, as well as attempting to protect Israel against himself. In another passage he alludes to the verse in Leviticus (xxvi. 18), "I will punish you seven times more for your sins," and to the one in Isaiah (xi. 2), that "She hath received of the Lord's hand double for all her sins," and exclaims, "Where are thy mercies of yore, 0 Lord God, merciful and gracious?" In a similar way he cites the verse from Ezekiel in which God first said to the prophet, "Behold I take away from thee the desire of thy eyes" (Ezek. xxiv. 16). The wife of the prophet died in the evening, whereupon the prophet is told "Thus Ezekiel is unto you a sign" (xxiv. 24); and our author asks sneeringly, "If God wanted to show miracle upon miracle could he not (accomplish this) without snatching away his poor wife through sudden death?" He then proceeds, "A wondrous thing like this he twice commanded Hosea: 'Go! take unto thee a wife of whoredoms' (Hos. i. 2 and iii. 1). But are such horrible things proper for the prophet?" He also protests against God's dealings with the houses of Baasha and Jehu, who are supposed to have provoked punishment from Heaven, the latter for his shedding the blood of Jezreel (Hos. i. 4) and the former for his having exterminated the house of Jeroboam (I Ki. xvi. 7), whilst according to other prophecies they were in so doing only fulfilling a commandment of God (I Ki. xvi. 14, and 2 Ki. x. 30). Farther on he says, "Industriously did he persuade David, 'Go number Israel and Judah,'" and then he threatened him with one of the three things—among them pestilence (2 Sam. xxiv. 1, 13, and 14), but if David sinned what wrong have the people committed? This objection is followed by another where he asks, "'the sons of Eli were sons of Belial and knew not God' (I Sam. ii. 12); they sinned and died, but why fell there of Israel 30,000 men?" (ibid. iv. 10), and he concluded the question by saying, "But ever so many (instances) like this I could proclaim."

== Bibliography ==
The JE cites the following sources:

  - Steinschneider, Jewish Literature, p. 119;
  - Julius Fürst, in Orient, Lit. x. 94;
  - Heinrich Grätz, Gesch. v. 261 et seq., 464 et seq.;
  - Guttmann, in Monatsschrift, xxviii. 260, 289;
  - A. Harkavy, Meassef Niddaḥim, i., No. 1;
  - idem, Sefer ha-Galui, pp. 146 et seq., 176;
  - Israelsohn, in R. E. J. xvii. 310;
  - D. Kaufmann, ib. xxii. 287;
  - Joseph Derenbourg, ib. xxv. 249;
  - Winter and Wünsche, Die Jüdische Litteratur, ii. 242 et seq.;
  - Bacher, Bibelexegese der Jüdischen Religionsphilosophen, p. 39.
- Schechter, S. (1901), "The oldest collection of Bible difficulties, by a Jew" (PDF), The Jewish Quarterly Review, XIII: 345–374, doi:10.2307/1450539, JSTOR 1450539.
- Rosenthal, Judah (1948), "HIWI AL-BALKKI: A comparative study", The Jewish Quarterly Review, 39 (1): 79–94, doi:10.2307/1453089, JSTOR 1453089.
