= William de Gelsey =

Hungarian-British economist (1921–2021)

Baron William de Gelsey KCSG
- Born: 17 December 1921; Vienna
- Died: 26 February 2021 (aged 99); London
- Citizenship: British

Baron William de Gelsey's family coat of arms granted in 1904

Baron William de Gelsey of Gelse and Beliscse (17 December 1921, Vienna – 26 February 2021, London), internationally known as William de Gelsey, was a British banker and economist of Hungarian origin. He was chief adviser of the Board of Directors of UniCredit CAIB Securities and chairman of the board of directors at the pharmaceutical company Richter Gedeon Nyrt.

== Early life and education ==
De Gelsey was the son of Dr. Henrik de Gelsey (1890–†?), lawyer and landowner, and Marguerite Lieser, a scion of the Gutmann family of Gelse and Beliscse. His mother was Austrian. His father's family lost their Croatian estates after the First World War. His paternal great-grandfather, Henrik Gutmann (1805–1890) of Gelse, was the president of the Nagykanizsa Savings Bank, founder and president of the Nagykanizsa Trade and Industry Bank shareholders' association, a citizen of Nagykanizsa, who was granted nobility and the noble predicate of Gelse from King Franz Joseph I of Hungary on 26 December 1869; his paternal great-grandmother was Nanette Strasser (1819–1878). His paternal grandfather, Baron Vilmos Gutmann of Gelse and Beliscse (1847–1921), a resident of Nagykanizsa, was appointed a royal councillor on 25 February 1882 and was subsequently granted the rank of Baron as well as the predicate of Beliscse on 16 September 1904. In 1895, the Vilmos Gutmann of Gelse established the 'Vilmos Gutmann of Gelse Scholarship Foundation', which was intended for untiring students of exemplary conduct at the main grammar school of Nagykanizsa. Baron William de Gelsey's paternal grandmother, was the noble Krausz Rozália of Megyer (1854–1932). His maternal great-grandfather, Krausz Mayer (1809–1894), was a landowner and distiller, who had been granted nobility and the noble predicate of megyeri by the King on 3 September 1882. Baron William de Gelsey's aunt was Baroness Lilly Amália Gutmann of Gelse and Beliscse (1882–1954), whose husband, Baron Iván Skerlecz of Lomnica (1873–1951), was the Ban of Croatia-Slavonia.

After studying at the Royal Catholic University High School in Budapest, he followed in his father's footsteps to obtain an MA in Natural Sciences from Trinity College, Cambridge.

== Career ==
In his time at Cambridge, de Gelsey wanted to be a chemist. After gaining experience at Imperial Chemical Industries (ICI), he turned to management consulting when it became apparent that as a Hungarian he had little chance of becoming head of the international division. In 1960 he turned to investment banking, first as managing director of Hill Samuel & Co. He later became managing director and then vice-chairman of Orion Royal Bank, a major international consortium (NatWest/Chase/WestLB/Royal Bank of Canada/Credito Italiano/Mitsubishi Tr). Gelsey's nickname at Orion was Wandervogel, 'world traveller'.

He visited Hungary only twice during the communism. In 1974, he represented Orion Royal Bank at the 50th anniversary of the founding of the Hungarian National Bank.

In 1988 he moved to Vienna, where he became an adviser to what is now UniCredit Bank (formerly Creditanstalt).

The Hungarian subsidiary of Creditanstalt acted as the advisor to the privatisation of Gedeon Richter after which, in 1995 Gelsey was elected as a member of the Richter board. Four years later, he became chairman of the board, a position he has held ever since 2011.

== Charitable works ==
Together with his brother Alexander de Gelsey, they played an instrumental role in returning the more than 300-year-old Royal University Catholic High School (which was closed in 1948) to its original building. It took three years of litigation to get the building back from the capital's municipality. The brothers set up the Catholic University High School Foundation, which contributed more than 100 million forints to the modernisation of the building. William de Gelsey personally secured the application for the 'EEA and Norwegian Financial Mechanisms' tender as well as co-financed 15% of the project (€150,000).

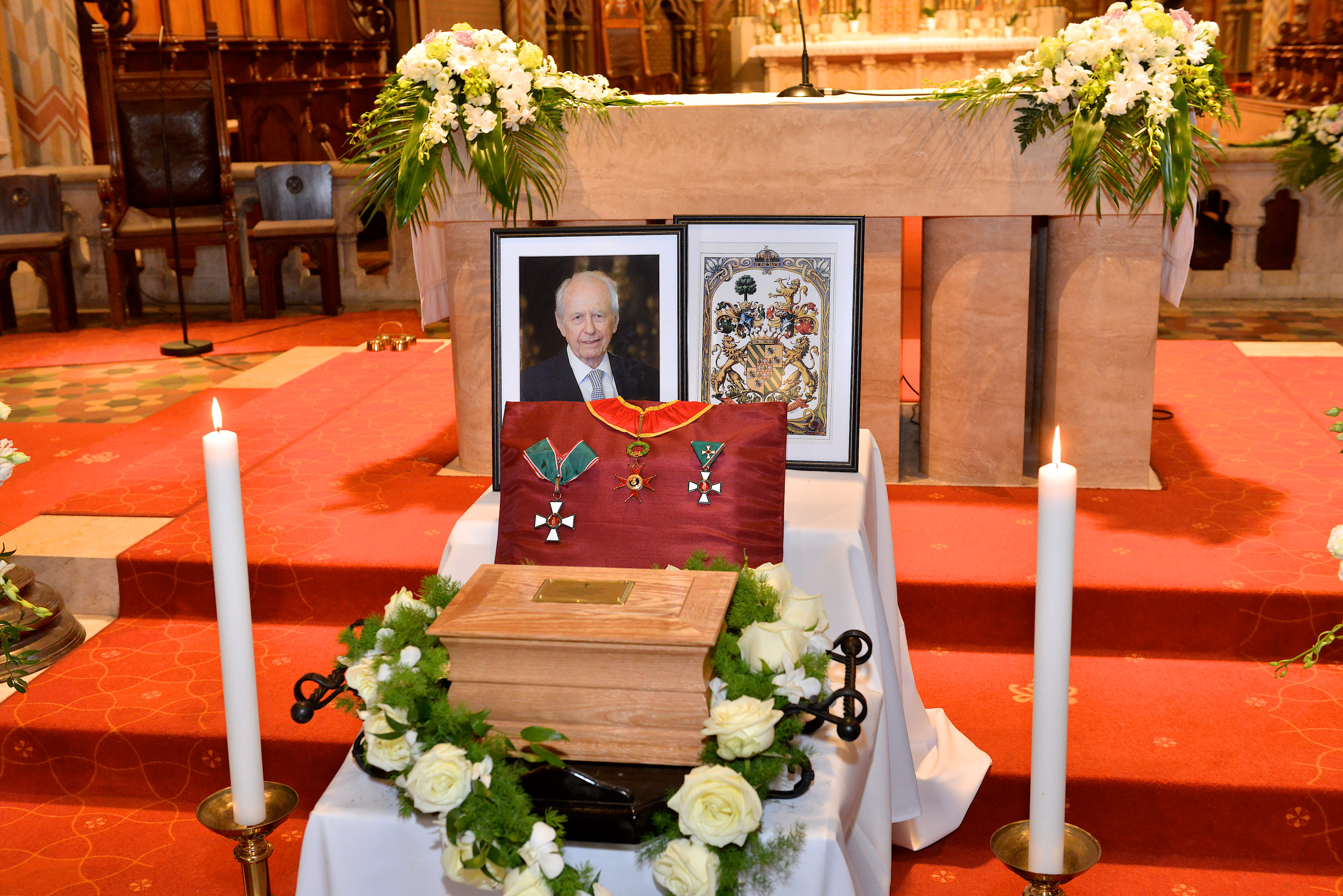
Memorial mass at the Matthias church - with family coat of arms and honours

== Honours and awards ==
Ribbon	Name	Year	Notes
	Commander's Cross of the Order of Merit of the Republic of Hungary	2010	Awarded for the establishment of the Catholic University High School Foundation and in recognition of its multifaceted, supportive activities to raise the quality of Hungarian public education.
-	Hungarian Economy Award (Magyar Gazdaságért Díj)	2009	
	Knight Commander of the Order of St. Gregory the Great (KCSG)	2005	Awarded for services to the Hungarian Catholic Church.

== Arms ==
Coat of arms of William de Gelsey
Granted 1904 Coronet Hungarian Baron's coronet Helm Two crowned helmets; in dexter, for a crest a natural Oak tree. In sinister, for a crest a lion rampant or, lomgued gules, swinging a hatchet handled sable, blades silver in his dexter paw. Mantling in dexter vert doubled or, in sinister gules doubled or. Escutcheon Quarterly; 1 and 4 a bendy of 7 vert and or. In 2 and 3 or, two natural bees bendwise. An Inescutcheon a chequey of nine; 2, 4, 6, 8 gules a fleur de lis argent, in 1, 3, 5, 7, 9 or, an acorn proper. Supporters Two lions rampant or longued gules Compartment Bronze arabesque Motto Or on gules "Labore et Perseverantia" (Hard work and Persistence) Orders Knight Commander of the Order of St. Gregory the Great
