= Julius Guttmann =

German rabbi and theologian (1880–1950)

Julius Guttmann (born Yitzchak Guttmann, Hebrew: יוליוס גוטמן; 15 April 1880 in Hildesheim – 19 May 1950 in Jerusalem), was a German-born rabbi, Jewish theologian, and philosopher of religion.

== Biography ==
Julius was born to Jakob Guttmann (1845–1919) while Jakob served as Chief Rabbi at Hildesheim during the years 1874 to 1892, when Hildesheim still had a large Jewish population. Jakob himself published papers on a number of philosophical topics. The family moved to Breslau in 1880.

Julius received his basic training at the Breslau Rabbinical Seminary and the University of Breslau. He was lecturer at Breslau from 1910 to 1919, and Lecturer at the Hochschule for the Academic Study of Judaism (The Reform Seminary) in Berlin from 1919 to 1934. At that time, he became Professor of Jewish Philosophy at Hebrew University, a position which he held until his death.

== Works ==
Guttmann is best known for Die Philosophie des Judentums (Reinhardt, 1933), translations of which are available in Hebrew, Spanish, English, Japanese, etc. The English title is The Philosophy of Judaism: The History of Jewish Philosophy from Biblical Times to Franz Rosenzweig.

Roth (1999) sees in this publication "the last product in the direct line of the authentic Judaeo-German 'Science of Judaism'," more commonly known as Wissenschaft des Judentums. While that movement did not utterly expire with the publication of Guttman's work—its spirit living on in the work of G. Scholem and H.A. Wolfson among many others—it is certainly the case that the Wissenschaft movement in Germany had by the 1930s already ceased to thrive.

The original German edition of Philosophie des Judentums ends with Hermann Cohen, the primary influence on Guttman's own philosophy, while the later Hebrew edition includes Franz Rosenzweig. It is also notable that Guttman's work excludes major thinkers of the Kabbalistic school, which reflects his own attitude toward Jewish philosophy (Werblowsky 1964).

=== Personalities Appearing in "Die Philosophie des Judentums" ===
- Chiwi al-Balkhi
- Saadia ben Joseph
- Isaac Israeli
- Solomon ibn Gabirol
- Bahya ibn Paquda
- Yehuda Halevy
- Abraham ibn Daud
- Moses Maimonides
- Levi ben Gerson
- Chasdai Crescas
- Moses Mendelssohn
- Spinoza
- Solomon Formstecher
- Samuel Hirsch
- Nachman Krochmal
- Salomon Ludwig Steinheim
- Moritz Lazarus
- Hermann Cohen
- Franz Rosenzweig

== See also ==
- Isaac Husik, whose English language history of medieval Jewish philosophy bears similarities to Guttmann's Philosophies of Judaism.
