= Viktor Gutmann =

Croatian industrialist

Baron Viktor Gutmann von Gelse und Belišće
- Born: 3 October 1891; Belišće, Austro-Hungarian Empire
- Died: 17 February 1946 (aged 54); Zagreb, PR Croatia, FPR Yugoslavia
- Cause of death: Execution by firing squad
- Education: Mechanical engineering
- Occupations: Businessman, engineer
- Spouse: Luise (née Bloch-Bauer)
- Children: Francis; Nelly of Auersperg
- Parent(s): Alfred Gutmann; Ottilie Gutmann (née Pollak von Rudin)
- Relatives: Edmund Gutmann (uncle); Ernest (brother); Otto (brother); Maria Altmann (sister in law)

Baron Viktor Gutmann von Gelse und Belišće (3 October 1891 – 17 February 1946) was a Croatian industrialist.

== Early life ==
Baron von Gutmann was born in Belišće on 3 October 1891 to a Croatian noble Jewish family named Gutmann. His father, Baron Alfred Gutmann von Gelse und Belišće (1857-1919), was the youngest son of Salamon Heinrich Gutman and brother of Baron Edmund von Gutmann. The entire Gutmann family was awarded with a hereditary peer Baron von Gelse und Belišće. His mother was Ottilie Pollak von Rudin (1864-1921).

Baron Gutmann was married to Luise Bloch-Bauer (1907-1998), who was the daughter of Marie Therese (née Bauer 1874–1961) and Gustav Bloch (1862–1938). Luise was also the sister of Maria Altmann and niece of Adele Bloch-Bauer, a wealthy member of Viennese society and a patron and close friend of Gustav Klimt.

== Great War and aftermath ==
He graduated as a mechanical engineer at the Vienna University of Technology. After graduation he served in the Austro-Hungarian Army on the Eastern Front during World War I. Baron Gutmann was awarded with Military Merit Medal and several other valor medals.

After the war he returned to Belišće to work at his family company "H.S. Gutmann". His grandfather Salamon established the wood-processing company "H.S. Gutmann" in Hungary. At first Gutmann worked under his cousin Artur Gutmann who was the oldest son of Edmund Gutmann. After his cousin's death, Baron Gutmann and his brother Ernest took over the company. Baron Gutmann and his brother expanded the company, built up and helped to develop Belišće. Gutmann and his family were very popular and beloved in Belišće as well as among company employees.

== During the Second World War ==
During World War II Baron Gutmann company was nationalised by the Independent State of Croatia regime. As Jews, Baron Gutmann, his wife and children were arrested and taken by Ustaše to prison at Savska street in 1943.

Baron Gutmann and his family managed to survive the Holocaust. After the war Baron Gutmann, as an idealist, returned to Belišće to assist in the reconstruction of Yugoslavia.

== Capture, trial, and death ==
On 17 November 1945 Baron Gutmann was arrested by the newly founded communist regime of SFR Yugoslavia as a "capitalist and aristocrat" under false charges of collaboration with the Nazis. After two days of trial at County Peoples Court in Zagreb, Baron Gutmann was sentenced to death on 23 November 1945. The verdict was confirmed by the Supreme Court of PR Croatia on 16 January 1946. He was executed by firing squad by the Communist regime in 1946 in Zagreb.

== Family ==
Baron Viktor Gutmann von Gelse and Beliscse and his wife Luise had 2 Children, 1Boy, 1Girl:

- Nelly Gutmman von Gelse and Beliscse (1928-2023) was born in Vienna. Nelly enrolled in medical school at the University of Zagreb in 1946, where she studied for three years till 1949. In 1950 Nelly moved to Vancouver, British Columbia, Canada where she married in 1955 to Prince Johananes Weikhardt von Auersperg (1930-2017), the son of Prince Eduard von Auersperg (1893-1948) and his wife, Countess Sophie von Clamm und Gallas (1900-1980). Johannes is a descendant of Prince Heinrich Joseph Johann von Auersperg and grand-grandnephew of two Minister-Presidents of Austria, Prince Karl of Auersperg and Prince Adolf of Auersperg. After completing a PhD in cell biology at the University of British Columbia, Nelly assumed a position there as associate professor in 1968.
- Franz Gutmann von Gelse and Beliscse (1934-2014); had issue

== Legacy ==
In June 2016 the Council of the County Court in Zagreb accepted request for review of Gutmann's trial and quashed the verdict from 1946 thus rendering him innocent of all charges. The review of the trial was requested by Nelly, Baron Gutmann's daughter.
