= Outsider in the White House =

Book by Bernie Sanders

- First edition (1997)
- Authors: Huck Gutman, Bernie Sanders, John Nichols
- Original title: Outsider in the House
- Language: English
- Subject: Bernie Sanders, Politics of the United States
- Genre: non-fiction
- Publisher: Verso Books
- Publication date: 1997; 2015
- Publication place: United States of America
- Pages: 346
- ISBN: 978-1-78478-418-8 (Paperback)
- OCLC: 918986570
- Preceded by: Outsider in the House
- Followed by: The Speech: A Historic Filibuster on Corporate Greed and the Decline of Our Middle Class

Outsider in the White House is a 2015 political memoir co-authored by Huck Gutman and presidential candidate Bernie Sanders, with an afterword by journalist John Nichols. It was first published as Outsider in the House in 1997.

== Content ==
A review in the British magazine Prospect finds Outsider surprisingly au courant for a reprint of a 20-year-old book, asserting that once readers get past the focus on Newt Gingrich era politics, the issues Sanders was addressing in the 90s: the negative impact of free trade on American wages, income inequality, falling working class wages, military overspending, poverty, and the negative impact of big corporation, feel contemporary. In fact, to the British reviewer, Bernie Sanders sounds just like Jeremy Corbyn, unsurprising given that both men are lifelong democratic socialists.

The book talks about Sanders's support for the Second Amendment to the United States Constitution, which gives United States citizens the right to bear arms.

Additionally, the book talks about the Republican Revolution spearheaded by Newt Gingrich. Sanders adds that the Republican Revolution works hand in hand with the Christian Coalition, whose main focus is on "immigrant and gay bashing". The 2015 reedition argues that the Republican Revolution remains relevant because "for Sanders, the only thing that’s changed over the past 20 years is that the bad guys have got worse".

== "N-word" controversy ==
In 2019, a passage from the 1997 book sparked controversy after The Daily Caller surfaced the passage of Sanders mentioning the n-word to critique racism. In addition, it has been reported that Sanders also mentioned the n-word in his 2015 version as well. The Sanders campaign later defended Sanders following the controversy.
