= Mississippi Teacher Corps =

University of Mississippi

The Mississippi Teacher Corps (MTC) is a two-year alternate route teaching program that recruits college graduates to teach in critical-need areas of Mississippi. As of May 2017, 569 participants have graduated from the program. Upon completion of the program, participants receive a Master of Arts degree in Curriculum and Instruction from the University of Mississippi.

Historically, most teachers were placed in the Mississippi Delta, though in recent years a growing number have been assigned to Marshall County, Jackson, Meridian, Aberdeen, North Panola, and other school districts outside the Mississippi Delta.

MTC is administered by the University of Mississippi and largely funded by the Mississippi Legislature.

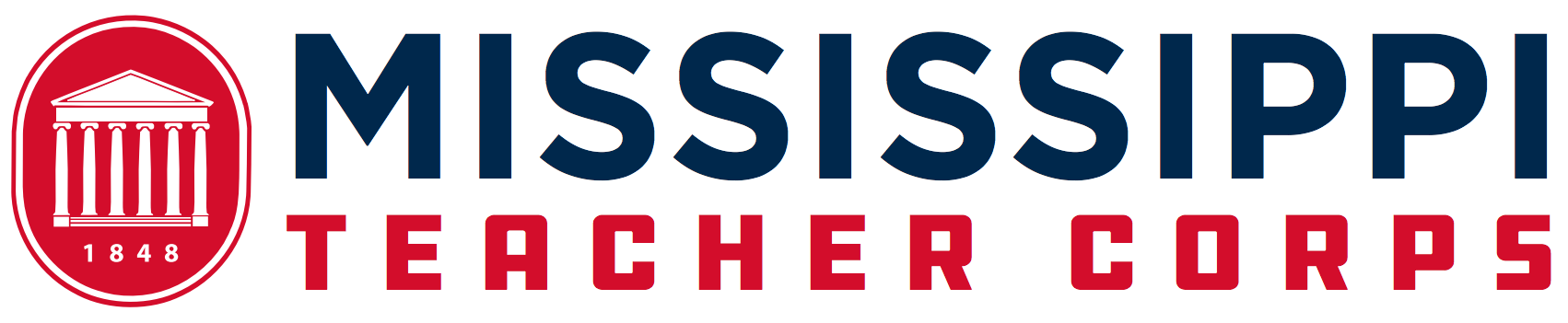

== History ==
MTC was founded by Amy Gutman and Andrew P. Mullins Jr. in 1989. Working with Dr. Mullins, then an employee for the State Department of Education, Gutman came up with the idea for the program, modeled after the Peace Corps. Gutman, a Harvard student doing a journalism internship in Greenwood, Mississippi, perceived that there were a lot of students who would be interested in coming to Mississippi to teach, provided they could get certified via the alternate route. Gutman and Mullins envisioned college graduates coming from all over the United States to teach in Mississippi in order to fill teacher shortages across the state, specifically in the Mississippi Delta.

In the program's first year, 1990, there was only a one-year teaching commitment. In 1993 the program relocated to the University of Mississippi and became a two-year program offering a Master of Arts degree in curriculum and instruction. The Mississippi Legislature fully funded the program in 1994.

== Participants ==
Each cohort class has 20 to 30 participants. About half are from Mississippi, and half from out of state. Of the participants graduating from 2012 to 2017, over a quarter remained in education in Mississippi. Over half of those graduates stayed in teaching somewhere in the US.

== Placement ==
Participants are placed in critical needs schools in mainly the northern half of Mississippi, so that they are able to easily travel to Oxford for their graduate classes at the University of Mississippi.

== Training methods ==
During the first two weeks of summer training, pre-service teachers meet other teachers in the program and begin their education coursework. Over the next 6 weeks, the new teachers begin to practice teaching: they are assigned to classrooms corresponding to their subject area to teach summer school classes at the MTC Extended-Year Summer Program at Holly Springs High School.

This summer school program, organized and supported by MTC alumni, serves students from Holly Springs, Marshall County, and neighboring districts. Former participants serve as administrators or head instructors, TEAM teachers, who mentor first-year teachers throughout the summer, model effective teaching strategies, provide constructive feedback and management advice, and support teachers through the various challenges within the teaching profession. During the first three weeks of summer training, the second year teachers in the program offer advice, model lessons, and mentor the new participants.

After the summer school day ends, first-year participants work on tasks with their TEAM teacher, attend graduate school class on teaching methodologies at The University of Mississippi, practice classroom management in role play scenarios, or attend a professional development workshop. Combined with the in-classroom teaching practice at summer school, these activities aim to provide new teachers with the skills they need to be successful at their respective schools in the fall.

== Benefits ==
Participants receive the following benefits as they make their way through the program:

· Guaranteed job placement with full salary and benefits in a Mississippi school district upon completion of the first summer training

· Intensive teacher training and a Class A teaching license

· Full scholarships for tuition and books toward a Master of Arts degree in Teaching (MAT)

· On campus housing and a $1000 living stipend during summer training

· Mentoring, support, and professional networking from program alumni

== Retention ==
MTC has recently begun to focus more intensely on retention of teachers in Mississippi. There are incentives for teachers who opt to stay beyond their initial two-year commitment. A $1000-$3000 per year bonus is available for some teachers who stay to teach in a Mississippi public school for a third year.
