= Gutmans =

Gutmans is a surname. Notable people with the surname include:

- Andi Gutmans, Swiss-born Israeli programmer and entrepreneur
- Ernests Gutmans (1901–?), Latvian boxer

== See also ==
- Gutman
- Gutmann (surname)
