= Gutmann Family =

Hungarian noble family

Coat of arms of Barons von Gutmann

The Baronial Gutmann family or Gutmann of Gelse and Beliscse (gelsei és beliscsei báró Gutmann) is a Hungarian noble family of Jewish origin, ennobled in the 19th century.

== History ==
Of this family, Henrik Gutmann from Nagykanizsa founded the family's business in 1836, trading timber and grain. He later became the president of the local Jewish community. In 1869, Henrik Gutmann was granted nobility together with the noble predicate of Gelse (gelsei). He had several sons, Ödön, László, Vilmos and Aladár Gutmann. Vilmos Gutmann (1847-1921), a resident of Nagykanizsa, was made a Royal Councillor on 25 February 1882 and was elevated to the rank of Baron on 16 September 1904, and was given an additional noble predicate of Beliscse (beliscsei). The fourth son, Vilmos, took the family business further, developing the Beliscse woodworking factory into a major enterprise, employing 3,000 people at the turn of the century, and in 1892 he also became one of the founders and main shareholders of the Nagykanizsa brewery. After Vilmos's death, his brother László liquidated the businesses in Nagykanizsa.

Vilmos' grandsons, Baron Alexander (Sándor), born in 1924, and his brother, Baron William (Vilmos), born in 1921, changed their surnames to "Gelsey".

== Arms ==
Coat of arms of Gutmann Family
Granted 1904 Coronet Hungarian Baron's coronet Helm Two crowned helmets; in dexter, for a crest a natural Oak tree. In sinister, for a crest a lion rampant or, lomgued gules, swinging a hatchet handled sable, blades silver in his dexter paw. Mantling in dexter vert doubled or, in sinister gules doubled or. Escutcheon Quarterly; 1 and 4 a bendy of 7 vert and or. In 2 and 3 or, two natural bees bendwise. An Inescutcheon a chequey of nine; 2, 4, 6, 8 gules a fleur de lis argent, in 1, 3, 5, 7, 9 or, an acorn proper. Supporters Two lions rampant or longued gules Compartment Bronze arabesque Motto Or on gules "Labore et Perseverantia" (Hard work and Persistence)

Coat of arms of Gutmann Family
Granted 1869 Helm Two crowned helmets; in dexter, for a crest a natural Oak tree. In sinister, for a crest a lion rampant or, lomgued gules, swinging a hatchet handled sable, blades silver in his dexter paw. Mantling in dexter vert doubled or, in sinister gules doubled or. Escutcheon A chequey of nine; 2, 4, 6, 8 gules a fleur de lis argent, in 1, 3, 5, 7, 9 or, an acorn proper. Motto Gules on or "Labore et Perseverantia" (Hard work and Persistence)

== Sources ==
- Gudenus János: A magyarországi főnemesség XX. századi genealógiája
- Zalai életrajzi kislexikon
