= Henriette Amalie Lieser =

1875 - 1943 patron of arts and Holocaust victim

Henriette Amalie Lieser (4 July 1875 in Vienna - 3 December 1943 in the Riga ghetto), known as Lilly Lieser, was a patron of the arts in Vienna who was murdered in the Holocaust.

== Life ==
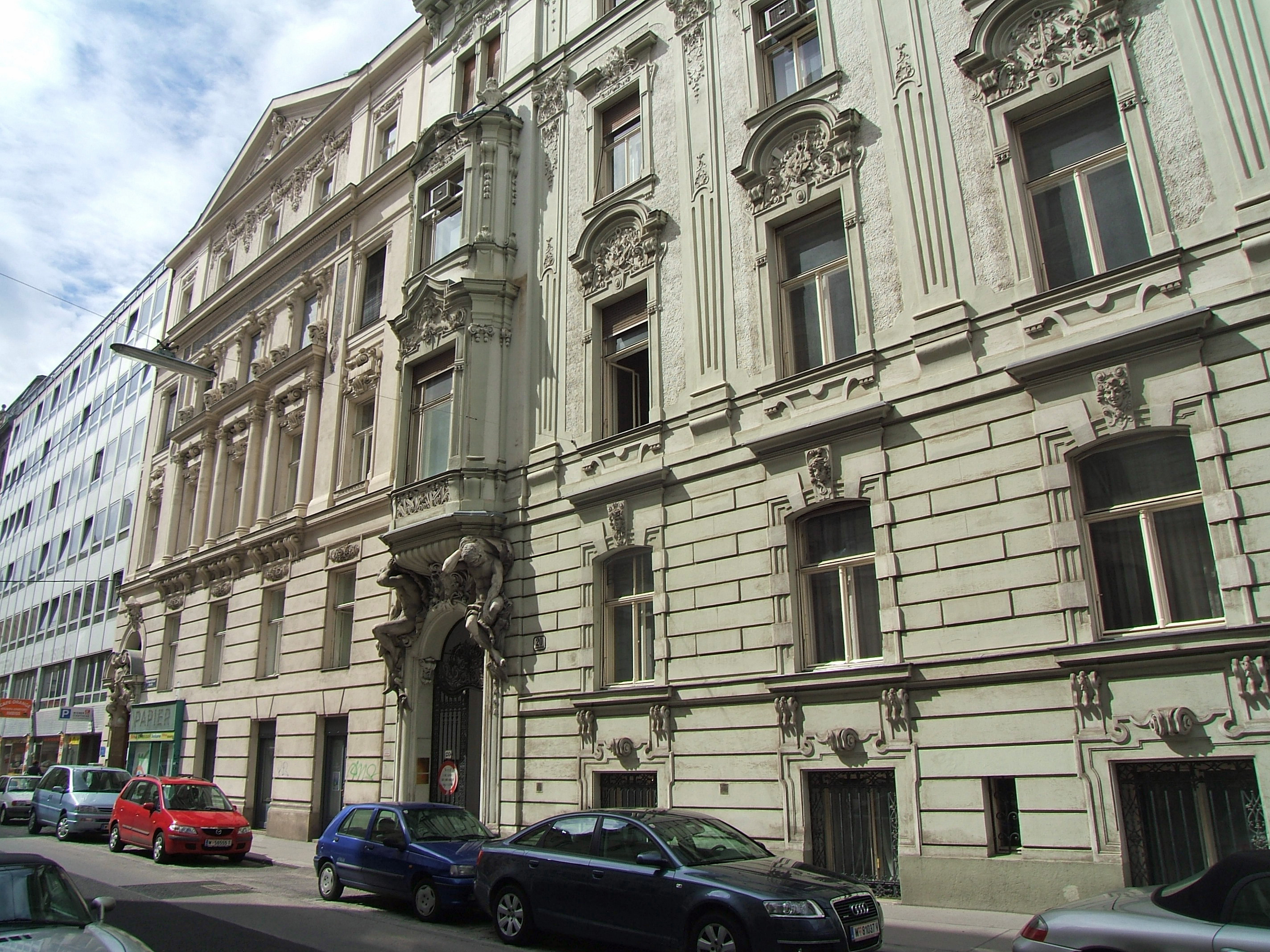
Palais LannaArgentinierstraße 20

Lilly Landau was the daughter of the wealthy couple Albert and Fanny Landau. In November 1896, she married the HITIAG entrepreneur and Imperial Councillor Justus Lieser, with whom she had two daughters, Helene (1898-1962) and Annie (1901-1972). The marriage ended in divorce in 1905. Helene was the first woman in Austria to receive a doctorate in political science in 1920. Annie was married to the Austrian Hans Sidonius Becker.

Between 1910 and 1915, Lilly Lieser was friends with Alma Mahler, their summer houses in Breitenstein were adjacent to each other. They traveled to Scheveningen together, and Lilly supported Alma during an abortion. Among other things, Lieser supported the composer Arnold Schönberg and let him live rent-free in her house in Vienna at Gloriettegasse 43 in Hietzing between 1915 and 1918; she herself still lived in a city palace at Argentinierstrasse 20a. Schönberg also received 500 crowns a month from her and a harmonium made in the USA.

In 1925, she was able to support Alban Berg financially with the printing of his opera Wozzeck, which Berg then dedicated to Alma Mahler.

== Expropriation and death in the Holocaust ==
After Austria merged with Nazi Germany in the Anschluss of 1938, the Lieser family was persecuted under the Nazi's anti-Jewish laws. Lieser's assets and homes were "aryanized". Their possessions included furniture, musical instruments and paintings by Maurice Utrillo, among others. Her daughters managed to flee to England and America. Lilly Lieser was deported to Riga on January 11, 1942 and died there on December 3, 1943. According to other reports, she was transported to the Auschwitz concentration camp and killed there.

== Legacy ==
In Joshua Sobol's simultaneous drama Alma - A Show Biz ans Ende, Henriette Amalie Lieser appears as Alma Mahler's friend Lilly Leiser (sic) and debates with her about her role in the printing of Alban Berg's "Wozzeck".

The unfinished Portrait of Miss Lieser (1917) by Gustav Klimt presumably shows either one of her daughters or her niece. In 1925, it was in Lilly Lieser's house at Argentinierstrasse 20 and was shown at an exhibition in Otto Kallir's Neue Galerie. The subsequent provenance including the Nazi years is unclear. The painting suddenty turned up in 2023 on sale at the Im Kinsky auction house. Kinsky announced that the current owners, who were unnamed, had concluded an agreement with the heirs of the Lieser family.

== Literature ==
- Irene Suchy: Lilly Lieser – eine Übersehene. Eine Co-Produzentin der Schönberg'schen Musikgeschichte. in: Österreichische Musikzeitschrift, 10/2008. Als PDF bei irenesuchy.org

== See also ==
- The Holocaust in Austria
- Aryanization
- Gustav Klimt
