= Gutt =

Gutt may refer to:

== People ==
- Abraham Gutt (born 1944), Israeli basketball player
- Camille Gutt (1884-1971), Belgian economist
- Fred E. Gutt (1919-2012), American World War II flying ace
- Golan Gutt (born 1994), Israeli basketball player
- Jeff Gutt (born 1976), American musician, lead vocalist for Stone Temple Pilots
- Romuald Gutt (1888-1974), Polish architect
- Simone Gutt (born 1956), Belgian mathematician

== Other ==
- Captain Gutt, a fictional Gigantopithecus from the animated film Ice Age: Continental Drift

== See also ==
- Gut (disambiguation)
