= Edmund Gutmann =

Baron Edmund Gutmann von Gelse und Belišće
- Edmund Gutmann (on the left seat) with his brothers Vilim, Isidor (both sitting), Ladislav and Alfred (both standing).
- Born: 3 March 1841; Nagykanizsa, Austrian Empire (now Hungary)
- Died: 17 January 1918 (aged 76); Belišće, Austro-Hungarian Empire (now Croatia)
- Citizenship: Hungarian
- Spouse: Albertine Gutmann
- Relatives: Viktor (nephew)

Baron Edmund Gutmann von Gelse und Belišće (3 March 1841 – 17 January 1918) was a Jewish Hungarian nobleman, industrialist and together with his family (father and brothers) founder of the settlement which became Belišće, Croatia.

== Biography ==
Baron Gutmann was born to a Jewish family of Salamon Heinrich and Nanette Gutmann, as oldest of nine children. He had four brothers and four sisters: Isidor (born 1845), Vilim (born 1846), Ladislav (born 1855), Alfred (born 1857), Hedwig, Emma (born 1848), Berta and Ida. His father established the wood-processing company "H.S. Gutmann" in Hungary. After the retirement of his father, Baron Gutmann and his brothers took over the company. Baron Gutmann bought in February 1884, on a ten-year lease, the complex of oak forests from Baron of Valpovo, Gustav Hillenprand Prandau. Soon after the first residential houses of Gutmann settlement – colony were built, fire department, post office, primary school building, the chapel at the cemetery were also built, together with electric grid and water supply with sewage. The "H.S. Gutmann" company created the first kilometers of forest industrial railway, which quickly grew into a local railway station with public transportation. Gutmann palace in Belišće center was built by Baron Gutmann for his son Arthur and daughter-in-law Stefania. Baron Gutmann was knighted by Franz Joseph I of Austria and awarded with a hereditary peer Baron von Gelse und Belišće.

== See also ==
- Belišće

== Bibliography ==
- Salajić, Milan (2012). Staro Belišće. Belišće.
