= Howard M. Guttman =

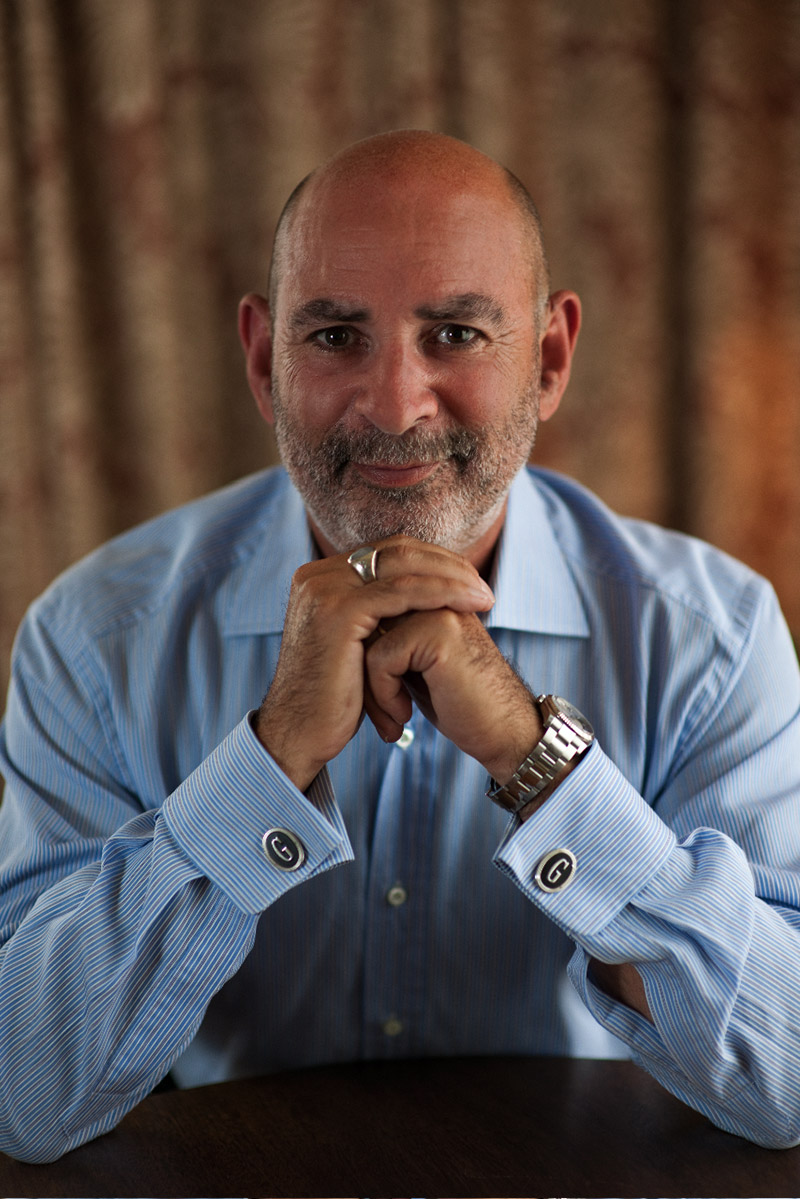
- Photo of Howard M. Guttman, by Jason Sheldon Photography

Howard M. Guttman is an American management consultant and founder of Guttman Development Strategies, a consulting firm. Guttman is best known for his theories on corporate organizational hierarchies, positing that the traditional, top-down model of management is less effective than the horizontal, high-performance organization, where decisions are made by cross-functional teams with equal authority.

Guttman's theories have garnered him a following in top-management circles, largely due to his books and work with leaders of multi-national corporations who have applied his ideas in day-to-day business operations. He also regularly addresses corporate and academic audiences.

== Career ==
After graduating from New Jersey's Fairleigh Dickinson University in 1972 with a degree in history and education, Howard M. Guttman joined the New Jersey Historical Society as an associate in education, responsible for developing programs on New Jersey history and culture for teachers and students. After three years, he decided to matriculate in the master's program at Case Western Reserve's Mandel School of Applied Social Sciences. He received his M.S., with a focus on organization and community development, and returned to the New Jersey Historical Society as assistant director, responsible for State planning and Federal grant development. During his tenure at the society, Guttman authored 35 articles on New Jersey history. He also consulted with various organizations in the greater-New Jersey metropolitan area on issues related to management and organization development.

Guttman's interest in organization development consulting led him to apply for a position at Automatic Data Processing (ADP). He joined the company as a management development specialist. At ADP, he deepened his knowledge of the fundamentals of organization development consulting. He was profoundly influenced by his mentor, Vice President of Human Resources Bernie Kessler, from whom he learned how an OD consultant can add significant value to an organization's bottom line. He was promoted to senior OD consultant before leaving the company.

In 1982, Guttman was hired as national manager of training and development for Johnson & Johnson's consumer products sector, where he continued to develop new organization development processes focusing on senior executive teams. When he left J&J in 1988, he had risen to the position of corporate director of human resources.

In 1989, Guttman founded Guttman Development Strategies (GDS), based on his concept of horizontal, high-performance organizations, which was strongly influenced by the work of Peter Drucker. He now runs GDS out of a Mt. Arlington, New Jersey, office.

GDS works with many senior executive teams, including that of Mars, Incorporated, which was the subject of a Time magazine article.

Guttman's work and ideas have led him to be named to Leadership Excellence magazine's list of "Excellence 100 Top Thought Leaders". Guttman's writing and opinions are sought after by well-known publications and in a variety of forums. In 2004, he was asked to sit for an interview as part of Harvard Business Publishing's "Results- Driven Manager" series. His article, "Are Your Global Team Members Miles Apart?" is included in Harvard Business Review's collection, "Managing Teams for High Performance". Guttman also frequently addresses corporate and academic audiences, such as the Conference Board and the American Management Association.

Guttman is the author of Great Business Teams: Cracking the Code for Standout Performance, named one of the top business books of 2008 by Soundview Executive Book Summaries. He is also the author of When Goliaths Clash: Managing Executive Conflict to Build a More Dynamic Organization, named by Soundview as one of the Top Business Books of 2003.

His third book, Coach Yourself to Win: 7 Steps to Breakthrough Performance on the Job and in Your Life, attempts to show individuals how they can apply Guttman's executive coaching process to their everyday lives.

== Basic ideas ==
Several core ideas run through Guttman's consulting and writings:

=== Horizontal, high-performance organizations ===
Howard Guttman argues that business organizations should abandon hierarchical models and move to what he terms the "horizontal, high-performance model". In this model, decisions are made by teams composed of personnel from different functions within the organization.

Guttman defines a high-performance team as a workgroup that has reached agreement in five key areas: strategy; operational goals; roles and responsibilities; protocols, or ground rules; and business relationships/interdependencies. In such groups, there should be no leader per se; rather "every member of every team is a leader", and each member holds the others accountable.

=== Executive coaching ===
Guttman's executive coaching theories revolve around attempting to challenge behavior, not thoughts. He believes that a key factor in behavior change is the reframing of perceptions, which he refers to as "going-in stories". These stories make up the inner narrative that people tell themselves about why they behave as they do. Guttman suggests that to break through the barriers that have been holding them back, executives and individuals need to become conscious of their negative "going-in stories" and replace them with positive ones.

=== Essential management skills ===
With its global reach and matrixed structure, the modern corporation is significantly different from that of the past. This new model, in which work is done primarily by cross-functional teams, requires a new set of skills, including influencing, active listening, and conflict management. In the horizontal organization that Guttman sees emerging, these skills, once thought to be at best peripheral, now are central to the achievement of superior individual, team, and organization performance.

=== Ideas in practice ===
A number of senior executives have offered written commentary on how they have put Guttman's ideas into practice in their organization. Guttman's quarterly e-newsletter, GDS Insights, includes interviews with senior executives who explain how they have applied the concepts and the results they have achieved. Among them: Brian McNamara, chief executive officer, GlaxoSmithKline; Bob Gamgort, chairman and chief executive officer, Keurig Dr Pepper; Todd Lachman, president and CEO, Sovos Brands; and Charlie Jacobs, chief executive officer Delaware North's Boston Holdings and alternate governor Boston Bruins.

Guttman Development Strategies' white paper, "Organization Development: Accelerating to High Performance Through Multi-Tier Alignments", includes three case studies, based on interviews with company leaders, which demonstrate the concepts in use in Mars, Inc.'s Latin American Division; Redken USA; and INTTRA, Inc.
