= Ronald D. Guttmann =

Ronald D. Guttmann FRCPC FCAHS

Professor of Medicine, McGill University

Personal details
- Born: 1936 (age 89–90) Minneapolis, Minnesota, United States

Ronald D. Guttmann (born 1936 in Minneapolis, Minnesota) received his post secondary school education at the University of Minnesota, receiving a B.A. Magna Cum Laude in 1958, and a B.S. and M.D. degree in 1961. He did his Medical Internship at the University of California San Francisco, military service in the USNR at the Tissue Bank , National Naval Medical Center, Bethesda, Medical Residency on the II & IV (Harvard) Medical Service at Boston City Hospital, and a Research & Clinical Fellowship at the Peter Bent Brigham Hospital(now Brigham & Women's Hospital) and Harvard Medical School. In 1969, he was appointed associate in medicine at the Peter Bent Brigham Hospital and instructor in medicine at Harvard Medical School, and permanently moved to Montreal, Canada in 1970 to become director of the transplantation service at the Royal Victoria Hospital and McGill University Clinic and associate professor of medicine, McGill University Faculty of Medicine. During his academic career he directed an active basic and clinical research laboratory program focused on transplantation immunobiology, immunogenetics, immunosuppression, and long term-complications of transplant patients. He also developed an interest in social and ethical issues of transplantation, organ shortage, and human rights abuses.

== Professional organizations ==
He has held numerous executive positions in professional organizations such as The (International) Transplantation Society , American Society of Transplant Physicians (renamed American Society of Transplantation), Canadian Transplantation Society , XVII World Congress of The Transplantation Society Inc. , is a Fellow of the Royal College of Physicians & Surgeons of Canada , is a Fellow of the Canadian Academy of Health Sciences , and is an Emeritus Member of the American Society for Clinical Investigation , and the Association of American Physicians

== Awards and honours ==
- Bethune Exchange Professor, Beijing Medical College (1982).
- Mary Jane Kugel Award, Juvenile Diabetes Foundation International (1986).
- The Medical Award, Kidney Foundation of Canada (1987).
- Roche-ASTP Distinguished Achievement Award of the American Society of Transplant Physicians (1996).
- Lifetime Achievement Award of the Institute of Kidney Diseases and Research Centre, Ahmedabad, India (1996).
- Lifetime Achievement Award of the Canadian Society of Transplantation (2001).
- Establishment of the “Dr. Ronald D. Guttmann Transplant Scholarship” at the Royal Victoria Hospital Foundation (2001).

== Leadership & founder affiliations ==
- Director of the first multidisciplinary transplant service in Canada at the Royal Victoria Hospital & McGill University Clinic (1970).
- Co-founder and first president of the American Society of Transplant Physicians (now called American Society of Transplantation. (1982).
- Co-founder and president of the Canadian Transplantation Society (1979, 1985).
- Founder and former director of the McGill University Centre for Clinical Immunobiology and Transplantation (1988).
- Co-founder of the International Forum for Transplant Ethics (IFTE) (1993).
- Founder and president of the Institute of Policy Research in Medicine and Emerging-technologies (IPRIME) (1998).
- Co-founder, BioMosaics Inc. (1999).

== Retirement ==
Currently he is emeritus professor of medicine, McGill University, Montreal; executive vice-president, clinical and international development, BioMosaics Inc.; and an active biomedical and biotechnology industry consultant. Guttmann is an author of more than 310 original publications.
