= Huck Gutman =

American academic (born 1943)

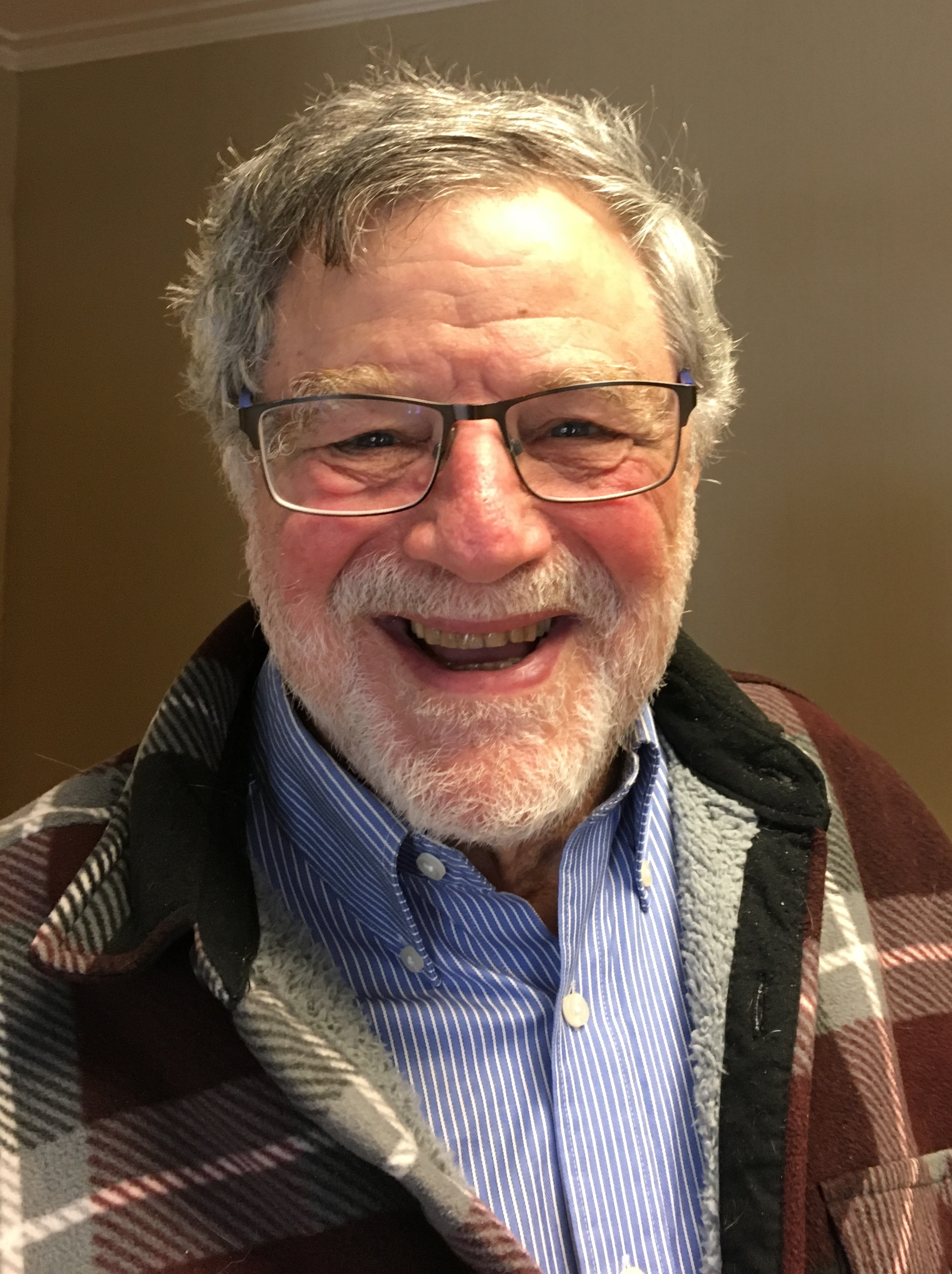
- Gutman in 2019
- Born: Stanley Gutman; December 24, 1943 (age 82)
- Education: University of Vermont; Duke University
- Occupations: Academic, political advisor and writer
- Spouse: Bertha Gutman

Stanley "Huck" Gutman (born December 24, 1943) is an American academic and political advisor. He is a professor of English at the University of Vermont and a former chief of staff to presidential candidate Bernie Sanders. He is the co-author of Sanders's political memoir, Outsider in the White House.

== Early life ==
Stanley Gutman was born on December 24, 1943. He graduated from the University of Vermont. While he was in college, he got the nickname "Huck" from Huckleberry Finn for walking barefoot around the campus. He received a PhD from Duke University.

== Career ==
Gutman is a professor of English at the University of Vermont. He is an expert on "20th-century American, 19th-century U.S. Poetry, Modern Poetry." He is the co-editor of a book about Michel Foucault as well as a collection of essays about the global critical reception of American literature. He has also written articles for the Monthly Review, two of which he co-authored with Harry Magdoff. He has written about Yehuda Amichai, an Israeli poet.

Gutman was chief of staff to presidential candidate Bernie Sanders in the United States Senate until 2012. He co-authored Outsider in the House, Sanders's political memoir, which was republished as Outsider in the White House in 2015.

== Personal life ==
Gutman lives with his wife, Bertha and their children in Burlington, Vermont.

== Works ==
- Foucault, Michel; Martin, Luther H.; Gutman, Huck; Hutton, Patrick H. (1988). Technologies of the Self: A Seminar with Michel Foucault. Amherst, Massachusetts: University of Massachusetts Press. ISBN 9780870235924. OCLC 15550013.
- Gutman, Huck (1991). As Others Read Us: International Perspectives on American Literature. Amherst, Massachusetts: University of Massachusetts Press. ISBN 9780870236297. OCLC 22347513.
- Gutman, Huck; Sanders, Bernie (2015). Outsider in the White House. Brooklyn, New York: Verso. ISBN 9781784784188. OCLC 918986570.
