= Laura Gutman =

Argentine psychotherapist

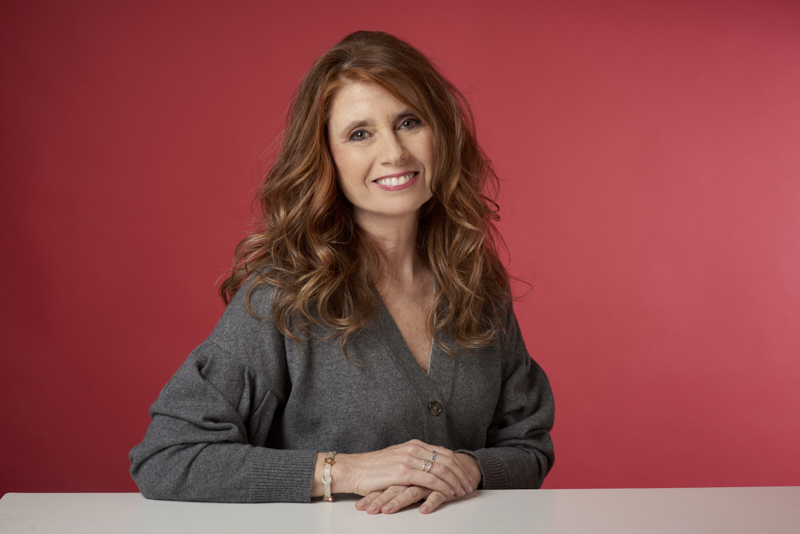
- Laura Gutman
- Born: 1958 (age 67–68); Buenos Aires, Argentina
- Education: Paris 8 University
- Occupation: Psychotherapist
- Known for: Human Biography Building

Laura Gutman, born in 1958 in Buenos Aires, Argentina, is a therapist specializing in maternity psychology.

== Biography ==
During the last military dictatorship in Argentina, she was exiled in Paris. There she studied Learning sciences at Paris 8 University. She enrolled feminist and naturopathy movements. She was disciple of Françoise Dolto and Michel Odent. In 1988 she moved back to Buenos Aires. She started counseling young mothers on parenting. She founded the School of Parenting in Buenos Aires. Later on, she started to write books on the psychology of maternity. She has developed a new method of Psychotherapy called Human Biography Building.

== Books in English ==
- Gutman, L. (2002). Maternity: Coming face to face with your own shadow
