= Elizabeth Gutman Kaye =

American artist, singer, composer and teacher (1887–1971)

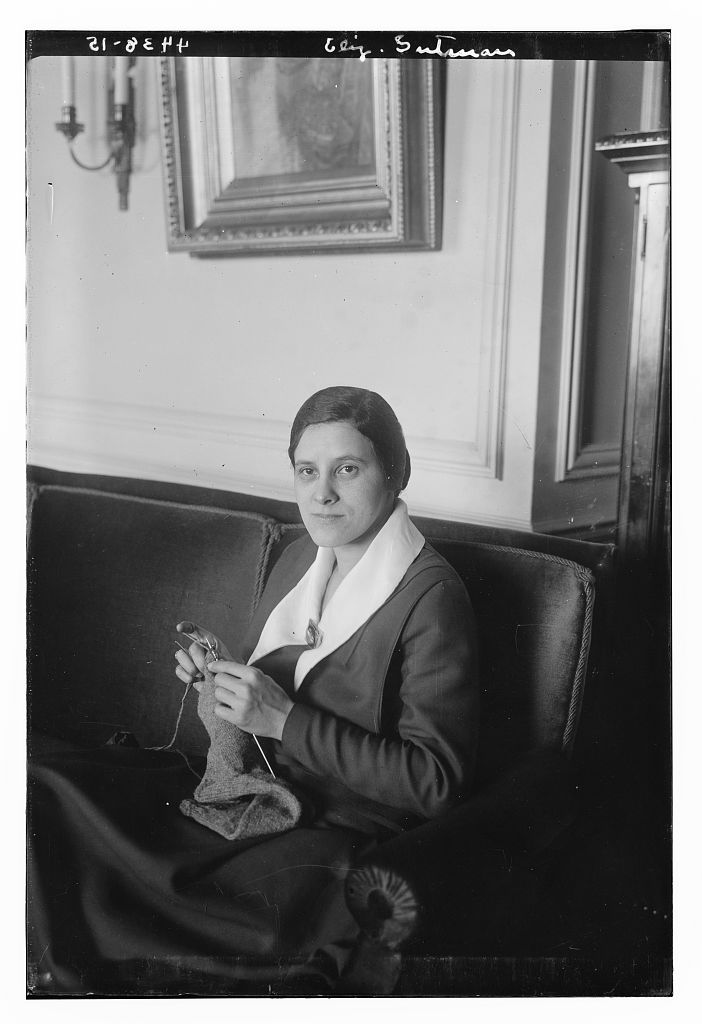
- Gutman in the 1910s, with knitting
- Born: September 5, 1887; Baltimore, Maryland, U.S.
- Died: April 15, 1971 (aged 83); Jamaica
- Other name: E. G. Katzenstein
- Education: Goucher College
- Occupations: Artist; singer; composer; music teacher
- Spouse: Walter Kaye (m. 1911; died 1945)
- Relatives: Adele Gutman Nathan (sister)
- Musical career
- Genre: Folk music
- Instrument: Voice

Elizabeth Gutman Kaye (September 5, 1887 (Note: Also cited as 1891.) – April 15, 1971), also known as E. G. Katzenstein, was an American artist, soprano singer, composer and music teacher. In her musical career she was best known for performing Russian and Yiddish folk songs.

== Early life and education ==
Gutman was born in Baltimore, the daughter of Louis K. Gutman and Ida Newburger Gutman. Her father was a department store executive. Her mother was founder and president of the Baltimore Music Club and active in the National Federation of Music Clubs. Her sister was theatrical director and writer Adele Gutman Nathan (1889–1986). She attended Goucher College.

== Career ==
Kaye found success as a soprano, specializing in Brazilian, Spanish, Russian and Yiddish folk songs. She toured in the United States and gave recitals in New York City, Washington, D.C., Paris, Vienna and Rome. She was featured at a lecture by writer Ilya Tolstoy in 1917, along with pianist Leo Ornstein and the Ukrainian National Theater of New York. She was a soloist with the Baltimore Symphony Orchestra. She also gave costumed performances for children, taught voice students, lectured on folk music, and wrote songs.

Kaye did not have a strong voice, but she researched her genre and conveyed "the spirit and content" of the songs effectively. "If I did not think I had something to say that was worth making people hear and see, I should never try to sing," she told the Musical Courier in 1918. Dixie Selden made a portrait of Gutman before 1930.

Kaye was also a talented watercolorist, and her works were exhibited in Europe and the United States. She sometimes used the name E. G. Katzenstein for her art.

== Compositions ==
- "At Night" (1948, words by Juanita D. Miller)
- "Child and Moon" (1954, words and music)
- "Was it a Dream?" (1954, words and music)

== Personal life ==
Gutman married department store executive Walter Kaye in 1911. She reported a jewelry theft from her Baltimore apartment in 1926. After her husband died in 1945, she lived in New York City and in Italy. She died while vacationing in Jamaica in 1971, at the age of 83.
