= Adele Gutman Nathan =

American writer

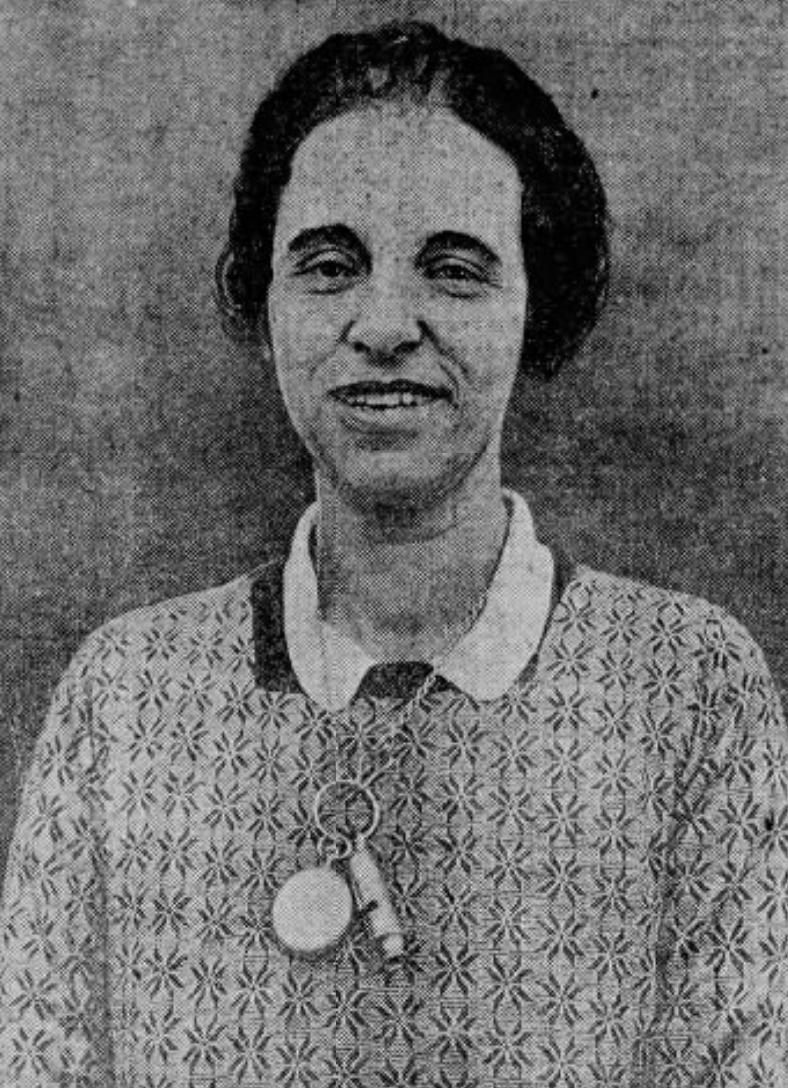
- Nathan, from a 1927 newspaper
- Born: September 15, 1889; Baltimore, Maryland, U.S.
- Died: July 24, 1986 (age 96); New York, New York, U.S.
- Occupations: Writer, director
- Relatives: Elizabeth Gutman Kaye (sister)

Adele Gutman Nathan (September 15, 1889 – July 24, 1986) was an American writer and theatrical director. She created historical pageants and events, including at two World's Fairs and at the centennials of the Baltimore and Ohio Railroad (1927), International Harvester (1929), and the Battle of Gettysburg (1963). She also wrote several American history books for young readers.

== Early life and education ==
Gutman was born in Baltimore to a Jewish family, the daughter of Louis K. Gutman and Ida Newburger Gutman. Her father was a department store executive. Her mother founded the Baltimore Music Club and was active in the National Federation of Music Clubs. Her sister Elizabeth Gutman Kaye was a noted soprano and painter. She graduated from Goucher College in 1910, and earned a master's degree at Johns Hopkins University.

== Career ==
=== Theatre ===
Gutman was a suffragist after college, and directed and acted in plays in Provincetown, Baltimore and New York City beginning in the 1910s. She was a founding member of the Vagabonds, and worked with children's theatre specialist Alice Minnie Herts. During World War I, she directed shows for the War Camp Community Service, providing entertainment to troops stationed in the Baltimore area. In summer 1931, she was drama director at Camp Wah-na-gi, a summer arts camp for girls, held on Lake George. She was in charge of the Federal Theatre Project in New Jersey during the 1930s, and a script writer at the United States Department of Education in 1941. In 1954, she taught a course on "Theatre in Industry" for the American Theatre Wing.

=== Pageants ===
Nathan became known as a director of large-scale pageants for commemorating historical events. In 1927, she directed the centennial pageant of the Baltimore and Ohio Railroad. She directed The Dark Mirror in 1928, and The Subway in New York in 1929, a play that Burns Mantle described as "a series of drab experiences." In 1933 she directed a train-themed pageant at the World's Fair in Chicago, In 1934 she directed The Pathways of Progress for the centennial of the city of Rochester, New York, and in 1939 she directed a pageant at the New York World's Fair. In 1949 she directed Forsythorama, the centennial pageant for Forsyth County, North Carolina.

=== Writing, radio, film, clubwork ===
Nathan wrote more than a dozen children's books, and contributed to several newspapers, including The New York Times, and from 1943 to 1944 she was features editor for St. Nicholas Magazine. She was archivist for the American Revolution Roundtable from 1941 to 1950. She was president of The Woman Pays, a feminist club, from 1967 to 1968, and again from 1977 to 1983. Gutman directed short educational films including The Poodle (1936), and Delaware the First State in the Union (1946). In 1975 she gave an interview for WBAI's program In the Living Room. In 1981 she had a cameo role in the film Reds.

== Publications ==
- The Farmer Sows His Wheat (1932)
- Let's Play Garden (1937, with Nadine L. Rand and Elinor G. Loeb)
- The Building of the First Transcontinental Railroad (1950)
- "Pageant Parade; Ancient Form of the Drama is Finding Widespread Popularity with Public" (1950, The New York Times)
- Seven Brave Companions (1953)
- Famous Railroad Stations of the World (1953)
- Wheat Won't Wait (1954)
- When Lincoln Went to Gettysburg (1955)
- The First Transatlantic Cable (1959)
- Churchill's England (1963)
- Major John André, Gentleman Spy (1969)
- How to Plan and Conduct a Bicentennial Celebration (1971)

== Personal life ==
Gutman was married to James Nathan from 1912 until they divorced around 1920. She died in 1986, at the age of 96, in New York City. Her papers are in the Beinecke Rare Book and Manuscript Library at Yale University. The Adele Gutman Nathan Theatrical Fund at Yale supports the acquisition and conservation of theatre history materials. Some of her manuscripts and notes are in the B&O Railroad Museum in Maryland.
