= David Guttman =

Swedish long-distance runner

Personal information
- Full name: David Alexius Guttmann
- Nationality: Swedish
- Born: 24 July 1883 Brunflo, Sweden
- Died: 9 December 1940 (aged 57) Stockholm, Sweden

Sport
- Sport: Long-distance running
- Event: Marathon

David Alexius Guttman (24 July 1883 – 9 December 1940) was a Swedish long-distance runner. He competed in the marathon at the 1912 Summer Olympics. Guttman committed suicide by hanging in 1940.
