= Norman Guttman =

American psychologist

Norman Guttman (1920–1984) was an American psychologist who played a major role in developing scientifically validated operant conditioning methods. He was a student of B. F. Skinner at the University of Minnesota and became prominent in his field.
