= Gloria M. Gutman =

American gerontologist

Gloria Gutman CM OC
- Born: Gloria Margaret Gutman
- Occupation: Gerontologist

Academic work
- Discipline: Gerontology
- Institutions: Simon Fraser University

Gloria Margaret Gutman CM OBC (born July 17, 1939 in Seattle, Washington, USA) is a gerontologist. She is a Professor Emerita at Simon Fraser University (SFU) Gerontology Department and a Research Associate in the Gerontology Research Centre.

== Early life and education ==
Gutman completed her bachelor's degree in Psychology and English in 1961 at the University of British Columbia. She received her masters in Psychology of Aging in 1964 at the University of Alberta, Edmonton, and finished her Doctor of Philosophy in Developmental and Social Psychology in 1970 at the University of British Columbia.

== Career ==
Gutman joined the faculty at Simon Fraser University (SFU) in 1980, where she established the Gerontology Research Centre and the Department of Gerontology. From 2001 until 2005, Gutman served as the 17th President of the International Association of Gerontology. In recognition for her extensive work in the field, she was awarded the Order of British Columbia in 2007. For her far-reaching efforts toward and support of elder abuse research and prevention, she was awarded the Rosalie Wolf Memorial Award from the International Network for the Prevention of Elder Abuse in 2005. She was also awarded the honorary degree of Doctor of Laws by the University of Western Ontario in 2010. From 2012 until 2018, Gutman received a Social Science and Humanities Research Council (SSHRC) grant to conduct a study evaluating knowledge mobilization for older adults.

In December 2016, Gutman was named a Member of the Order of Canada.

In 2011, Gutman organised the first international conference on ageing and climate change as part of the John K. Friesen Conference series. Collaboration with Gary Haq led to Gutman and Haq coining the term 'Climate Gerontology' in 2014 and establishing the new interdisciplinary emergent field.

== Selected publications ==
Robson, C., Marchbank, J, Gutman, G & Prentice, M.(2023). Elder Abuse in the LGBTQ2SA+ Community: the impact of homophobia and transphobia. Springer.

- de Vries, B., Gutman, G., Humble, Á., Gahagan, J., Chamberland, L., Aubert, P., ... & Mock, S. (2019). End-of-life preparations among LGBT older Canadian adults: The missing conversations. The International Journal of Aging and Human Development, 88(4), 358-379.
- Sixsmith, A. & Gutman, G.M. (Eds) (2012) . Technologies for Active Aging. Springer
- Gutman, G.M. & Spencer, C. (Eds) (2010). Aging, Ageism and Abuse: Moving from Awareness to Action. Elsevier.
- Haq, G., Gutman, G. Climate gerontology. Z Gerontol Geriat 47, 462–467 (2014). https://doi.org/10.1007/s00391-014-0677-y
- Hall, N., De Beck, P., Johnson, D., Mackinnon, K., Gutman, G., & Glick, N. (1992). Randomized trial of a health promotion program for frail elders. Canadian Journal on Aging/La Revue Canadienne du vieillissement, 11(1), 72-91.
- Gutman, G. M., Herbert, C. P., & Brown, S. R. (1977). Feldenkrais versus conventional exercises for the elderly. Journal of Gerontology, 32(5), 562-572.
