= Amy Gutman =

American journalist (born 1960)

- Born: November 5, 1960 (age 65); Ann Arbor, Michigan, U.S.
- Education: Harvard Law School
- Occupations: Novelist; journalist

Amy Gutman (born November 5, 1960) is an American novelist, journalist, and lawyer.

== Biography ==
Gutman was born in Ann Arbor, Michigan, she graduated from Harvard College magna cum laude, and became a journalist, working at the Wilson Quarterly in Washington, D.C., and The Tennessean in Nashville. She worked for newspapers in Mississippi before co-founding the Mississippi Teacher Corps.

Gutman graduated from Harvard Law School in 1993, and worked for the firms Cravath, Swaine & Moore and Parcher, Hayes & Snyder in New York City. In 2001, she published her first novel, Equivocal Death. Her second, The Anniversary, was published in 2003.

She worked in alumni relations for Harvard Law School and as communications advisor at Wellesley College. She contributed essays and book reviews to The New York Times, The Chicago Tribune, and other newspapers, was senior facilitator at The Op-Ed Project, and wrote a blog, Plan B Nation.

== Publications ==
- Equivocal Death (2001)
- The Anniversary (2003)
