= Fred E. Gutt =

American World War II flying ace

- Born: October 10, 1919; Kronstadt, Romania
- Died: June 30, 2012 (aged 92); Rolling Bay, Washington
- Military career
- Allegiance: United States
- Branch: United States Marine Corps
- Rank: Captain
- Conflicts: World War II: Guadalcanal Campaign; Battle of the Eastern Solomons
- Awards: Distinguished Flying Cross (2); Air Medal

Fred Ernst Gutt (October 10, 1919 – June 30, 2012) was a United States Marine Corps fighter pilot who became an ace in the Pacific Theatre during World War II.

== Early life ==
Fred E. Gutt was from Madison, Wisconsin, although he was born in Kronstadt, Romania. He was a 1941 graduate of the University of Wisconsin.

== World War II ==
Gutt was assigned to Marine fighter squadron VMF-223. Initially flying Grumman F4F Wildcats, 2d Lt. Gutt arrived with VMF-223 on Guadalcanal on 20 August 1942, to operate as part of the Cactus Air Force. He was evacuated with the unit on 12 October. Reequipped with Vought F4U-1 Corsairs, VMF-223 returned to action in the Solomon Islands in 1943.

On 28 December 1943, Gutt shot down three Japanese fighter planes in less than five minutes during a fighter sweep over Rabaul, bringing his score to seven. He finished his combat duty with eight kills. Four kills were each scored in the F4F and the F4U. He shot down four Mitsubishi A6M Zeros, two Rufes, a float biplane, and a bomber.

Gutt was awarded the Air Medal and the Distinguished Flying Cross twice.
