= Anthony Gutman =

British banker

- Born: Anthony John Gutman; May 1974 (age 51)
- Education: Worcester College, Oxford
- Occupation: Banker
- Title: Co-head, Goldman Sachs' UK Investment Banking
- Spouse: Married
- Children: 3

Anthony John Gutman (born May 1974) is a British banker, the co-head of Goldman Sachs' UK investment banking business.

== Early life ==
Gutman earned a bachelor's degree in Modern History from Worcester College, Oxford, and a CPE and LPC diploma from the London College of Law.

== Career ==
Gutman worked for Citigroup from 2000 to 2007, where he reported to David Wormsley.

Gutman advised on the flotation of Merlin theme parks, Pets at Home retail chain, Virgin Money, and the B&M discount retail chain, and was due for a "multimillion-pound bonus" in 2015.

Gutman is a director of Axiom Europe.

== Personal life ==
Gutman is married with three children.
