= Reuben Guttman =

American attorney

Reuben A. Guttman
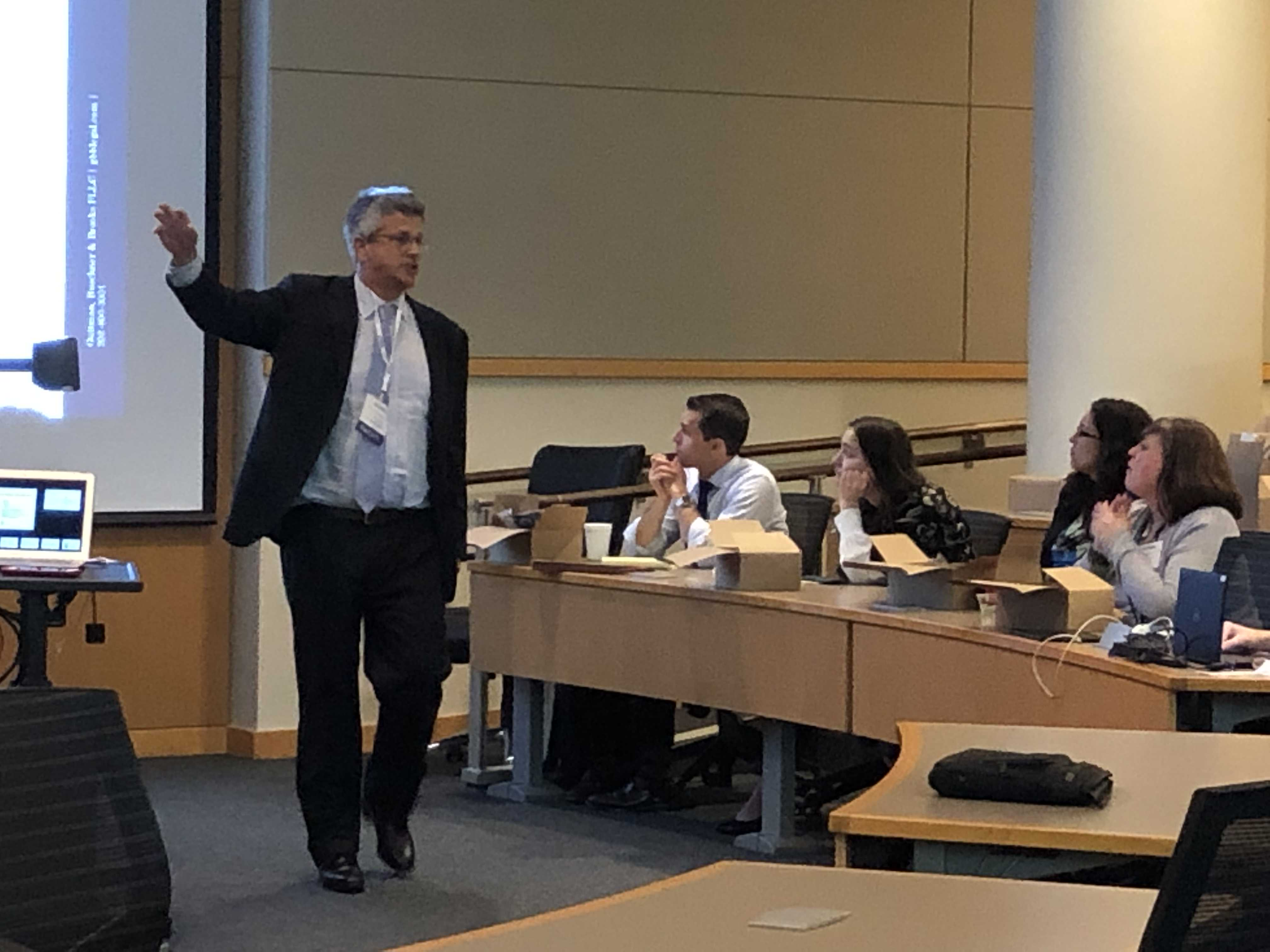
- Mr. Guttman lectures students at a NITA program at Seattle University Law School
- Born: 1959 (age 66–67); New York City, New York, U.S.
- Education: University of Rochester (BA); Emory University (JD)
- Occupations: Partner at Guttman, Buschner & Brooks PLLC

Reuben A. Guttman, born 1959 in New York City, is an American attorney and a founding Partner of Guttman, Buschner & Brooks PLLC ("GBB"), a DC-based plaintiffs' firm His practice involves complex litigation and class actions. He has served as counsel in some of the largest recoveries under the False Claims Act. The International Business Times has called Guttman "one of the world's most prominent whistleblower attorneys," and he has been recognized as a Washingtonian Top Lawyer by Washingtonian Magazine.

Citing "wins recouping billions of dollars for the federal and state governments," a February 19, 2015 profile of Mr. Guttman by the Boston Globe's STAT NEWS referred to him as the "Lawyer Pharma Loves to Hate." Citing a $98 million recovery from Community Health Systems, Inc., Law 360 named Mr. Guttman a "Health Care MVP" and profiled him in a December 1, 2014 article. Author David Dayen, writing in his Book, Chain of Title (The New Press, 2016) cited Mr. Guttman's work on behalf of "robo-signing" whistleblower, Lynn Szymoniak, noting "he had won some of the largest awards in the history of the False Claims Act; there was really nobody better for the case." Writing in their book, The Corporate Whistleblower's Survival Guide, (Berrett-Koehler Publishers, Inc., 2011), authors Tom Devine and Tarek F. Massarani wrote that "in settling qui tam litigation, [Mr. Guttman] has aggressively and successfully negotiated for corrective action against public health and safety consequences from prescription drug fraud." In their book, When Good Companies Go Bad, (ABC CLIO, 2014), authors Donald Beachler and Thomas Shevory profiled Mr. Guttman's off label marketing case against Abbott labs, involving the drug Depakote, which resulted in a $1.6 billion recovery in 2012 for state and federal governments. The Spring, 2013 Cover Story for the Emory Lawyer profiled Mr. Guttman as one of Emory Law School's "leading players" in the area of complex litigation noting that "even before filing a case, Guttman's team engages in intensive investigation, retains experts and prepares as if a trial is imminent." Mr. Guttman is a regular contributor to Medium.

== Background ==
Reuben Guttman earned his J.D. degree in 1985 at Emory University School of Law, and was awarded a bachelor's degree from the University of Rochester in 1981. He is a founding Partner at Guttman, Buschner & Brooks PLLC and is based in the firm's Washington, D.C. office. He is a senior fellow and adjunct professor at the Emory University School of Law – Center for Advocacy and Dispute Resolution. He is a founder of and senior advisor to the Emory Corporate Governance and Accountability Review (ECGAR), published online by Emory University Law School.

== Career ==
In 2012, Guttman served as lead counsel for the lead whistleblower, Meredith McCoyd, in U.S. ex rel. McCoyd v. Abbott Laboratories, resulting in a $1.6 billion recovery for the government. The McCoyd case involved the unlawful marketing of the anti-epileptic drug Depakote. In 2012, he also represented one of the four main whistleblowers in a case against GlaxoSmithKline that returned over $3 billion to the government. That same year, Guttman represented whistleblower Lynn Szymoniak whose qui tam case, involving fraudulent mortgage assignments, was resolved as part of the government's $25 billion settlement with some of the world's largest banks.

In 2013, Guttman was lead counsel in an intervened case by the United States Department of Justice against Pfizer Pharmaceutical involving the kidney-transplant drug Rapamune. On July 30, 2013, The U.S. Department of Justice announced that Pfizer had agreed to pay $491 million to settle criminal and civil charges stemming from the pharmaceutical company's illegal marketing of Rapamune. Guttman represented two whistleblowers—sales representative Marlene Sandler and pharmacist Scott Paris—who brought the initial action in the case, United States ex rel. Sandler et al v. Wyeth Pharmaceuticals, Inc.

Also in 2013, Guttman was lead counsel in U.S. ex rel. Kurnik v. Amgen, Inc. et al., resulting in the recovery of $24.9 million from Amgen. That case exposed kickbacks designed to increase sales of the drug Aranesp.

In 2017, Mr. Guttman served as lead counsel for the plaintiff/relator, Beverly Brown, in the case U.S. ex rel. Beverly Brown v. Celgene Corp., which resulted in the recovery of $280 million.

Guttman represented one of the six main whistleblowers in litigation resulting in the government's September 2009, $2.3 billion settlement with Pfizer Pharmaceutical, and he served as counsel in U.S. ex rel. Johnson v. Shell Oil Co., in which over $300 million was recovered from the oil industry as a result of allegations of unpaid oil royalties. On behalf of a European whistleblower, Guttman was counsel in U.S. ex rel. Bunk v. Birkart, a litigation that resulted in a $13 million settlement with the U.S. government. The Birkart case stemmed from an alleged conspiracy to fix the price of shipping services sold to the U.S. Defense Department.

Guttman served as lead counsel in a series of cases resulting in the recovery of more than $30 million to mid-western meatpackers under the Federal Fair Labor Standards Act. Cases he brought on behalf of nuclear weapons workers at the United States Government "Manhattan Project" nuclear weapons sites resulted in congressional oversight and changes in procurement practices, and dread disease compensation legislation, affecting the nation's nuclear weapons complex and its workforce.

Guttman served as counsel for the whistleblowers including the Natural Resources Defense Counsel in an intervened action against Lockheed. The Lockheed matter arose from the cleanup of the U.S. Government gaseous diffusion plant in Paducah, Kentucky.

Guttman has testified before committees of the United States House of Representatives and the United States Senate on the Asbestos Hazard Emergency Response Act (AHERA). In 1992, he advised President-elect Clinton's transition team on labor policy and worker health and safety regulation.

== Academic career ==
Guttman is a senior fellow and adjunct professor at the Emory University School of Law Center for Advocacy and Dispute Resolution and has been a team leader for Emory Law School's Kessler-Eidson Trial Techniques Program. In 2013, he was elected to the board of the American Constitution Society for Law and Policy. For the Fall Semester, 2012, Guttman was appointed as an adjunct professor at the Rutgers University Law School, where he taught in the trial program.

As part of a U.S. State Department program in conjunction with the Emory Law School Center for Advocacy and Dispute Resolution, Guttman has been one of five visiting professors at Universidad Panamericana in Mexico City training Mexican judges and practitioners on oral advocacy and trial practice. Guttman was one of four Emory faculty members who traveled to Shanghai, China in 2013 to participate in a program to train financial fraud prosecutors on the investigation and prosecution of insider trading cases.

Guttman is a faculty member of the National Institute of Trial Advocacy. He has been a guest lecturer at a number of universities including Jiao Tong University in Shanghai, Peking University in Beijing and Renmin University in Beijing. In 2006, he was invited by the Dutch Embassy in China to participate in a dialogue with Chinese scholars and worker representatives on China's labor laws.

== Publications and Commentary ==
Guttman is the author and/or editor of numerous articles, book chapters, and technical publications and his commentary has appeared in Market Watch, Marketplace, American Lawyer Media, AOL Government, Accounting Today, the Austin American-Statesman, and The Jerusalem Post.

His article, Pharmaceutical Regulation in the United States; A Confluence of Influences, was published in Chinese by the Peking University Public Interest Law Journal. He is co-author of Gonzalez v. Hewitt, SEC v. HG Pharmaceutical, and U.S. ex Rel. Rodriguez v. Hughes, which are case files published by the Emory University School of Law Center for Advocacy and Dispute Resolution (2010) and used to train law students and practicing attorneys. Among his publications, Guttman is co-author of Chapters 5–10 in Internal Investigations 2012: How to Protect Your Clients or Companies in the Global, Post Dodd-Frank World. Among other publications, he wrote The Occupational Safety and Health Administration: Guidance for Compliance, published as Chapter 18 in Environmental Management in Healthcare Facilities; The Dormant Commerce Clause and Interstate Transportation of Waste, published in the University of Pennsylvania Journal of Resource Management and Technology; and co-authored The Asbestos Model: Labor and Citizens and a Multi-Pronged Approach to Regulatory Change, published as a chapter in Conflict Resolution and Public Policy.

He has appeared on ABC Nightly News, CNN, Bloomberg News, and IBTimes TV. He has been quoted in publications including the International Business Times, The Wall Street Journal, The New York Times, The Washington Post, the Los Angeles Times, The Atlanta Journal-Constitution, USA Today, The Dallas Morning News, and national wire services including the Associated Press, Reuters and Bloomberg.

Guttman's commentary on politics and the law has appeared in The European Lawyer, Law 360, The Austin-Statesman and The Jerusalem Post. He also writes a regular blog for its affiliated website, The Global Legal Post. He has been a regular contributor to the blog for the American Constitution Society. He is listed as a SuperLawyer and also was cited in Grant & Eisenhofer's recognition by the National Law Journal as one of the nation's hottest Plaintiff's firms for 2012.
