= Jakob Guttmann (sculptor) =

Hungarian sculptor

Jakob Guttmann (c. 1811 – April 28, 1860) was a Hungarian Jewish sculptor.

Guttmann was born in Arad, then in Hungary. In his early childhood he carved toys, and in 1833 he went to Vienna to satisfy his artistic cravings. There he became an engraver and worked for three years with his burin. He then received a scholarship from Prince Metternich enabling him to study at the Vienna Academy of Fine Arts. He remained there until 1843, receiving awards for an embossed profile in wax of the emperor Joseph II and for a steel-engraving of Metastasio.

In 1844 Guttmann produced a bronze statuette of Baron Salomon von Rothschild from a portrait, and was commissioned by him to execute a replica in marble. The Baron also paid Guttmann an annuity, thus enabling him to go to Rome. There he modeled a bust of Pope Pius IX and completed his masterpiece, Der Blumenspender.

While in Rome, Guttmann was deeply interested in the ghetto, which he described in letters to his father. Later he went to Paris, and in 1857 he became insane. He died in Vienna.

== Bibliography ==
- Müller and Singer, Allgemeines Künstler-Lexicon, ii. 110, Frankfort-on-the-Main, 1896;
- Wertheimer's Jahrbuch, iv. 87 et seq.
