= Jakob Guttmann (rabbi) =

Jakob Guttmann (22 April 1845 in Beuthen, Oberschlesien – 29 September 1919 in Breslau) was a German-Jewish philosopher of religion (Religionsphilosoph) and rabbi. He officiated as chief rabbi of the Land rabbinate of Hildesheim between 1874 and 1892. Thereafter he served as rabbi in Breslau until his death.

== Life ==
Guttmann was the son of a merchant from Beuthen (now Bytom). In 1861 he entered the Jewish Theological Seminary in Breslau (now Wrocław). He studied philosophy at the University of Breslau, graduating in 1868 with a doctorate on the philosophy of Descartes and Spinoza. In 1874 he became a rabbi in Hildesheim, and from 1892 he was a rabbi of the liberal Jewish community in Breslau. In 1910, he was elected chairman of the Rabbinical Union in Germany, a post he held until 1919.

He also conducted active academic research, specializing in the study of the works of medieval Jewish theologians and philosophers. These studies included Abraham ibn Daud, Saadia Gaon, Solomon ibn Gabirol, Maimonides, and Isaac Abarbanel as well as works on the influence of Medieval Jewish philosophy on the views of Christian philosophers such as Thomas Aquinas and Duns Scotus.

From 1911, Guttmann chaired the Society for the Promotion of Jewish Science. He was the father of Julius Guttmann.

== Works ==
- Die Religionsphilosophie des Abraham ibn Daud aus Toledo. Göttingen 1879.
- Die Religionsphilosophie des Saadja. Göttingen 1882 (Online, Online, Online).
- Die Philosophie des Solomon ibn Gabirol. Göttingen : Vandenhoeck & Ruprecht 1889, Repr. Hildesheim : Olms 1979 (Online).
- Das Verhältnis des Thomas von Aquino zum Judentum und zur jüdischen Literatur. Göttingen 1891 (Online).
- Die Beziehungen des Johannes Duns Scotus zum Judenthum. In: Monatsschrift für Geschichte und Wissenschaft des Judentums 38/1 (1893), pp. 26–39. (Online).
- Über Dogmenbildung im Judenthum. Verein für jüdische Geschichte und Literatur zu Breslau. Breslau, Wilh. Jacobsohn & Co., 1894.
- Über einige Theologen des Franziskanerordens und ihre Beziehungen zum Judenthum. In: Monatsschrift für Geschichte und Wissenschaft des Judentums 40/7 (1896), pp. 314–329 (Online).
- Die Scholastik des 13. Jahrhunderts in ihren Beziehungen zum Judentum und zur jüdischen Literatur. Breslau 1902 (Online, Online).
- ed. with W. Bacher: Moses Ben Maimon, sein Leben, seine Werke und sein Einfluss. Leipzig: Fock 1908 (Online).
- Die religionsphilosophischen Lehren des Isaak Abravanel. Breslau: Marcus 1916 (Online).
- Fest- u. Sabbatpredigten. Ed. by Julius Guttmann, Frankfurt am Main: J. Kauffmann 1926.
