= Gelse =

Gelse Gelša (in Croatian)
- Village
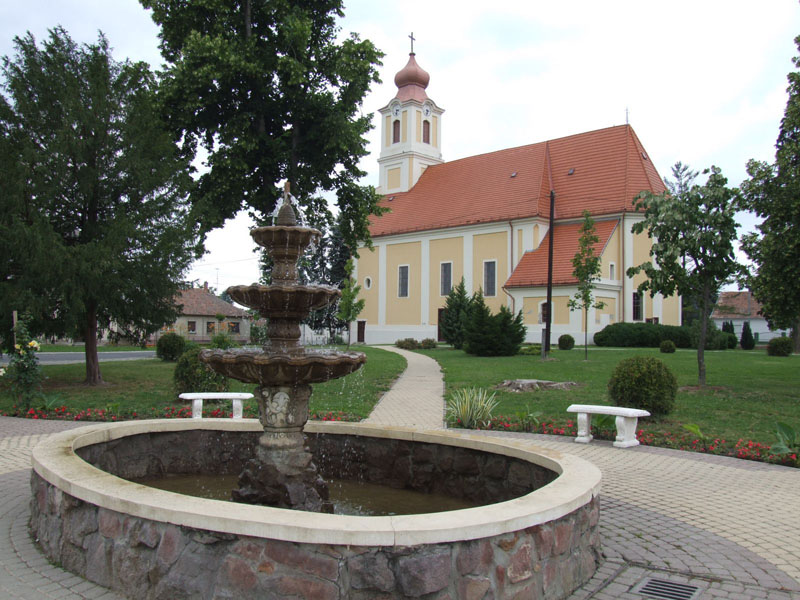

- Flag Coat of arms

- Location of Gelse
- Coordinates: 46.60263°N 16.98922°E
- Country: Hungary
- Region: Western Transdanubia
- County: Zala
- District: Nagykanizsa

Area
  - Total: 22.45 km^{2} (8.67 sq mi)

Population (1 January 2025)
  - Total: 970
  - Density: 43/km^{2} (110/sq mi)
- Time zone: UTC+1 (CET)
  - Summer (DST): UTC+2 (CEST)
- Postal code: 8774
- Area code: (+36) 93
- Website: gelse.hu

Gelse (Croatian: Gelša) is a village in Zala County, Hungary. As of 2014 the population is 1110. Most people are Roman Catholic.
