= Im Kinsky =

Austrian auction house

Auktionshaus im Kinsky GmbH
- Company type: Private
- Industry: Auctions
- Headquarters: Vienna, Austria
- Key people: Michael Kovacek
- Website: www.imkinsky.com

im Kinsky is an art auction house located in Vienna's Palais Kinsky. The auctioneer of the house is Michael Kovacek.

== Locations ==
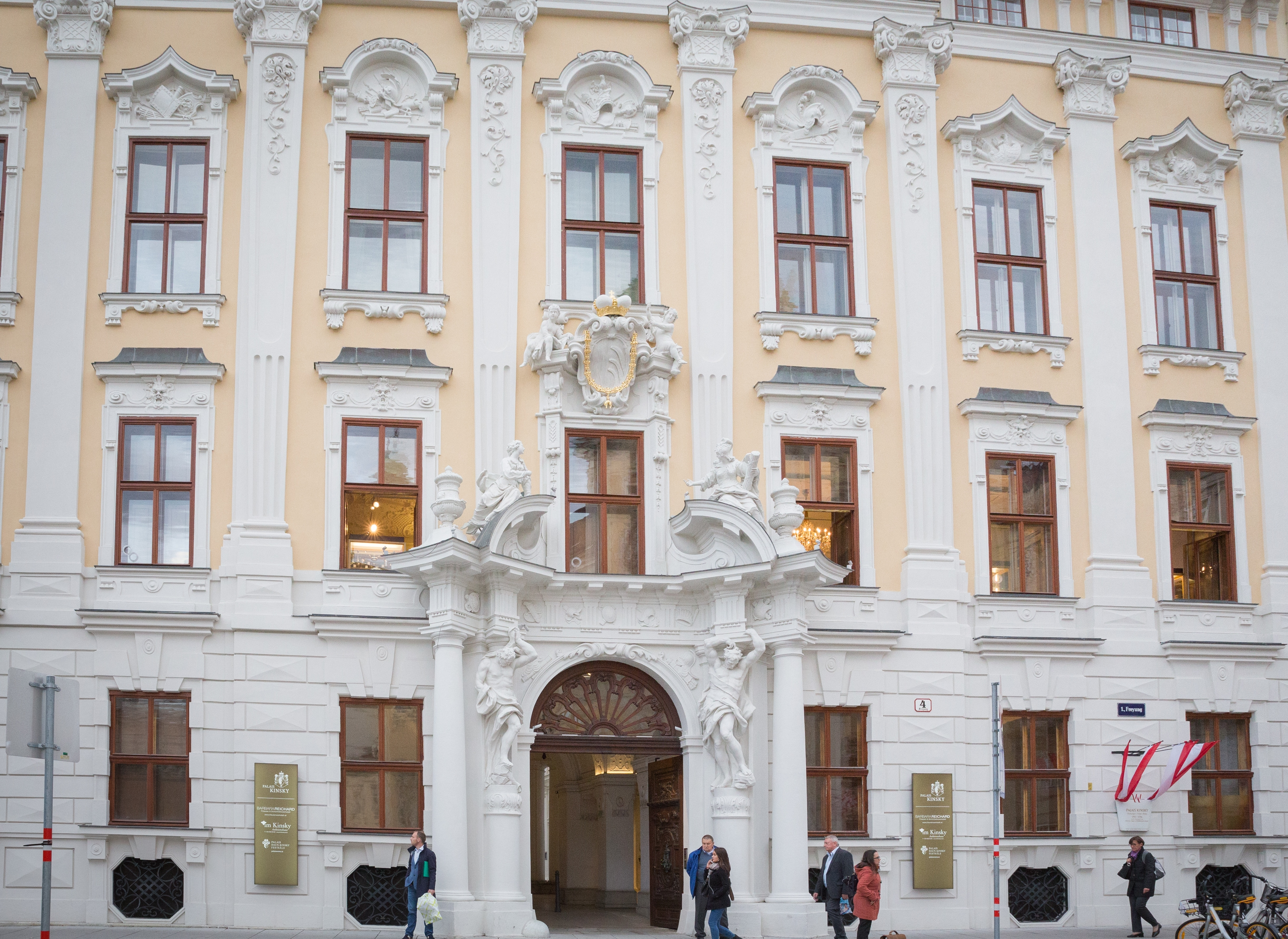
The Kinsky Palace in Vienna

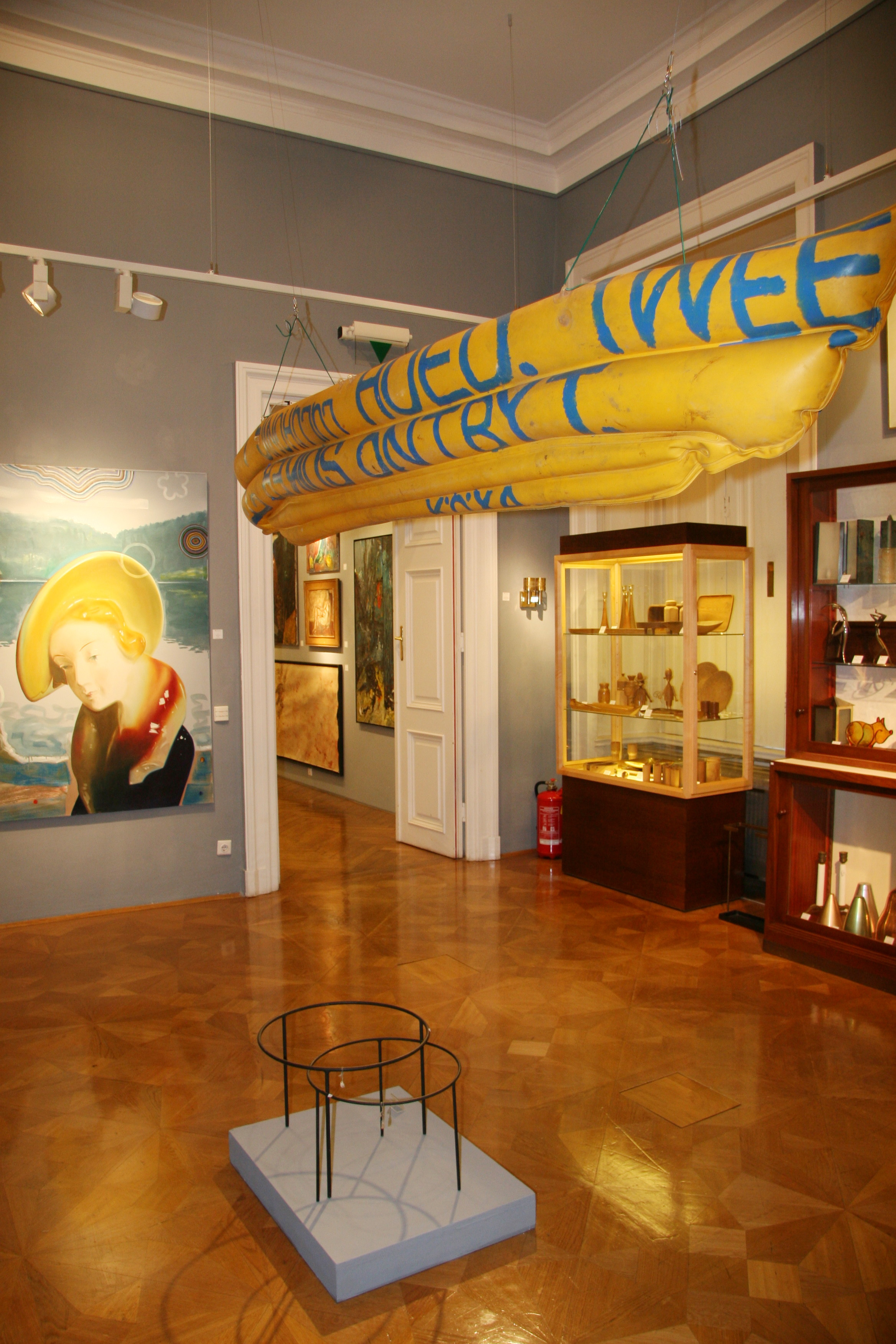
Exposition space at im Kinsky

The auction house specialized in Austrian art, in particular modern and contemporary art, though it also deals with the Art Nouveau, antiques, Asian, Old Masters and 19th Century paintings.

== Auctions ==
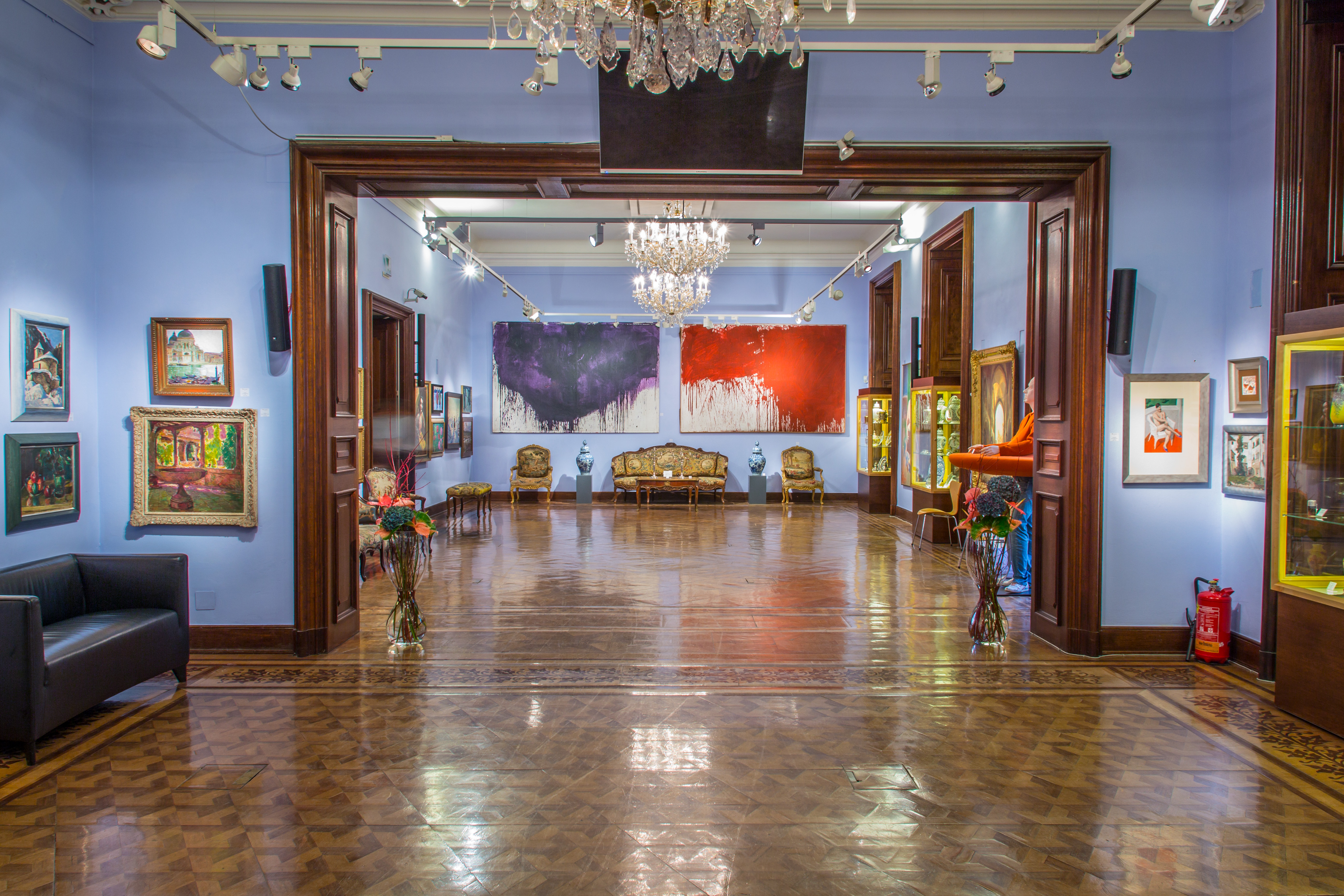
Auction room at Im Kinsky

In almost 90 auctions, im Kinsky has set records on the Austrian art market. Egon Schiele's Girl from 1917 at a price of 3,562,400 euros, recorded the highest price ever achieved in Austria for a work of art. Other records were set by Egon Schiele's View of Krumau (1,233,000 euros), Ferdinand Georg Waldmüller's The End of School Lessons (1,061,000 euros) and Gustav Klimt's Helene (1,037,000 euros). im Kinsky holds four of the five highest auction sales ever achieved in Austria. In 2010, Egon Schiele's The Procession was auctioned at the Kinsky for 4,437,400 euros.

On April 12, 2016, at the request of the French Ministry of Culture and an order from the Vienna Public Prosecutor's Office, the auction of Portrait of a Gentleman by Bartholomeus van der Helst from 1647, which had been stolen by the Nazis in 1943, was stopped.
