= 2015–16 Sporting CP season =

Sporting CP
2015–16 season
- President: Bruno de Carvalho
- Manager: Jorge Jesus
- Stadium: Estádio José Alvalade
- Primeira Liga: 2nd
- Taça de Portugal: Fifth round
- Taça da Liga: Third round
- Supertaça Cândido de Oliveira: Winners
- UEFA Champions League: Play-off round
- UEFA Europa League: Round of 32
- Top goalscorer: League: Islam Slimani (27); All: Islam Slimani (31)
- Highest home attendance: 49,699; Sporting CP 0–1 Benfica (5 March 2016)
- Lowest home attendance: 20,567; Sporting CP 5–1 Skënderbeu Korçë (22 October 2015)
- Average home league attendance: 39,988
Home colours	Away colours	Third colours

This article shows Sporting Clube de Portugal's player statistics and all matches that the club played during the 2015–16 season.

== Pre-season and friendlies ==
Win Draw Loss

15 July 2015 Friendly	Sporting CP (Portugal)	3–1	(Portugal) Mafra	Alcochete
18:00 WEST (UTC+01:00)				Stadium: CGD Stadium Aurélio Pereira

18 July 2015 Friendly	Sporting CP (Portugal)	5–0	(Portugal) Atlético CP	Alcochete
09:00 WEST (UTC+01:00)				Stadium: CGD Stadium Aurélio Pereira

24 July 2015 Cape Town Cup Semi-final	Ajax Cape Town (South Africa)	2–2 (2–4 p)	(Portugal) Sporting CP	Cape Town
20:15 SAST (UTC+02:00)	Lolo 68' (pen.); Cale 80'	Report	Mané 19'; Semedo 84'	Stadium: Cape Town Stadium
	Penalties
	Graham (penalty scored); Cale (penalty missed); Losper (penalty scored); Mobara (penalty missed)		Gutiérrez (penalty scored); Wallyson (penalty scored); Montero (penalty scored); Esgaio (penalty scored)

26 July 2015 Cape Town Cup Final	Crystal Palace (England)	0–2	(Portugal) Sporting CP	Cape Town
15:30 SAST (UTC+02:00)		Report	Montero 71', 86'	Stadium: Cape Town Stadium

1 August 2015 Troféu Cinco Violinos	Sporting CP (Portugal)	2–0	(Italy) Roma	Lisbon
19:45 WEST (UTC+01:00)	Slimani 63'; Mané 70'			Stadium: Estádio José Alvalade; Referee: Tiago Martins (Portugal)

== Competitions ==
=== Overall record ===
Performance by competition
Competition	Starting round	Final position/round	First match	Last match
Primeira Liga	—N/a	2nd	14 August 2015	15 May 2016
Taça de Portugal	Third round	Fifth round	17 October 2015	16 December 2015
Taça da Liga	Third round	Third round (2nd)	29 December 2015	26 January 2016
Supertaça	—N/a	Winners	9 August 2015	
UEFA Champions League	Play-off round	Play-off round	18 August 2015	26 August 2015
UEFA Europa League	Group stage	Round of 32	17 September 2015	25 February 2016

Statistics by competition
Competition	Pld	W	D	L	GF	GA	GD	Win%
Primeira Liga	34	27	5	2	79	21	+58	79.41
Taça de Portugal	3	2	0	1	9	5	+4	66.67
Taça da Liga	3	2	0	1	4	3	+1	66.67
Supertaça	1	1	0	0	1	0	+1	100.00
UEFA Champions League	2	1	0	1	3	4	−1	50.00
UEFA Europa League	8	3	1	4	15	15	+0	37.50
Total	51	36	6	9	111	48	+63	70.59

=== Supertaça Cândido de Oliveira ===
9 August 2015	Benfica	0–1	Sporting CP	Faro/Loulé
20:45 WEST (UTC+01:00)		Report	Gutiérrez 53'	Stadium: Estádio Algarve; Attendance: 28,717; Referee: Jorge Sousa; Man of the Match: André Carrillo

=== Primeira Liga ===
==== League table ====
Pos	Team	Pld	W	D	L	GF	GA	GD	Pts	Qualification or relegation
1	Benfica (C)	34	29	1	4	88	22	+66	88	Qualification for the Champions League group stage
2	Sporting CP	34	27	5	2	79	21	+58	86	Qualification for the Champions League group stage
3	Porto	34	23	4	7	67	30	+37	73	Qualification for the Champions League play-off round
4	Braga	34	16	10	8	54	35	+19	58	Qualification for the Europa League group stage (Note: Braga qualified for the Europa League group stage by winning the 2015–16 Taça de Portugal.)
5	Arouca	34	13	15	6	47	38	+9	54	Qualification for the Europa League third qualifying round

Source: Liga Portugal, Soccerway
Rules for classification: 1) Points; 2) Head-to-head points; 3) Head-to-head goal difference; 4) Head-to-head away goals scored; 5) Goal difference; 6) Matches won; 7) Goals scored; 8) Play-off.
(Note: LPFP decided that only criteria 1, 5, 6 and 7 would be applied to establish the classification during the competition.)
(C) Champions

==== Results by round ====
Round	1	2	3	4	5	6	7	8	9	10	11	12	13	14	15	16	17	18	19	20	21	22	23	24	25	26	27	28	29	30	31	32	33	34
Ground	A	H	A	A	H	A	H	A	H	A	H	A	H	A	H	A	H	H	A	H	H	A	H	A	H	A	H	A	H	A	H	A	H	A
Result	W	D	W	W	W	D	W	W	W	W	W	W	W	L	W	W	W	D	W	W	D	W	W	D	L	W	W	W	W	W	W	W	W	W
Position	5	6	2	2	2	2	2	1	1	1	1	1	1	2	1	1	1	1	1	1	2	1	1	1	2	2	2	2	2	2	2	2	2	2

Source: LPFP
A = Away; H = Home; W = Win; D = Draw; L = Loss

==== Matches ====
16 August 2015 1	Tondela	1–2	Sporting CP	Aveiro
20:30 WEST (UTC+01:00)	Luís Alberto 58'	Report	João Mário 15'; A. Silva 90+8' (pen.)	Stadium: Estádio Municipal de Aveiro; Attendance: 22,003; Referee: Carlos Xistra

22 August 2015 2	Sporting CP	1–1	Paços de Ferreira	Lisbon
18:30 WEST (UTC+01:00)	Carrillo 41'	Report	Pelé 80' (pen.)	Stadium: Estádio José Alvalade; Attendance: 40,639; Referee: Manuel Oliveira

30 August 2015 3	Académica	1–3	Sporting CP	Coimbra
19:15 WEST (UTC+01:00)	Rabiola 33' (pen.)	Report	Mané 6'; Slimani 24'; Aquilani 83' (pen.)	Stadium: Estádio Cidade de Coimbra; Attendance: 12,903; Referee: Bruno Esteves

13 September 2015 4	Rio Ave	1–2	Sporting CP	Vila do Conde
19:15 WEST (UTC+01:00)	Yazalde 69'	Report	A. Silva 10' (pen.); Slimani 39'	Stadium: Estádio do Rio Ave FC; Attendance: 6,685; Referee: Hugo Miguel

21 September 2015 5	Sporting CP	1–0	Nacional	Lisbon
21:00 WEST (UTC+01:00)	Montero 86'	Report		Stadium: Estádio José Alvalade; Attendance: 30,057; Referee: Fábio Veríssimo

26 September 2015 6	Boavista	0–0	Sporting CP	Porto
20:45 WEST (UTC+01:00)		Report		Stadium: Estádio do Bessa; Attendance: 9,373; Referee: Artur Soares Dias

4 October 2015 7	Sporting CP	5–1	Vitória de Guimarães	Lisbon
20:30 WEST (UTC+01:00)	Slimani 12', 58', 78'; Gutiérrez 24'; A. Silva 60'	Report	Josué 82'	Stadium: Estádio José Alvalade; Attendance: 31,295; Referee: Rui Costa

25 October 2015 8	Benfica	0–3	Sporting CP	Lisbon
17:00 WET (UTC±00:00)		Report	Gutiérrez 9'; Slimani 21'; Ruiz 36'	Stadium: Estádio da Luz; Attendance: 63,054; Referee: Carlos Xistra

31 October 2015 9	Sporting CP	1–0	Estoril	Lisbon
20:45 WET (UTC±00:00)	Gutiérrez 55' (pen.)	Report		Stadium: Estádio José Alvalade; Attendance: 40,144; Referee: Jorge Ferreira

8 November 2015 10	Arouca	0–1	Sporting CP	Arouca
20:30 WET (UTC±00:00)		Report	Slimani 90'	Stadium: Estádio Municipal de Arouca; Attendance: 3,156; Referee: Cosme Machado

30 November 2015 11	Sporting CP	1–0	Belenenses	Lisbon
19:00 WET (UTC±00:00)	Carvalho 90+4' (pen.)	Report		Stadium: Estádio José Alvalade; Attendance: 31,744; Referee: Artur Soares Dias

5 December 2015 12	Marítimo	0–1	Sporting CP	Funchal
20:45 WET (UTC±00:00)		Report	A. Silva 54'	Stadium: Estádio dos Barreiros; Attendance: 7,139; Referee: Rui Costa

13 December 2015 13	Sporting CP	3–1	Moreirense	Lisbon
18:15 WET (UTC±00:00)	G. Martins 29'; Aquilani 37'; Slimani 58'	Report	R. Martins 80' (pen.)	Stadium: Estádio José Alvalade; Attendance: 32,367; Referee: Nuno Almeida

20 December 2015 14	União da Madeira	1–0	Sporting CP	Funchal
18:15 WET (UTC±00:00)	Dias 69'	Report		Stadium: Estádio da Madeira; Attendance: 3,594; Referee: Vasco Santos

2 January 2016 15	Sporting CP	2–0	Porto	Lisbon
20:45 WET (UTC±00:00)	Slimani 27', 85'	Report		Stadium: Estádio José Alvalade; Attendance: 49,382; Referee: Hugo Miguel

6 January 2016 16	Vitória de Setúbal	0–6	Sporting CP	Setúbal
20:15 WET (UTC±00:00)		Report	Slimani 18', 52'; Bruno César 41', 60'; João Mário 58'; Aquilani 85'	Stadium: Estádio do Bonfim; Attendance: 6,560; Referee: Jorge Ferreira

10 January 2016 17	Sporting CP	3–2	Braga	Lisbon
16:00 WET (UTC±00:00)	A. Silva 58' (pen.); Montero 76'; Slimani 89'	Report	Eduardo 40'; R. Silva 45'	Stadium: Estádio José Alvalade; Attendance: 42,148; Referee: Jorge Sousa

15 January 2016 18	Sporting CP	2–2	Tondela	Lisbon
20:30 WET (UTC±00:00)	Slimani 54'; G. Martins 61'	Report	Nathan 31' (pen.); Chamorro 85'	Stadium: Estádio José Alvalade; Attendance: 36,902; Referee: Luís Ferreira

23 January 2016 19	Paços de Ferreira	1–3	Sporting CP	Paços de Ferreira
20:45 WET (UTC±00:00)	Moreira 83'	Report	Bruno César 40'; Slimani 63', 84'	Stadium: Estádio Capital do Móvel; Attendance: 5,920; Referee: Artur Soares Dias

30 January 2016 20	Sporting CP	3–2	Académica	Lisbon
20:45 WET (UTC±00:00)	A. Silva 30'; Ruiz 43'; Montero 84'	Report	Rafa 8'; Ewerton 58' (o.g.)	Stadium: Estádio José Alvalade; Attendance: 40,319; Referee: Cosme Machado

8 February 2016 21	Sporting CP	0–0	Rio Ave	Lisbon
19:00 WET (UTC±00:00)		Report		Stadium: Estádio José Alvalade; Attendance: 39,721; Referee: Carlos Xistra

13 February 2016 22	Nacional	0–4	Sporting CP	Funchal
18:30 WET (UTC±00:00)		Report	Slimani 3', 86' (pen.); A. Silva 52' (pen.); João Mário 63'	Stadium: Estádio da Madeira; Attendance: 4,127; Referee: Bruno Paixão

22 February 2016 23	Sporting CP	2–0	Boavista	Lisbon
20:00 WET (UTC±00:00)	Ewerton 37'; Ruiz 45'	Report		Stadium: Estádio José Alvalade; Attendance: 37,083; Referee: Rui Costa

29 February 2016 24	Vitória de Guimarães	0–0	Sporting CP	Guimarães
20:00 WET (UTC±00:00)		Report		Stadium: Estádio D. Afonso Henriques; Attendance: 19,924; Referee: Tiago Martins

5 March 2016 25	Sporting CP	0–1	Benfica	Lisbon
20:45 WET (UTC±00:00)		Report	Mitroglou 20'	Stadium: Estádio José Alvalade; Attendance: 49,699; Referee: Artur Soares Dias

12 March 2016 26	Estoril	1–2	Sporting CP	Estoril
18:30 WET (UTC±00:00)	Bonatini 79'	Report	Slimani 5', 45'	Stadium: Estádio António Coimbra da Mota; Attendance: 7,739; Referee: Manuel Mota

19 March 2016 27	Sporting CP	5–1	Arouca	Lisbon
18:30 WET (UTC±00:00)	Gutiérrez 15', 45'; João Mário 18', 32'; Ruiz 59'	Report	Gegé 67'	Stadium: Estádio José Alvalade; Attendance: 46,014; Referee: Manuel Oliveira

4 April 2016 28	Belenenses	2–5	Sporting CP	Lisbon
21:00 WEST (UTC+01:00)	Bakić 76'; T. Silva 89'	Report	Slimani 23', 32' (pen.); A. Silva 54'; Gutiérrez 58', 78'	Stadium: Estádio do Restelo; Attendance: 12,487; Referee: Tiago Martins

9 April 2016 29	Sporting CP	3–1	Marítimo	Lisbon
20:45 WEST (UTC+01:00)	Gutiérrez 42'; Carvalho 53'; Slimani 76'	Report	Ghazaryan 81'	Stadium: Estádio José Alvalade; Attendance: 44,230; Referee: Nuno Almeida

16 April 2016 30	Moreirense	0–1	Sporting CP	Moreira de Cónegos
20:45 WEST (UTC+01:00)		Report	Slimani 16'	Stadium: Parque de Jogos Comendador Joaquim de Almeida Freitas; Attendance: 4,840; Referee: Bruno Paixão

23 April 2016 31	Sporting CP	2–0	União da Madeira	Lisbon
18:30 WEST (UTC+01:00)	Gutiérrez 7'; João Mário 19'	Report		Stadium: Estádio José Alvalade; Attendance: 44,719; Referee: Rui Costa

30 April 2016 32	Porto	1–3	Sporting CP	Porto
18:30 WEST (UTC+01:00)	Herrera 35' (pen.)	Report	Slimani 23', 44'; Bruno César 85'	Stadium: Estádio do Dragão; Attendance: 41,316; Referee: Artur Soares Dias

7 May 2016 33	Sporting CP	5–0	Vitória de Setúbal	Lisbon
20:45 WEST (UTC+01:00)	G. Martins 25', 54'; Gutiérrez 37'; Ruiz 71', 90+2'	Report		Stadium: Estádio José Alvalade; Attendance: 43,327; Referee: Tiago Martins

15 May 2016 34	Braga	0–4	Sporting CP	Braga
17:00 WEST (UTC+01:00)		Report	Gutiérrez 20'; Slimani 32'; Ruiz 71', 80'	Stadium: Estádio Municipal de Braga; Attendance: 19,428; Referee: Hugo Miguel

=== Taça de Portugal ===
==== Third round ====
17 October 2015	Vilafranquense	0–4	Sporting CP	Estoril
17:30 WEST (UTC+01:00)			M. Pereira 12', 16'; Bruno Paulista 41'; G. Martins 77'	Stadium: Estádio António Coimbra da Mota; Attendance: 2,832; Referee: Sérgio Piscarreta

==== Fourth round ====
21 November 2015	Sporting CP	2–1 (a.e.t.)	Benfica	Lisbon
20:00 WET (UTC±00:00)	A. Silva 45+2'; Slimani 112'		Mitroglou 6'	Stadium: Estádio José Alvalade; Attendance: 41,244; Referee: Jorge Sousa

==== Fifth round ====
16 December 2015	Braga	4–3 (a.e.t.)	Sporting CP	Braga
20:00 WET (UTC±00:00)	Eduardo 42'; Alan 54'; Marcelo Goiano 83'; Fonte 111'		Ruiz 10'; Slimani 57'; Carvalho 67'	Stadium: Estádio Municipal de Braga; Attendance: 10,863; Referee: Fábio Veríssimo

=== Taça da Liga ===
==== Third round ====
Pos	Team	Pld	W	D	L	GF	GA	GD	Pts	Qualification
1	Portimonense	3	3	0	0	9	3	+6	9	Advance to knockout phase
2	Sporting CP	3	2	0	1	4	3	+1	6	
3	Paços de Ferreira	3	0	1	2	4	7	−3	1	
4	Arouca	3	0	1	2	2	6	−4	1	

Source: LPFP
Rules for classification: Tiebreakers

29 December 2015 1	Sporting CP	3–1	Paços de Ferreira	Lisbon
20:00 WET (UTC±00:00)	Aquilani 8'; G. Martins 52'; Ruiz 72'	Report	Christian 45+2'	Stadium: Estádio José Alvalade; Attendance: 23,462; Referee: Manuel Mota

19 January 2016 2	Portimonense	2–0	Sporting CP	Portimão
19:45 WET (UTC±00:00)	Ewerton 36', 90+2' (pen.)	Report		Stadium: Estádio Municipal de Portimão; Attendance: 4,673; Referee: Manuel Oliveira

26 January 2016 3	Arouca	0–1	Sporting CP	Arouca
18:30 WET (UTC±00:00)		Report	Zeegelaar 81'	Stadium: Estádio Municipal de Arouca; Attendance: 956; Referee: Fábio Veríssimo

=== UEFA Champions League ===
==== Play-off round ====
18 August 2015 1st leg	Sporting CP (Portugal)	2–1	(Russia) CSKA Moscow	Lisbon
20:45 CEST (UTC+02:00)	Gutiérrez 12'; Slimani 82'	Report	Doumbia 40'	Stadium: Estádio José Alvalade; Attendance: 41,826; Referee: Cüneyt Çakır (Turkey)

26 August 2015 2nd leg	CSKA Moscow (Russia)	3–1 (4–3 agg.)	(Portugal) Sporting CP	Khimki
20:45 CEST (UTC+02:00)	Doumbia 49', 72'; Musa 85'	Report	Gutiérrez 36'	Stadium: Arena Khimki; Attendance: 17,259; Referee: Pavel Královec (Czech Republic)

=== UEFA Europa League ===
==== Group stage ====
Pos	Team	Pld	W	D	L	GF	GA	GD	Pts	Qualification	LMO	SPO	BES	SKE
1	(Russia) Lokomotiv Moscow	6	3	2	1	12	7	+5	11	Advance to knockout phase	—	2–4	1–1	2–0
2	(Portugal) Sporting CP	6	3	1	2	14	11	+3	10	Advance to knockout phase	1–3	—	3–1	5–1
3	(Turkey) Beşiktaş	6	2	3	1	7	6	+1	9		1–1	1–1	—	2–0
4	(Albania) Skënderbeu	6	1	0	5	4	13	−9	3		0–3	3–0	0–1	—

Source: Soccerway
Rules for classification: Group stage tiebreakers

17 September 2015 1	Sporting CP (Portugal)	1–3	(Russia) Lokomotiv Moscow	Lisbon
21:05 CEST (UTC+02:00)	Montero 50'	Report	Samedov 12', 56'; Niasse 65'	Stadium: Estádio José Alvalade; Attendance: 25,400; Referee: Robert Schörgenhofer (Austria)

1 October 2015 2	Beşiktaş (Turkey)	1–1	(Portugal) Sporting CP	Istanbul
19:00 CEST (UTC+02:00)	Töre 61'	Report	Ruiz 16'	Stadium: Atatürk Olympic Stadium; Attendance: 25,827; Referee: Paolo Tagliavento (Italy)

22 October 2015 3	Sporting CP (Portugal)	5–1	(Albania) Skënderbeu Korçë	Lisbon
19:00 CEST (UTC+02:00)	Aquilani 38' (pen.); Montero 41' (pen.); M. Pereira 64', 77'; Figueiredo 69'	Report	Jashanica 89'	Stadium: Estádio José Alvalade; Attendance: 20,567; Referee: Clayton Pisani (Malta)

5 November 2015 4	Skënderbeu Korçë (Albania)	3–0	(Portugal) Sporting CP	Elbasan
21:05 CET (UTC+01:00)	Lilaj 15', 19' (pen.); Nimaga 55'	Report		Stadium: Elbasan Arena; Attendance: 1,783; Referee: Kristo Tohver (Estonia)

26 November 2015 5	Lokomotiv Moscow (Russia)	2–4	(Portugal) Sporting CP	Moscow
19:00 CET (UTC+01:00)	Maicon 5'; Miranchuk 86'	Report	Montero 20'; Ruiz 38'; G. Martins 43'; M. Pereira 60'	Stadium: Lokomotiv Stadium; Attendance: 11,043; Referee: Antonio Mateu Lahoz (Spain)

10 December 2015 6	Sporting CP (Portugal)	3–1	(Turkey) Beşiktaş	Lisbon
21:05 CET (UTC+01:00)	Slimani 67'; Ruiz 72'; Gutiérrez 78'	Report	Gómez 58'	Stadium: Estádio José Alvalade; Attendance: 28,211; Referee: Manuel Gräfe (Germany)

==== Round of 32 ====
18 February 2016 1st leg	Sporting CP (Portugal)	0–1	(Germany) Bayer Leverkusen	Lisbon
21:05 CET (UTC+01:00)		Report	Bellarabi 26'	Stadium: Estádio José Alvalade; Attendance: 26,201; Referee: Björn Kuipers (Netherlands)

25 February 2016 2nd leg	Bayer Leverkusen (Germany)	3–1 (4–1 agg.)	(Portugal) Sporting CP	Leverkusen
19:00 CET (UTC+01:00)	Bellarabi 30', 65'; Çalhanoğlu 87'	Report	João Mário 38'	Stadium: BayArena; Attendance: 26,585; Referee: Ruddy Buquet (France)

== Squad statistics ==
As of match played 07 May 2016

Pos.	No.	Name	Super Taça		Primeira Liga		Taça de Portugal		Taça da Liga		Champions League		Europa League	
Pos.	No.	Name	Apps	Goals	Apps	Goals	Apps	Goals	Apps	Goals	Apps	Goals	Apps	Goals
GK	1	(Portugal) Rui Patrício	1 -	-	33 -	-	2 -	-	-	-	2 -	-	7 -	-
GK	22	(Brazil) Marcelo Boeck	-	-	1	-	1 -	-	2 -	-	-	-	1 - 1	-
GK	26	(Slovenia) Ažbe Jug	-	-	-	-	-	-	1 -	-	-	-	-	-
DF	3	(Argentina) Jonathan Silva	-	-	2 - 2	-	1 -	-	-	-	1 -	-	4 -	-
DF	4	(Brazil) Jefferson	1 -	-	18 -	-	2 -	-	1 -	-	1 -	-	4 -	-
DF	5	(Brazil) Ewerton	-	-	7 - 1	1	3 -	-	2 -	-	-	-	4 - 1	-
DF	13	(Uruguay) Sebastián Coates	-	-	12 -	-	-	-	-	-	-	-	-	-
DF	15	(Portugal) Paulo Oliveira	1 -	-	17 - 1	-	3 -	-	3 -	-	2 -	-	2 - 1	-
DF	44	(Brazil) Naldo	1 -	-	17 - 1	-	1	-	1 -	-	2 -	-	4 -	-
DF	47	(Portugal) Ricardo Esgaio	-	-	6 - 1	-	1	-	1 -	-	-	-	3 -	-
DF	55	(Portugal) Tobias Figueiredo	-	-	1 -	-	1	-	-	-	-	-	4 -	1
DF	21	(Portugal) João Pereira	1 -	-	17 - 2	-	3 -	-	-	-	2 -	-	5 -	-
DF	35	(Portugal) Rúben Semedo	1	-	12 - 1	-	-	-	-	-	-	-	1 -	-
DF	31	(Netherlands) Marvin Zeegelaar	-	-	9 - 2	-	-	-	2 -	1	-	-	-	-
MF	14	(Portugal) William Carvalho	-	-	24 - 2	2	3 -	1	1 -	-	-	-	4 - 1	-
MF	17	(Portugal) João Mário	1 -	-	30 - 2	6	2 -	-	2	-	2 -	-	4 - 1	1
MF	23	(Portugal) Adrien Silva	1 -	-	28 - 1	8	2 -	1	1 -	-	2 -	-	4 - 2	-
MF	28	(Portugal) André Martins	-	-	1	-	1	-	2 -	-	-	-	1 - 2	-
MF	2	(Italy) Ezequiel Schelotto	-	-	10 - 3	-	-	-	3 -	-	-	-	-	-
MF	6	(Italy) Alberto Aquilani	-	-	5 - 14	3	2 -	-	3 -	1	1 - 1	-	5 - 1	1
MF	11	(Brazil) Bruno César	-	-	12 - 3	4	-	-	1 -	-	-	-	1 -	-
MF	30	(Brazil) Bruno Paulista	-	-	1	-	1 -	1	-	-	-	-	2 -	-
FW	8	(Japan) Junya Tanaka	-	-	3	-	1	-	1 - 1	-	-	-	1 -	-
FW	9	(Algeria) Islam Slimani	1 -	-	32 -	26	2 -	2	1	-	1 - 1	1	1 - 6	1
FW	10	(Colombia) Fredy Montero	-	-	5 - 7	3	2 -	-	3 -	-	1	-	5 -	3
FW	18	(Peru) André Carrillo	1 -	-	4 -	1	-	-	-	-	2 -	-	-	-
FW	19	(Colombia) Teófilo Gutiérrez	1 -	1	19 - 3	10	-	-	1 -	-	2 -	2	4 - 1	1
FW	20	(Costa Rica) Bryan Ruiz	1 -	-	31 - 2	6	2 -	1	1	1	2 -	-	4 - 2	3
FW	29	(Argentina) Hernán Barcos	-	-	7	-	-	-	-	-	-	-	-	-
FW	36	(Portugal) Carlos Mané	1	-	2 - 9	1	1 -	-	1 - 1	-	2	-	6 -	-
FW	60	(Portugal) Gelson Martins	1	-	9 - 19	4	3	1	1 - 1	1	1	-	2 - 4	1
FW	73	(Brazil) Matheus Pereira	-	-	1 - 7	-	1 - 1	2	2 - 1	-	-	-	4 - 1	3

== Players ==
=== Current squad ===
Note: Flags indicate national team as defined under FIFA eligibility rules; some limited exceptions apply. Players may hold more than one non-FIFA nationality.

No.	Pos.	Nation	Player
1	GK	POR	Rui Patrício (Captain)
4	DF	BRA	Jefferson
9	FW	ALG	Islam Slimani
10	FW	COL	Fredy Montero
11	MF	ESP	Diego Capel
14	MF	POR	William Carvalho
15	DF	FRA	Naby Sarr
16	MF	POR	André Martins
17	MF	POR	João Mário
18	FW	PER	André Carrillo
19	FW	JPN	Junya Tanaka
20	FW	CRC	Bryan Ruiz
21	MF	POR	João Pereira

No.	Pos.	Nation	Player
22	GK	BRA	Marcelo Boeck (Vice-captain)
23	MF	POR	Adrien Silva
24	MF	ESP	Oriol Rosell
26	DF	POR	Paulo Oliveira
27	MF	SCO	Ryan Gauld
32	MF	BUL	Simeon Slavchev
33	DF	ARG	Jonathan Silva
36	FW	POR	Carlos Mané
41	DF	POR	Cédric
44	DF	BRA	Naldo
55	DF	POR	Tobias Figueiredo
60	MF	POR	Gelson Martins
73	MF	BRA	Matheus Pereira
81	DF	POR	André Geraldes

== Transfers ==
=== In ===
Note: Flags indicate national team as defined under FIFA eligibility rules; some limited exceptions apply. Players may hold more than one non-FIFA nationality.

No.	Pos.	Nation	Player
—	MF	BRA	XXX (to XXX) End of contract

=== Out ===
Note: Flags indicate national team as defined under FIFA eligibility rules; some limited exceptions apply. Players may hold more than one non-FIFA nationality.

No.	Pos.	Nation	Player
—	MF	BRA	XXX (to XXX) End of contract
