= 2015–16 Crystal Palace F.C. season =

English football club season

Crystal Palace
2015–16 season
- Owner: Steve Parish; David Blitzer; Josh Harris
- Chairman: Steve Parish
- Manager: Alan Pardew
- Stadium: Selhurst Park
- Premier League: 15th
- FA Cup: Runners-up
- League Cup: Fourth Round
- Cape Town Cup: Runners-up
- Top goalscorer: League: Yohan Cabaye; Scott Dann; Connor Wickham; Yannick Bolasie (5 goals each); All: Dwight Gayle (7)
- Highest home attendance: 25,295 vs Aston Villa
- Lowest home attendance: 23,714 vs Swansea City
- Average home league attendance: 24,649
Home colours	Away colours	Third colours

The 2015–16 season was Crystal Palace's third consecutive season in the Premier League and their 110th year in existence. The club participated in the Premier League, FA Cup and League Cup. They finished 15th in the Premier League and were runners-up in the FA Cup for the second time in their history. The season covers the period from 1 July 2015 to 30 June 2016.

== Competitions ==
=== Overview ===
Competition	Record							
Competition	G	W	D	L	GF	GA	GD	Win %
Premier League	38	11	9	18	39	51	−12	28.95
FA Cup	6	5	0	1	9	4	+5	83.33
League Cup	3	2	0	1	9	7	+2	66.67
Total	47	18	9	20	57	62	−5	38.30

Updated to match played 21 May 2016
Source: Competitions

=== Pre-season friendlies ===
On 28 May 2015, Crystal Palace announced their first pre-season friendly ahead of the 2015–16 season against Fulham. On 8 June 2015, a second fixture against Dagenham & Redbridge was added to the schedule. On 12 June 2015, Palace announced they will travel to Germany to play Union Berlin on 18 July 2015. A fourth friendly against Barnet was announced on 19 June 2015.

11 July 2015 Friendly	Barnet	3–5	Crystal Palace	Canons Park
15:00 BST	Akinde 2'; Gambin 64'; Lisbie 80'	Report	Gayle 3', 11', 50'; Allassani 76'; Campbell 83'	Stadium: The Hive Stadium; Attendance: 2,044

14 July 2015 Friendly	Sutton United	0–2	Crystal Palace XI	Sutton
19:45 BST		Report	Croll 29'; Anderson 53'	Stadium: Gander Green Lane

18 July 2015 Friendly	Union Berlin	2–0	Crystal Palace	Berlin, Germany
14:00 CEST	Skrzybski 57', 87'	Report		Stadium: Stadion An der Alten Försterei

1 August 2015 Friendly	Fulham	1–1	Crystal Palace	Fulham
15:00 BST	Pringle 6'	Report	Souaré 49'	Stadium: Craven Cottage

3 August 2015 Friendly	Dagenham & Redbridge	1–0	Crystal Palace	Dagenham
19:30 BST	McLean 75'	Report		Stadium: Victoria Road

=== Premier League ===
==== League table ====
Pos	Team	Pld	W	D	L	GF	GA	GD	Pts
13	Watford	38	12	9	17	40	50	−10	45
14	West Bromwich Albion	38	10	13	15	34	48	−14	43
15	Crystal Palace	38	11	9	18	39	51	−12	42
16	Bournemouth	38	11	9	18	45	67	−22	42
17	Sunderland	38	9	12	17	48	62	−14	39

Source: Barclays Premier League
Rules for classification: 1) Points; 2) Goal difference; 3) Goals scored; 4) Play-offs (only if needed to decide champion, teams for relegation or teams for UEFA competitions).

==== Results summary ====
Overall								Home						Away					
Pld	W	D	L	GF	GA	GD	Pts	W	D	L	GF	GA	GD	W	D	L	GF	GA	GD
38	11	9	18	39	51	−12	42	6	3	10	19	23	−4	5	6	8	20	28	−8

Last updated: 15 May 2016.
Source: Premier League

==== Results by matchday ====
Matchday	1	2	3	4	5	6	7	8	9	10	11	12	13	14	15	16	17	18	19	20	21	22	23	24	25	26	27	28	29	30	31	32	33	34	35	36	37	38
Ground	A	H	H	A	H	A	A	H	H	A	H	A	H	H	A	H	A	A	H	H	A	A	H	H	A	H	A	A	H	H	A	H	H	A	A	A	H	A
Result	W	L	W	W	L	L	W	W	L	L	D	W	L	W	D	W	W	D	D	L	L	L	L	L	D	L	L	D	L	L	D	W	D	D	L	L	W	L
Position	3	6	4	2	4	8	6	4	5	7	10	8	10	6	6	6	6	5	5	7	7	8	11	11	12	13	14	14	15	16	16	16	16	16	16	16	14	15

Updated to match(es) played on 15 May 2016. Source: Statto.com
A = Away; H = Home; W = Win; D = Draw; L = Loss

==== Matches ====
Win Draw Loss Postponed

The fixtures for the 2015–16 season were announced on 18 June 2015 at 9am.

8 August 2015 1	Norwich City	1–3	Crystal Palace	Norwich
15:00 BST	Tettey (yellow card) 23'; Redmond 69'	Report	Zaha 39'; Delaney 49'; Cabaye 90+4'	Stadium: Carrow Road; Attendance: 27,036; Referee: Simon Hooper

16 August 2015 2	Crystal Palace	1–2	Arsenal	Selhurst
13:30 BST	Ward 28'; McArthur (yellow card) 45+1'	Report	Giroud 16'; Coquelin (yellow card) 41'; Delaney 55' (o.g.)	Stadium: Selhurst Park; Attendance: 24,732; Referee: Lee Mason

22 August 2015 3	Crystal Palace	2–1	Aston Villa	Selhurst
15:00 BST	Ward (yellow card) 18'; Cabaye (yellow card) 50'; Dann 71'; Sako 87'; Puncheon (yellow card) 90'	Report	Gestede (yellow card) 55'; Souaré 77' (o.g.); Clark (yellow card) 84'; Bacuna (yellow card) 86'	Stadium: Selhurst Park; Attendance: 25,295; Referee: Keith Stroud

29 August 2015 4	Chelsea	1–2	Crystal Palace	Fulham
15:00 BST	Cahill (yellow card) 71'; Falcao 79'	Report	Sako 65'; Cabaye (yellow card) 73'; Ward 81'	Stadium: Stamford Bridge; Attendance: 41,581; Referee: Craig Pawson

12 September 2015 5	Crystal Palace	0–1	Manchester City	Selhurst
15:00 BST	Dann (yellow card) 17'; Hangeland (yellow card) 70'	Report	Touré (yellow card) 25'; Nasri (yellow card) 68'; Mangala (yellow card) 80'; Iheanacho 90'	Stadium: Selhurst Park; Attendance: 25,167; Referee: Mike Jones

20 September 2015 6	Tottenham Hotspur	1–0	Crystal Palace	Tottenham
13:30 BST	Son 68'; Lamela (yellow card) 76'	Report	Kelly (yellow card) 45'; Bolasie (yellow card) 62'	Stadium: White Hart Lane; Attendance: 35,723; Referee: Michael Oliver

27 September 2015 7	Watford	0–1	Crystal Palace	Watford
16:00 BST	Abdi (yellow card) 39'; Jurado (yellow card) 70'; Prödl (yellow card) 79'; Cathcart (yellow card) 82'	Report	Cabaye 71' (pen.), (yellow card) 76'; Puncheon (yellow card) 81'; Zaha (yellow card) 88'; Hennessey (yellow card) 90+4'	Stadium: Vicarage Road; Attendance: 20,168; Referee: Anthony Taylor

3 October 2015 8	Crystal Palace	2–0	West Bromwich Albion	Selhurst
12:45 BST	Souaré (yellow card) 25'; Bolasie 68'; Campbell (yellow card) 79'; Zaha (yellow card) 87'; Cabaye 89' (pen.)	Report	McClean (yellow card) 16'; Chester (yellow card) 61'; Yacob (yellow card) 87'	Stadium: Selhurst Park; Attendance: 24,033; Referee: Jonathan Moss

17 October 2015 9	Crystal Palace	1–3	West Ham United	Selhurst
15:00 BST	Cabaye 25' (pen.); Gayle (yellow card) 32' (yellow-red card) 44'; Jedinak (yellow card) 69'	Report	Tomkins (yellow card) 21'; Jenkinson 22'; Lanzini 88'; Jelavić (yellow card) 90+3'; Payet (yellow card) 40', (goal) 90+4'	Stadium: Selhurst Park; Attendance: 24,812; Referee: Mark Clattenburg

24 October 2015 10	Leicester City	1–0	Crystal Palace	Leicester
15:00 BST	Vardy 60', (yellow card) 90'; Simpson (yellow card) 65'; Schlupp (yellow card) 68'	Report	Zaha (yellow card) 87'	Stadium: King Power Stadium; Attendance: 31,752; Referee: Mike Dean

31 October 2015 11	Crystal Palace	0–0	Manchester United	Selhurst
15:00 GMT	Cabaye (yellow card) 18'; Kelly (yellow card) 26'; Gayle (yellow card) 80'	Report	Smalling (yellow card) 47'; Darmian (yellow card) 53'; Rojo (yellow card) 90+3'	Stadium: Selhurst Park; Attendance: 24,854; Referee: Mike Jones

8 November 2015 12	Liverpool	1–2	Crystal Palace	Liverpool
16:00 GMT	Coutinho 42'; Clyne (yellow card) 76'	Report	Bolasie 21'; Dann 82'; Puncheon (yellow card) 57'; Souaré (yellow card) 67'	Stadium: Anfield; Attendance: 44,115; Referee: Neil Swarbrick

23 November 2015 13	Crystal Palace	0–1	Sunderland	Selhurst
20:00 GMT	Dann (yellow card) 66'	Report	Jones (yellow card) 53'; M'Vila (yellow card) 67'; Defoe (yellow card) 57' (goal) 80'	Stadium: Selhurst Park; Attendance: 24,361; Referee: Martin Atkinson

28 November 2015 14	Crystal Palace	5–1	Newcastle United	Selhurst
15:00 GMT	McArthur 14', 90+3'; Bolasie 17', 47'; Zaha (yellow card) 38', (goal) 41'	Report	Cissé 10'; Mbemba (yellow card) 81'	Stadium: Selhurst Park; Attendance: 24,833; Referee: Stuart Attwell

7 December 2015 15	Everton	1–1	Crystal Palace	Liverpool
20:00 GMT	Lukaku 81'; Funes Mori (yellow card) 88'	Report	Wickham (yellow card) 54'; Dann 76'; McArthur (yellow card) 87'	Stadium: Goodison Park; Attendance: 35,736; Referee: Craig Pawson

12 December 2015 16	Crystal Palace	1–0	Southampton	Selhurst
15:00 GMT	Cabaye 38'	Report		Stadium: Selhurst Park; Attendance: 24,914; Referee: Mike Dean

19 December 2015 17	Stoke City	1–2	Crystal Palace	Stoke
15:00 GMT	Shaqiri (yellow card) 52'; Afellay (yellow card) 68'; Bojan 76' (pen.)	Report	Wickham 45+1' (pen.); Lee 88'	Stadium: Britannia Stadium; Attendance: 27,500; Referee: Robert Madley

26 December 2015 18	Bournemouth	0–0	Crystal Palace	Bournemouth
15:00 GMT	Arter (yellow card) 36'	Report		Stadium: Dean Court; Attendance: 11,218; Referee: Michael Oliver

28 December 2015 19	Crystal Palace	0–0	Swansea City	Selhurst
15:00 GMT	Cabaye (yellow card) 34'; Souaré (yellow card) 57'; Hangeland (yellow card) 90'	Report	Taylor (yellow card) 59'; Ki (yellow card) 65'	Stadium: Selhurst Park; Attendance: 23,714; Referee: Neil Swarbrick

3 January 2016 20	Crystal Palace	0–3	Chelsea	Selhurst
13:30 GMT	Delaney (yellow card) 13'; Jedinak (yellow card) 57'; Dann (yellow card) 80'	Report	Oscar 29'; Willian 60'; Costa 66'	Stadium: Selhurst Park; Attendance: 24,854; Referee: Kevin Friend

12 January 2016 21	Aston Villa	1–0	Crystal Palace	Birmingham
19:45 GMT	Lescott 29'; Veretout (yellow card) 68'; Gueye (yellow card) 80'	Report	Ward (yellow card) 79'	Stadium: Villa Park; Attendance: 28,245; Referee: Mark Clattenburg

16 January 2016 22	Manchester City	4–0	Crystal Palace	Manchester
15:00 GMT	Delph 22'; Agüero 41', 68'; Silva 84'	Report	Chamakh (yellow card) 71'; Cabaye (yellow card) 90'	Stadium: Etihad Stadium; Attendance: 53,983; Referee: Jonathan Moss

23 January 2016 23	Crystal Palace	1–3	Tottenham Hotspur	Selhurst
15:00 GMT	Vertonghen 30' (o.g.); McArthur (yellow card) 61'; Jedinak (yellow card) 90+3'	Report	Kane 63', (yellow card) 90+3'; Trippier (yellow card) 79'; Alli 84'; Chadli 90'	Stadium: Selhurst Park; Attendance: 24,867; Referee: Martin Atkinson

2 February 2016 24	Crystal Palace	1–2	Bournemouth	Selhurst
20:00 GMT	Dann 27', (yellow card) 51'; Zaha (yellow card) 43'; Jedinak (yellow card) 69'	Report	Pugh 34'; Afobe 57'; Francis (yellow card) 65'; Cook (yellow card) 76'; Smith (yellow card) 71'; Grabban (yellow card) 90+1'	Stadium: Selhurst Park; Attendance: 24,855; Referee: Mike Jones

6 February 2016 25	Swansea City	1–1	Crystal Palace	Swansea
15:00 GMT	Sigurðsson 13'; Fernández (yellow card) 75'	Report	Dann 47'; Delaney (yellow card) 54'; Jedinak (yellow card) 56'	Stadium: Liberty Stadium; Attendance: 20,492; Referee: Mike Dean

13 February 2016 26	Crystal Palace	1–2	Watford	Selhurst
15:00 GMT	Adebayor 45'; Souaré (red card) 90+4'	Report	Deeney 16' (pen.), 82'; Suárez (yellow card) 76'	Stadium: Selhurst Park; Attendance: 24,564; Referee: Robert Madley

27 February 2016 27	West Bromwich Albion	3–2	Crystal Palace	West Bromwich
17:30 GMT	Gardner 12'; Dawson (yellow card) 17', (goal) 20'; Berahino 31'; Chester (yellow card) 78'	Report	Adebayor (yellow card) 25'; Wickham 48', 80'; Cabaye (yellow card) 64'	Stadium: The Hawthorns; Attendance: 24,806; Referee: Jonathan Moss

1 March 2016 28	Sunderland	2–2	Crystal Palace	Sunderland
19:45 GMT	Rodwell (yellow card) 16'; N'Doye 36'; Borini 90'	Report	Dann (yellow card) 45+1'; Wickham 61', 67'	Stadium: Stadium of Light; Attendance: 39,795; Referee: Anthony Taylor

6 March 2016 29	Crystal Palace	1–2	Liverpool	Selhurst
13:30 GMT	Dann (yellow card) 11'; Ledley 48'	Report	Henderson (yellow card) 10'; Milner (yellow card) 40' (yellow-red card) 62'; Firmino 72'; Moreno (yellow card) 86'; Benteke 90+6' (pen.)	Stadium: Selhurst Park; Attendance: 24,709; Referee: Andre Marriner

19 March 2016 30	Crystal Palace	0–1	Leicester City	Selhurst
15:00 GMT	Souaré (yellow card) 42'	Report	Schmeichel (yellow card) 30'; Mahrez 34'	Stadium: Selhurst Park; Attendance: 25,041; Referee: Mike Jones

2 April 2016 31	West Ham United	2–2	Crystal Palace	London
15:00 BST	Lanzini 18'; Noble (yellow card) 28'; Reid (yellow card) 29'; Payet 41'; Kouyaté (red card) 67'	Report	Delaney 15'; Gayle 75'; Ward (yellow card) 90+1'; Sako (yellow card) 90+4'	Stadium: Boleyn Ground; Attendance: 34,857; Referee: Mark Clattenburg

9 April 2016 32	Crystal Palace	1–0	Norwich City	Selhurst
15:00 BST	Bolasie (yellow card) 21'; Puncheon 68'; Jedinak (yellow card) 70'	Report	Klose (yellow card) 37'	Stadium: Selhurst Park; Attendance: 24,960; Referee: Michael Oliver

13 April 2016 33	Crystal Palace	0–0	Everton	Selhurst
20:00 BST		Report	McCarthy (yellow card) 16' (yellow-red card) 52'; Barry (yellow card) 90+1'	Stadium: Selhurst Park; Attendance: 23,528; Referee: Mike Jones

17 April 2016 34	Arsenal	1–1	Crystal Palace	Holloway
16:00 BST	Sánchez 45+1'	Report	Ledley (yellow card) 57'; Dann (yellow card) 63'; Bolasie 81'	Stadium: Emirates Stadium; Attendance: 59,961; Referee: Roger East

20 April 2016 35	Manchester United	2–0	Crystal Palace	Manchester
20:00 BST	Delaney 4' (o.g.); Darmian 55' (yellow card) 62'	Report	Kelly (yellow card) 6'; Souaré (yellow card) 43'	Stadium: Old Trafford; Attendance: 75,277; Referee: Lee Mason

30 April 2016 36	Newcastle United	1–0	Crystal Palace	Newcastle upon Tyne
15:00 BST	Mbemba (yellow card) 6'; Townsend 58'; Colback (yellow card) 66'	Report		Stadium: St James' Park; Attendance: 52,107; Referee: Mike Dean

7 May 2016 37	Crystal Palace	2–1	Stoke City	Selhurst
15:00 BST	McArthur (yellow card) 33'; Gayle 58', 68'; Souare (yellow card) 90'	Report	Whelan (yellow card) 3'; Pieters (yellow card) 21'; Adam 26'; Ireland (yellow card) 87'	Stadium: Selhurst Park; Attendance: 23,990; Referee: Kevin Friend

15 May 2016 38	Southampton	4–1	Crystal Palace	Southampton
15:00 BST	Mané 43'; Pellè 61' (yellow card) 72'; Bertrand 75' (pen.); Davis 87'	Report	Ward (yellow card) 54'; McArthur (yellow card) 59'; Puncheon 64'	Stadium: St Mary's Stadium; Attendance: 31,313; Referee: Michael Oliver

=== FA Cup ===
In the third round of the 2015–16 FA Cup, Crystal Palace were drawn to play away against fellow Premier League side Southampton on 9 January 2016. At St Mary's Stadium, Crystal Palace won 2–1 with goals from Joel Ward and Wilfried Zaha. In the fourth round, they were drawn at home against Premier League Stoke City. At Crystal Palace's Selhurst Park, they won 1–0 with a goal from Zaha. in the fifth round they were drawn away at Premier League Tottenham Hotspur. At White Hart Lane, Crystal Palace won 1–0 with a goal from Martin Kelly. In the quarter final, Crystal Palace were drawn away at Football League Championship team Reading. At the Madjeski Stadium, Crystal Palace won 2–0 with goals from Yohan Cabaye and Fraizer Campbell to reach the semi-final for the first time in 21 years. Crystal Palace drew Premier League Watford in the Wembley semi-final, in a repeat of the 2013 Football League Championship play-off final. Crystal Palace won 2–1 due to goals from Yannick Bolasie and Connor Wickham. In the final, Crystal Palace opened the scoring through Jason Puncheon after 78 minutes, though Juan Mata equalised for Manchester United within 3 minutes to send the game to extra-time. Although United had Chris Smalling sent off, Palace could not force a winner, instead conceding the winning goal to Jesse Lingard with 10 minutes left.

9 January 2016 Third round	Southampton	1–2	Crystal Palace	Southampton
15:00 GMT	Romeu 51'; Mané (yellow card) 82'; Long (yellow card) 86'	Report	Ward 29'; Zaha 68'; Ledley (yellow card) 90+7'	Stadium: St Mary's Stadium; Attendance: 30,763; Referee: Lee Mason

30 January 2016 Fourth round	Crystal Palace	1–0	Stoke City	Selhurst
15:00 GMT	Zaha 17'; Puncheon (yellow card)	Report	Wilson (yellow card) 30'; Wollscheid (yellow card) 80'	Stadium: Selhurst Park; Attendance: 17,062; Referee: Mark Clattenburg

21 February 2016 Fifth round	Tottenham Hotspur	0–1	Crystal Palace	Tottenham
15:00 GMT	Rose (yellow card) 90+2'	Report	Kelly 45+1'; Cabaye (yellow card) 73'; Bolasie (yellow card) 85'	Stadium: White Hart Lane; Attendance: 35,547; Referee: Craig Pawson

11 March 2016 Sixth round	Reading	0–2	Crystal Palace	Reading
19:55 GMT	Hector (yellow card) 30'; Gunter (yellow card) 58'; Cooper (yellow card) 68' (yellow-red card) 85'	Report	Zaha (yellow card) 58'; Bolasie (yellow card) 62'; Cabaye 86' (pen.); Jedinak (yellow card) 89'; Campbell 90+4'	Stadium: Madejski Stadium; Attendance: 23,110; Referee: Mike Dean

24 April 2016 Semi-final	Crystal Palace	2–1	Watford	London
16:00 BST	Bolasie 6'; Dann (yellow card) 54'; Wickham 61'	Report	Jurado (yellow card) 38'; Deeney 55' (yellow card) 89'; Suárez (yellow card) 79'	Stadium: Wembley Stadium; Attendance: 79,110; Referee: Craig Pawson

21 May 2016 Final	Crystal Palace	1–2 (a.e.t.)	Manchester United	London
17:30 BST	Puncheon 78'	Report	Mata 81'; Lingard 110'	Stadium: Wembley Stadium; Attendance: 88,619; Referee: Mark Clattenburg

=== League Cup ===
Crystal Palace entered the competition in the second round and were drawn at home against Shrewsbury Town. The third round draw was made on 25 August 2015 live on Sky Sports by Charlie Nicholas and Phil Thompson. Palace were drawn at home to Charlton Athletic.

25 August 2015 Second round	Crystal Palace	4–1 (a.e.t.)	Shrewsbury Town	Selhurst
19:45 BST	Gayle 41' (pen.); Murray 95' (pen.); Lee 97'; Zaha 114'	Report	Tootle 9'	Stadium: Selhurst Park; Attendance: 10,978; Referee: Darren Bond

23 September 2015 Third round	Crystal Palace	4–1	Charlton Athletic	Selhurst
19:45 BST	Campbell 51'; Gayle 59' (pen.), 74' (pen.), 86'	Report	Sarr 65'; Diarra (red card) 73'	Stadium: Selhurst Park; Attendance: 16,576; Referee: Neil Swarbrick

28 October 2015 Fourth round	Manchester City	5–1	Crystal Palace	Manchester
21:45 BST	Bony 22'; De Bruyne 44'; Kolarov (yellow card) 50'; Iheanacho 59'; Touré 76' (pen.); García 90+4'	Report	Zaha (yellow card) 80'; Delaney 89'	Stadium: Etihad Stadium; Attendance: 40,585

=== Cape Town Cup ===
24 July 2015 Semi-final	Supersport United	0–4	Crystal Palace	Green Point, South Africa
17:45 SAST	Jedinak 3'; Lee 17'; Mutch 29'; Campbell 34'	Report		Stadium: Cape Town Random

26 July 2015 Final	Crystal Palace	0–2	Sporting CP	Green Point, South Africa
17:45 SAST		Report	Montero 70', 86'	Stadium: Cape Town Stadium

== Transfers ==
=== Transfers in ===
Date from	Position	Nationality	Name	From	Fee	Ref.
10 July 2015	CM	FRA	Yohan Cabaye	Paris Saint-Germain	£10,000,000	
23 July 2015	GK	ENG	Alex McCarthy	Queens Park Rangers	£3,500,000	
3 August 2015	ST	ENG	Connor Wickham	Sunderland	£7,000,000	
5 August 2015	LW	MLI	Bakary Sako	Wolverhampton Wanderers	Free transfer	
3 January 2016	LW	ENG	Randell Williams	Tower Hamlets	Free transfer	
26 January 2016	ST	TOG	Emmanuel Adebayor	Free agent	Free transfer	
30 March 2016	ST	ENG	Freddie Ladapo	Margate	Undisclosed	

Total spending: ▼£22,500,000

=== Loan in ===
Date from	Position	Nationality	Name	From	Date until	Ref.
21 July 2015	CF	ENG	Patrick Bamford	Chelsea	4 January 2016	

=== Transfers out ===
Date from	Position	Nationality	Name	To	Fee	Ref.
1 July 2015	CF	NGA	Shola Ameobi	Bolton Wanderers	Free transfer	(Note: Following Ameobi's release he joined Bolton Wanderers.)
1 July 2015	CM	ENG	Sonny Black	Free agent	Released	
1 July 2015	CB	ENG	Michael Chambers	Welling United	Free transfer	(Note: Following Chambers' release he joined Welling United.)
1 July 2015	CM	ENG	Shawniki Clement-Peter	Free agent	Released	
1 July 2015	GK	ENG	Bradley Comins	Free agent	Released	
1 July 2015	AM	ENG	Kyle De Silva	Notts County	Free transfer	(Note: Following De Silva's release he joined Notts County.)
1 July 2015	SS	SCO	Stephen Dobbie	Bolton Wanderers	Free transfer	(Note: Following Dobbie's release he joined Bolton Wanderers.)
1 July 2015	RB	ENG	Mandela Egbo	Borussia Mönchengladbach	Undisclosed	
1 July 2015	CF	ENG	Morgan Ferrier	Free agent	Released	
1 July 2015	AM	IRL	Owen Garvan	Colchester United	Released	(Note: Following Garvan's release he joined Colchester United.)
1 July 2015	CB	ENG	Jahmal Howlett-Mundle	Heart of Midlothian	Free transfer	
1 July 2015	RW	ENG	Elliott List	Gillingham	Released	
1 July 2015	CM	ENG	Kiye Martin	Free agent	Released	
1 July 2015	GK	WAL	Lewis Price	Sheffield Wednesday	Free transfer	(Note: Following Price's release he joined Sheffield Wednesday.)
1 July 2015	CB	ENG	Peter Ramage	Kerala Blasters	Released	(Note: Following Ramage's release he joined Kerala Blasters.)
1 July 2015	CM	ENG	Ghassimu Sow	Free agent	Released	
1 July 2015	LW	ENG	Jerome Thomas	Free agent	Released	
31 August 2015	CM	SCO	Barry Bannan	Sheffield Wednesday	Undisclosed	
1 September 2015	CM	ALG	Adlène Guedioura	Watford	Undisclosed	
1 September 2015	CF	ENG	Glenn Murray	Bournemouth	£4,000,000	
25 September 2015	CF	ENG	Fisayo Adarabioyo	Macclesfield Town	Free transfer	
13 January 2016	RB	ENG	Jack Hunt	Sheffield Wednesday	Undisclosed	

=== Loans out ===
Date from	Position	Nationality	Name	To	Date until	Ref.
3 July 2015	RB	ENG	Jack Hunt	Sheffield Wednesday	13 January 2016	
23 July 2015	CM	ENG	Hiram Boateng	Plymouth Argyle	2 January 2016	
27 July 2015	CB	ENG	Ryan Inniss	Port Vale	End of season	
30 July 2015	LB	ENG	Jerome Binnom-Williams	Burton Albion	End of season	
14 August 2015	GK	SCO	Chris Kettings	Stevenage	12 September 2015	
20 August 2015	LB	ENG	Christian Scales	Crawley Town	2 January 2016	
10 September 2015	AM	WAL	Jonny Williams	Nottingham Forest	2 January 2016	
17 September 2015	CF	ENG	Sullay Kaikai	Shrewsbury Town	23 December 2015	
18 September 2015	GK	SCO	Chris Kettings	Bromley	16 October 2015	
5 November 2015	MF	ENG	Jake Gray	Hartlepool United	5 December 2015 (Note: Later extended to January and then to the end of the season.)	
22 January 2016	AM	WAL	Jonny Williams	Milton Keynes Dons	End of season	
1 March 2016	CF	ENG	Sullay Kaikai	Shrewsbury Town	3 May 2016	
23 March 2016	CM	ENG	Hiram Boateng	Plymouth Argyle	End of season	

== Player statistics ==
=== Appearances and goals ===
As of 21 May 2016

No.	Pos	Nat	Player	Total		Premier League		FA Cup		League Cup	
No.	Pos	Nat	Player	Apps	Goals	Apps	Goals	Apps	Goals	Apps	Goals
1	GK	(Argentina) ARG	Julián Speroni	2	0	2	0	0	0	0	0
2	DF	(England) ENG	Joel Ward	38	3	30	2	6	1	1+1	0
3	DF	(Jamaica) JAM	Adrian Mariappa	7	0	3	0	0+1	0	3	0
4	DF	(Norway) NOR	Brede Hangeland	9	0	7	0	0	0	1+1	0
6	DF	(England) ENG	Scott Dann	42	5	35	5	6	0	1	0
7	MF	(France) FRA	Yohan Cabaye	40	6	32+1	5	6	1	0+1	0
8	FW	(England) ENG	Patrick Bamford (on loan from Chelsea)	9	0	0+6	0	0	0	2+1	0
9	FW	(England) ENG	Fraizer Campbell	15	2	4+7	0	2+1	1	1	1
10	MF	(Democratic Republic of the Congo) COD	Yannick Bolasie	31	6	23+3	5	3+1	1	1	0
11	MF	(England) ENG	Wilfried Zaha	43	5	30+4	2	6	2	3	1
12	GK	(England) ENG	Alex McCarthy	7	0	7	0	0	0	0	0
13	GK	(Wales) WAL	Wayne Hennessey	38	0	29	0	6	0	3	0
14	MF	(South Korea) KOR	Lee Chung-yong	17	2	4+9	1	1	0	2+1	1
15	MF	(Australia) AUS	Mile Jedinak	35	0	16+11	0	3+3	0	2	0
16	FW	(England) ENG	Dwight Gayle	20	7	8+8	3	0+1	0	2+1	4
17	FW	(England) ENG	Glenn Murray	3	1	2	0	0	0	0+1	1
18	MF	(Scotland) SCO	James McArthur	31	2	26+2	2	1+1	0	1	0
20	MF	(Wales) WAL	Jonny Williams	1	0	0+1	0	0	0	0	0
21	FW	(England) ENG	Connor Wickham	24	6	15+6	5	3	1	0	0
22	MF	(England) ENG	Jordon Mutch	25	0	7+13	0	2+1	0	1+1	0
23	DF	(Senegal) SEN	Pape Souaré	41	0	34	0	5	0	1+1	0
25	FW	(Togo) TOG	Emmanuel Adebayor	15	1	7+5	1	2+1	0	0	0
26	MF	(Mali) MLI	Bakary Sako	23	2	11+9	2	0+3	0	0	0
27	DF	(Republic of Ireland) IRL	Damien Delaney	40	3	32	2	6	0	2	1
28	MF	(Wales) WAL	Joe Ledley	26	1	11+8	1	4	0	3	0
29	FW	(Morocco) MAR	Marouane Chamakh	12	0	1+9	0	0+2	0	0	0
34	DF	(England) ENG	Martin Kelly	17	1	11+2	0	1	1	3	0
38	MF	(England) ENG	Hiram Boateng	1	0	0+1	0	0	0	0	0
42	MF	(England) ENG	Jason Puncheon	35	3	31	2	3+1	1	0	0
43	MF	(England) ENG	Sullay Kaikai	1	0	0+1	0	0	0	0	0

=== Goalscorers ===
As of 21 May 2016

No.	Pos.	Name	Premier League	FA Cup	League Cup	Total
16	FW	Dwight Gayle	3	0	4	7
7	MF	Yohan Cabaye	5	1	0	6
21	FW	Connor Wickham	5	1	0	6
10	MF	Yannick Bolasie	5	1	0	6
6	DF	Scott Dann	5	0	0	5
11	MF	Wilfried Zaha	2	2	1	5
2	DF	Joel Ward	2	1	0	3
42	MF	Jason Puncheon	2	1	0	3
27	DF	Damien Delaney	2	0	1	3
26	MF	Bakary Sako	2	0	0	2
18	MF	James McArthur	2	0	0	2
14	MF	Lee Chung-yong	1	0	1	2
9	FW	Fraizer Campbell	0	1	1	2
25	FW	Emmanuel Adebayor	1	0	0	1
28	MF	Joe Ledley	1	0	0	1
34	DF	Martin Kelly	0	1	0	1
17	FW	Glenn Murray	0	0	1	1
–	–	Own Goal	1	0	0	1
Total			36	8	9	53

=== Disciplinary record ===
As of 21 May 2016

No.	Pos.	Name	Premier League		FA Cup		League Cup		Total	
No.	Pos.	Name	Yellow card	Red card	Yellow card	Red card	Yellow card	Red card	Yellow card	Red card
7	MF	Yohan Cabaye	7	0	1	0	0	0	8	0
6	DF	Scott Dann	7	0	2	0	0	0	9	0
23	DF	Pape Souaré	6	1	0	0	1	0	7	1
15	MF	Mile Jedinak	6	0	1	0	0	0	7	0
11	MF	Wilfried Zaha	5	0	1	0	1	0	7	0
18	MF	James McArthur	5	0	1	0	0	0	6	0
2	DF	Joel Ward	4	0	0	0	0	0	4	0
42	MF	Jason Puncheon	3	0	1	0	0	0	4	0
34	DF	Martin Kelly	3	0	0	0	0	0	3	0
10	MF	Yannick Bolasie	2	0	2	0	0	0	4	0
9	FW	Fraizer Campbell	1	0	0	0	1	0	2	0
16	FW	Dwight Gayle	1	1	0	0	0	0	1	1
4	DF	Brede Hangeland	2	0	0	0	0	0	2	0
13	GK	Wayne Hennessey	1	0	0	0	0	0	1	0
21	FW	Connor Wickham	1	0	0	0	0	0	1	0
27	DF	Damien Delaney	2	0	1	0	0	0	3	0
28	MF	Joe Ledley	1	0	1	0	0	0	2	0
29	FW	Marouane Chamakh	1	0	0	0	0	0	1	0
25	FW	Emmanuel Adebayor	1	0	0	0	0	0	1	0
26	MF	Bakary Sako	1	0	0	0	0	0	1	0
Total			58	2	8	0	3	0	69	2
