= 2016 FA Cup final =

English association football match

2016 FA Cup Final
- The match was played at Wembley Stadium.
- Event: 2015–16 FA Cup
Crystal Palace	Manchester United
1	2
- After extra time
- Date: 21 May 2016
- Venue: Wembley Stadium, London
- Man of the Match: Wayne Rooney (Manchester United)
- Referee: Mark Clattenburg (County Durham)
- Attendance: 88,619

The 2016 FA Cup final was an association football match between Crystal Palace and Manchester United on 21 May 2016 at Wembley Stadium in London, England, organised by the Football Association (FA). It marked the 135th final of the Football Association Challenge Cup (FA Cup) and was the showpiece match of English football's primary cup competition. It was Manchester United's first FA Cup final appearance since 2007, when they lost 1–0 to Chelsea. Crystal Palace were playing their second FA Cup final, the previous occasion being in 1990, when they lost to Manchester United after a replay following a 3–3 draw in the first match.

Mark Clattenburg, from Consett, County Durham, was the referee for the match, which was played in front of 88,619 spectators. The first half was goalless although Clattenburg was the subject of some controversy when he awarded Crystal Palace a free kick instead of playing advantage after Manchester United's Chris Smalling was adjudged to have fouled Connor Wickham. After coming on as a second-half substitute, Jason Puncheon gave Crystal Palace the lead when he scored from close range past David de Gea in the Manchester United goal. The lead lasted three minutes before Juan Mata's deflected volley beat Wayne Hennessey, the Crystal Palace goalkeeper. Regular time ended with a scoreline of 1–1, sending the final into extra time. Just before the interval in the additional period, Smalling was sent off after receiving a second yellow card, becoming the fourth player to be dismissed in an FA Cup final. Jesse Lingard, who had been brought on to replace Mata close to the end of regular time, then shot from distance, sending the ball into the top corner of the Crystal Palace goal to give Manchester United a 2–1 victory, and their twelfth FA Cup.

Manchester United's Wayne Rooney was named as man of the match. The victory was Louis van Gaal's only trophy as Manchester United's manager and he was sacked two days after the final, to be replaced by José Mourinho. By winning the final, Manchester United qualified for both the 2016 FA Community Shield and the group stage of the 2016–17 UEFA Europa League.

== Background ==
The FA Cup is an annual knockout tournament involving professional and amateur men's football clubs in the English football league system. It is the world's oldest football cup competition. The 2016 final was the 135th final to be played since it was first held in 1872.

In the two league matches between the sides during the regular season, the fixture at Selhurst Park in London in October 2015 ended in a goalless draw while the game at Old Trafford the following April ended in a 2–0 victory to Manchester United. Crystal Palace's top scorer during the regular season was Dwight Gayle who had scored 7 goals in 11 appearances in all competitions, while three players – Yannick Bolasie, Yohan Cabaye and Connor Wickham – had 6 each. Anthony Martial was Manchester United's leading scorer, with 17 goals, including 2 in the FA Cup, followed by Wayne Rooney on 15 (also 2 in the FA Cup). Manchester United went into the final with a record of 11 wins from 18 FA Cup finals, one behind Arsenal in both FA Cup wins and FA Cup Final appearances. United last played a final in 2007, the first at the new Wembley, where they lost 1–0 after extra time to Chelsea. Their last title victory was in 2004, a 3–0 win against Millwall at Cardiff's Millennium Stadium. Crystal Palace's only previous FA Cup final was the 1990 final, which they lost to Manchester United after a replay when the first match had ended in a 3–3 draw.

== Route to the final ==
=== Crystal Palace ===
Crystal Palace's route to the final
Round	Opposition	Score
3rd	Southampton (A)	2–1
4th	Stoke City (H)	1–0
5th	Tottenham Hotspur (A)	1–0
6th	Reading (A)	2–0
SF	Watford (N)	2–1
Key: (H) = Home venue; (A) = Away venue; (N) = Neutral venue.

As a Premier League team, Crystal Palace started their campaign in the third round. There, they were drawn against fellow Premier League team Southampton away at St Mary's Stadium on 9 January 2016. Crystal Palace took the lead when Joel Ward scored in the 29th minute from a Jason Puncheon pass. Six minutes after half time, Oriol Romeu equalised for Southampton following Cuco Martina's saved shot. Midway through the second half, Wilfried Zaha restored Crystal Palace's lead, scoring with a volley after the Southampton goalkeeper Maarten Stekelenburg had kept out Puncheon's shot. No further goals were scored and the match ended 2–1 to Crystal Palace. In the fourth round, Crystal Palace hosted another top-flight team in Stoke City at Selhurst Park on 30 January. Zaha scored in the first half after beating the Stoke City defence, striking the ball past Jakob Haugaard for the only goal of the game. The visiting side had made eight changes to their team from their previous league match, prompting their manager Mark Hughes to say "We were a little bit stretched, we had a number of players unavailable."

In the fifth round, Crystal Palace were drawn against their third consecutive Premier League opposition, meeting Tottenham Hotspur on 21 February away at White Hart Lane. Although Tottenham Hotspur had a number of chances to score, including two shots from Harry Kane which were saved by Wayne Hennessey and Dele Alli striking both goalposts with a shot, Crystal Palace secured a 1–0 victory. Martin Kelly scored his first goal since 2011 in first-half stoppage time from close range after receiving the ball from Zaha. The win meant Crystal Palace advanced to the quarter-finals of the FA Cup for the first time since the 1994–95 competition. There, they had their first game against a lower-division team, facing Championship side Reading at the Madejski Stadium on 11 March. Although Crystal Palace dominated possession, the first half ended goalless. With five minutes of the game remaining, Reading defender Jake Cooper was sent off after receiving a second yellow card, fouling Bolasie and conceding a penalty which was scored by Cabaye. Fraizer Campbell secured the win with a goal from close range four minutes into stoppage time. Crystal Palace won 2–0 and progressed to the semi-final for the first time in 21 years.

On 24 April, Crystal Palace faced Watford at Wembley Stadium, a neutral venue, in a repeat of the 2013 Football League Championship play-off final. Bolasie gave Crystal Palace an early lead when he headed the ball into the Watford goal after Damien Delaney flicked on a corner from Cabaye. Watford's Étienne Capoue was stretchered off the pitch in the 30th minute following a tangle with Bolasie. Ten minutes into the second half, Troy Deeney equalised for Watford when he scored with a header from José Manuel Jurado's corner. Six minutes later, Crystal Palace retook the lead when Wickham converted Pape Souaré's cross to make it 2–1 which remained the final score.

=== Manchester United ===
Manchester United's route to the final
Round	Opposition	Score
3rd	Sheffield United (H)	1–0
4th	Derby County (A)	3–1
5th	Shrewsbury Town (A)	3–0
6th Replay	West Ham United (H); West Ham United (A)	1–1; 2–1
SF	Everton (N)	2–1
Key: (H) = Home venue; (A) = Away venue; (N) = Neutral venue.

As a Premier League team, Manchester United also entered 2015–16 FA Cup in the third round, hosting Sheffield United of League One at Old Trafford on 9 January 2016. Substitute Memphis Depay was fouled in second-half stoppage time by Dean Hammond for a penalty kick, from which Rooney scored the only goal of the match. Manager Louis van Gaal was under pressure for Manchester United's poor form prior to the match. In the fourth round, Manchester United travelled to Pride Park to play Derby County who were in a play-off place in the Championship. Rooney scored the first goal in the 16th minute from outside the penalty area, but George Thorne equalised eight minutes before half time. Midway though the second half, Daley Blind restored Manchester United's lead, scoring with a low strike from Jesse Lingard's cross. Juan Mata's 83rd-minute goal after a run from Martial secured a 3–1 victory for Manchester United and relieved Van Gaal of further pressure; it was the first time in 15 games that the team won by a margin of more than one goal.

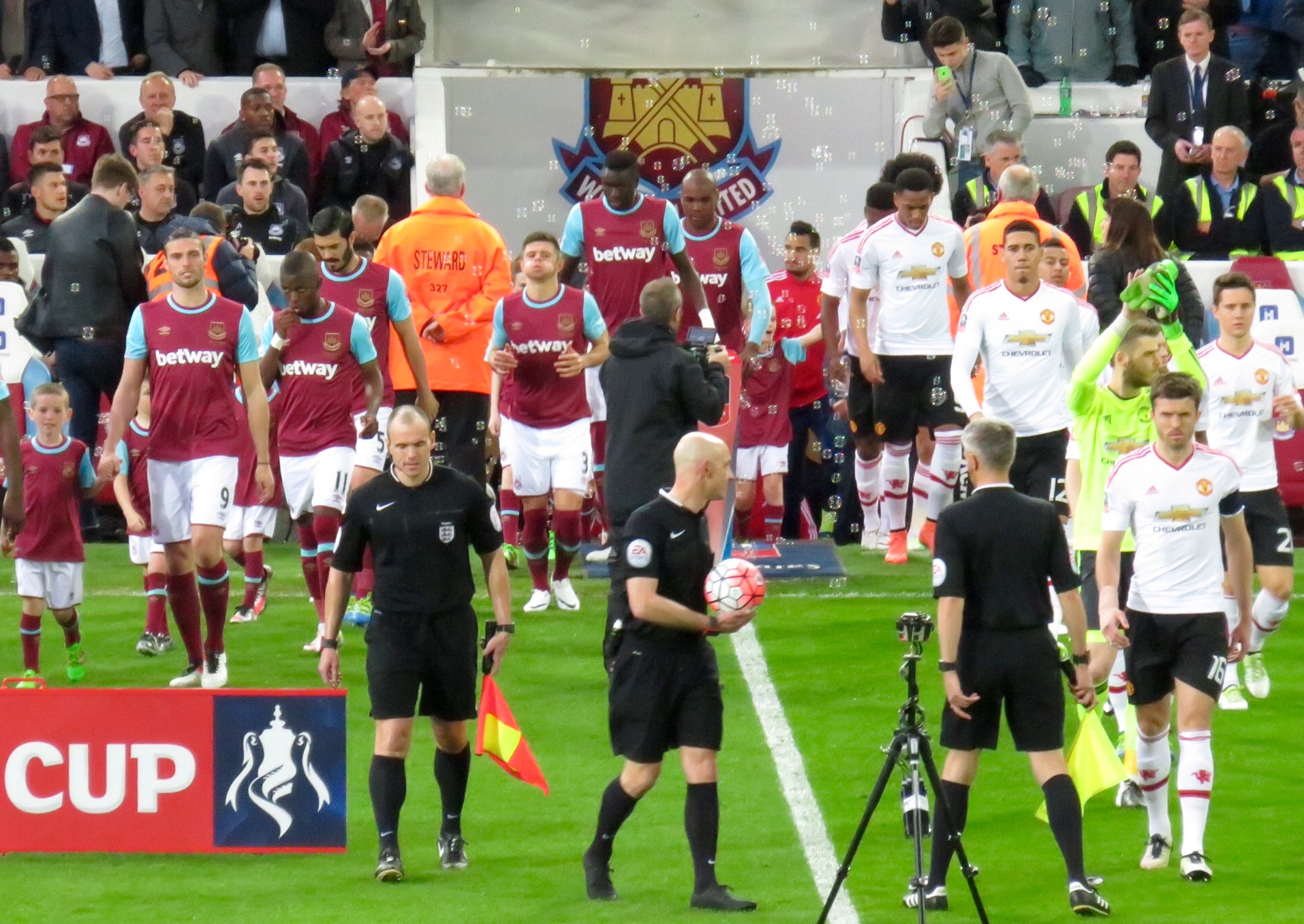
West Ham United and Manchester United players entering the field for their FA Cup replay

On 22 February, Manchester United played the fifth round against Shrewsbury Town, who were in 21st position in League One, away at New Meadow. Chris Smalling opened the scoring for Manchester United with his first goal in the FA Cup eight minutes before half-time. Mata doubled their advantage in first-half stoppage time with a direct free kick before Lingard confirmed a 3–0 win just after the hour mark, converting Ander Herrera's pass. Manchester United were forced to play with only ten players for the final fourteen minutes of the match after Will Keane came off injured and no substitutes remained. Manchester United hosted their sixth-round match against top-flight opponents West Ham United on 13 March. The visitors took the lead midway through the second half after Dimitri Payet's 30-yard (27 m) free kick beat David de Gea in the Manchester United goal. With seven minutes remaining, the hosts equalised when Martial scored from a cross from Herrera, ending the match 1–1. Due to the draw, a replay was required. This took place the following month at the Boleyn Ground, the final FA Cup match at the ground. After a goalless first half, Marcus Rashford gave Manchester United the lead in the 54th minute when he curled a shot past Darren Randolph, the West Ham United goalkeeper, into the top corner of the net. Marouane Fellaini made it 2–0 midway through the second half, scoring from Martial's cross. West Ham halved the deficit in the 79th minute when James Tomkins scored with a header. Although West Ham dominated the closing stages, including having a goal by Cheikhou Kouyaté disallowed, the match ended 2–1 to Manchester United.

On 23 April, Manchester United faced Everton at Wembley, a neutral venue, in the semi-finals. Fellaini gave Manchester United the lead in the 34th minute when he scored from close range against his former team. After the interval, Timothy Fosu-Mensah fouled Everton's Ross Barkley, but de Gea saved Romelu Lukaku's subsequent penalty kick. With 15 minutes to go, Everton substitute Gerard Deulofeu sent in a cross which was deflected into Manchester United's goal off Smalling for an own goal which levelled the score. Three minutes into stoppage time, Herrera set up Martial who struck the ball past the Everton goalkeeper Joel Robles to secure a 2–1 win for Manchester United and progression to a record-breaking 19th FA Cup final.

A bomb scare at Old Trafford on the final day of the Premier League on 15 May caused Manchester United's final league game, against Bournemouth, to be postponed and rearranged for 17 May. This left United with three days to prepare for the final, two days fewer than Palace.

== Match ==
=== Pre-match ===
The referee for the final was Mark Clattenburg from Consett, County Durham, who was assisted by John Brooks and Andrew Halliday. The fourth official was Neil Swarbrick while Michael Salisbury acted as the reserve assistant referee. The match was broadcast live in the United Kingdom by both the BBC, providing free-to-air coverage on Match of the Day, and BT Sport acting as the pay TV alternative. Each club received an allocation of 28,780 tickets. This was an increase on previous seasons from 71% of available seats for supporters of the two opposing teams to 80%. All ticket prices were also reduced by £5 each. An inaugural tournament was held on 7 May in which a fan of each of the 64 teams who reached the third round competed in a knock-out football video game tournament in rooms around Wembley Stadium. The prize was tickets to the actual final. The financial prize for winning the FA Cup Final was £1.8 million while the runners-up would receive £900,000. Manchester United were considered clear favourites to win the final, both in the media and by bookmakers.

Ahead of kick-off, Tinie Tempah performed alongside The Lewisham and Greenwich NHS Trust Choir before the sides were presented to Prince William, Duke of Cambridge. The national anthem was sung by Karen Harding. Van Gaal made two changes to his starting line-up from the side that competed in his side's previous match, the last league game against Bournemouth: Marcos Rojo and Fellaini came in for Cameron Borthwick-Jackson and Lingard, the latter dropping to the substitutes' bench. Crystal Palace's manager Alan Pardew recalled six players to his starting eleven: Zaha, Hennessey, Scott Dann, Bolasie, Cabaye and Wickham returned while Puncheon and Gayle were listed as substitutes. Manchester United lined up in a 4–1–4–1 formation with Michael Carrick playing as a defensive midfielder and Rashford the sole striker. Their opposition adopted a 4–2–3–1 formation, with Wickham playing up front on his own.

=== Summary ===
==== First half ====
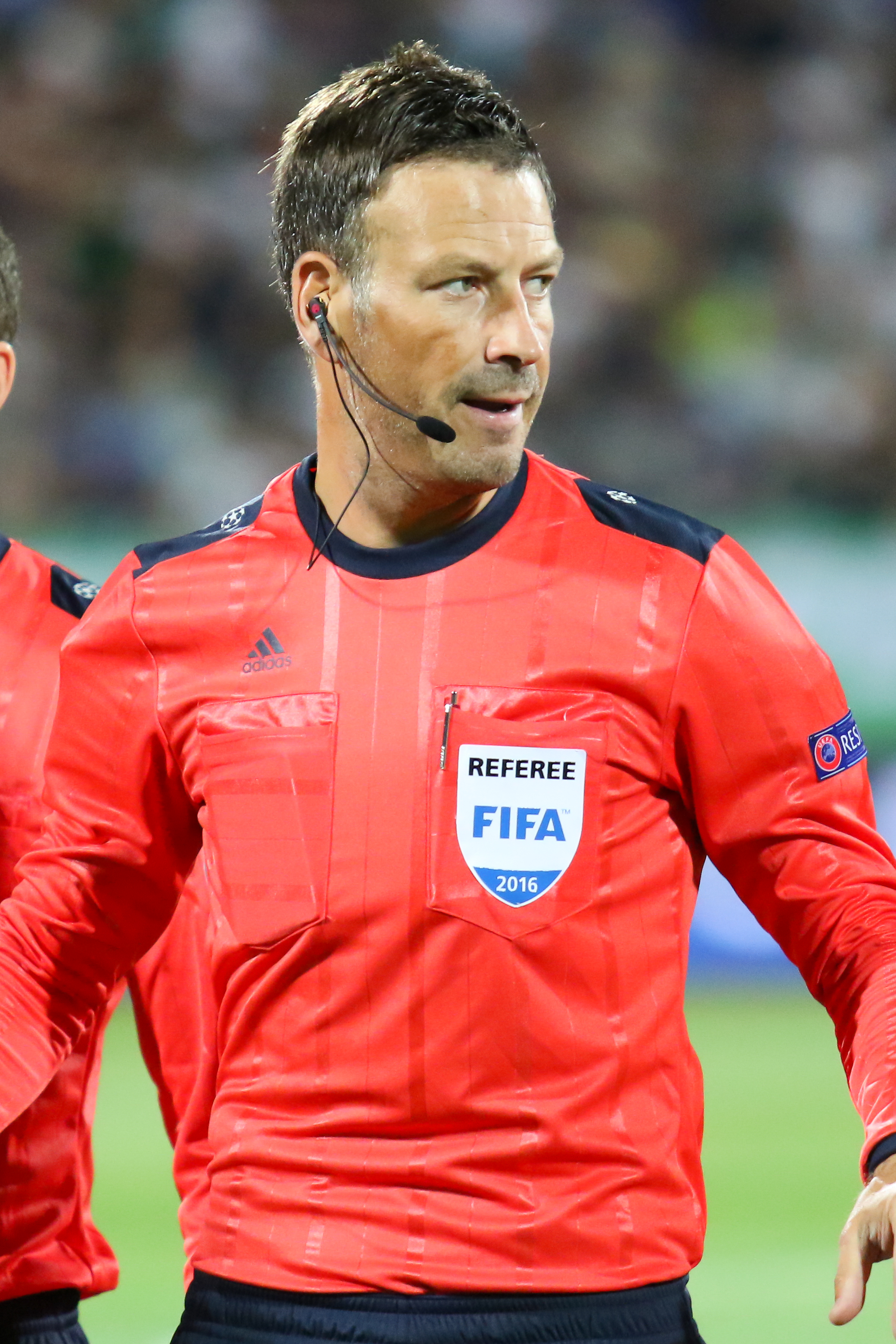
Mark Clattenburg was the match referee.

After a slight delay resulting from the overrunning pre-match entertainment, Crystal Palace kicked off around 5:30 p.m. on 21 May 2016 in front of 88,619 spectators. In the third minute, Crystal Palace won the first corner of the match but Cabaye's set piece was easily caught by de Gea. Manchester United won their first corner four minutes later, and Mata's eventual cross was cleared by Mile Jedinak ahead of Fellaini. This was followed by a series of corners for Manchester United, but none could be converted, culminating in Fellaini heading wide from Blind's pass in the tenth minute. Rooney then struck a shot from distance; the ball took a deflection off Dann but was gathered by Hennessey at the second attempt after he initially fumbled it. In the 17th minute, Crystal Palace counter-attacked and Wickham was brought down by Smalling – Wickham got up and ran on with the ball and scored past de Gea but Clattenburg had declined to play the advantage, disallowed the goal and showed Smalling the first yellow card of the game. De Gea was forced to tip the ball over the crossbar from the resulting free kick from Cabaye.

In the 22nd minute, Mata received the ball from Fellaini and his low shot from the edge of the Crystal Palace penalty area was saved by Hennessey. Three minutes later, Fellaini's header took a deflection off Jedinak and passed just wide of the Crystal Palace goal. Bolasie's long-range shot was saved by de Gea before Wickham struck the ball wide of Manchester United's goal. Zaha then played in a cross which Wickham was unable to reach. With twelve minutes of the first half remaining, Rashford made a run down the right wing and crossed the ball to Martial whose first-time shot was cleared by a diving Ward. Within two minutes, Zaha won the ball from Blind but was tackled by Rooney, and Clattenburg denied Crystal Palace's appeal for a penalty. In the 38th minute, Carrick's shot from 25 yards (23 m) went high over the Crystal Palace bar and two minutes later, Rojo fouled Ward and became the second Manchester United player to be booked. Mata was then shown the yellow card for a high and late tackle on Souaré before Clattenburg brought the half to a close.

==== Second half ====
Neither side made any changes to their personnel during the interval and Manchester United kicked off the second half. Within two minutes, Dann fouled Rashford and became the first Crystal Palace player to be booked. In the 52nd minute, Rashford flicked the ball to Fellaini whose shot from inside the Crystal Palace penalty area struck the crossbar with Hennessey stationary in the goal. Two minutes later, Cabaye's free kick from the right side of the pitch deflected off Smalling's head and found Jedinak whose shot went high over the Manchester United goal. Martial's 61st-minute header from an Antonio Valencia cross struck the Crystal Palace goalpost before Delaney was booked for a foul on Rojo. The Manchester United player could not continue and was replaced by Matteo Darmian in the 66th minute. Rashford then went down with a knee injury after being involved in a clash with Zaha: unable to play on, he was substituted for Ashley Young, while Crystal Palace made their first change of the afternoon with Puncheon coming on for Cabaye.

In the 77th minute, Crystal Palace won a corner which was taken by Puncheon. The ball was headed clear by Fellaini and fell to Ward whose high cross-field pass found Puncheon on the left-hand side of the Manchester United penalty area. He controlled the ball before striking it with his left foot past de Gea to give Crystal Palace the lead. Manchester United equalised three minutes later through Mata. Rooney made a 30-yard (27 m) run before sending in a cross which Fellaini passed to Mata. His volley took a deflection off Ward and passed Hennessey low into the Crystal Palace goal to level the score at 1–1. With six minutes of regular time remaining, Crystal Palace made their second substitution with Wickham being replaced by Gayle, before Rooney was shown the yellow card for a late tackle on Ward. In the 87th minute, Souaré's cross was volleyed goalbound by Zaha but the ball went out for a corner. Mata was then replaced by Lingard as the game headed into five minutes of stoppage time, during which Crystal Palace made their final change of the match with the injured Dann being replaced by Adrian Mariappa. Zaha's late shot hit the side netting of the Manchester United goal and regular time ended with the scores level, sending the match into extra time.

==== Extra time ====
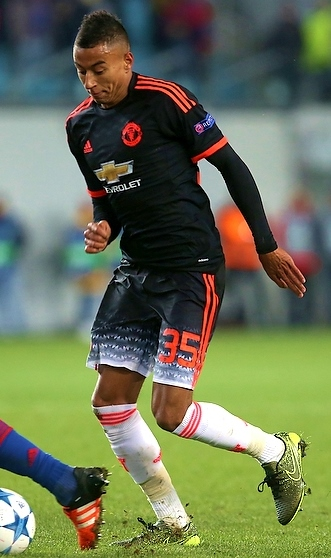
Jesse Lingard (pictured in 2015) scored the winning goal.

One minute into the first half of the additional period, Zaha went down while being challenged by Blind but Clattenburg declined the Crystal Palace appeals for a penalty. Chris Waddle, summarising for the BBC, described Crystal Palace's tactics as having become "like a training ground exercise" while Alan Smith in The Guardian conjectured that both sides had settled to play out the rest of extra time and resolve the match in a penalty shootout. In the 97th minute, Rooney's shot from distance was off-target before Hennessey punched away a corner from Blind. Fellaini was then booked for elbowing Jedinak before de Gea was forced to save Bolasie's volley from a Blind clearance. Just before the extra time interval, Smalling was shown a second yellow card for his foul on Bolasie, becoming the fourth player in the history of the FA Cup to be sent off in the final.

Early in the second period, Zaha passed to Gayle who struggled to cleanly strike the ball which was cleared by de Gea. From the subsequent corner, Manchester United counter-attacked but Lingard was fouled by James McArthur who became the third Crystal Palace player to be booked. Carrick then headed Lingard's cross wide from 8 yards (7 m). In the 110th minute, Manchester United took the lead: a low cross from Valencia was partly cleared by Delaney but Lingard struck the ball from around 18 yards (16 m) into the top corner of the Crystal Palace goal to make it 2–1. He was booked in the aftermath for removing his shirt during the celebrations. With eight minutes remaining, Jedinak struck the ball from distance but his shot went wide of Manchester United's goal. Crystal Palace increased the pressure and de Gea had to save at the feet of Zaha to maintain his side's lead. After two minutes of stoppage time, and despite attempts to score from Zaha and Bolasie, the match ended in a 2–1 victory for Manchester United who secured their first FA Cup final win since 2004.

=== Details ===
21 May 2016
17:30 BST

Crystal Palace	1–2 (a.e.t.)	Manchester United
Puncheon 78'	Report, Statistics	Mata 81'; Lingard 110'

Wembley Stadium, London
Attendance: 88,619
Referee: Mark Clattenburg (County Durham)

Crystal Palace	Manchester United

GK	13	(Wales) Wayne Hennessey
RB	2	(England) Joel Ward
CB	6	(England) Scott Dann	(yellow card) 47'	(substituted off) 90+4'
CB	27	(Republic of Ireland) Damien Delaney	(yellow card) 62'
LB	23	(Senegal) Pape Souaré
CM	15	(Australia) Mile Jedinak (c)
CM	18	(Scotland) James McArthur	(yellow card) 108'
RW	11	(England) Wilfried Zaha
AM	7	(France) Yohan Cabaye		(substituted off) 72'
LW	10	(Democratic Republic of the Congo) Yannick Bolasie
CF	21	(England) Connor Wickham		(substituted off) 86'
Substitutes:
GK	1	(Argentina) Julián Speroni
DF	3	(Jamaica) Adrian Mariappa		(substituted on) 90+4'
DF	34	(England) Martin Kelly
MF	26	(Mali) Bakary Sako
MF	42	(England) Jason Puncheon		(substituted on) 72'
FW	16	(England) Dwight Gayle		(substituted on) 86'
FW	25	(Togo) Emmanuel Adebayor
Manager:
(England) Alan Pardew

GK	1	(Spain) David de Gea
RB	25	(Ecuador) Antonio Valencia
CB	12	(England) Chris Smalling	(yellow card) 18' (yellow-red card) 105'
CB	17	(Netherlands) Daley Blind
LB	5	(Argentina) Marcos Rojo	(yellow card) 40'	(substituted off) 66'
CM	16	(England) Michael Carrick
CM	10	(England) Wayne Rooney (c)	(yellow card) 87'
RW	8	(Spain) Juan Mata	(yellow card) 45'	(substituted off) 90'
AM	27	(Belgium) Marouane Fellaini	(yellow card) 101'
LW	9	(France) Anthony Martial
CF	39	(England) Marcus Rashford		(substituted off) 72'
Substitutes:
GK	20	(Argentina) Sergio Romero
DF	4	(England) Phil Jones
DF	36	(Italy) Matteo Darmian		(substituted on) 66'
MF	18	(England) Ashley Young		(substituted on) 72'
MF	21	(Spain) Ander Herrera
MF	28	(France) Morgan Schneiderlin
MF	35	(England) Jesse Lingard	(yellow card) 111'	(substituted on) 90'
Manager:
(Netherlands) Louis van Gaal

Statistics
	Crystal Palace	Manchester United
Possession	33.6%	66.4%
Total shots	14	24
Shots on target	6	3
Corner kicks	8	12
Fouls committed	19	19
Yellow cards	3	5
Red cards	0	1

== Post-match ==
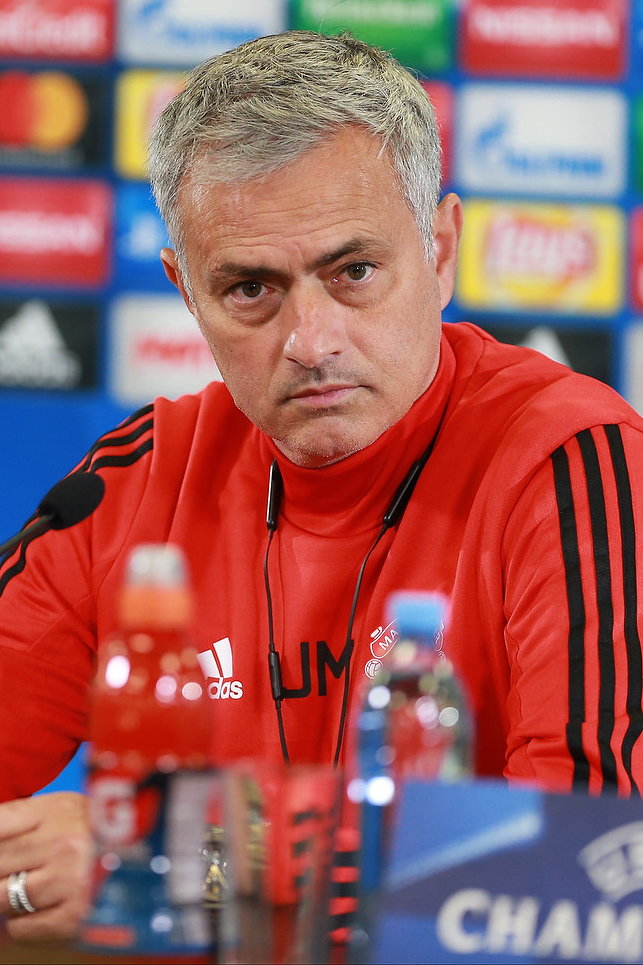
José Mourinho (pictured) replaced Louis van Gaal as Manchester United manager days after the final.

Rooney was named man of the match and expressed admiration for his opponents: "It was a great advert for the Premier League. Credit to Palace, they’ve had a tough end to the season". His manager van Gaal reflected on the significance for Manchester United and his own success, saying "It is fantastic to win this title for the club, for the fans, and also for me because I now have won the cup in four countries, and not many managers have done that." Crystal Palace defender Delaney was gracious in defeat, suggesting Manchester United had deserved their victory: "They were the better side on the day, we didn't do ourselves justice. Fair play to them, no hard feelings from my part." Pardew was less magnanimous, highlighting the officiating that had gone against his side: "My players gave everything. Everything. And they deserved to win but the game is like that. We had a couple of decisions that went against us, big time. Connor was through, Wilfried had a penalty but I'm not going to bleat."

Former Arsenal player Martin Keown described Clattenburg's decision not to play the advantage for Wickham's first-half opportunity as "a shocking decision" and "a massive let off for Manchester United". Alan Smith, writing in The Guardian, described the decision as "baffling" and "dismal". Clattenburg was later criticised by former players, including Alan Shearer and Rio Ferdinand, for some of the decisions he made during the match against Crystal Palace. He went on to officiate the 2016 UEFA Champions League Final and was named the Best Referee of the Year at the Globe Soccer Awards in December 2016. The following year, in an interview with the Irish Examiner, Clattenburg admitted that he "made a couple of errors" during the FA Cup match and that he believed he "could have done better".

As winners, Manchester United qualified for the 2016 FA Community Shield and the group stage of the 2016–17 UEFA Europa League. Since they had also qualified for the Europa League group stage based on their league position, Southampton entered the group stage (taking the league spot from Manchester United instead of their original spot in the third qualifying round), while Southampton's spot in the third qualifying round was given to West Ham United as the highest placed Premier League team not already qualified for European competitions.

Five days after the final, van Gaal was dismissed by Manchester United with his replacement José Mourinho being appointed the following day. In the following season, United were unable to defend their trophy as they were eliminated in the quarter-finals, after a 1–0 defeat to Chelsea at Stamford Bridge. Pardew was dismissed in December 2016 with Crystal Palace one point above the relegation positions in the Premier League, and was replaced by Sam Allardyce the following day. Crystal Palace were knocked out in the fourth round, losing 3–0 at home against Manchester City the following month.

== See also ==
- 2016 Football League Cup final
