= 2015 Cape Town Cup =

Tournament details
- Host country: South Africa
- Dates: 24 – 26 July
- Teams: 4 (from 2 confederations)
- Venue: 1 (in 1 host city)

Final positions
- Champions: (Portugal) Sporting CP (1st title)
- Runners-up: (England) Crystal Palace
- Third place: (South Africa) Ajax Cape Town (South Africa) Supersport United

Tournament statistics
- Matches played: 4
- Goals scored: 12 (3 per match)
- Top scorer(s): (Colombia) Fredy Montero (2 goals)

The 2015 Cape Town Cup was a pre-season men's football friendly tournament hosted by South African Premier Division club Ajax Cape Town and held at the Cape Town Stadium, the club's home ground.

The inaugural tournament took place on 24 July and 26 July 2015 and featured the hosts, Crystal Palace, Sporting CP and Supersport United.

The winner was Sporting CP after they beat Crystal Palace in the final. There was no 4th place due to a tie in the 3rd place match.

== Results ==
Semi-finals
24 July
(South Africa) Supersport United	0
(England) Crystal Palace	4
24 July
(South Africa) Ajax Cape Town	2 (2)
(Portugal) Sporting CP	2 (4)

Final
26 July
(England) Crystal Palace	0
(Portugal) Sporting CP	2
Third place
26 July
(South Africa) Supersport United	1
(South Africa) Ajax Cape Town	1

=== Semifinals ===
All kick-off times are local (UTC+02:00).

24 July 2015
17:45

Supersport United (South Africa)	0–4	(England) Crystal Palace
	Report	Jedinak 3'; Chung-yong 17'; Mutch 29'; Campbell 34'

Cape Town Stadium

24 July 2015
20:15

Ajax Cape Town (South Africa)	2–2	(Portugal) Sporting CP
Lolo 68' (pen.); Cale 80'	Report	Mané 19'; Semedo 84'
Penalties
Graham (penalty scored); Cale (penalty missed); Losper (penalty scored); Mobara (penalty missed)	2–4	(penalty scored) Gutierrez; (penalty scored) Mallmann; (penalty scored) Montero; (penalty scored) Esgaio

Cape Town Stadium

=== Third-place playoff ===
26 July 2015
13:00

Supersport United (South Africa)	1–1	(South Africa) Ajax Cape Town
Phala 15'	Report	Graham 90+4'

Cape Town Stadium

=== Final ===
26 July 2015
15:30

Crystal Palace (England)	0–2	(Portugal) Sporting CP
	Report	Montero 76', 86'

Cape Town Stadium
