= Yohan Cabaye =

French footballer (born 1986)

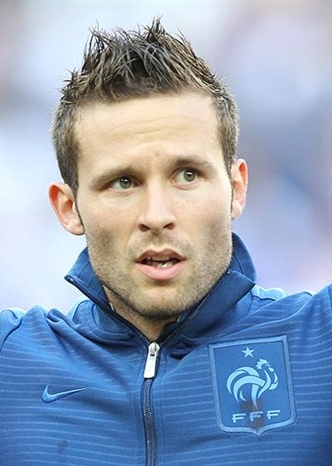
- Cabaye with France in UEFA Euro 2012

Personal information
- Full name: Yohan Cabaye
- Date of birth: 14 January 1986 (age 40)
- Place of birth: Tourcoing, France
- Height: 1.74 m (5 ft 9 in)
- Position: Midfielder

Youth career
- 1992–1998: US Tourcoing
- 1998–2004: Lille

Senior career*
Years	Team	Apps	(Gls)
2004–2011	Lille	191	(31)
2011–2014	Newcastle United	79	(17)
2014–2015	Paris Saint-Germain	39	(1)
2015–2018	Crystal Palace	96	(9)
2018–2019	Al-Nasr	13	(1)
2019–2020	Saint-Étienne	15	(0)
Total		433	(59)

International career
2004–2005	France U19	12	(2)
2006–2008	France U21	16	(3)
2010–2016	France	48	(4)
Medal record
Men's football
Representing France
UEFA European Championship
Runner-up	2016 France
- * Club domestic league appearances and goals

Yohan Cabaye (French pronunciation: [jɔ.an ka.baj]; born 14 January 1986) is a French former professional footballer who played as a midfielder.

Cabaye began his football career playing for hometown club US Tourcoing at the age of six. After seven years developing in the club's youth academy, he joined professional club Lille. Cabaye spent six years in the club's youth academy before making his professional debut in the 2004–05 season helping Lille win the 2004 UEFA Intertoto Cup. He became a regular starter in the following season and participated in the UEFA Champions League for the first time under Claude Puel. Under manager Rudi Garcia, Cabaye developed into a playmaker and had his best season to date in the 2009–10 season scoring over 15 goals from the midfield position. In the 2010–11 season, he was a part of the Lille team that won the league and cup double.

In June 2011 following the end of the season, Cabaye joined English club Newcastle United on a five-year deal. On 29 January 2014, Newcastle accepted a £19 million offer for Cabaye from Ligue 1 champions Paris Saint-Germain. Cabaye joined, signing a three-year contract with the club. On 10 July 2015, he joined Crystal Palace. After signing for Dubai club Al-Nasr and later returning to France to play for Saint-Étienne, Cabaye announced his retirement in February 2021.

Cabaye was a former French youth international, having represented his nation at under-16, under-18, under-19, under-20, and under-21 level. At under-19 level, he played on the team that won the 2005 UEFA European Under-19 Championship. With the under-20 team, Cabaye played at the 2006 edition of the Toulon Tournament. At under-21 level, he served as captain of the team for a portion of his stint. In August 2010, Cabaye was called up to the senior team for the first time under new manager Laurent Blanc, and made his international debut on 11 August in a 2–1 friendly defeat against Norway. He went on to earn 48 caps and represented France at two UEFA European Championships (2012, 2016) and the 2014 FIFA World Cup.

== Early life ==
Cabaye was born in the northern commune of Tourcoing in the department of Nord. His father, Didier, is a former football player who now works in the health care field in the city of Roubaix. At the age of 16, Cabaye's father played for professional club Lens and spent a year there training before a double leg fracture abruptly ended his career at the club. After healing, he spent time playing for amateur clubs Stade Jean-Macé and US Tourcoing. The two clubs later merged to form Tourcoing FC.

Cabaye has a younger brother, Geoffrey, who has played football in the lower divisions of the French and Belgian leagues, most notably with Tournai and Wasquehal. He is of Vietnamese descent through his paternal grandmother, and has stated he would like to visit the country, possibly to contribute to the development of football there. He later attended one of Vietnam's matches during the 2019 AFC Asian Cup. Cabaye is a Roman Catholic.

== Club career ==
=== Early career ===
Cabaye began his football career playing for hometown club Tourcoing FC. He started out at the club at the age of six. Cabaye, initially, did not meet the age requirement to enter the club's youth academy, however, due to his father working at the club at the time, he was allowed entrance into the club's academy. Cabaye spent several years developing at the club and, after excelling in youth games, gained the attention of professional club Lille. In July 1998, he signed youth papers with Lille and was inserted into the club's academy. Cabaye developed quickly in the club's academy and, by the 2003–04 season, was playing on the club's reserve team in the Championnat de France amateur, the fourth level of French football. Cabaye appeared in ten matches and scored one goal in his first season with the team. In the next season, Cabaye rotated between the reserve team and the first team. He played in 15 matches and scored two goals with the reserve team helping the team finish in 2nd place in its group, which resulted in qualification to the league playoffs.

=== Lille ===
==== 2004–2008 ====
Ahead of the 2004–05 season, Cabaye signed his first professional contract with Lille agreeing to a three-year deal. He trained with the team in the pre-season and participated in the 2004 UEFA Intertoto Cup, which Lille won, appearing in four matches. Cabaye was called up to the senior team for the first time under coach Claude Puel in November 2004. He made his league debut on 7 November 2004 in a league match against Istres. Cabaye started the match and played over 75 minutes in a 2–0 victory. He played with the team for the rest of the campaign contributing infrequently. On 21 December, Cabaye played 120 minutes in a 4–2 penalty shootout defeat to Strasbourg in the Coupe de la Ligue. Cabaye was one of two players who converted their penalty shots for Lille. On 20 February 2005, he received his first-ever red card in a 1–1 draw with Metz. Cabaye finished the campaign with 12 total appearances without scoring.

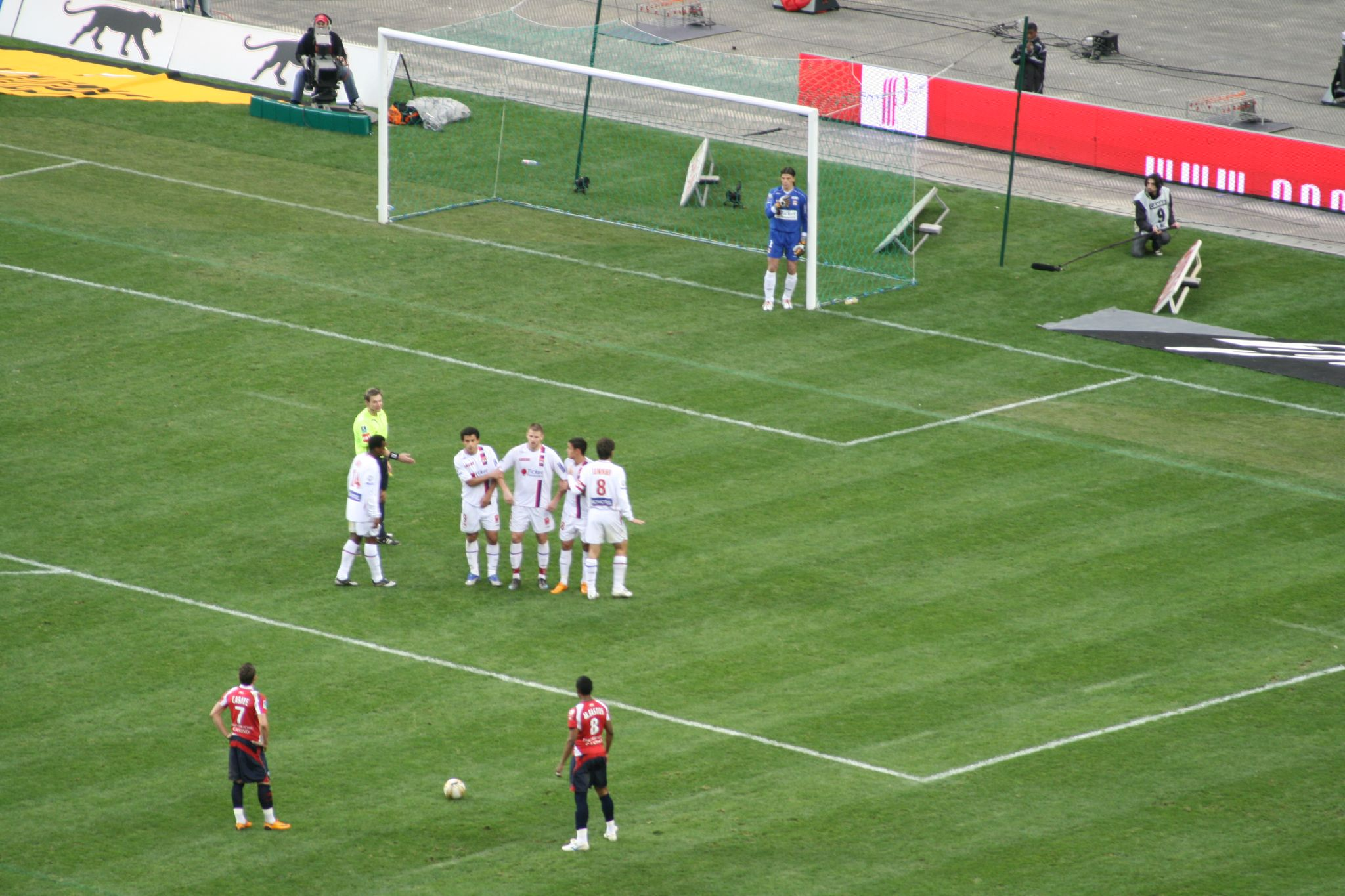
Cabaye (bottom left) preparing to take a free kick against Lyon in the 2007–08 season

In the following season, Cabaye's playing time increased significantly as he appeared in 27 league matches, including 20 starts. Cabaye also played in the 2003–04 editions of the UEFA Champions League and UEFA Cup playing in five total appearances in both competitions. He officially made his European debut on 14 September 2005 in a Champions League group stage match against Portuguese club Benfica. On 2 November, he appeared as a substitute in the team's 1–0 upset victory over English club Manchester United. In the league, Cabaye scored his first professional goal in a 3–2 defeat to Auxerre on 19 November. Cabaye's successful individual season was overshadowed by the team's performance as Lille finished in the top of the table, which resulted in the club qualifying for European competition for the third consecutive season. Midway through the season, Lille and Cabaye reached an agreement on a two-year contract extension, which was to expired in June 2010.

Cabaye struggled with ankle injuries in the 2006–07 campaign featuring in only five league matches in the first three months of the season. He scored his first goal of the year on 26 August 2006 in a 3–0 victory over Bordeaux. On 4 November, he scored his second goal of the season in another 3–0 victory, this time against rivals Valenciennes. Cabaye consistently appeared with the team in the league and Champions League before suffering a relapse of his previous ankle injury in a league match against Le Mans in March 2007. He was substituted out of the match and was subsequently rested for the rest of the season. Lille finished the season in 10th-place resulting in the club failing to qualify for European competition for the first time in three seasons.

Cabaye returned to action in the 2007–08 season appearing in 39 matches; 37 of which were starts. He scored a career-high seven goals in the league and assisted on several goals, as well. Lille went undefeated in all six matches Cabaye scored in, which were against such clubs as Bordeaux, Saint-Étienne, Metz, Le Mans, Caen, and Derby du Nord rivals Lens. Against Caen, Cabaye scored a double in a 5–0 thrashing. During the season, he signed another extension agreeing to a three-year deal until 2013. Included in the extension was a release clause of €75 million.

==== 2008–2011 ====
Ahead of the 2008–09 season, Puel departed the club for Lyon and Rudi Garcia was tipped to replace him. In Garcia's formation, Cabaye was paired in the midfield alongside new signing Florent Balmont who acted as a protector of Cabaye and a distributor of the ball along with defensive midfielder Rio Mavuba. Without the constant pressure of tracking back to defend, Cabaye was allowed to act as a playmaker for the talented trio of attackers Eden Hazard, Gervinho, and Pierre-Alain Frau. He appeared in 32 league matches starting them all as Lille finished in 5th place, thus returning to European competition in the next season. Cabaye scored five goals in the league and one in the Coupe de France, which came against amateur club Dunkerque in a 3–0 victory in the Round of 32.

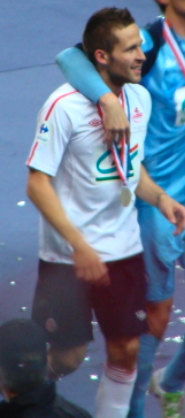
Cabaye celebrating Lille's 2011 Coupe de France Final victory

Cabaye had arguably one of the best seasons of his career in the 2009–10 season. He appeared in 46 total matches scoring a career-high 15 goals, seven of which were penalty conversions, and assisting on ten. Cabaye scored his first goal of the season on 31 October 2009 in a 2–0 win over Grenoble. In the next five league matches, he scored five goals; four penalty conversions against Valenciennes, Lyon, Monaco, and Saint-Étienne and one from open play against Bordeaux. On 13 February 2010, Cabaye assisted on two goals in 3–1 win against Boulogne. On 18 April, he scored a penalty, another goal in open play, and assisted on one in 4–0 victory over Monaco. His goal in open play against Monaco was nominated for the Goal of the Season. In the UEFA Europa League, Cabaye scored goals against Serbian club Sevojno in the qualifying rounds and Czech club Slavia Prague in the group stage as Lille reached the knockout stage of the competition. The club was eliminated by English club Liverpool in the Round of 16. Lille finished the campaign in fourth place having lost out on qualification to the UEFA Champions League on the final match day of the season.

In the 2010–11 season, Cabaye remained a fixture in the starting eleven under Garcia, however, unlike last season, the midfielder did not play as the primary play-maker as these duties were relinquished to wing forwards Hazard and Gervinho. On 24 October 2010, Cabaye scored his first goal of the campaign in a 3–1 defeat to Marseille. Three days later, he scored two goals, one from open play and another from the penalty spot, in a 4–1 win over Caen in the Coupe de la Ligue. After failing to score or assist on a goal in nearly two months, Cabaye provided assists for two Moussa Sow goals in a 6–3 hammering of Lorient in December 2010. In April 2011, Cabaye provided three assists in three league matches against Caen, Bordeaux, and Arles-Avignon. Cabaye also scored a goal in the match against the latter club. Lille went unbeaten in the three matches, which gave the club a four-point lead in the table heading into the final month of the season.

Cabaye was also instrumental in the team's advancement to the 2011 Coupe de France Final appearing in all five matches the team contested, four of them as a starter. In the final, Cabaye played the entire match as Lille defeated Paris Saint-Germain 1–0 at the Stade de France. A week later, Lille clinched the Ligue 1 title by drawing 2–2 away to Paris Saint-Germain, achieving the club's first league championship since the 1953–54 season and the club's first double since the 1945–46 season. The domestic cup and league title were the first two domestic honours of Cabaye's career.

=== Newcastle United ===
Following Lille's final game of the 2010–11 season, a 3–2 win over Rennes, Lille manager Rudi Garcia confirmed that Cabaye would be departing the club to sign with Newcastle United in England, stating, "Yohan told us yesterday – first me, then the whole group before the game – that he has chosen to join Newcastle. It is a choice that I respect, although I wish he continued the adventure with us." The transfer was confirmed on 10 June 2011, with Cabaye agreeing to a five-year deal with Newcastle. The transfer fee was undisclosed. Cabaye described the move to Newcastle as "fantastic" while also stating, "I have enjoyed great times with Lille, but the time is right now to test myself against the best and playing for Newcastle United in the Premier League does just that."

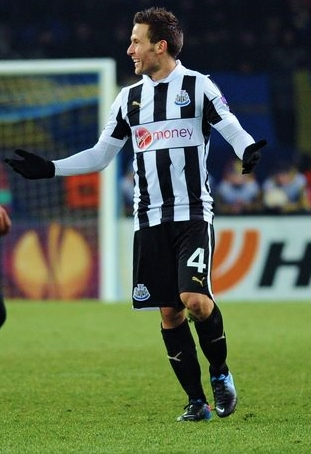
Cabaye playing for Newcastle in the second leg of a Round of 32 Europa League match against Metalist Kharkiv, 2013.

On 15 July, Cabaye made his debut for Newcastle in a pre-season friendly win over against Conference National side Darlington, after coming on as a substitute in the 12th minute. Days before the season began, Cabaye was handed the number 4 shirt, which had been made available following the departure of ex-captain Kevin Nolan early in the transfer window. on 13 August, he made his league debut in a 0–0 draw against Arsenal. On 22 October, Cabaye scored his first goal for Newcastle against Wigan Athletic. Four days later, he netted his second goal for the club in a 4–3 defeat to Blackburn Rovers in the Football League Cup. On 17 December, in the team's 0–0 draw with Swansea City, Cabaye covered the most distance by any Newcastle player all season in the match, having travelled over 11.6 kilometres (7.2 mi). A fortnight later, Cabaye netted the team's second goal in a 3–0 win against Manchester United with a 30-yard free kick. On 6 April 2012, Cabaye assisted on both team goals, scored by Papiss Cissé, in Newcastle's 2–0 victory over Swansea City. On 21 April, Cabaye assisted another Cissé goal and scored two himself in a 3–0 home victory against Stoke City, lifting Newcastle into the top four in the league table.

On 21 October 2012, Cabaye scored his first goal of the 2012–13 season with a neat finish in the Tyne-Wear derby against Sunderland in a 1–1 draw. On 4 November, he scored the opening goal against Liverpool in a 1–1 draw. It was first goal scored at Anfield by a Newcastle player since 2004. Later that month, it was announced that Cabaye needed groin surgery and would be out until February 2013. On 19 January 2013, he made his return and scored the first goal in an eventual 2–1 home defeat to Reading from another trademark free kick. On his second start following his return, Cabaye scored a half-volley from outside the penalty box against Aston Villa. In two home games against Southampton and Stoke City, he converted a penalty and scored a free kick goal, respectively. On 2 March, Cabaye made his first start as captain against Swansea City, replacing the injured regular captain Fabricio Coloccini.

On 19 August 2013, the eve of Newcastle's Premier League season opener against Manchester City, Arsenal made a bid of £10 million for Cabaye which was rejected. After Newcastle lost the match 4–0, manager Alan Pardew confirmed that Cabaye had been omitted from the squad that evening because his head had been turned by the bid, which he condemned as disrespectful in both value and timing. The midfielder also refused to play for the club in their following game against West Ham United on 24 August. On 19 October 2013, Cabaye scored his second goal of the season with a 30-yard strike against Liverpool at St James' Park in a 2–2 draw. On 7 December, Cabaye wrote his name into Newcastle folklore by scoring the winner in the 1–0 victory over Manchester United, their first victory at Old Trafford for 41 years. On 21 December, he scored the first goal in a comprehensive 3–0 victory at Crystal Palace, before again scoring in the 5–1 win against Stoke City on Boxing Day. In his final game, on 18 January 2014, Cabaye bagged a brace in a 3–1 win over West Ham United, equalling his 2012–13 goal tally in just half a season. His first goal was a shot from just inside the box after good skill and with his last kick for Newcastle, Cabaye scored a free-kick from the edge of the box.

=== Paris Saint-Germain ===
On 29 January 2014, Paris Saint-Germain announced that Cabaye had joined the Ligue 1 club for an undisclosed fee, estimated around £19 million plus add-ons. Cabaye signed a three-and-a-half-year deal with the club and was allocated the number 4 shirt. On 18 February, Cabaye scored his first PSG goal in a 4–0 victory over German side Bayer Leverkusen in the UEFA Champions League round-of-16. On 19 April, Cabaye won his first trophy with PSG as they beat Lyon 2–1 in the 2014 Coupe de la Ligue Final.

On 22 August 2014, Cabaye was sent off for two bookings in a goalless draw away to Evian. On 17 October, Cabaye scored his first league goal since returning to France in PSG's 3–1 away win over Lens.

=== Crystal Palace ===
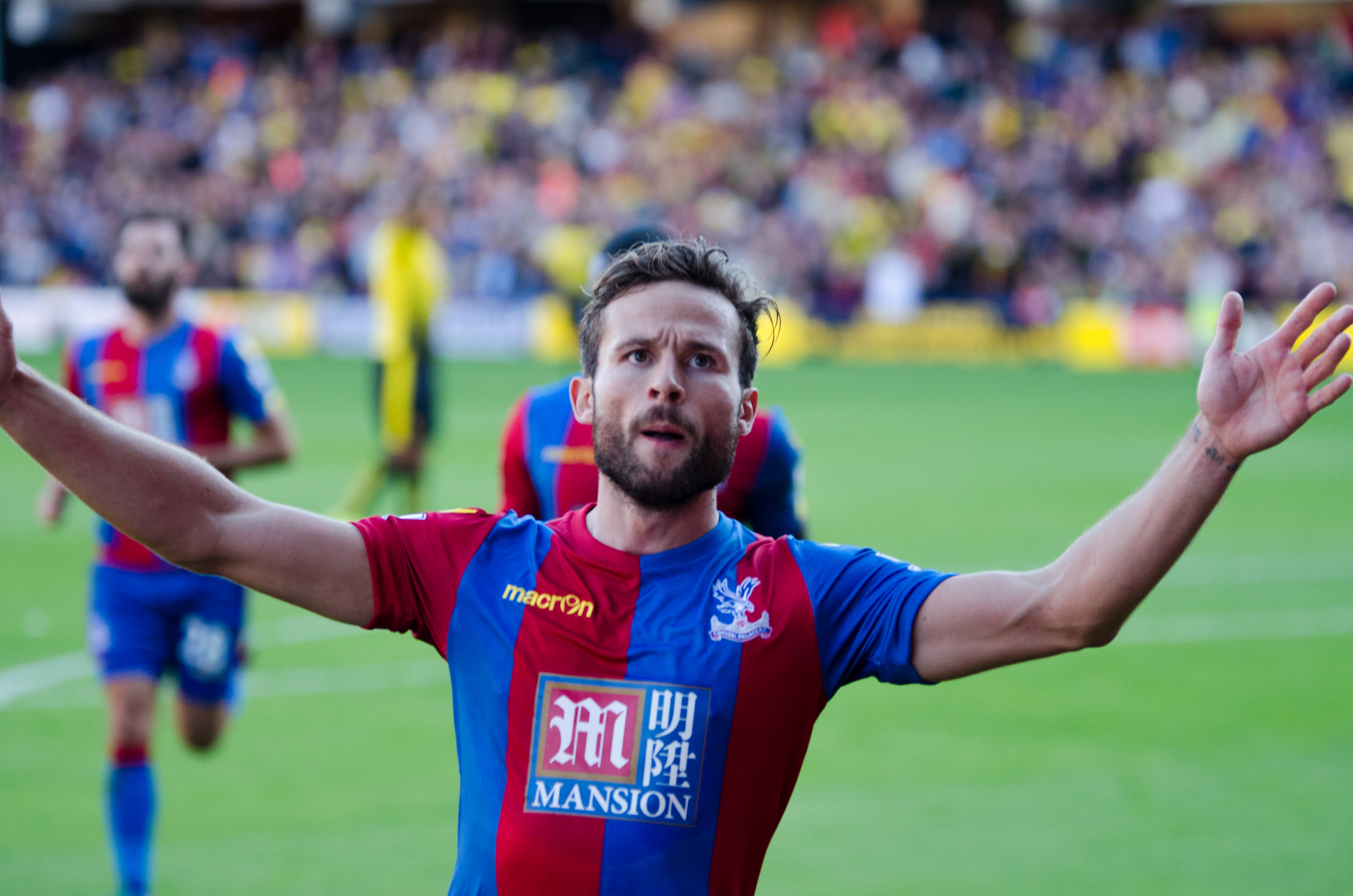
Cabaye celebrating scoring against Watford, 2015

On 10 July 2015, Cabaye joined Premier League team Crystal Palace, on a three-year contract for a club record, but undisclosed, fee. He made his debut away to Norwich City on 8 August, scoring the final goal of a 3–1 win.

Cabaye quickly became the club's first choice penalty taker, and scored three penalties in three consecutive matches against Watford, West Bromwich Albion and West Ham United. On 12 December, he scored his second goal from open play and his fifth of the season, against Southampton. On 11 March 2016, he opened the scoring with a penalty against Reading, during Palace's FA Cup run, where they would finish runners-up. On 30 April, his return to St James' Park, he had his penalty saved by Karl Darlow, in an eventual 1–0 loss.

On 27 August 2016, Cabaye had his penalty saved by Artur Boruc, in an eventual 1–1 draw with AFC Bournemouth. He scored his first goal of the season against Leicester City; the consolation goal in a 3–1 loss. On 26 December, Cabaye opened the scoring in a 1–1 draw with Watford, the first match under new Palace manager Sam Allardyce. After providing consecutive assists against Middlesbrough and West Bromwich Albion for the first time since April 2012, Cabaye ended a run of forty-seven Premier League matches without doing so. On 1 July 2018, Cabaye was released by Crystal Palace following the conclusion of his contract.

=== Al-Nasr ===
On 3 July 2018, Cabaye joined Dubai-based Al-Nasr on a free transfer, signing a two-year deal. He wore the number 7 shirt at his new club, his previous jersey number at Palace.

On 13 January 2019, it was announced Cabaye had left the club.

=== Saint-Étienne ===
On 27 August 2019, Cabaye returned to France and penned a one-year contract with AS Saint-Étienne.

On 19 February 2021, Cabaye officially announced his retirement from professional football.

== International career ==
=== Youth ===
Cabaye is a former French youth international having represented his nation internationally at under-16, under-18, under-19, under-20, and under-21 level. He earned his first call-up at international level in August 2001 at a training camp headed by Pierre Mankowski. Cabaye earned his first selection on 26 September 2001 in a 4–0 win over Iceland. He was later selected to appear in the Tournoi du Val-de-Marne. France won the competition. Cabaye was called up to the under-18 team by coach Jean Gallice on 5 March 2004 as a replacement for the injured Yoann Gourcuff for matches in Germany. He was selected for the team on 9 March in a 1–1 draw with Germany at the Hardtwaldstadion in Sandhausen. Cabaye appeared in the next five matches with the team, which included victories over Scotland, Ukraine, and the Czech Republic in the Slovakia Cup, a youth international tournament catered to under-18 players.

At under-19 level, Cabaye was an early call-up to the team. He was selected for the team's first match of the season against Turkey, which France won 2–1. In first round qualification for the 2005 UEFA European Under-19 Championship, Cabaye appeared in two group stage matches. He scored his first youth international goal on 30 September 2004 in qualification against Azerbaijan in a 3–0 victory. France later reached the tournament and Cabaye participated in the competition, which was held in Northern Ireland. Cabaye appeared in four of the five matches France contested as the nation won the competition; its 6th UEFA U-19 Championship title. In the semi-finals against Germany, he scored the game-winning goal in a 3–2 victory. In the final, France defeated England 3–1. Cabaye played the entire match and finished his under-19 career with 15 appearances and two goals. In the following season, Cabaye was called up to the under-20 team to participate in the 2006 edition of the Toulon Tournament. In the competition, he appeared in four of the five matches France contested scoring a free-kick goal in a 2–0 semi-final victory over China. France later won the competition defeating the Netherlands 5–3 on penalties in the final.

Cabaye earned his first call up to the under-21 team under coach René Girard in the team's first match following the 2006 UEFA European Under-21 Championship against Belgium appearing as a half-time substitute for Ronald Zubar. Cabaye appeared with the team in qualifiers for the 2009 UEFA European Under-21 Championship. On 12 October 2007, he captained the team for the first time in a 4–0 qualification victory over Bosnia and Herzegovina. Cabaye later captained the team in victories over the Czech Republic and the Netherlands in a summer tournament held in Sweden. He scored his first under-21 goal in the victory over the Dutch. On 20 August 2008, Cabaye scored his second under-21 goal in a 2–2 draw with Slovakia and converted his final under-21 goal in a 5–0 victory over Luxembourg 15 days later. Cabaye's under-21 career came to an end following the team's defeat to Germany in a two-legged playoff, which determined who would earn a berth in the 2009 UEFA European Under-21 Championship.

=== Senior ===
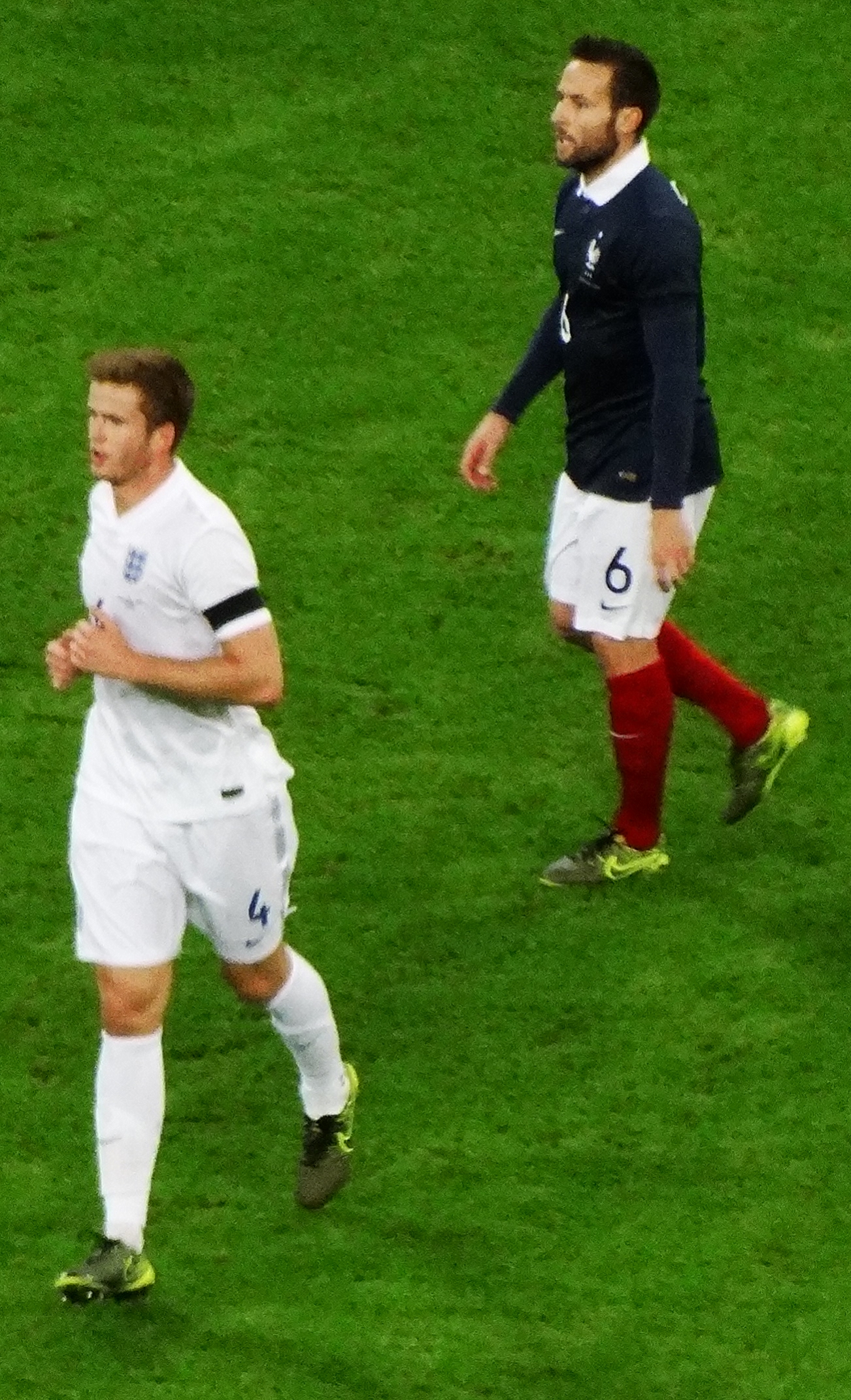
Cabaye (blue) playing against England in November 2015

After failing to appear at international level for nearly two years, on 5 August 2010, Cabaye was called up to the senior team for the first time by new manager Laurent Blanc for the team's friendly match against Norway on 11 August 2010. Cabaye made his senior international debut in the match appearing as a substitute for Yann M'Vila. He was called back into the team in September for UEFA Euro 2012 qualification matches against Belarus and Bosnia and Herzegovina, however, he was forced to drop out of the selection due to injury.

On 9 February 2011, Cabaye earned his second career cap in the team's 1–0 victory over Brazil. After appearing regularly in qualifying for UEFA Euro 2012, on 29 May 2012, Cabaye was named to the squad to participate in the competition. He made his debut at a senior international competition on 11 June in the team's opening match against England. Cabaye started the match, which ended in a 1–1 draw, and was replaced by Hatem Ben Arfa in the 84th minute. In the team's ensuing group game against Ukraine, he scored his first senior international goal netting France's second goal in a 2–0 victory. On 19 November 2013, Cabaye was part of the France team that staged a remarkable comeback in the second leg of the World Cup play-off against Ukraine. Trailing 2–0 in the first leg, France won the return game in Paris 3–0 to qualify for the 2014 FIFA World Cup.

Cabaye started in four of France's five matches at the 2014 World Cup, having been suspended from their third group match against Ecuador after receiving cautions against Honduras and Switzerland. Cabaye featured as the deepest lying of France's midfield three, playing behind then-PSG teammate Blaise Matuidi and either Paul Pogba or Moussa Sissoko. France impressed early in the tournament, but lost 1–0 to eventual winners Germany in the quarter-finals.

Cabaye found it hard to displace the impressive partnership of Matuidi and N'Golo Kanté at UEFA Euro 2016. He only appeared twice in the tournament; playing the full match against Switzerland, and as an injury-time substitute against Germany. The appearance against Germany proved to be the last time he played for France, as he was an unused substitute in the final against Portugal, and although he was called up for the World Cup qualification matches against Bulgaria and the Netherlands in the autumn, he was again an unused substitute.

== Post-playing career ==
Ahead of the 2021–22 season, Cabaye joined the youth academy of Paris Saint-Germain, his former club, as a sporting coordinator.

== Personal life ==
From 2010 to 2016, Cabaye was married to Fiona; they had been in a relationship since 2008. They have three daughters together: Myla (born 2009), Charlize (born 2013) and Romy (born 2015). With his current partner Laëtitia Bernardini, he has a daughter, Linoï (born 2016), and a son, Maïan (born 2017).

== Career statistics ==
=== Club ===
Appearances and goals by club, season and competition
Club	Season	League			National cup (Note: Includes the Coupe de France, FA Cup and UAE President's Cup)		League cup (Note: Includes the Coupe de la Ligue, Football League/EFL Cup and UAE League Cup)		Continental		Total	
Club	Season	Division	Apps	Goals	Apps	Goals	Apps	Goals	Apps	Goals	Apps	Goals
Lille	2004–05	Ligue 1	6	0	2	0	2	0	4 (Note: Appearances in UEFA Cup)	0	14	0
Lille	2005–06	Ligue 1	27	1	3	0	2	0	4 (Note: Two appearances in UEFA Champions League, two appearances in UEFA Cup)	0	36	1
Lille	2006–07	Ligue 1	22	3	2	1	1	0	8 (Note: Appearances in UEFA Champions League)	0	33	4
Lille	2007–08	Ligue 1	36	7	2	0	1	0	—		39	7
Lille	2008–09	Ligue 1	32	5	3	1	0	0	—		35	6
Lille	2009–10	Ligue 1	32	13	0	0	2	0	12 (Note: Appearances in UEFA Europa League)	2	46	15
Lille	2010–11	Ligue 1	36	2	5	0	1	2	8	1	50	5
Lille	Total		191	31	17	2	9	2	36	3	253	38
Newcastle United	2011–12	Premier League	34	4	2	0	2	1	—		38	5
Newcastle United	2012–13	Premier League	26	6	0	0	0	0	9	0	35	6
Newcastle United	2013–14	Premier League	19	7	0	0	1	0	—		20	7
Newcastle United	Total		79	17	2	0	3	1	9	0	93	18
Paris Saint-Germain	2013–14	Ligue 1	15	0	0	0	2	0	4	1	21	1
Paris Saint-Germain	2014–15	Ligue 1	24	1	4	1	3	0	5	0	36	2
Paris Saint-Germain	Total		39	1	4	1	5	0	9	1	57	3
Crystal Palace	2015–16	Premier League	33	5	6	1	1	0	—		40	6
Crystal Palace	2016–17	Premier League	32	4	1	0	2	0	—		35	4
Crystal Palace	2017–18	Premier League	31	0	1	0	2	0	—		34	0
Crystal Palace	Total		96	9	8	1	5	0	—		109	10
Al Nasr	2018–19	UAE Pro League	13	1	1	0	6	1	—		20	2
Saint-Étienne	2019–20	Ligue 1	15	0	4	0	1	1	1	0	21	1
Career total			433	59	36	4	29	5	55	4	553	72

=== International ===
Appearances and goals by national team and year
National team	Year	Apps	Goals
France	2010	1	0
France	2011	8	0
France	2012	10	1
France	2013	7	1
France	2014	12	1
France	2015	6	1
France	2016	4	0
Total		48	4

Scores and results list France's goal tally first, score column indicates score after each Cabaye goal.

List of international goals scored by Yohan Cabaye
No.	Date	Venue	Opponent	Score	Result	Competition
1	15 June 2012	Donbas Arena, Donetsk, Ukraine	Ukraine	2–0	2–0	UEFA Euro 2012
2	11 October 2013	Parc des Princes, Paris, France	Australia	4–0	6–0	Friendly
3	8 June 2014	Stade Pierre-Mauroy, Villeneuve-d'Ascq, France	Jamaica	1–0	8–0	Friendly
4	8 October 2015	Allianz Riviera, Nice, France	Armenia	2–0	4–0	Friendly

== Honours ==
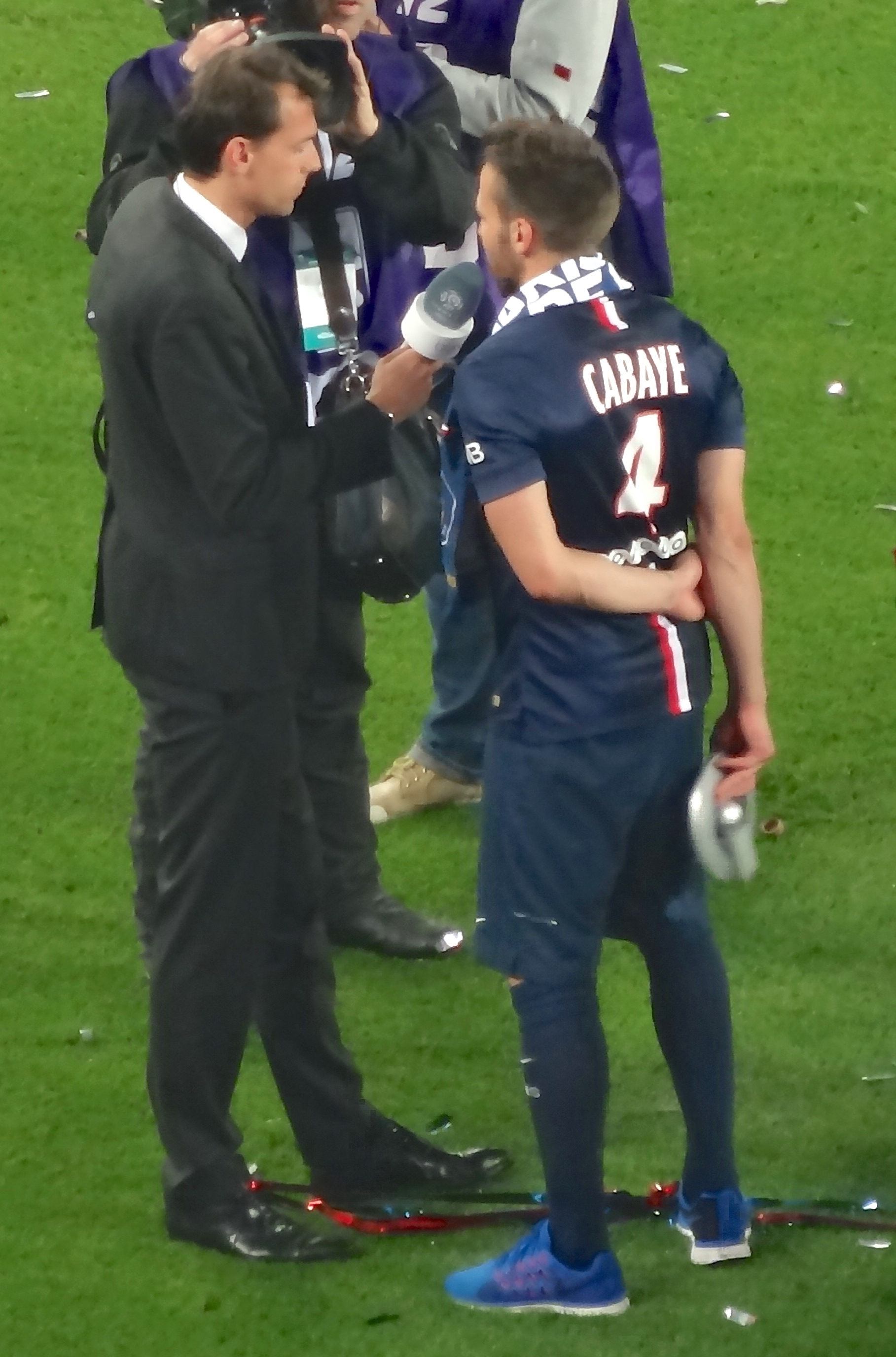
Cabaye being interviewed after PSG's 2015 Coupe de France Final victory

Lille

- Ligue 1: 2010–11
- Coupe de France: 2010–11

Paris Saint-Germain

- Ligue 1: 2013–14, 2014–15
- Coupe de France: 2014–15
- Coupe de la Ligue: 2013–14, 2014–15

Crystal Palace

- FA Cup runner-up: 2015–16

Saint-Étienne

- Coupe de France runner-up: 2019–20

France U19

- UEFA European Under-19 Championship: 2005

France

- UEFA European Championship runner-up: 2016

Individual

- North-East FWA Player of the Year: 2013

== See also ==
- List of Vietnam footballers born outside Vietnam
