= Pape Souaré =

Senegalese footballer (born 1990)

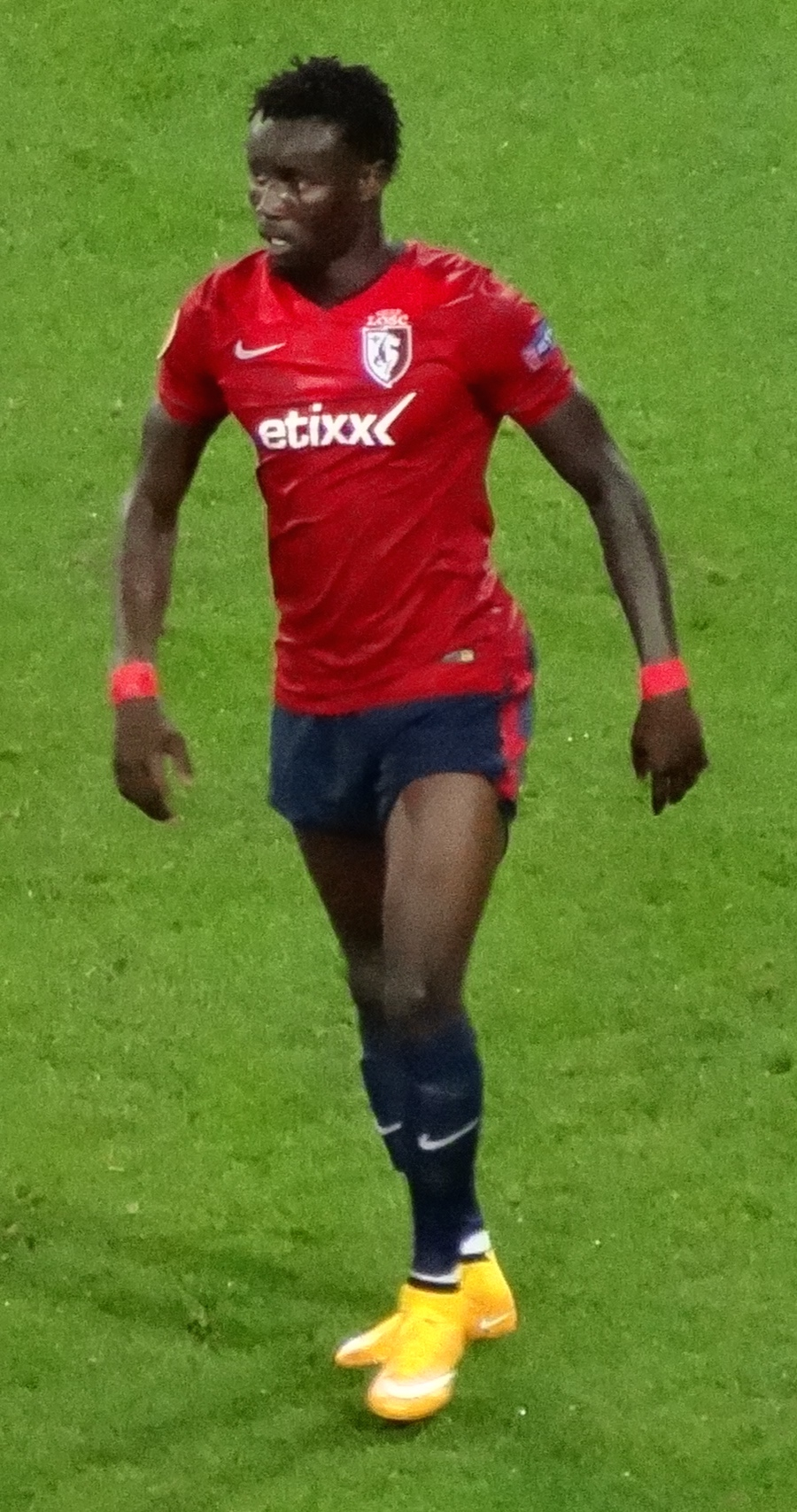
- Souaré playing for Lille in 2014

Personal information
- Full name: Pape N'Diaye Souaré
- Date of birth: 6 June 1990 (age 36)
- Place of birth: Mbao, Senegal
- Height: 1.78 m (5 ft 10 in)
- Position: Left-back

Senior career*
Years	Team	Apps	(Gls)
2007–2008	Diambars		
2008–2012	Lille B	55	(7)
2008–2015	Lille	53	(3)
2012–2013	→ Reims (loan)	23	(0)
2015–2019	Crystal Palace	48	(0)
2019–2021	Troyes	17	(0)
2021–2022	Charlton Athletic	9	(0)
2023	Morecambe	7	(0)
2023–2024	Motherwell	3	(0)
2024	AFC Croydon Athletic	3	(0)
2024–2025	Ebbsfleet United	8	(0)

International career
2012	Senegal Olympic	4	(0)
2012–2018	Senegal	22	(1)
- * Club domestic league appearances and goals as of 13:50, 30 January 2025 (UTC)

Pape N'Diaye Souaré (French: [pap swaʁe]; born 6 June 1990) is a Senegalese professional footballer who plays as a left-back.

== Club career ==
Born in Mbao, Pikine Department, Souaré spent his early career with Diambars, Lille II, Lille and Reims.

He moved to Crystal Palace on a three-and-a-half-year deal in January 2015 for an undisclosed fee, reported as £3.45 million. He made his Palace debut on 14 February in the fifth round of the FA Cup, a 2–1 home loss to Liverpool, and was described by Dominic Fifield of The Observer as looking "rusty and susceptible".

On 22 January 2016, it was announced that Souaré had signed a new three-and-a-half-year contract with Palace. He was sent off on 13 February at the end of a 2–1 loss to Watford at Selhurst Park, for fouling Valon Behrami.

After over a year out of football following a car crash, Souaré made his first appearance on 19 September 2017 in a 1–0 home win over Huddersfield Town in the third round of the EFL Cup. He was praised for his performance by manager Roy Hodgson.

In August 2019, after his contract with Crystal Palace expired, Souaré joined French Ligue 2 club Troyes on a one-season contract with an option of a further 12 months.

In July 2021, having made no appearances for Troyes in the previous season, Souaré trained with the Crystal Palace under-23 squad, with a view to maintain fitness, and appeared in pre-season matches for the side.

On 6 September 2021, Souaré returned to England to join League One club Charlton Athletic on a one-year deal. On 10 May 2022, it was confirmed that Souaré would leave Charlton Athletic when his contract expired at the end of the season.

On 17 March 2023, Souaré joined League One club Morecambe on a contract until the end of the season. He was released by the club at the end of the season.

On 17 July 2023, Motherwell announced the signing of Souaré on a six-month contract. He left the club on 1 January 2024 following the expiry of his contract.

On 31 August 2024, Souare joined Isthmian League South East Division club AFC Croydon Athletic. In October 2024, he joined National League side Ebbsfleet United. He departed the club in January 2025 following the expiration of his short-term contract.

== International career ==
Souaré made his international debut for Senegal on 29 February 2012, in a goalless friendly draw against South Africa at the Moses Mabhida Stadium in Durban. He later competed at the 2012 Summer Olympics, and was a squad member at the 2015 Africa Cup of Nations. He scored his first international goal from a 20-yard free kick on 29 March 2016 as the Lions de Teranga won 2–1 away to Niger in 2017 Africa Cup of Nations qualification. Following his car crash, he returned to the national team in March 2018.

He was not included in Senegal's squad for the 2018 FIFA World Cup.

== Personal life ==
On 11 September 2016, Souaré was airlifted to hospital after being involved in a road accident on the M4. He sustained injuries to his thigh and jawbone. It was thought that he would be out for six months, although he returned to training after 11 months.

== Career statistics ==
=== Club ===
As of match played 26 December 2024

Appearances and goals by club, season and competition
Club	Season	League			National cup		League cup		Other		Total	
Club	Season	Division	Apps	Goals	Apps	Goals	Apps	Goals	Apps	Goals	Apps	Goals
Lille B	2008–09	CFA	16	1	0	0	0	0	0	0	16	1
Lille B	2009–10	CFA	19	5	0	0	0	0	0	0	19	5
Lille B	2010–11	CFA	13	0	0	0	0	0	0	0	13	0
Lille B	2011–12	CFA	7	1	0	0	0	0	0	0	7	1
Lille B	Total		55	7	0	0	0	0	0	0	55	7
Lille	2010–11	Ligue 1	4	0	0	0	0	0	1	0	5	0
Lille	2011–12	Ligue 1	4	0	0	0	1	0	0	0	5	0
Lille	2012–13	Ligue 1	0	0	0	0	0	0	0	0	0	0
Lille	2013–14	Ligue 1	33	3	2	0	1	0	0	0	36	3
Lille	2014–15	Ligue 1	12	0	1	0	1	0	9	0	23	0
Lille	Total		53	3	3	0	3	0	10	0	69	3
Reims (loan)	2012–13	Ligue 1	23	0	1	0	1	0	0	0	25	0
Crystal Palace	2014–15	Premier League	9	0	1	0	0	0	0	0	10	0
Crystal Palace	2015–16	Premier League	34	0	5	0	2	0	0	0	41	0
Crystal Palace	2016–17	Premier League	3	0	0	0	1	0	0	0	4	0
Crystal Palace	2017–18	Premier League	1	0	1	0	2	0	0	0	4	0
Crystal Palace	2018–19	Premier League	1	0	1	0	2	0	0	0	4	0
Crystal Palace	Total		48	0	8	0	7	0	0	0	63	0
Troyes	2019–20	Ligue 2	17	0	0	0	0	0	0	0	17	0
Troyes	2020–21	Ligue 2	0	0	0	0	0	0	0	0	0	0
Troyes	Total		17	0	0	0	0	0	0	0	17	0
Charlton Athletic	2021–22	League One	9	0	2	0	0	0	2	0	13	0
Morecambe	2022–23	League One	7	0	0	0	0	0	0	0	7	0
Motherwell	2023–24	Scottish Premiership	3	0	0	0	3	0	0	0	6	0
AFC Croydon Athletic	2024–25	Isthmian League South East Division	3	0	0	0	—		0	0	3	0
Ebbsfleet United	2024–25	National League	8	0	0	0	—		1	0	9	0
Career total			227	10	13	0	14	0	13	0	267	10

=== International ===
As of 25 September 2016
Scores and results list Senegal's goal tally first.

Goal	Date	Venue	Opponent	Score	Result	Competition
1.	29 March 2016	Stade Général Seyni Kountché, Niamey, Niger	Niger	2–0	2–1	2017 Africa Cup of Nations qualification

== Honours ==
Lille

- Ligue 1: 2010–11

Crystal Palace

- FA Cup runner-up: 2015–16
