= Cecil Lolo =

South African soccer player

Personal information
- Full name: Cecil Sonwabile Lolo
- Date of birth: 11 March 1988
- Place of birth: Centane, Eastern Cape, South Africa
- Date of death: 25 October 2015 (aged 27)
- Place of death: Cape Town, South Africa
- Height: 1.70 m (5 ft 7 in)
- Positions: Defender; midfielder

Youth career
- African Tribes
- 2001–2009: Ajax Cape Town

Senior career*
Years	Team	Apps	(Gls)
2009–2010	→ iKapa Sporting (loan)		
2009–2015	Ajax Cape Town	97	(2)
- * Club domestic league appearances and goals as of 22 February 2011 ‡ National team caps and goals as of 22 February 2011

Cecil Sonwabile Lolo (11 March 1988 – 25 October 2015) was a South African professional soccer player, who played as a defender and midfielder for Ajax Cape Town.

== Career ==
=== Club career ===
Lolo made his professional debut for Ajax Cape Town as a substitute under Dutch coach Foppe de Haan on 20 August 2010 in the MTN 8 quarter-finals against Mamelodi Sundowns. Lolo took one of the penalties as the Urban Warriors won the match 4–3 in a penalty shoot-out, after the sides were tied at 1–1 after extra-time.

He made his official league debut on 17 September 2010 in a 2–0 win over Platinum Stars. He was promoted from the club's youth academy ranks after years of good showing for the club youth team, subsequent to a loan spell in the National First Division at iKapa Sporting. He scored his first goal on 15 February 2012 in a late comeback over Platinum Stars at the Cape Town Stadium. Lolo scored the winner in the 95th minute after Matthew Booth and Lebogang Manyama scored in the 88th and 92nd minute to win 3–2. Lolo played an instrumental role in Ajax's MTN 8 triumph on 19 September 2015 having a man of the match performance in the final against Kaizer Chiefs winning 1–0. He played what would be his last ever match in a 1–1 draw against Kaizer Chiefs on 26 September 2015. Lolo had made 114 appearances in total scoring two goals and receiving 12 yellow cards and never received a red card. Cecil Lolo was adored by fans, with a variety of popular songs adapted in his praise. One of them being rap hit CoCo (O.T. Genasis song) lyrics adapted from "I'm in love with the CoCo" to "I'm in love with the Lolo".

== Personal life ==
Lolo's family originates from Centane near Butterworth in the Eastern Cape. He had three children from two different mothers.

== Death ==
Lolo died in a car accident on 25 October 2015 in Khayelitsha. He was buried in Chebe, Kentani in the Eastern Cape on 7 November 2015.

=== Legacy ===
His jersey number 21 has been officially retired by Ajax Cape Town, the club's CEO made the announcement during his tribute speech at the player's memorial services on Friday, 30 October 2015.
