= Travis Graham =

South African soccer player

Personal information
- Date of birth: 8 May 1993 (age 33)
- Place of birth: Cape Town, South Africa
- Height: 1.78 m (5 ft 10 in)
- Position: Midfielder

Youth career
- Devonshire Rovers
- Ajax Cape Town

Senior career*
Years	Team	Apps	(Gls)
2012–2018	Ajax Cape Town	94	(1)
2019	Cape Town City	1	(0)
2020	Cape Umoya United	9	(0)
2024-	Christchurch United	9	(0)
- * Club domestic league appearances and goals as of 4 February 2025

Travis Graham (born 8 May 1993) is a South African soccer player who plays as a midfielder for Christchurch United in the New Zealand National League. He is a product of Ajax Cape Town's youth academy, and was first called up for the senior squad in July 2012. In his first season as a senior squad member he played 13 times making his debut against in a 3-1 defeat against Moroka Swallows, and getting a yellow card. He played for Ajax for the next six years until his release on 1 July 2018. He was without a club until 21 February 2019, where he was signed by Cape Town City. He only played one game and was released at the end of the season. He signed for Cape Umoya United on 24 February 2020. He left the club on 1 October, but was quickly signed by Maritzburg on 4 December 2020.

Graham won the MTN 8 playing for Cape Town City in 2019 and in 2015 playing for Ajax.
