= Toriq Losper =

South African soccer player

Personal information
- Full name: Mogammat Toriq Losper
- Date of birth: 14 April 1992 (age 34)
- Place of birth: Cape Town, South Africa
- Position: Midfielder

Team information
- Current team: Cape Town Spurs
- Number: 33

Youth career
- Kenpark FC
- 2003–2012: Ajax Cape Town

Senior career*
Years	Team	Apps	(Gls)
2012–2015	Ajax Cape Town	93	(7)
2014–2015	→ Bidvest Wits (loan)	8	(0)
2018	Baroka	1	(0)
2019–	Cape Umoya United	5	(0)
- * Club domestic league appearances and goals as of 19:44, 28 May 2019 (UTC)

Toriq Losper (born 14 April 1992) is a South African football player who plays as a midfielder for Cape Umoya United.
