= Jan Pruijn =

Dutch football coach (born 1958)

Personal information
- Date of birth: 12 October 1958 (age 68)
- Place of birth: Elst, Gelderland, Netherlands

Managerial career
- Years: Team
- De Treffers
- 1991–1994: N.E.C.
- 1994–1995: De Treffers
- 1995–1996: Helmond Sport
- 2009: Ajax Cape Town
- 2012–2013: Ajax Cape Town

Jan Pruijn (born 12 October 1958) is a Dutch football coach.

== Career ==
As a footballer, Jan Pruijn only played amateur football, playing in the Hoofdklasse the highest league of amateur football in the Netherlands.

In 1985, he became the coach of De Treffers from Groesbeek, with whom he won the championship in the Zondag Hoofdklasse C league three times, also winning the championship of the whole amateur league once.

Between 1991 and 1994 he was the coach of N.E.C., being promoted to the Eredivisie and making it to the final of the KNVB Cup in 1994.

Pruijn then managed De Treffers for one more year, followed by a season as manager for Helmond Sport.

After this coaching period, he became a football consultant for clubs such as Urawa Red Diamonds, Real Sociedad, FC Porto and FC Basel, and a couple of clubs from England. He opened up youth camps in the United States, and was youth coach in various countries, coaching at Lebanese football clubs, Dutch clubs, AFC Ajax, VV Venray and Al Ain FC.

In 1999, he was employed by AFC Ajax as the manager of the international youth system, working with the academies in Ghana, Belgium and South Africa. In 2008, he succeeded Hans Vonk as the technical director at Ajax Cape Town. In October 2009 he was briefly the interim manager for Ajax Cape Town following a brief interim stint by Muhsin Ertuğral. Jan Pruijn was relieved at the Cape club by Foppe de Haan, to whom Jan would become the assistant, leading Ajax CT to second place in the South African PSL that season.

In late 2012, Jan Pruijn occupied another interim coaching position at Ajax CT, succeeding Wilfred Mugeyi's interim position, following the dismissal of Maarten Stekelenburg as coach of Ajax Cape Town. He was relieved by Jan Versleijen who took over as interim coach, before resigning prematurely, and Muhsin Ertuğral finishing the season with Ajax CT after being appointed Technical director of the Cape club.
