= Wilfred Mugeyi =

Zimbabwean footballer and manager (born 1969)

Personal information
- Full name: Wilfred Tichaona Mugeyi
- Date of birth: 4 July 1969 (age 57)
- Place of birth: Salisbury, Rhodesia
- Position: Midfielder

Senior career*
Years	Team	Apps	(Gls)
1992–1993	Black Aces	58	(22)
1993–1994	Bush Bucks	?	(?)
1994–1995	Maccabi Haifa	12	(2)
1995–2000	Bush Bucks	142	(76)
2000	Shenyang Haishi	0	(0)
2000–2003	Bush Bucks	144	(52)
2003–2006	Ajax Cape Town	45	(13)
2006–2007	Free State Stars	12	(5)
Total		425	(170)

International career
1992–2004	Zimbabwe	10	(1)

Managerial career
- 2007–2012: Ajax Cape Town (assistant)
- 2012: Ajax Cape Town
- 2013: Chippa United
- 2013–2014: AmaZulu (assistant)
- 2014: AmaZulu
- * Club domestic league appearances and goals

Wilfred Mugeyi (born 4 July 1969) is a Zimbabwean former footballer whose last job was coach at South African Premier Soccer League club AmaZulu FC.

During his playing days he was known as "Silver Fox" for the way he stole un-noticed behind opposition defences.

He enjoyed a long spell at South African side Bush Bucks, a club he first joined in 1993, and also a international career with Zimbabwe.

Mugeyi took South African football by storm when he scooped three top awards, PSL Player of the Year, Player's Player of the Year and Top Goalscorer of the Season back in 1996/97 when he scored 23 goals for Bucks.

He has also had spells in Israel and China, where he played for Maccabi Haifa and Shenyang Haishi respectively.

His twin brother William Mugeyi was also a professional footballer who played for Bush Bucks and Zimbabwe.

Since 2007 after retiring from professional football as a player, Wilfred Mugeyi became an assistant coach at his former club Ajax Cape Town having served as an assistant to Craig Rosslee, Muhsin Ertuğral, Foppe de Haan and finally Maarten Stekelenburg.

On 2 October 2012, Wilfred Mugeyi briefly took over as interim Manager of Ajax Cape Town, following the dismissal of Maarten Stekelenburg, before himself being relieved by Jan Pruijn and finally Jan Versleijen to conclude the 2012/13 PSL season for Ajax CT.

On 29 January 2013 it was announced that Wilfred Mugeyi would take over as head coach of Chippa United.

On 12 December 2014 Wilfred left AmaZulu as manager of the club.
