= 2015 MTN 8 =

Tournament details
- Country: South Africa
- Teams: 8

Final positions
- Champions: Ajax Cape Town
- Runners-up: Kaizer Chiefs

Tournament statistics
- Matches played: 9

The 2015 MTN 8 was the 41st edition of South Africa's annual soccer cup competition, the MTN 8. It featured the top eight teams of the Premier Soccer League at the end of the 2014-15 season.

== Teams ==
The eight teams that competed in the MTN 8 knockout competition are (listed according to their finishing position in the 2014/2015 Premier Soccer League Season):

1. Kaizer Chiefs
2. Mamelodi Sundowns
3. Bidvest Wits
4. Orlando Pirates
5. Ajax Cape Town
6. SuperSport United
7. Bloemfontein Celtic
8. Maritzburg United

== Results ==
=== Quarter-finals ===
4 August 2015
19:30

Orlando Pirates	0–1	Ajax Cape Town
		55' Mdabuka

Orlando Stadium, Johannesburg
4 August 2015
19:30

Bidvest Wits	3–1 (a.e.t.)	Supersport United
Vilakazi 2'; Klate 99'; Botes 101'		56' Brockie

Bidvest Stadium, Johannesburg
5 August 2015
19:30

Mamelodi Sundowns	1–1 (a.e.t.)	Bloemfontein Celtic
Razak 105'		118' Bilankulu
Penalties
	2-4

Lucas Moripe Stadium, Pretoria
5 August 2015
19:30

Kaizer Chiefs	5–3 (a.e.t.)	Maritzburg United
Lebese 46'; Parker 52'; Lebese 63'; Xulu 114'; Ekstein 120'		45' Teyise; 83' Xulu

FNB Stadium, Johannesburg

=== Semi-finals ===
==== 1st leg ====
15 August 2015
20:15

Ajax Cape Town	1–1	Bidvest Wits
Losper 11'		74' Botes

Coetzenburg Stadium, Stellenbosch
16 August 2015
15:00

Bloemfontein Celtic	1–1	Kaizer Chiefs
Lebese 42'		63' Parker

Free State Stadium, Bloemfontein

==== 2nd leg ====
29 August 2015
20:15

Kaizer Chiefs	1–0	Bloemfontein Celtic
Lebese 42'

FNB Stadium, Johannesburg
30 August 2015
15:00

Bidvest Wits	0–1	Ajax Cape Town
		25' Paulse

Bidvest Stadium, Johannesburg

=== Final ===
19 September 2015
15:00

Ajax Cape Town	1–0	Kaizer Chiefs
Paulse 56'

Nelson Mandela Bay Stadium, Port Elizabeth
