= Mamelodi =

- Mams
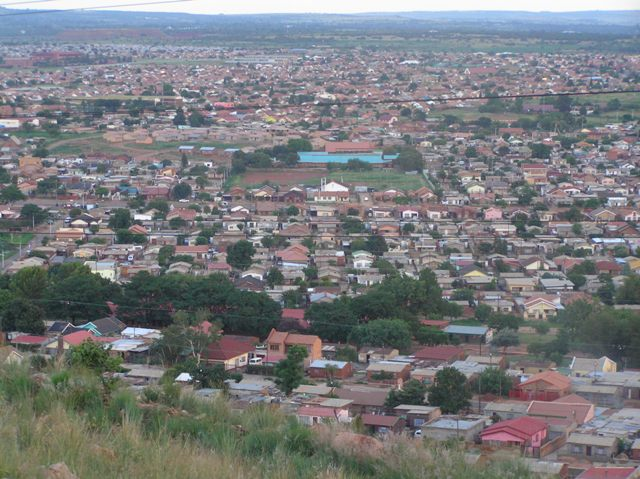
- Mamelodi

- Location within Gauteng Location within South Africa Location within Africa
- Coordinates: 25°42′08″S 28°19′39″E
- Country: South Africa
- Province: Gauteng
- Municipality: City of Tshwane
- Established: 1945

Area
  - Total: 45.19 km^{2} (17.45 sq mi)

Population (2024)
  - Total: 1,500,000
  - Density: 33,000/km^{2} (86,000/sq mi)

Racial makeup (2011)
  - Black African: 98.9%
  - Coloured: 0.4%
  - Indian/Asian: 0.2%
  - White: 0.1%
  - Other: 0.3%

First languages (2011)
  - Northern Sotho: 42.3%
  - Zulu: 12.2%
  - Tsonga: 10.7%
  - S. Ndebele: 8.8%
  - Other: 26.0%
- Time zone: UTC+2 (SAST)
- Postal code (street): 0122
- PO box: 0101
- Area code: +27 (0)12
- Website: www.powerfulone.webs.com

Mamelodi is a township northeast of Pretoria, Gauteng, South Africa. A part of the City of Tshwane Metropolitan Municipality, it was set up by the then apartheid government in 1953.

== Etymology ==
"Mamelodi" is the name derived from the Sepedi word with the prefix being "ma" meaning mother, and the suffix "melodi" meaning melodies. Its meaning can be translated to mean Mother of Whistles.

== History ==
The township was established when 16 houses were built on the farm Vlakfontein in June 1953 due to Apartheid, it is where they were forced to settle and later the name changed to Mamelodi. The Group Areas Act designated Mamelodi as a blacks-only area, though this became moot with the fall of Apartheid in 1994. In the 1960s black citizens were forcefully removed from the suburb of Lady Selbourne in Pretoria to Mamelodi, Ga-Rankuwa and Atteridgeville. Anti-apartheid activist Reverend Nico Smith preached in Mamelodi from 1982 to 1989, and obtained permission to live there himself from 1985 to 1989. During that period, he and his wife Ellen were the only whites legally allowed to live in Mamelodi. The township still has vastly more blacks than any other group as of 2010.

Since 2001 Mamelodi has had a large AIDS outreach program helping several thousand orphans in the community. Mamelodi is home to the largest AIDS Hospice Center in South Africa with 140 beds available free of charge.

== Education ==
=== Primary schools ===
- Mononong Primary School
- Moretele Primary School
- Agnes Chidi Primary School
- Dr Monare Primary School
- Mveledzo Primary School
- Sikhanyisele Primary School
- Meetse A Bophelo Primary School
- Mogale Primary School
- Bula-Dikgoro School
- Ramahlale Primary School
- Bajabulile Primary School
- Pula-difate Primary School
- Tlakukani Primary School
- F.F. Ribeiro Primary School
- Rethakgetse Primary School
- Emasangweni Primary School
- Tlakukani Primary School

- N'wavangani Primary School
- Mahlasedi Masana Primary School
- Boikgantsho Primary School
- Motheo Primary School
- Zakhele Primary school
- Botlhabatsatsi Primary School
- Zamintuthuko Primary School
- Umthombo Primary School
- Ezazi Primary School
- Tshimollo Primary School
- Ndima Primary School
- Sindawonye Primary School
- Pheladi Nakene Primary School
- Agnes Chidi Primary School
- Koos Matli Primary School
- Dr I.M Monare Primary School
- Uaone Primary school
- Mahube Valley Primary School
- Shirinda Primary School
- Emthunzini Primary School
- legora primary school
- Somisanang Primary School
- Morakoma Primary School
- Balebogeng Primary School
- Pfundzo Ndi Tshedza Primary School

=== Secondary and high schools ===
- Mamelodi Secondary School
- Tsako-Thabo Secondary School
- Stanza Bopape Secondary School (previously known as Rethabile Secondary School)
- Vukani Mawethu Secondary School
- Vlakfontein Secondary School
- Bona Lesedi Secondary School
- Gatang Secondary School
- Jafta Mahlangu Secondary School
- Solomon Mahlangu Secondary School
- Rephafukgile Secondary School
- Mahube Valley Secondary School
- Ribane Laka maths science and ICT school of specialisation
- Modiri Technical High School
- Lehlabile High School
- J.Kekana High School
- Phateng Comprehensive School
- Lesedi Secondary School
- Nellmapius Secondary School(located in Nellmapius)
- Thuto-bohlale Secondary(located in Nellmapius)

=== Notable National Senior Certificate achievers ===
The National Senior Certificate (NSC) examinations in South Africa are the final school-leaving assessments administered by the Department of Basic Education. Each year, learners who achieve outstanding results are recognised as top achievers at both provincial and national levels. In Gauteng, learners from township areas such as Mamelodi and Nellmapius have been among those recognised for strong academic performance, particularly in the categories of overall achievement and subject-specific excellence.

- Tatenda Paurosi (Jafta Mahlangu Secondary School)
- Agnes Mailula (Stanza Bopape Secondary School)
- Lebogang Selepe (Phateng Comprehensive School)
- Enrique Alvino Hlatshwayo-Mentor (Nellmapius Secondary School)
- Admire Gwatinyanya (Nellmapius Secondary School)
- Mawzi Thuto (Rephafogile Secondary School)

=== Tertiary education ===
Tshwane North TVET College has 6 campuses, one of which is based in the east of Mamelodi in the section called BufferZone, next to Mamelodi Day Hospital. It used to be called Thuto Matlhale, then changed to Mamelodi College and now known after the merge as TNC Mamelodi Campus.

The University of Pretoria operates a campus in Mamelodi. The campus in Mamelodi was incorporated from Vista University into the University of Pretoria on 2 January 2004 as part of a government reshuffle of smaller institutions into larger ones.

The U.S. Embassy operates the Mae Jemison Science Reading Room in Mamelodi. This stand-alone building on the University of Pretoria campus has a small library, computers, and an auditorium. It is used for after-school reading, tutoring, and other activities by students in Mamelodi.

== Society and culture ==
=== Social organisations ===
There are different organisations and groups that are working towards improving the standard of living and education levels within the township. One of them is Tateni Community Care Services, funded in 1995, which operates 10 Drop-in Centres, mostly in primary schools, to support young children. Furthermore, they have a youth development program to support youth in-and-out-of-school to work towards their "Breaking the Cycle of Poverty" approach. Another organization The Mamelodi Trust operates within five schools in the area. The Mamelodi Initiative, was founded in 2007 by Richard Kelly and Seikanelo Sedibane and it was launched in 2010, it focuses on providing after-school and out-of-school time programming to Mamelodi residents through winter and summer holiday programmes, year-round computer courses, youth mentoring, and other opportunities for youth.The Itsoseng Clinic was established in 1995 and continues to deliver a comprehensive psychological service to the local residents. The Historical Society of Mamelodi aim to capture the history of Mamelodi digitally.

=== Sport ===
The township is home to the Mamelodi Sundowns of the 14X Premier League Champions and the Mamelodi Bees Basketball of the South African Women's Basketball League.

The HM Pitje Stadium is located in Mamelodi.

Mamelodi is also home to Mamelodi Sundowns star George Lebese Terrence Mashego Sifiso Ngobeni and Lucky Mohomi of Mamelodi Sundowns.

Mamelodi is also home to the 2003 Miss South Africa Joan Ramagoshi.

=== Life in Mamelodi ===
There are a lot of informal settlements in Mamelodi. The housing problem is so great in the area, but it is proving impossible to keep up with the demand. The rates of youth unemployment and drug use are high.

=== Crime ===
Crime is also a major problem facing the community with poverty, unemployment and social issues being the major contributors. The community has been in the news for all the wrong reasons, like looting during strikes and destruction of public properties with the aim to get the attention of the government to speed up service delivery.

=== Outreach ===
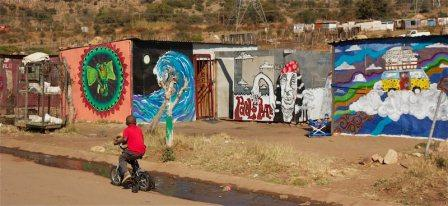
Part of Mamelodi's "Living Art Gallery"

One major outreach program in Mamelodi is the Viva Foundation. Viva works to support orphans and vulnerable children, as well as giving community members business and skills training. Viva's Mamelodi compound is host to a preschool, small store, kitchen, and safe house for orphans. Viva has also worked to produce a "living art gallery" by painting several homes surrounding the compound.

Another major outreach project situated on the University of Pretoria Mamelodi Campus is the Itsoseng Clinic, a psychological clinic providing free psychological services to the community of Pretoria. The Clinic is a project of the University of Pretoria's Department of Psychology and is in operation since 1994. The clinic collaborates with other helping services, i.e. policing services, hospitals, crisis centers, orphanages, hospices, etc. in the community to address issues related to poverty, crime, unemployment, such as substance and alcohol abuse, domestic violence, HIV/Aids related issues and learning and other difficulties. This is the only psychological facility in the community offering free services to the community. Services are provided by volunteers, students, interns and professional university staff.

=== Monuments ===
Solomon Mahlangu is commemorated in the Solomon Mahlangu Freedom Square in his hometown of Mamelodi, Pretoria. The square is focused on a bronze statue of Mahlangu. It is located in well maintained parklands on the corner of Maphalla Drive and Tsamaya Avenue.

== Notable residents ==
- Daniel Mudau
- Don Laka
- Fabian Ribeiro
- Edward Motale
- Fortunate Mafeta Phaka
- George Lebese
- Leraro Kgoatle
- Naledi Chirwa
- Philip Tabane
- Sello Maduma
- Solomon Mahlangu (1956–1979)
- Terence Mashego
- Vusi Mahlasela
- Caesarina Kona Makhoere
- Kate Serokolo
