= Caesarina Kona Makhoere =

South African anti-apartheid activist and prison writer (born 1955)

- Born: 1955 (age 70–71) near Pretoria, Union of South Africa
- Education: Vlakfontein Technical High School
- Occupations: anti-apartheid activist and prison writer
- Notable work: No Child’s Play: In Prison Under Apartheid (1988)

Caesarina Kona Makhoere (born 1955) is a former South African anti-apartheid activist and prison writer, known for her work No Child's Play: In Prison Under Apartheid (1988).

== Biography ==
Makhoere was born near Pretoria in 1955 and attended Vlakfontein Technical High School. Her father was a policeman and her mother worked in domestic service, and Makhoere was one of seven children. Alongside her family, she was forcibly removed under the terms of the Group Areas Act and relocated to Mamelodi as a child.

Makoere became associated with the resistance organisation Black Sash. She was arrested in October 1976 as an "agitator" under the Terrorism Act, then spent ten months detained in Silverton Police Station, Mamelodi, Gauteng, awaiting trial. In 1977, she was convicted for attempting to undergo military training in order to resist legislation that school classes throughout South Africa were to be taught in Afrikaans.

In 1982, alongside fellow imprisoned anti-apartheid activists Elizabeth Komikie Gumede, Thandi Modise, Elizabeth Nhlapo and Kate Serokolo, Makhoere made an application to the Minister of Justice, Kobie Coetsee, hoping to have their isolation declared illegal and to improve their living conditions. This was denied, but she was released from prison in October 1982. After her release, she lived in hiding and later studied towards a business degree.

Makhoere also become a prison literature author, writing No Child's Play: In Prison Under Apartheid (1988) about her experiences in prison. In the book, she describes her time imprisoned, represents her body as a weapon in political battles (both inside and outside prison), and uses the plural pronoun we to identify herself with other incarcerated activists. According to Ryan, Makhoere 's book "epitomized" the South African "writing of resistance."
