= Fortunate Mafeta Phaka =

South African environmental scientist

- Born: 12 July 1987 (age 39); Mamelodi, South Africa
- Other name: The Scribe
- Education: University of South Africa North-West University Hasselt University
- Awards: Mail & Guardian 200 Young South Africans (2016) South African Breweries Environmental Media Awards and Environmentalist of the Year (2019) Mail & Guardian Greening the Future Award (2022) Golden Shield Heritage Award (2022)
- Scientific career
- Fields: Herpetology Environmental science Biocultural diversity research
- Thesis: Biocultural diversity of herpetofauna in South Africa: State and relevance as a science-based policy tool for conservation and social inclusion (2022)
- Doctoral advisor: Louis du Preez, Jean Hugè and Maarten Vanhove

Fortunate Phaka (born July 12, 1987, in Mamelodi) is a South African environmental scientist, author, environmental television producer and science communicator. He is best known for research focused on herptiles, studying the relationship between biodiversity and people's cultural diversity, and writing South Africa's first comprehensive wildlife guide for frogs to be jointly published in an Indigenous language (IsiZulu) and English. His academic affiliations for postdoctoral research are with South Africa's North-West University and the South African Institute for Aquatic Biodiversity, as well as Belgium's Hasselt University. Phaka is also on the board of directors for Youth 4 African Wildlife, a youth-focused wildlife conservation non-profit organisation operating in Southern Africa. Phaka also has a superhero scientist, called The Scribe, based on him and his work.

== Early life and education ==
Phaka spent most of his childhood in Mamelodi township on the outskirts of Pretoria and his ancestral village of Kgotsoro in the Limpopo province. He attended part of high school at Meridian College. After matriculating, he completed his undergraduate studies at the University of South Africa. His Honours and Master's degrees were obtained from the North-West University in 2016 and 2018 respectively. He then graduated with a joint PhD in 2022 from North-West University and Hasselt University under the mentorship of professors Louis du Preez, Jean Hugè and Maarten Vanhove.

== Career ==
=== Frog book and scientific publications ===
From 2016, Phaka's research has focused on investigating biodiversity and the complex relationship it has with people's cultural diversity with the aim of understanding how South African traditional cultural practices that are based on herptiles can be used to inform policy for socially inclusive conservation planning as South Africa's environmental law envisaged. The first output of Phaka's biocultural diversity inspired approach to herpetology was the field guide titled A Bilingual Field Guide to the Frogs of Zululand which was developed in collaboration with Amazulu of the Zululand region, phrased according to how the community perceived anuran diversity and published in English and Isizulu as the most widely spoken language in the region. Subsequent to this book, Phaka has produced scientific literature whose highlights include showing a link between the cultural importance of wildlife and the accumulation of biodiversity data for that wildlife, cataloguing herptile species in South Africa's urban traditional medicine markets using DNA barcoding, and initiating the compilation of a comprehensive list of Indigenous language names for South Africa's ≈550 herptile species.

==== Books ====
- A Bilingual Field Guide to the Frogs of Zululand (or Isiqondiso Sasefilidini Esindimimbili Ngamaxoxo AkwelaKwaZulu in IsiZulu), 2017 (ISBN 9781928224198)

==== Selected scientific publications ====
- Phaka, Fortunate M., et al. "Naming South African frogs and reptiles in nine Indigenous languages." African journal of herpetology (2025): 1–18. https://doi.org/10.1080/21564574.2024.2441663
- Phaka, Fortunate M., et al. "Folk taxonomy and indigenous names for frogs in Zululand, South Africa." Journal of ethnobiology and ethnomedicine 15.1 (2019): 1–8. https://doi.org/10.1186/s13002-019-0294-3
- Phaka, Fortunate Mafeta, and Dax Ovid. "Life sciences reading material in vernacular: lessons from developing a bilingual (IsiZulu and English) book on South African frogs." Current Issues in Language Planning 23.1 (2022): 96–111. https://doi.org/10.1080/14664208.2021.1936397
- Phaka, Fortunate M., et al. "Reviewing taxonomic bias in a megadiverse country: primary biodiversity data, cultural salience, and scientific interest of South African animals." Environmental Reviews 30.1 (2022): 39–49. https://doi.org/10.1139/er-2020-0092
- Ovid, Dax, and Fortunate Mafeta Phaka. "Idwi, Xenopus laevis, and African clawed frog: Teaching counternarratives of invasive species in postcolonial ecology." The Journal of Environmental Education 53.2 (2022): 69–86. https://doi.org/10.1080/00958964.2022.2032564
- Phaka, Fortunate M., et al. "Library books as environmental management capacity building opportunities exclude most South African languages." Environmental Science & Policy 141 (2023): 61–68. https://doi.org/10.1016/j.envsci.2022.12.020

=== Conservation career ===
Phaka began his conservation career in 2006 as a volunteer at the South African National Zoological Gardens during his undergraduate years. After obtaining his undergraduate degree he became a conservation intern for Youth 4 African Wildlife in 2014 and through the years progressed to be the organisation's project leader, project director, then eventually became elected as one of the board members. Through the organisation Phaka has been involved with Big 5 conservation through fundraising, science communication, teaching, poaching prevention, and advocacy.

=== Television career ===
Due to the cost of undergraduate studies being too high for his mother to afford by herself, Phaka dropped out to learn wildlife documentary filmmaking in 2009 and afterwards he was hired as the trainee researcher/producer for South Africa's longest running environmental TV show, 50. Subsequently, Phaka worked various roles as a freelancer in the television industry and produced his first environmental documentary, commissioned by 50|50, titled 'Green Darkies' in 2011. Phaka then returned to the University of South Africa to complete his undergraduate studies while still working freelance in the TV industry to help his mother pay for his studies. The TV experience he gained inspired his science communication involvement as he continued with postgraduate studies. His TV production skills and research focus on biodiversity's relationship with people's cultures was combined in 2020 when he was the content producer for Imvelogy; a TV show that aired on SABC2 which explored environmental issues from the perspective of South Africa's Indigenous cultures.

==== Filmography ====
Year	Title	Role	Notes
2010	50/50	Trainee Producer/Researcher	Environmental TV series
2010	Life and Wonder of Odonata	Script Advisor	Wildlife Documentary
2011	Green Darkies	Director	Short documentary for Environmental TV series
2011–2013	50/50	Freelancer	Environmental TV series
2014	Not on my Watch	Producer and screenWriter	Wildlife Documentary
2020–2021	Imvelogy	Content Producer	Environmental TV series

=== Outreach and policy ===
The research produced by Phaka generally has recommendations that inform integrative conservation approaches. In 2020 Phaka started an initiative to communicate herptile knowledge in South Africa's 9 officialised Indigenous languages as the country's wildlife field guides are mostly published in English with comparatively fewer being published in Afrikaans. He has also written a technical brief based on his research meant to demonstrate to South African policymakers how Indigenous people's perspectives can be incorporated into conservation policy. Some of the Indigenous South African language names coined for frogs through Phaka's work appear on online information sources, such as the iselesele page on Zulu Wikipedia and AmphibiaWeb, next to English and scientific names.

=== Awards and honours ===
Phaka received multiple honours for his commitment to research that is inclusive of Indigenous South African cultural practices as these are practices of people who are generally marginalised from issues relating to South Africa's natural environment and conservation planning generally does not consider their perspectives.

2022: Mail & Guardian Greening the Future Award

2022: Enviropeadia's Ecologic Award (Runner-up for Eco-Angel category)

2022: Golden Shield Heritage Award (Runner-up for 'Voice of Heritage' category)

2020: Enviropeadia's Ecologic Award (First prize for Eco-Angel category)

2019: Environmental Community Award (South African Breweries Environmental Media Awards and Environmentalist of the Year)

2019: One of the 100 Young Mandelas of the Future (Curated by News24)

2018: National Wetland Indaba Young Professional Award

2017: Future Leader of Amphibian Conservation Award (Amphibian Conservation Research Symposium)

2016: One of the Mail & Guardian 200 Young South Africans
