= Uzair Essack =

South African businessman

- Born: 1992 (age 33–34); Mayfair, Johannesburg, South Africa
- Education: University of Cape Town
- Occupation: Entrepreneur
- Known for: Founder and CEO of Riyp

Uzair Essack is a South African entrepreneur. He was listed in the Forbes Africa 30 Under 30 entrepreneurs of 2020.

== Background ==
Uzair Essack was born in Mayfair, Johannesburg in 1992. He attained a Bachelor of Commerce degree at the University of Cape Town in 2017.

== Career ==
Uzair founded Riyp (Pty) Ltd on 8 December 2015, a South African fresh produce export company based in Cape Town. Riyp exports fresh fruit and vegetables to 40 countries across Africa, the Middle East, Asia, Europe and the Indian Ocean Islands. The company operates three export brands: Riyp, Bloo Moon and Cherry Pop. Riyp is a member of the Fresh Produce Exporters Forum (FPEF).

In 2019, he was awarded the Medium Business Entrepreneur of The Year award at the South Africa Entrepreneur of the Year Awards.

In 2020, Uzair Essack was named in the Mail & Guardian 200 Young South Africans list and in the Forbes Africa 30 Under 30 class of 2020.

Riyp has been featured in CNN, Forbes Africa, GQ South Africa, and Entrepreneur Magazine.
