= Jan Versleijen =

Dutch association football player and manager

Personal information
- Full name: Johannes Martinus Maria Versleijen
- Date of birth: 29 December 1955 (age 70)
- Place of birth: Venlo, Netherlands

Managerial career
- Years: Team
- 1982–1984: FC Wageningen
- 1990–1993: Go Ahead Eagles
- 1993–1994: De Graafschap
- 1994–1995: Dordrecht '90
- 1995–1996: VVV-Venlo
- 1997–1998: JEF United Ichihara
- 1999–2000: TOP Oss
- 2000: Netherlands U17 & Netherlands U21
- 2000–2001: VVV-Venlo
- 2001–2003: Al-Jazira
- 2003–2004: Ettifaq
- 2004–2005: Al-Shaab
- 2005–2006: Ettifaq
- 2006–2007: Al-Jazira
- 2007–2008: Al-Wehda
- 2008–2011: Australia U-17
- 2008–2011: Australia U-20
- 2012: Henan Construction
- 2013: Ajax Cape Town
Medal record
Representing Australia (as manager)
Men's Association football
AFC U-20 Asian Cup
Runner-up	2010 China

Johannes Martinus Maria Versleijen (born 29 December 1955), better known as Jan Versleijen, is a Dutch professional association football coach who last managed South African PSL side Ajax Cape Town.

== Career ==
Born in Venlo, Versleijen has managed a number teams in his native Netherlands, including FC Wageningen, Go Ahead Eagles, De Graafschap, Dordrecht '90, VVV-Venlo and TOP Oss. Versleijen has also coached throughout Asia, managing teams in Japan (JEF United Chiba), the United Arab Emirates (Al-Jazira and Al-Shaab), and in Saudi Arabia (Ettifaq and Al-Wehda).

He was appointed manager of the Australian under-20 national team in June 2008.

In November 2011, Versleijen, after three and a half years and one Under 17, two under 20 World Cup cycles, decided not to re-apply for a position in Australia's youth set up, after the FFA restructures his old role, splitting it into two positions.

In January 2013, after the dismissal of Maarten Stekelenburg, and the interim managerial positions of both Wilfred Mugeyi and Jan Pruijn for Ajax Cape Town, Versleijen took over as the third care taker for the Cape club, intended to see the South African club through until the end of the 2012-13 Premier Soccer League season.

On 24 April 2013, Versleijen announced his early resignation from his interim coaching position at Ajax Cape Town, leaving the Cape club while placed in the relegation zone, just ahead of their derby match against crosstown rivals Chippa United. His reason for leaving the club was due to the hiring of Muhsin Ertuğral as the newly appointed Technical Director at the Cape club without his knowledge.

== Managerial statistics ==
Team	From	To	Record				
Team	From	To	G	W	D	L	Win %
JEF United Ichihara	1997	1998	66	20	0	46	30.30
Total			66	20	0	46	30.30

== Honours ==
=== Manager ===
Australia U-20

- AFC U-20 Asian Cup: runner-up 2010
