= Elizabeth Komikie Gumede =

South African anti-apartheid activist (1921 – 2016)

- Born: 28 October 1921; Christiana, South Africa
- Died: 1 August 2016 (age 95); Soweto, Gauteng, South Africa
- Occupation: anti-apartheid activist
- Organization(s): Azanian People's Liberation Army, Pan Africanist Congress of Azania
- Relatives: Kate Serokolo (niece)

Elizabeth Komikie Gumede (née Ndlovu, 28 October 1921 – 1 August 2016) was a South African anti-apartheid activist.

== Biography ==
Gumede was born in 1921 in Christiana, South Africa.

Gumede was an anti-apartheid activist as a member and operative of the Azanian People's Liberation Army (APLA), the underground military wing of the Pan Africanist Congress of Azania. With John Ganya and Nabboth Ntshuntsha she recruited people to the party, sent them to neighbouring countries for military training and received them when they infiltrated the country.

In 1978, Gumede, then in her late 50s, and her niece Kate Serokolo were arrested and were sentenced to five years in prison under the Suppression of Communism Act for assisting the guerrilla fighters. Gumede was transferred to several different prisons, including Potchefstroom, and Kroonstad (where she met fellow activists Thandi Modise and Winnie Mandela), but was often held in solitary confinement and was tortured. According to the International Defence and Aid Fund for Southern Africa, Gumede was considered to be the female political prisoner in South Africa in this period who suffered the most severe torture and ill-treatment. She would scream from pain in her cell for long periods and her left hand became paralysed as a result of the torture that she had been subjected to.

In 1982, Gumede alongside Caesarina Kona Makhoere, Thandi Modise, Elizabeth Nhlapo and Kate Serokolo made an application to the South African Minister of Justice, Kobie Coetsee, hoping to have their isolation declared illegal and to improve their living conditions. This was denied.

Gumede was granted the Order of Mendi for Bravery in Bronze by the President of South Africa in 2006 "for bravely contributing to the struggle against apartheid."

She lived in Chiawelo, Soweto, Gauteng, and died in 2016. Her son Daniel Mofokeng became a major general in the South African National Defence Force.
