= Louis du Preez =

South African professor of zoology

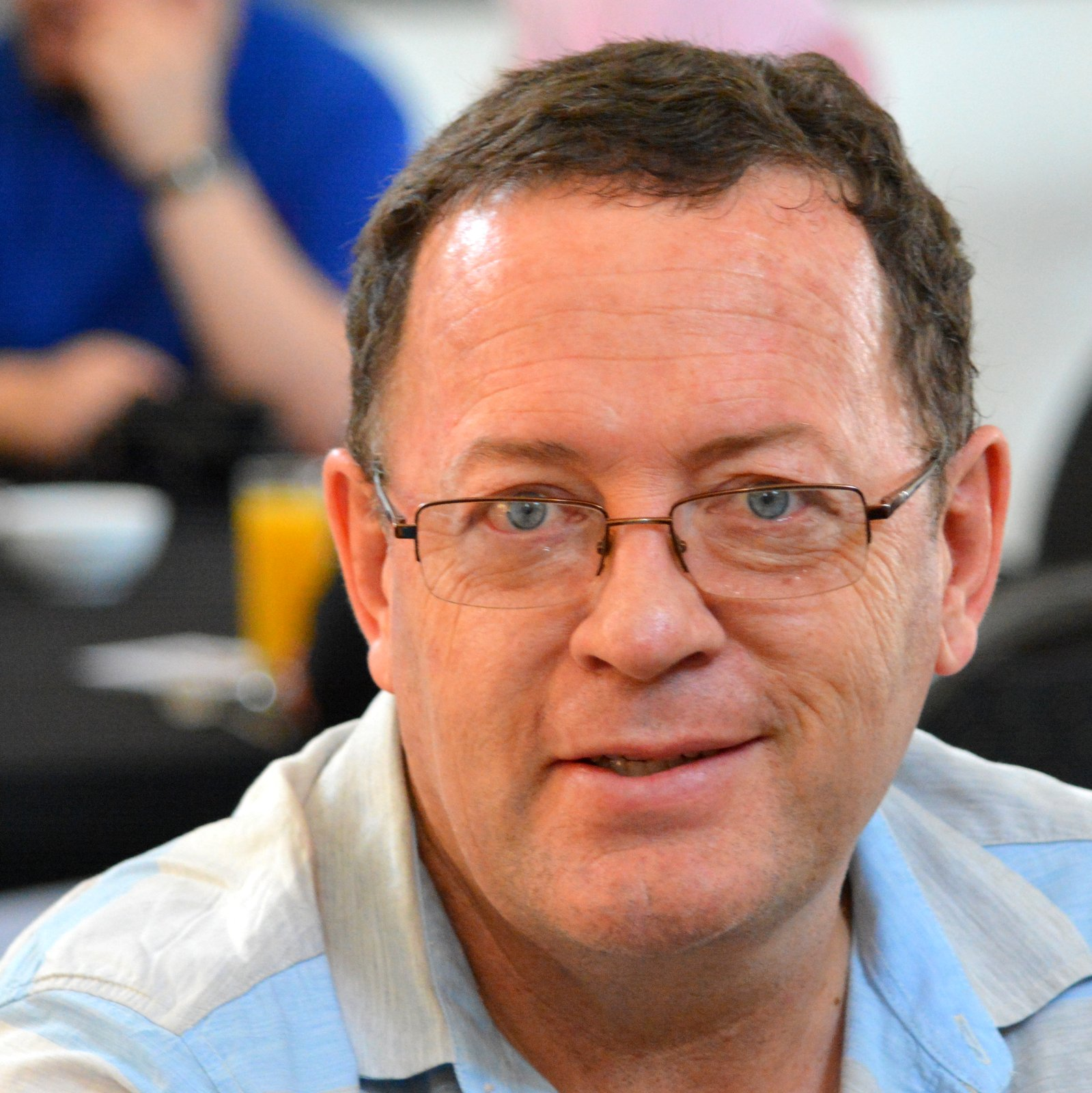
- Louis Du Preez at the International Symposium on Monogenea in Brno (2017)
- Born: 9 July 1962; Ficksburg, South Africa
- Education: University of the Free State
- Scientific career
- Fields: parasitology herpetology
- Workplaces: North-West University
- Thesis: Study of factors influencing the nature and extent of host-specificity among polystomatids (Polystomatidae: Monogenoidea) parasitic in Anura of southern Africa (1994)

Louis Heyns Du Preez (born 9 July 1962) is a South African professor of zoology who specialises in parasitology and herpetology at the North-West University. Du Preez is best known for his research on South African frog species, writing a widely used wildlife guide for the frogs of Southern Africa, and contributions to global parasitology with special focus studies on polystome worms. His contributions to polystome research have led to a recently discovered Malagasy frog species, Blommersia dupreezi, being named in his honour.

== Biography ==
Du Preez grew up in Ficksburg and started his tertiary education at the University of the Free State located in the same province he was brought up. In 1986 he obtained his Master of Science degree with the thesis titled 'Polystoma australis (Monogenea): aspekte van ontwikkeling en gedrag wat betrekking het op rekrutering en vestiging'.

From 1989 to 1990 he was a school teacher in Bloemfontein. From 1991 to 1993 he was Head of the Department of Herpetology at the National Museum in Bloemfontein. In 1994 he obtained a PhD degree from the University of the Free State with a thesis titled 'Study of factors influencing the nature and extent of host-specificity among polystomatids (Polystomatidae: Monogenoidea) parasitic in Anura of southern Africa' under the mentorship of Dawid Kok. Du Preez then progressed to being the Senior Lecturer of Zoology at the University of the Free State from 1996 to 2000. From 2001 to 2004 he was appointed associate professor. In 2002 he established the African Amphibian Research Conservation Group and was later promoted Full Professor of Zoology in 2005 at North-West University. In 2011 du Preez was elected Chair of the Zoology Department at North-West University.

Throughout his career he has conducted research in several countries across the world including France, United States, Nigeria, Brazil and China. He is a member of the Zoological Society of Southern Africa, the Herpetological Association of Africa, the Suid-Afrikaanse Akademie vir Wetenskap en Kuns, the Parasitological Association of Southern Africa and the Microscopy Association of Africa.

== Publications ==
Louis du Preez published several books and over 100 scientific articles. In addition to several parasite, frog, and reptile species that are new to science, du Preez's species descriptions include the frog species Breviceps carruthersi and Breviceps passmorei from the Rain Frog family (Brevicipitidae), and Hyperolius howelli from the Reed Frog family (Hyperoliidae).

=== Books ===
- Field guide and key to the frogs & toads of the Free State, 1996 (ISBN 978-0-86886-549-2)
- Field Guide to the frogs and toads of the Vredefort Dome World Heritage Site, 2006 (ISBN 978-1-86822-517-0)
- Bios: an integrated approach to life sciences teaching and learning, 2007 (ISBN 978-1-920140-06-9)
- A complete guide to the frogs of Southern Africa, 2009; 2015 (ISBN 978-1-77007-446-0)
- Frogs and frogging in South Africa, 2011 (ISBN 978-1-77007-914-4)
- Turtle Polystomes of the world: Neopolystoma, Polystomoidella & Polystomoides, 2011 (ISBN 978-3-639-36517-7)
- A Bilingual Field Guide to the Frogs of Zululand (or Isiqondiso Sasefilidini Esindimimbili Ngamaxoxo AkwelaKwaZulu in IsiZulu), 2017 (ISBN 978-1-928224-19-8)
- Frogs of Southern Africa: a complete guide, 2017 (ISBN 978-1-77584-636-9)

=== Scientific publications ===
- Du Preez, Louis H., and Dawid J. Kok. "Syntopic occurrence of new species of Polystoma and Metapolystoma (Monogenea: Polystomatidae) in Ptychadena porosissima in South Africa." Systematic Parasitology 22.2 (1992): 141–150. doi:10.1007/BF00009606
- Du Preez, Louis H., and Dawid J. Kok. "Supporting experimental evidence of host specificity among southern African polystomes (Polystomatidae: Monogenea)." Parasitology Research 83 (1997): 558–562. doi:10.1007/s004360050297
- Du Preez, LH, and L. H. S. Lim. "Neopolystoma liewi sp. n.(Monogenea: Polystomatidae) from the eye of the Malayan box turtle (Cuora amboinensis)." Folia Parasitologica 47.1 (2000): 11–15. https://folia.paru.cas.cz/pdfs/fol/2000/01/03.pdf
- Verneau, Olivier, et al. "A view of early vertebrate evolution inferred from the phylogeny of polystome parasites (Monogenea: Polystomatidae)." Proceedings of the Royal Society of London. Series B: Biological Sciences 269.1490 (2002): 535–543. doi:10.1098/rspb.2001.1899
- Weldon, Ché, et al. "Origin of the amphibian chytrid fungus." Emerging Infectious Diseases 10.12 (2004): 2100. doi:10.3201/eid1012.030804
- Du Preez, Louis H., and Milton F. Maritz. "Demonstrating morphometric protocols using polystome marginal hooklet measurements." Systematic Parasitology 63.1 (2006): 1–15. doi:10.1007/s11230-005-5496-5
- Mendelson III, Joseph R., et al. "Confronting amphibian declines and extinctions." Science 313.5783 (2006): 48–48. doi:10.1126/science.1128396
- Andreone, Franco, et al. "The challenge of conserving amphibian megadiversity in Madagascar." PLOS Biology 6.5 (2008): e118. doi:10.1371/journal.pbio.0060118
- Du Preez, Louis H., et al. "Reproduction, larval growth, and reproductive development in African clawed frogs (Xenopus laevis) exposed to atrazine." Chemosphere 71.3 (2008): 546–552. doi:10.1016/j.chemosphere.2007.09.051
- Petzold, Alice, et al. "A revision of African helmeted terrapins (Testudines: Pelomedusidae: Pelomedusa), with descriptions of six new species." Zootaxa 3795.5 (2014): 523–548. doi:10.11646/zootaxa.3795.5.2
- Meyer, Leon, et al. "Parasite host-switching from the invasive American red-eared slider, Trachemys scripta elegans, to the native Mediterranean pond turtle, Mauremys leprosa, in natural environments." Aquatic Invasions 10.1 (2015): 79–91. doi:10.3391/ai.2015.10.1.08
- Du Preez, Louis H., and Michelle Van Rooyen. "A new polystomatid (Monogenea, Polystomatidae) from the mouth of the North American freshwater turtle Pseudemys nelsoni." ZooKeys 539 (2015): 1. doi:10.3897/zookeys.539.6108
- Du Preez, Louis H., and Olivier Verneau. "Eye to eye: classification of conjunctival sac polystomes (Monogenea: Polystomatidae) revisited with the description of three new genera Apaloneotrema ng, Aussietrema ng and Fornixtrema ng." Parasitology Research 119.12 (2020): 4017–4031. doi:10.1007/s00436-020-06888-w
- Du Preez, Louis Heyns, Marcus Vinícius Domingues, and Olivier Verneau. "Classification of pleurodire polystomes (Platyhelminthes, Monogenea, Polystomatidae) revisited with the description of two new genera from the Australian and Neotropical Realms." International Journal for Parasitology: Parasites and Wildlife 19 (2022): 180–186. doi:10.1016/j.ijppaw.2022.09.004
- Landman, Willem, et al. "Metapolystoma ohlerianum n. sp.(Monogenea: Polystomatidae) from Aglyptodactylus madagascariensis (Anura: Mantellidae)." Acta Parasitologica (2023): 1–15. doi:10.1007/s11686-023-00668-z
- Verneau, Olivier, Gerald R. Johnston, and Louis Du Preez. "A quantum leap in the evolution of platyhelminths: Host-switching from turtles to hippopotamuses illustrated from a phylogenetic meta-analysis of polystomes (Monogenea, Polystomatidae)." International Journal for Parasitology 53.5–6 (2023): 317–325. doi:10.1016/j.ijpara.2023.03.001

=== Species descriptions ===
Du Preez has described or contributed to the description of at least 24 polystome species, 8 polystome genera, and more than 10 other non-polystome parasite species that have frogs or reptiles as their hosts. In herpetology, du Preez has described or contributed to the description of at least 20 new frog species and 6 reptile species.

==== Amphibians ====
- Breviceps carruthersi Du Preez, Netherlands, and Minter, 2017
- Breviceps passmorei Minter, Netherlands, and Du Preez, 2017
- Gephyromantis cornucopia Miralles, Köhler, Glaw, Wollenberg Valero, Crottini, Rosa, Du Preez, Gehring, Vieites, Ratsoavina, and Vences, 2023
- Gephyromantis feomborona Miralles, Köhler, Glaw, Wollenberg Valero, Crottini, Rosa, Du Preez, Gehring, Vieites, Ratsoavina, and Vences, 2023
- Gephyromantis fiharimpe Vences, Köhler, Crottini, Hofreiter, Hutter, Du Preez, Preick, Rakotoarison, Rancilhac, Raselimanana, Rosa, Scherz, and Glaw, 2022
- Gephyromantis kremenae Miralles, Köhler, Glaw, Wollenberg Valero, Crottini, Rosa, Du Preez, Gehring, Vieites, Ratsoavina, and Vences, 2023
- Gephyromantis mafifeo Miralles, Köhler, Glaw, Wollenberg Valero, Crottini, Rosa, Du Preez, Gehring, Vieites, Ratsoavina, and Vences, 2023
- Gephyromantis matsilo Vences, Köhler, Crottini, Hofreiter, Hutter, Du Preez, Preick, Rakotoarison, Rancilhac, Raselimanana, Rosa, Scherz, and Glaw, 2022
- Gephyromantis mitsinjo Miralles, Köhler, Glaw, Wollenberg Valero, Crottini, Rosa, Du Preez, Gehring, Vieites, Ratsoavina, and Vences, 2023
- Gephyromantis oelkrugi Vences, Köhler, Crottini, Hofreiter, Hutter, Du Preez, Preick, Rakotoarison, Rancilhac, Raselimanana, Rosa, Scherz, and Glaw, 2022
- Gephyromantis portonae Vences, Köhler, Crottini, Hofreiter, Hutter, Du Preez, Preick, Rakotoarison, Rancilhac, Raselimanana, Rosa, Scherz, and Glaw, 2022
- Gephyromantis pedronoi Vences, Köhler, Andreone, Craul, Crottini, Du Preez, Preick, Rancilhac, Rödel, Scherz, Streicher, Hofreiter, and Glaw, 2021
- Gephyromantis sergei Miralles, Köhler, Glaw, Wollenberg Valero, Crottini, Rosa, Du Preez, Gehring, Vieites, Ratsoavina, and Vences, 2023
- Hyperolius friedemanni Mercurio and Rödel in Channing, Hillers, Lötters, Rödel, Schick, Conradie, Rödder, Mercurio, Wagner, Dehling, Du Preez, Kielgast, and Burger, 2013
- Hyperolius howelli Du Preez and Channing, 2013
- Hyperolius inyangae Channing in Channing, Hillers, Lötters, Rödel, Schick, Conradie, Rödder, Mercurio, Wagner, Dehling, Du Preez, Kielgast, and Burger, 2013
- Hyperolius jacobseni Channing in Channing, Hillers, Lötters, Rödel, Schick, Conradie, Rödder, Mercurio, Wagner, Dehling, Du Preez, Kielgast, and Burger, 2013
- Hyperolius lupiroensis Channing in Channing, Hillers, Lötters, Rödel, Schick, Conradie, Rödder, Mercurio, Wagner, Dehling, Du Preez, Kielgast, and Burger, 2013
- Hyperolius rwandae Dehling, Sinsch, Rodel, and Channing in Channing, Hillers, Lötters, Rödel, Schick, Conradie, Rödder, Mercurio, Wagner, Dehling, Du Preez, Kielgast, and Burger, 2013
- Tomopterna adiastola Channing and Du Preez, 2020

==== Reptiles ====
- Pelomedusa barbata Petzold, Vargas-Ramírez, Kehlmaier, Vamberger, Branch, Du Preez, Hofmeyr, Meyer, Schleicher, Široký, and Fritz, 2014
- Pelomedusa kobe Petzold, Vargas-Ramírez, Kehlmaier, Vamberger, Branch, Du Preez, Hofmeyr, Meyer, Schleicher, Široký & Fritz, 2014
- Pelomedusa neumanni Petzold, Vargas-Ramírez, Kehlmaier, Vamberger, Branch, Du Preez, Hofmeyr, Meyer, Schleicher, Široký & Fritz, 2014
- Pelomedusa schweinfurthi Petzold, Vargas-Ramírez, Kehlmaier, Vamberger, Branch, Du Preez, Hofmeyr, Meyer, Schleicher, Široký & Fritz, 2014
- Pelomedusa somalica Petzold, Vargas-Ramírez, Kehlmaier, Vamberger, Branch, Du Preez, Hofmeyr, Meyer, Schleicher, Široký & Fritz, 2014
- Pelomedusa variabilis Petzold, Vargas-Ramírez, Kehlmaier, Vamberger, Branch, Du Preez, Hofmeyr, Meyer, Schleicher, Široký & Fritz, 2014

==== Nematodes ====
- Amphibiophilus bialatus Svitin, Kuzmin, Harnoster & Du Preez, 2020
- Amphibiophilus mooiensis Svitin & Du Preez, 2018
- Camallanus sodwanaensis Svitin, Truter, Kudlai, Smit & Du Preez, 2019
- Cosmocerca daly Harnoster, du Preez & Svitin, 2022
- Cosmocerca monicae Harnoster, du Preez & Svitin, 2022
- Cosmocerca makhadoensis Harnoster, du Preez & Svitin, 2022
- Pseudocapillaria (Ichthyocapillaria) bumpi Svitin, Bullard, Dutton, Netherlands, Syrota, Verneau & du Preez, 2021
- Serpinema cayennense Harmoster, Svitin & Du Preez, 2019
- Rhabdias delangei Kuzmin, Svitin, Harnoster & du Preez, 2020
- Rhabdias blommersiae Kuzmin, Junker, du Preez & Bain, 2013

==== Flatworms ====
- Aussietrema queenslandense (Pichelin, 1995) Du Preez & Verneau, 2020
- Aussietrema spratti (Pichelin, 1995) Du Preez & Verneau, 2020
- Emoleptalea mozambiquensis Curran, Dutton, Warren, du Preez & Bullard, 2021
- Eupolystoma namibiense Du Preez, 2015
- Fornixtrema elizabethae (Platt, 2000) Du Preez & Verneau, 2020
- Fornixtrema guianense (Du Preez, Badets, Héritier & Verneau, 2017) Du Preez & Verneau, 1920
- Fornixtrema liewi (Du Preez & Lim, 2000) Du Preez & Verneau, 2020
- Fornixtrema grossi (Du Preez & Morrison, 2012) Du Preez & Verneau, 2020
- Fornixtrema palpebrae (Strelkov, 1950) Du Preez & Verneau, 2020
- Fornixtrema scorpioides (Du Preez, Badets, Héritier & Verneau, 2017) Du Preez & Verneau, 2020
- Indopolystoma hakgalense (Crusz & Ching, 1975) Chaabane, Verneau & Du Preez, 2019
- Indopolystoma indicum (Diengdoh & Tandon, 1991) Chaabane, Verneau & Du Preez, 2019
- Indopolystoma parvum Chaabane, Verneau & Du Preez, 2019
- Indopolystoma viridi Chaabane, Verneau & Du Preez, 2019
- Indopolystoma zuoi (Shen, Wang & Fan, 2013) Chaabane, Verneau & Du Preez, 2019
- Manotrema brasiliensis (Viera, Novelli, Sousa & SouzaLima, 2008) du Preez, Domingues & Verneau, 2022
- Manotrema fuquesi (Mañe-Garzón & Gil, 1962) du Preez, Domingues & Verneau, 2022
- Manotrema uruguayensis (Mañe-Garzón & Gil, 1961) du Preez, Domingues & Verneau, 2022
- Metapolystoma ansuanum Landman, Verneau, Raharivololoniaina & Du Preez, 2021
- Metapolystoma falcatum Landman, Verneau, Raharivololoniaina & Du Preez, 2021
- Metapolystoma multiova Landman, Verneau, Raharivololoniaina & Du Preez, 2021
- Metapolystoma ohlerianum Landman, Verneau, Vences & Du Preez, 2023
- Metapolystoma porosissimae Du Preez & Kok, 1992
- Metapolystoma theroni Landman, Verneau, Raharivololoniaina & Du Preez, 2021
- Metapolystoma vencesi Landman, Verneau, Raharivololoniaina & Du Preez, 2021
- Nanopolystoma brayi Du Preez, Wilkinson & Huyse, 2008
- Nanopolystoma lynchi Du Preez, Wilkinson & Huyse, 2008
- Nanopolystoma tinsleyi Du Preez, Badets & Verneau, 2014
- Pleurodirotrema chelodinae (MacCallum, 1918) du Preez, Domingues & Verneau, 2022
- Pleurodirotrema macleayi (Rohde, 1984) du Preez, Domingues & Verneau, 2022
- Pleurodirotrema novaeguineae (Fairfax, 1990) du Preez, Domingues & Verneau, 2022
- Polystoma goeldii Sales, Du Preez, Verneau & Domingues, 2022
- Polystoma knoffi Du Preez & Domingues, 2019
- Polystoma okomuensis Aisien, Du Preez & Imasuen, 2010
- Polystoma testimagnum Du Preez & Kok, 1993
- Polystoma travassosi Du Preez & Domingues, 2019
- Polystomoides cayensis (Du Preez, Badets, Héritier & Verneau, 2017) Chaabane, Du Preez, Johnston & Verneau, 2022
- Polystomoides aspidonectis (MacCallum, 1919) Chaabane, Du Preez, Johnston & Verneau, 2022
- Polystomoides cayensis (Du Preez, Badets, Héritier & Verneau, 2017) Chaabane, Du Preez, Johnston & Verneau, 2022
- Polystomoides cyclovitellum (Caballero, Zerecero & Grocott, 1957) Chaabane, Du Preez, Johnston & Verneau, 2022
- Polystomoides domitilae (Caballero, 1938) Chaabane, Du Preez, Johnston & Verneau, 2022
- Polystomoides euzeti (Combes & Ktari, 1976) Chaabane, Du Preez, Johnston & Verneau, 2022
- Polystomoides orbiculare (Stunkard, 1916) Chaabane, Du Preez, Johnston & Verneau, 2022
- Polystomoides rugosa (MacCallum, 1918) Chaabane, Du Preez, Johnston & Verneau, 2022
- Polystomoides scriptanus Héritier, Verneau, Smith, Coetzer & Du Preez, 2017
- Polystomoides soredensis Héritier, Verneau, Smith, Coetzer & Du Preez, 2017
- Polystomoides terrapenis (Harwood, 1932) Chaabane, Du Preez, Johnston & Verneau, 2022
- Uteropolystomoides multifalx (Stunkard, 1924) Chaabane, Du Preez, Johnston & Verneau, 2022

== Awards ==
1994: W.O. Neitz medal for the best dissertation in parasitology by the Parasitological Association of Southern Africa.
