= Hans Vonk (soccer) =

South African soccer player (born 1970)

Personal information
- Full name: Johannes Adrianus Vonk
- Date of birth: 30 January 1970 (age 56)
- Place of birth: Alberton, South Africa
- Height: 1.96 m (6 ft 5 in)
- Position: Goalkeeper

Youth career
- VV Woudrichem
- GVV Unitas

Senior career*
Years	Team	Apps	(Gls)
1988–1991	RKC Waalwijk	25	(0)
1991–1992	Wageningen	33	(0)
1992–1993	Den Bosch	34	(0)
1993–1996	RKC Waalwijk	80	(0)
1996–2004	Heerenveen	263	(0)
2004–2006	Ajax	26	(0)
2006–2008	Ajax Cape Town	51	(0)
2008–2009	Ajax	0	(0)
2009	Heerenveen	4	(0)
2009–2011	Ajax Cape Town	59	(0)
Total		575	(0)

International career
1989	Netherlands U20	1	(0)
1997–2005	South Africa	43	(0)
- * Club domestic league appearances and goals

Johannes Adrianus "Hans" Vonk (Afrikaans pronunciation: [ˈɦans ˈfɔŋk]; born 30 January 1970) is a South African retired professional soccer player who last played for Ajax Cape Town FC.

== Career ==
=== Netherlands ===
Vonk began his professional career at RKC Waalwijk where he made 25 appearances in three seasons. He became first-choice goal keeper for FC Wageningen, but was forced to leave after just one season, when the club went bankrupt and ceased to exist. Vonk returned to North Brabant where he played for FC Den Bosch, before joining his first club RKC, this time as their first keeper. His breakthrough came with his transfer to sc Heerenveen, a club on the rise. They reached a domestic cup final in 1996–97 and finished second in the league in 1999–2000, resulting in UEFA Champions League football the next season. After eight years, Vonk was approaching the autumn of his career. He left Heerenveen to become third-choice goalkeeper for Ajax behind Maarten Stekelenburg and Bogdan Lobonț. In a surprising turn of events, Vonk managed to play 26 games in two seasons.

=== First stint at South Africa ===
After 18 years of professional playing Vonk left the Netherlands to return to his country of birth, and played 2 seasons for Ajax' satellite club, Ajax Cape Town. He was terminated from his contract after a conflict with the coach of Ajax Cape Town, which made him a free agent.

=== Return to Netherlands ===
Ajax signed him due to injury problems with their current goalkeepers Maarten Stekelenburg and Dennis Gentenaar, leaving the Amsterdam club with only one professional goalkeeper left: Kenneth Vermeer. In the winter transfer window of 2008–09, with the regular Ajax keepers back in shape, he once again moved to an old club, Heerenveen to become second-choice goalkeeper behind Brian Vandenbussche. He soon took over Vandenbussche's spot and played several league games, and another cup final, which Heerenveen won.

=== Second spell at Ajax Cape Town ===
Continuing his tour amongst clubs he'd already played for, Vonk once again moved, this time back to his homeland South Africa, to play for Ajax Cape Town, citing family reasons, as well as sensing an opportunity to make the Bafana Bafana World Cup 2010 squad.

== International ==
Vonk played once for the Netherlands national under-20 football team in a 3–1 win against Denmark. He played the second half coming on as a substitute for John Karelse.

Vonk made his debut for the South African national team in May 1998 and was first choice goalkeeper for the 1998 FIFA World Cup as well as an unused substitute for Andre Arendse at the 2002 FIFA World Cup. Vonk announced his retirement for Bafana Bafana in 2005 after South Africa failed to qualify for the 2006 FIFA World Cup in Germany, after earning a total of 43 caps.

== Honours ==
=== Club ===
Ajax

- KNVB Cup: 2005–06

Ajax Cape Town

- Telkom Knockout: 2008
- Nedbank Cup: 2007
- Mangaung Cup: 2007, 2008

Heerenveen

- KNVB Cup: 2008–09

=== International ===
South Africa

- Africa Cup of Nations third place: 2000
