= Sam Pam =

Nigerian footballer

Personal information
- Full name: Samuel Pam, Jr.
- Date of birth: 1 August 1968 (age 58)
- Place of birth: Jos, Nigeria
- Positions: Defender; defensive midfielder

Youth career
- 1980–1985: Plateau United

Senior career*
| Years | Team | Apps | (Gls) |
| 1985–1990 | Leventis United | | |
| 1991–1995 | BCC Lions | | |
| 1996 | Shooting Stars | | |
| 1997–1999 | Orlando Pirates | | |
| 1999–2000 | Ajax Cape Town | | |
| 2000–2002 | Ria Stars | | |
| 2002–2004 | Pietersburg Pillars | | |

International career
| 1995 | Nigeria | 1 | (0) |
- * Club domestic league appearances and goals

Samuel Pam Junior (born 1 June 1968), known as Sam Pam or Sam Pam Junior, is a former Nigerian defender and midfielder.

== Career ==
Sam Pam started his youth career at Plateau United, later moving to Leventis United where he promptly became a starter and reached the 1985 African Cup Winners' Cup final at the age of 17.

He later moved to BCC Lions and reached the 1991 African Cup Winners' Cup final, again finishing as a runner-up. During the 1995 African Cup of Champions Clubs, Pam was spotted by the Orlando Pirates after his club was knocked out of the competition by the South African side. However, they refused to sell him and he joined Shooting Stars in 1996. At his new club, he was runner-up at the 1996 African Cup of Champions Clubs, defeating Orlando Pirates at the quarterfinals. In February 1997, he joined the Buccaneers.

During his spell at Orlando Pirates, Pam became the club captain, In June 1999, he left for Ajax Cape Town in a deal that sent goalkeeper Wayne Roberts to Orlando Pirates and was the club's first captain ever. One season later, after new coach Henk Bodewes told him that he was not on the future plans, he joined Ria Stars where he stayed until 2002, when the club was dissolved. Pam then joined Pietersburg Pillars. After two seasons close to achieving promotion to the Premier Soccer League, he decided to retire.

== International career ==
Pam played once for the senior team in a match against Argentina at the 1995 King Fahd Cup.

== Retirement ==
Pam stayed in South Africa after retiring, looking for a coach career.
