= Stekelenburg =

Stekelenburg is a surname. Notable people with the surname include:

- Lennart Stekelenburg (born 1986), Dutch swimmer
- Maarten Stekelenburg (born 1982), Dutch footballer
- Maarten Stekelenburg (born 1972), Dutch football manager
