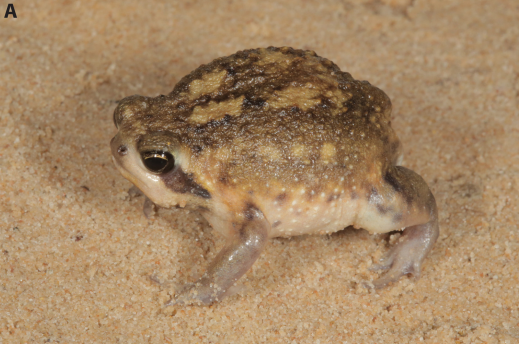

Scientific classification
- Domain: Eukaryota
- Kingdom: Animalia
- Phylum: Chordata
- Class: Amphibia
- Order: Anura
- Family: Brevicipitidae
- Genus: Breviceps
- Species: B. carruthersi

Binomial name
- Breviceps carruthersi Du Preez, Netherlands, and Minter, 2017

= Breviceps carruthersi =

Species of frog

Breviceps carruthersi or the Phinda rain frog or Carruthers' rain frog is a species of frog in the Breviceps genus endemic to South Africa. The Phinda rain frog is also known as Isinana sakwaPhinda in IsiZulu which is the local language spoken in this species' native range. An IsiZulu description of this anuran amphibian species appears in a field guide called A Bilingual Guide to the Frogs of Zululand. This frog was first described by Professor Louis H. du Preez, Doctor Edward C. Netherlands, and Professor Les Minter in 2017, and they named it in honour of the naturalist and author Vincent Caruthers.

== Description ==
The Breviceps carruthersi like most other frogs in its genus has a round body and an almost invisible snout the animals color ranged from dark brown to orange the frog has short limb which help it burrow and it has no webbing on its toes it also appears to have a black stripe under its eyelid.

== Distribution and habitat ==
The Breviceps carruthersi is confided to one location Hluhluwe, Northern KwaZulu-Natal in South Africa at elevations from 88 m to 123 m. Even there the frog is rare as it is nocturnal and inhabits forest areas making it difficult to find.
