= Mail & Guardian 200 Young South Africans =

List of influential people

The Mail & Guardian 200 Young South Africans is a list of individuals the Mail & Guardian considers to be the most influential 200 Young South Africans for the year.

It was first published in 2006 by then editor-in-chief Ferial Haffajee, and only South Africans under the age of 35 are eligible.

The first edition featured 100 notable South Africans under the age of 35.

== Notable recipients ==
- Bryan Habana (2007)
- Lauren Beukes (2009)
- Trevor Noah (2010)
- Julius Malema (2010)
- Jennifer Khwela (2011)
- Buyisiwe Sondezi (2012)
- Ntokozo Mbuli (2013)
- Vincent Breet (2015)
- Fortunate Mafeta Phaka (2016)
- Nandipha Magudumana (2018)
- Philiswa Nomngongo (2019)
