= Thamsanqa Teyise =

South African soccer player

Personal information
- Date of birth: 12 August 1986 (age 40)
- Place of birth: Alexandria, South Africa
- Position: Defender

Youth career
- Manchester United (South Africa)
- –2011: SAP Callies

Senior career*
Years	Team	Apps	(Gls)
2011–2014	AmaZulu	85	(2)
2014–2015	Supersport United	20	(0)
2015–2016	Maritzburg United	26	(2)
2016–2018	Free State Stars	32	(1)
2018–2019	Ajax Cape Town	10	(1)
- * Club domestic league appearances and goals

Thamsanqa Teyise (born 12 August 1986 in Alexandria, Eastern Cape) is a South African football (soccer) defender who last played for Ajax Cape Town.

== Club career ==
Teyise joined AmaZulu in January 2011 from Port Shepstone-based Vodacom League side, Gamalakhe United which is also known as SAP Callies in the 2010–11 season. He made his league debut just days after signing on 16 January 2011 against Lamontville Golden Arrows. He scored his first AmaZulu goals when he netted a brace in a 3–0 win over Golden Arrows at the King Zwelithini Stadium on 16 December 2014. He signed a pre-contract with SuperSport United in January 2014.

He joined Supersport United in July 2014. He made his debut on 9 August 2014 in a 1–0 win over Bidvest Wits.
