= Nathan Paulse =

South African soccer player and coach

Personal information
- Date of birth: 7 April 1982 (age 44)
- Place of birth: Cape Town, South Africa
- Height: 1.90 m (6 ft 3 in)
- Position: Striker

Youth career
- Avendale Athletico
- Ajax Cape Town

Senior career*
Years	Team	Apps	(Gls)
2000–2001	Ajax Cape Town	4	(1)
2001–2002	Avendale Athletico	12	(3)
2002–2008	Ajax Cape Town	139	(27)
2008–2011	Hammarby IF	32	(2)
2010	→ Ajax Cape Town (loan)	9	(0)
2010–2011	→ Bloemfontein Celtic (loan)	25	(4)
2011–2012	Platinum Stars	13	(0)
2012–2013	SuperSport United	9	(1)
2013–2017	Ajax Cape Town	78	(20)

International career^{‡}
2006	South Africa	1	(0)
- * Club domestic league appearances and goals as of 22 August 2013 ‡ National team caps and goals as of 29 November 2009

Nathan Paulse (born 7 April 1982 in Cape Town, Western Cape) is a South African Football Coach and retired professional footballer who played as a striker for Ajax Cape Town and was capped at international level for South Africa. As a professional footballer he played at the elite professional level in South Africa and Sweden from the age of 17 until 37. He recently was the Assistant Coach of Cape Town Spurs 1st Team who plays in the South African National First Division. He is also the owner of Starting XI Revolution Career Development Service, a company specialising in elite athlete mindset development for both amateur and professional footballers in Southern Africa. Paulse was also an Supersport 4 television pundit, sharing his analysis of local PSL matches as well frequent contributions to print media.

== Career ==
He left Ajax Cape Town in the summer of 2008, signing a three-and-one-half-year contract with Swedish club Hammarby IF.

He played his first game for Hammarby the same day that he signed for them, when Hammarby faced Malmö FF and won 4–2. He scored his first goal for the club in the Swedish Cup quarterfinal against Valsta Syrianska IK. Despite a successful first season, he failed to impress during the two following seasons and, when Hammarby was relegated at the end of the 2009 season, he moved on loan to his former team Ajax Cape Town FC from 1 January 2010 to 30 June 2010 with a buy-out clause. Following the 2016–17 season, Paulse retired from play.

== Honours ==
=== Club ===
Ajax Cape Town

- MTN 8: 2015
