= A Bilingual Field Guide to the Frogs of Zululand =

Field guide of South African frogs

A Bilingual Field Guide to the Frogs of Zululand (or Isiqondiso Sasefilidini Esindimimbili Ngamaxoxo AkwelaKwaZulu in IsiZulu) is a field guide meant to help readers identify frogs found in the Zululand region of South Africa's KwaZulu-Natal province and to dispel misconceptions about frogs among AmaZulu of the region. This book is written in English and by co-authors Doctors Fortunate Mafeta Phaka, Edward C. Netherlands, Donnavan J.D. Kruger, and Professor Louis H. du Preez from the North-West University. Translation of the text from English to IsiZulu were done by Manzo Khulu. The South African National Biodiversity Institute published the book as part of their Suricata range of peer-reviewed publications meant to be an inclusive platform for all Africans and the continent's biodiversity

This book uses the Tête-bêche bookbinding structure; one side of the book has the English titled front cover while the other side has the IsiZulu titled front cover and readers have to flip the book horizontally to switch between either languages. At the start of a frog bio-monitoring project in Zululand by the book's authors and their colleagues, the authors recognised the importance of speaking to local communities about their research in a language that was easily understood in the region, which is IsiZulu. After consultation with Zululand community members to understand their perceptions of frogs, the process of writing the book began on 28 November 2016 and the book was officially launched on 27 November 2017. As a result of this consultation, a review of this book determined that it has taken an a posteriori approach to environmental education and the sharing of educational ecosystem benefits. This book written as part of Fortunate Phaka's Master's degree research, became the first South African field guide for frogs to be written in one of the country's official indigenous languages (IsiZulu)

== Spin-offs ==
A Bilingual Field Guide to the Frogs of Zululand is cited as the motivation behind an initiative to document and share wildlife knowledge in South Africa's indigenous languages as a means of increasing inclusivity in the country's wildlife sector and preserving cultural heritage. The book was used as a case study about how the process of developing environmental education reading materials in indigenous languages contributes to development and intellectualisation of African languages. Another case study based on the book focused on folk taxonomy of the frogs discussed in this book and how it is possible to extend folk taxonomy so that it emulates scientific taxonomy with a comprehensive list of names for each frog species in the region
