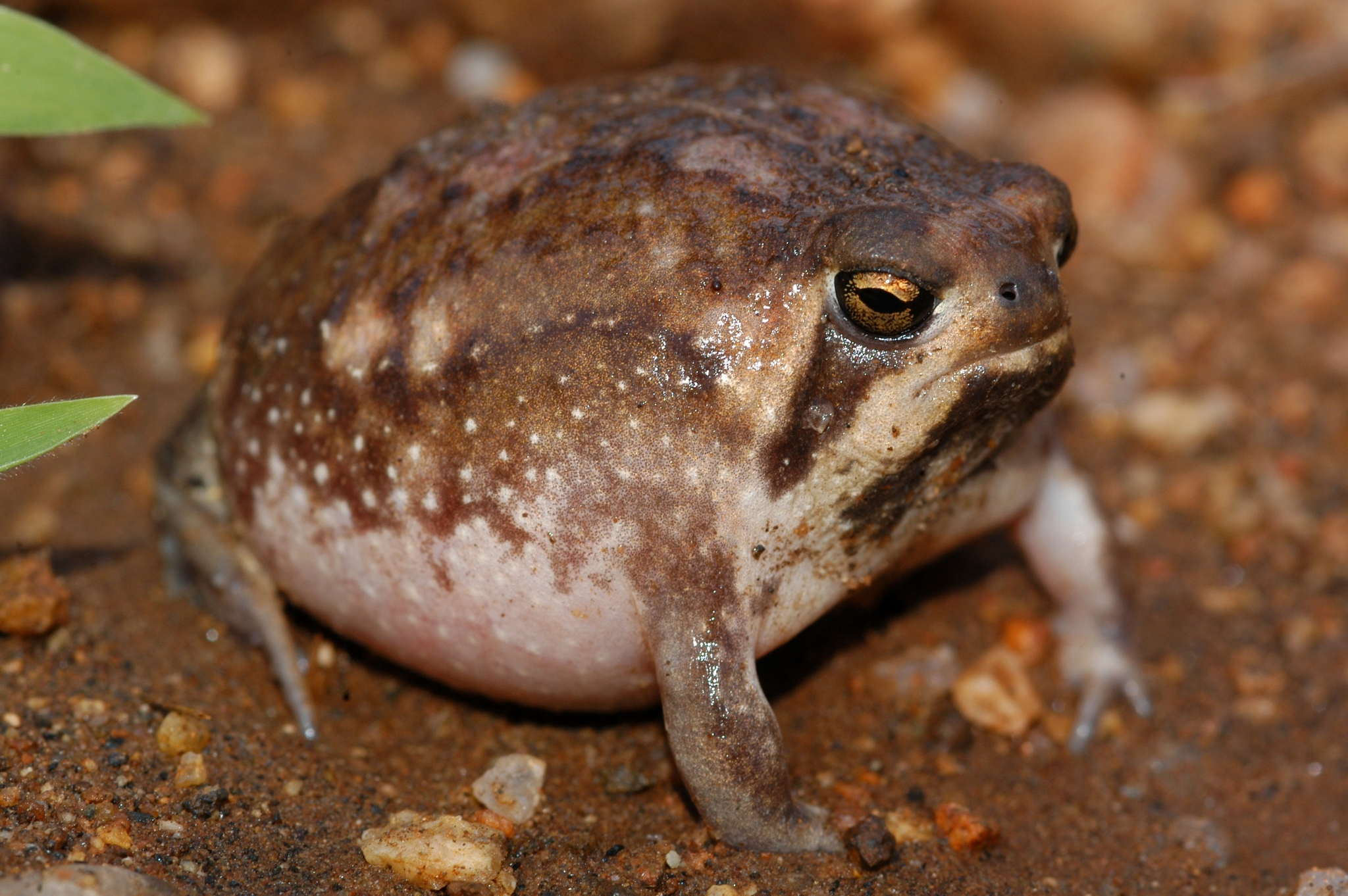

Scientific classification
- Domain: Eukaryota
- Kingdom: Animalia
- Phylum: Chordata
- Class: Amphibia
- Order: Anura
- Family: Brevicipitidae
- Genus: Breviceps
- Species: B. passmorei

Binomial name
- Breviceps passmorei Minter, Netherlands & Du Preez, 2017

= Breviceps passmorei =

Species of frog

Breviceps passmorei, or Passmore's rain frog or Ndumo rain frog is a species of frog in the genus Breviceps endemic to South Africa.

== Description ==
Breviceps passmorei has extremely abbreviated snout mouth narrow and downturned; short limbs which, at rest, are held close to the body, not projecting beyond the body outline; digits tapering to apex; inner and outer toes very short or rudimentary; inner and outer metatarsal tubercles well developed, confluent or separated by a narrow groove; vent terminal, not deflected downwards.

== Distribution ==
It is located west of the Tembe Elephant Reserve in the vicinity of the Pongola River near borders of Eswatini and Mozambique, and into southeastern Limpopo Province.

== Etymology ==
Breviceps passmorei is named after Neville Passmore in recognition of his contributions to South African herpetology in the field of bioacoustics, and for instilling a lifelong interest in frogs among his students, many of whom have also made significant contributions in this and other fields.
