= George Lebese =

South African soccer player

Personal information
- Date of birth: 3 February 1989 (age 37)
- Place of birth: Mamelodi, South Africa
- Height: 1.73 m (5 ft 8 in)
- Position: Left winger

Youth career
- Jusben
- Khona Lapho

Senior career*
Years	Team	Apps	(Gls)
2007–2008	Arcadia Shepherds		
2008–2017	Kaizer Chiefs	147	(22)
2017–2019	Sundowns	10	(2)
2019	→ SuperSport United (loan)	7	(0)
2020	Colorado Springs Switchbacks	16	(2)

International career
2011–2015	South Africa	6	(0)
- * Club domestic league appearances and goals as of 12:34, 25 March 2021 (UTC)

George Lebese (born 3 February 1989) is a South African international footballer who plays as a left winger.

== Club career ==
Born in Mamelodi, Lebese spent his early career with Jusben, Khona Lapho and Arcadia Shepherds. Lebese joined Kaizer Chiefs ahead of the 2008–09 season. He signed for Mamelodi Sundowns in August 2017. He spent time on loan at Supersport United before being released in September 2019. He moved to American side Colorado Springs Switchbacks for the 2020 season. In March 2021 it was announced that Lebese had left Colorado by mutual consent following the implementation of a COVID-19 related travel ban in the United States, which prevented him from travelling from South Africa.

== International career ==
He received his first call-up to the South African national team in November 2011, making his international debut against Ivory Coast on 11 November 2011.
