= Ntokozo Mbuli =

South African television presenter & producer

Ntokozo Mbuli is a South African television producer and presenter. and an entrepreneur. She is the creator of medical drama series Vutha, which first aired on SABC 2 in 2020, followed by a run on Amazon Prime Video in 2022 and 2023. She is most renowned for her work in conservation storytelling in television and film, and for presenting and producing the South African Broadcasting Corporation's flagship wildlife and environment show 50/50 one of the longest-running television programmes. She was the executive producer of SABC police drama, The Docket, as well as E.tv telenovelas Ashes 2 Ashes and Broken Vows, under the production company Clive Morris Productions.

The South African newspaper publication Mail & Guardian named her as one of 200 Young South Africans in 2013. In 2014 she was a nominee in the ATKV Mediaveertjies (Media Awards) for Best Presenter of a factual programme. The South African Film and Television Awards nominated her for a Golden Horn in the best TV Presenter category in 2018. She also received a National Heritage Council Golden Shield Heritage Award for heritage education in 2022.

She was elected as a member of the International Academy of Television Arts and Sciences in 2022 and has been on the jury of the International Emmy Awards in 2017, 2021, 2022 and 2023. The awards are hosted by the academy.

The National Geographic Society conferred her with the title of National Geographic Explorer in 2022. In the same year she was admitted into the transnational network of individuals who seek to uncover the root causes of anti-black racism, called the Atlantic Fellows for Racial Equity, based at the Columbia University in New York City.

She founded the South African television and film production company, Sugar Bean Pictures, which produced the SABC2 hybrid nature+culture factual series, Imvelogy and the religious docu-reality series Ichibi Lendumiso. She is a board member for the Lapalala Wilderness School. Her work in conservation has been recognised and lauded by the Wildlife and Environment Society of South Africa.
