= Mangaung Cup =

Old Mutual Mangaung Cup
- Founded: 2007
- Region: South Africa
- Teams: 4
- Current champions: Bloemfontein Celtic (3)
- Most championships: Bloemfontein Celtic (3)
- Website: Website

The Old Mutual Mangaung Cup was an annual pre-season association football tournament, sponsored by Old Mutual Emerging Markets.

Year	Winner	Score	Runner-up	Source
2007	(South Africa) Ajax Cape Town	2-0	(South Africa) Free State Stars	
2008	(South Africa) Ajax Cape Town	2-1	(South Africa) SuperSport United	
2009	(South Africa) Bloemfontein Celtic	3-2	(South Africa) Mpumalanga Black Aces	
2010	(South Africa) Bloemfontein Celtic	1-0	(South Africa) Free State Stars	
2011	(South Africa) Bloemfontein Celtic	0-0 (5-3p)	(South Africa) Black Leopards	
