= Henk Bodewes =

Dutch football manager (1944–2004)

Personal information
- Date of birth: 21 January 1954
- Place of birth: Netherlands
- Date of death: 26 July 2004 (aged 50)
- Place of death: Netherlands

Managerial career
- Years: Team
- 1981-1982: VV Actief
- 1982-1986: VV Appingedam
- 1986-1990: Veendam
- 1991-1997: VV Appingedam
- 1997-1998: Veendam
- 1999: SVBO
- 2000: Cape Town Spurs

Henk Bodewes (21 January 1944 – 26 July 2004) was a Dutch football manager who is last known to have managed Cape Town Spurs.

== Career ==
In 1999, Bodewes was appointed manager of Dutch tenth division side SVBO after working in Kenya.

In 2000, he was appointed manager of South African top flight club Cape Town Spurs, where he said, ¨"You come across things here like township boys who come to training hungry. We will give them sandwiches and milk beforehand, and vegetables and fruit afterward.¨
