= Muhsin Ertuğral =

Turkish footballer and coach (born 1959)

Personal information
- Date of birth: 15 September 1959 (age 67)
- Place of birth: Istanbul, Turkey
- Position: Midfielder

Senior career*
Years	Team	Apps	(Gls)
1987–1989	Eskişehirspor	17	

Managerial career
- 1995–1996: Zaire
- 1999–2003: Kaizer Chiefs
- 2003: Santos
- 2003–2004: Club Africain
- 2004: SV Mattersburg
- 2005: Ismaily
- 2006–2007: Ajax Cape Town
- 2007–2009: Kaizer Chiefs
- 2009: Ajax Cape Town
- 2009–2010: Sivasspor
- 2011–2012: Golden Arrows
- 2013–2014: Ajax Cape Town
- 2015–2016: Mpumalanga Black Aces
- 2016: Orlando Pirates
- 2017–2018: Ajax Cape Town
- 2019: Maritzburg United
- 2020–2023: Turkey (technical advisor)
- 2025: Cape Town City FC
- * Club domestic league appearances and goals

Muhsin Ertuğral (born 15 September 1959) is a UEFA Pro Licensed Turkish football manager.

== Playing career ==
Ertuğral played for Antalyaspor before leaving his homeland and continuing his career at clubs in Belgium and Germany where he also honed his coaching craft.

== Coaching career ==
After coaching the DR Congo national team, Ertuğral took over South African Premiership side Kaizer Chiefs in 1999, where he remained until 2003. After a number of short stints elsewhere, Ertuğral took Ajax Cape Town to ABSA Cup glory with a 2–0 victory against league champions Mamelodi Sundowns on 26 May 2007. That proved to be a successful season for Ajax under Ertuğral as they went on to finish fourth in the league and were the only side not to be defeated by Sundowns that season.

He rejoined Chiefs in 2007, leaving on 8 May 2009. He signed again for Ajax on 18 May 2009.

As of 8 October 2009, upon Bülent Uygun's resignation, he agreed to pen a deal with the Turkish Super League underdogs Sivasspor, the contract runs between 30 June 2011. Yiğidos also announced that the assistant coach position would be occupied by former Beşiktaş favorite and South Africa national team player Fani Madida.

On 24 April 2013, it was announced that Ertuğral would take over as the new Technical Director of Ajax Cape Town. This decision resulted in the direct resignation of then interim coach Jan Versleijen, who had not been notified of the new hiring. As a result, Ertuğral would see the Cape club through until the end of the 2012–13 Premiership season. David Nyathi was announced as his assistant coach, who had previously led the Ajax CT under-19 team to the 2013 Metropolitan Premier Cup Championship, where he won the “Coach of the Tournament Award”.

In January 2025, he was appointed Technical Director of South African Premiership side Cape Town City and interim head coach until the end of the season. He was dismissed in March, following a run of poor results.
