= Cape Town Spurs F.C. =

Association football club in South Africa

Cape Town Spurs
- Full name: Cape Town Spurs Football Club
- Nicknames: Urban Warriors, Spurs
- Founded: 11 January 1970; 56 years ago
- Stadium: Athlone Stadium
- Capacity: 34,000
- Chairman: Ari Efstathiou
- Manager: Roger De Sa
- League: ABC Motsepe League
- 2025–26: 3rd of 13 (Western Cape, Stream A)
- Website: capetownspurs.co.za
Home colours

Cape Town Spurs F.C. (formerly known as Ajax Cape Town) is a South African professional football club based in Parow in the city of Cape Town that plays in the ABC Motsepe League. Dutch Eredivisie club AFC Ajax was their parent club and majority shareholder after a merger of both Cape Town Spurs and Seven Stars in January 1999 until selling its shares in September 2020. After the Ajax Amsterdam partnership ended the club resurrected the name Cape Town Spurs.

The club's motto of 'Our Youth Our Future' indicates the strong emphasis on youth development at Cape Town Spurs.

== History ==
Cape Town Spurs were formed on 11 January 1970, competing in the Federation Professional League from 1971 until 1984, winning the league seven times, and the National Soccer League from 1985 to 1995, winning the championship in the final season, before the establishment of the South African Premiership in 1996. The club also won the league and the Cup in 1995, then known as the Bob Save Super Bowl.

=== Ajax Cape Town era ===
In 1999 Ajax Cape Town was formed via the amalgamation of two Cape Town-based teams, Seven Stars and Cape Town Spurs, as AFC Ajax expanded their worldwide talent-feeder network to South Africa, with the club adopting the club crest of the Amsterdam-based club. Ajax Cape Town was originally founded by John Comitis and Rob Moore in 1999. John Comitis, the honouree life chairman of Ajax Cape Town, later sold his shares in the club after 14 years at the helm and is now the chairman of Cape Town City.

Ajax, nicknamed Urban Warriors, played their first official game against Kaizer Chiefs in the Iwisa Charity Spectacular on 17 July 1999. Ajax caused an upset when they beat Chiefs 1–0 with Sam Pam, the Ajax Cape Town captain, scoring the winning goal.

Former South Africa national team coach Gordon Igesund, the country's most successful club coach, who won league titles with Manning Rangers, Orlando Pirates, Santos and Sundowns, coached the club from 2002 until 2006.

Ajax's highest league finish was runners-up in 2003–04, 2007–08 and 2010–11. Ajax won the Rothmans Cup in 2000, the Nedbank Cup in 2007, the Telkom Knockout in 2008 and the MTN8 in 2015.

In January 2007 Ajax CT managed to beat AFC Ajax 3–1 in a friendly game held in Cape Town. The next friendly, played in Amsterdam, ended in a 3–2 win for AFC Ajax in July 2009. In another notable friendlies; Ajax CT drew 1–1 with Manchester United (21 July 2012, Cape Town Stadium) and drew 2–2 (losing 4–2 on penalties) against Sporting CP (24 July 2015, Cape Town Stadium).

Over the years several Ajax CT players have made the step to the mother club, among them Steven Pienaar in 2002, Daylon Claasen in 2009, Eyong Enoh in 2008 and Thulani Serero in 2011.

In July 2013, it was announced that the Comitis brothers, longtime partners and shareholders with the Efstathiou brothers, had sold their Cape Town Stars shares, (19.6% of Ajax Cape Town), to the Efstathiou family. Ari Efstathiou was announced as the new chairman, and Muhsin Ertuğral was reinstated as manager of the club, following an interim managerial period after originally being hired as the club's new technical director.

In September 2015, Ajax won the 2015 MTN8 tournament edging Kaizer Chiefs 1–0 in the final.

Ajax CT were relegated to the National First Division after finishing bottom in the 2017–18 season due to having points deducted.

Ajax CT were deducted points for fielding Thendai Ndoro, who, according to the governing Premier Soccer League, was an illegible player. Ajax CT had previously been given the green light by the league and had officially registered the player with them as they were in possession of his player card. The team, therefore would have not been relegated had the points not been deducted and had the league not overturned their original decision that Ndoro was eligible to play.

Ajax CT finished in 4th place, outside of the playoff positions, in the 2018–19 National First Division, and again failed to achieve promotion the following season after losing in the playoffs to Black Leopards. Shortly thereafter, Ajax Amsterdam sold their 51% share in Ajax Cape Town.

In 2020, Ajax CT ended their association with Dutch club AFC Ajax, with Cape Town Stars acquiring full control of the club, and they subsequently renamed it Cape Town Spurs.

=== 2020 to 2025 ===
Cape Town Spurs finished 2nd in the 2022–23 National First Division, earning promotion through the playoffs. However, the club followed this up with back-to-back relegations. Following their relegation from the 2024–25 National First Division into the amateur SAFA Second Division, the club attempted to purchase the NFD status of Pretoria Callies for R6 million.

After relegation from the professional divisions of South African football, Spurs were embroiled in consequential court cases with former players Asanele Velebayi, Liam Bern and Luke Baartman who were deemed free agents as a result. These decisions have been heavily criticized by the club owners. The financial strain of consecutive relegations and the loss of valuable players for free put the future of the club in jeopardy and have resulted in a restructuring of the club.

=== Amateur era (2025 - present) ===
The Urban Warriors currently play in the third division of South African football, the ABC Motsepe League Western Cape Stream A, alongside former PSL outfit Santos. Home games have moved from Athlone Stadium to the club's training ground, Ikamva. The transition to the amateur ranks had not been easy and consistency on the field was hard to find. Cape Town Spurs finished 3rd out of 13 teams in their maiden season (2025-2026), narrowly missing out the promotion-qualifying places.

Cape Town Spurs announced strategic and brand partnerships with ETA College and Kappa South Africa that the club hopes to yield success in the future. During the transformational year of 2025, the club’s direction was steered by an unwavering commitment to its core values of resilience, integrity, and community.

In November 2025, Spurs announced a long-term technical partnership with global sportswear company Kappa. The agreement sees Kappa become the official technical partner for the club, providing performance apparel for the club’s senior teams and the newly launched Urban Warrior Schools.

The Urban Warriors are set to compete in their second season as amateurs with a familiar face in the dug-out. Roger de Sa has joined Spurs years after serving as Manager of Ajax CT. de Sa replaced Nasief Morris as Head Coach and will be hoping for a stronger showing in the 2026-2027. Cape Town Spurs will enter the Nedbank Cup qualifying stage at the Round of 24 and were once again drawn in Stream A of the ABC Motsepe League Western Cape.

== Rivalries ==
Cape Town Spurs' main rivalry is with Cape Town City FC. Cape Town Spurs and Cape Town City compete in the iKapa Derby. The owner of Cape Town City, John Comitis, was previously involved at Ajax Cape Town before selling his shares to the Efstathiou brothers in 2013 after a breakdown in the relationship between parties. Comitis went on to buy the PSL status of Mpumalanga Black Aces FC in 2016 and created Cape Town City.

Other local rivals include Stellenbosch FC, hailing from the nearby town of Stellenbosch, but these teams have faced each other on very few occasions. Santos and Ajax Cape Town played in fiery derby games in the 2000s and 2010s. Vasco da Gama train across the road from Ikamva and are also considered local rivals. The derbies between Santos and Vasco da Gama were reignited by Spurs' relegation to the ABC Motsepe League as all three sides played in Western Cape Stream A for the 2025–26 season.

== Youth Academy (The Young Warriors) ==
Cape Town Spurs academy players are referred to as the 'Young Warriors'.

=== Pre-amateur era ===
Cape Town Spurs traditionally fielded six youth teams. The reserve side (under-23s) last competed in the third tier of South African football but were relegated at the end of the 2024/25 season. The reserves competed in the 2023-2024 DStv Diski Challenge. Cape Town Spurs also field an under-18, under-16, under-14 and under-12 team, all of which have been highly successful in local youth competitions for many years. The Head of Youth Development and reserve team head coach is renowned coach Duncan Crowie. Crowie is a legendary figure in Cape Town's football scene having first been a successful player for Santos and more recently for his reputation of scouting and developing young players.

The likes of Nazeer Allie, Granwald Scott and Thulani Hlatshwayo came up through the youth ranks, while others such as Steven Pienaar and Thulani Serero have moved on to some of the top clubs in Europe.

As of 2011, the then Ajax Cape Town Community Scheme had been implemented in more than 120 schools across the Western Cape as far as the Cape Winelands, reaching more than 8,000 children.

The youth set-up continues to be a source of pride at Cape Town Spurs. Academy graduates continue to make up a large proportion of the first team squad and are also regulars for other sides in the Betway Premiership and Motsepe Foundation Championship.

=== Amateur era ===
In the aftermath of relegation from the professional ranks and the arbitration award handed down by Advocate Hilton Epstein SC on 8 October 2025, concerning the status of players Luke Junio Baartman and Asenele Velebayi, Cape Town Spurs have begun operating as an elite High Performance Development Centre (HPDC). Players can now join the Urban Warrior Schools, where hours are significantly increased, and the focus shifts entirely to technical mastery.

For the first time in Cape Town Spurs history, the academy is open to girls, as of 2026.

Currently, the most senior Cape Town Spurs Academy team (under-19s) play in the fourth tier. They compete in the SAFA Cape Town Hollywoodbets Regional League alongside the academy team of fierce rivals Cape Town City.

== Stadium ==
Cape Town Spurs most recently played most of their games at the Athlone Stadium but have since moved to Ikamva after falling into the amateur ranks of South African football.

From 1999, Ajax CT played their home games at Athlone Stadium and Newlands Stadium. The latter is a 51,900 capacity venue, which was first built in 1888, and was also host to the 1995 Rugby World Cup opening match. Essentially being a rugby stadium, it was a home they shared with clubs Santos and Vasco da Gama, as well as rugby teams Stormers and Western Province. Athlone Stadium was home to the Santos and has a capacity of 30,000. The stadium located in Athlone, Cape Town was also host to some of Ajax CT early home matches as well.

Spurs later moved to the Green Point Stadium, an 18,000 seat multi-purpose stadium in the Green Point area of Cape Town. The stadium was eventually demolished in 2007 to make way for the new Cape Town Stadium for the 2010 FIFA World Cup. Construction of the new stadium was completed in 2009, and the Urban Warriors played their home games at the Cape Town Stadium from the beginning of the 2010–11 season to an improved capacity of 55,000. On 3 August 2011 a contract extension of three years was negotiated with the stadium, which saw Ajax CT play their home games there until 2014.

The first match played at the new stadium was a Cape Town derby between Ajax CT and Santos on 23 January 2010 as part of the official inauguration of the stadium.

== Training facilities ==
The home of Cape Town Spurs Football Club, Ikamva, is based in Parow. Its name means 'The Future' in isiXhosa. Officially opened in 2000, Ikamva is a state of the art training facility 20km outside Cape Town in South Africa’s Western Cape province.

Ikamva boasts five football pitches (1 of which is artificial), a gym, Fan Shop, office area, studio, canteen, bar and changing rooms for the club’s Youth teams and senior squad. Ikamva has hosted a number of foreign clubs including German Bundesliga club VfB Stuttgart during their midseason camp in 2014 as well as Viking FK from Norway.

== Honours ==
=== League ===
- National Soccer League
  - Winners: 1995
- Federation Professional League
  - Winners: 1970, 1971, 1973, 1974, 1976, 1979, 1981

=== Cup competitions ===
- MTN 8 (Top 8 Tournament)
  - Winners: 2015^{1}
- Telkom Knockout (League Cup)
  - Winners: 2000^{1}, 2008^{1}
- Nedbank Cup
  - Winners: 1995, 2007^{1}

=== Pre-season ===
- Mangaung Cup
  - Winners: 2007^{1}, 2008^{1}

1. Trophies won as Ajax Cape Town F.C. from 11 January 1999 to 28 September 2020.

== Performance in CAF competitions ==
=== Continental appearances ===
- CAF Champions League: 2 appearances

2005 – Group stage (Top 8)
2009 – First Round

- CAF Confederation Cup: 1 appearance

2008 – First Round of 16

=== Continental results ===
Season	Competition	Round	Country	Club	Score	CCP (1)
2005	Champions League	Preliminary Round	Swaziland	Mhlambanyatsi Rovers	1–0, 1–1	2.0
2005	Champions League	First Round	Burkina Faso	ASFA Yennenga	1–0, 0–1	2.0
2005	Champions League	Second Round	Guinea	Fello Star	2–0, 0–2	2.0
2005	Champions League	Final Group Round	Nigeria	Enyimba	1–1, 2–0	2.0
2005	Champions League	Final Group Round	Morocco	Raja Casablanca	1–1, 0–3	2.0
2005	Champions League	Final Group Round	Egypt	Al Ahly	2–0, 0–0	2.0
2008	Confederation Cup	First Round	Seychelles	Anse Réunion	1–0, 4–1	1.0
2008	Confederation Cup	First Round of 16	Cameroon	Mount Cameroon	5–1, 0–5	1.0
2009	Champions League	First Round	Zimbabwe	Monomotapa United	3–2, 1–2	0.3

(1) CCP = CAF Co-efficiency points. Total number of points for CAF Coefficient: 17.0

== Club records ==
- Most starts: (South Africa) Brett Evans 311
- Most goals: (South Africa) Nathan Paulse 56
- Most capped player: (Zimbabwe) Edelbert Dinha
- Most starts in a season: (Zimbabwe) Edelbert Dinha 41 (2000–01)
- Most goals in a season: (South Africa) Mabhuti Khenyeza 23 (2008–09)
- Record Victory: 9–1 vs Mainstay United (22 February 2015, Nedbank Cup Second Round)
- Record defeat: 0–6 v Orlando Pirates (22 September 2004, PSL); vs Golden Arrows (24 October 2009, MTN 8)

=== League record ===
==== National Soccer League ====
- 1985 – 18th (relegated)
- 1988 – 11th
- 1989 – 18th (relegated)
- 1992 – 10th
- 1993 – 10th
- 1994 – 2nd
- 1995 – 1st (champions)

==== Premiership ====
- 1996–97 – 8th
- 1997–98 – 4th
- 1998–99 – 13th
- 1999–00 – 4th (as Ajax Cape Town)
- 2000–01 – 11th
- 2001–02 – 14th
- 2002–03 – 13th
- 2003–04 – 2nd
- 2004–05 – 6th
- 2005–06 – 11th
- 2006–07 – 4th
- 2007–08 – 2nd
- 2008–09 – 7th
- 2009–10 – 7th
- 2010–11 – 2nd
- 2011–12 – 9th
- 2012–13 – 14th
- 2013–14 – 12th
- 2014–15 – 5th
- 2015–16 – 10th
- 2016–17 – 10th
- 2017–18 – 16th

==== National First Division ====
- 2018–19 – 4th (as Ajax Cape Town)
- 2019–20 – 2nd
- 2020–21 – 14th (as Cape Town Spurs)
- 2021–22 – 14th
- 2022–23 – 2nd (promoted via the Promotion Playoffs)

==== Premiership ====
- 2023–24 – 16th (relegated)

==== National First Division ====
- 2024–25 – 15th (relegated)

==== SAFA Second Division (Western Cape Stream A) ====
- 2025–26 – 3rd

== Players ==
=== Retired numbers ===
- 21 – (South Africa) Cecil Lolo (Defender, 2009–15). Number retired on 30 October 2015 at Lolo's memorial service.

== Managers ==
- (Netherlands) Leo van Veen (1999–00)
- (Netherlands) Henk Bodewes (2000)
- (South Africa) Steve Haupt (interim) (2000–01)
- (England) Rob McDonald (2001–02)
- (South Africa) Gordon Igesund (2002–06)
- (Turkey) Muhsin Ertuğral (2006–07)
- (South Africa) Craig Rosslee (2007–09)
- (Turkey) Muhsin Ertuğral and (Netherlands) Jan Pruijn (interim) (2009)
- (Netherlands) Foppe De Haan (2009–11)
- (Netherlands) Maarten Stekelenburg (2011–12)
- (Zimbabwe) Wilfred Mugeyi and (Netherlands) Jan Pruijn (interim) (2012)
- (Netherlands) Jan Versleijen and (Turkey) Muhsin Ertuğral (int.) (2013)
- (Turkey) Muhsin Ertuğral (2013–14)
- (South Africa) Ian Taylor (interim) (2014)
- (South Africa) Roger De Sá (2014–2016)
- (Netherlands) Stanley Menzo (2016–2017)
- (Turkey) Muhsin Ertuğral (2017–2018)
- (Netherlands) Andries Ulderink (2018–20)
- (Serbia) Vladislav Herić (2020–2021)
- (South Africa) Shaun Bartlett (2021–2023)
- (Germany) Ernst Middendorp (2023–2025)
- (South Africa) Nasief Morris (2025–2026)
- (South Africa) Roger De Sá (2026–present)
