= Kate Serokolo =

South African anti-apartheid activist

- Born: Mamelodi, South Africa
- Citizenship: South African
- Occupations: Sales assistant; activist
- Known for: Anti-apartheid activism; imprisonment under the Terrorism Act
- Spouse: Fritz Serokolo
- Children: Kabelo Serokolo
- Relatives: Elizabeth Komikie Gumede (aunt)

Kate Serokolo is a South African anti-apartheid activist known for her imprisonment under apartheid-era security laws and for her testimony about the treatment of political prisoners during apartheid.

== Early life ==
Serokolo was born in Mamelodi, South Africa. She worked as a sales assistant and lived with her family in the township during the Era of strongest apartheid rule. During this period she became associated with individuals involved in the anti-apartheid struggle.

== Arrest and imprisonment ==
In 1978–1979, Serokolo, her mother and her aunt Elizabeth Komikie Gumede, was accused of accommodating anti-apartheid activists in their home in Mamelodi. At the time of her trial she was about 28 years old and pregnant with her second child. She was convicted under the Terrorism Act and sentenced to five years in prison.

she gave birth to her son, Kabelo in prison, at Kalafong Hospital in Atteridgeville while under military guard.

== Activism in prison ==
While in prison, Serokolo protested against prison conditions faced by political prisoners. She reportedly participated in protests and hunger strikes organised by women inmates in apartheid prisons.

In 1982 she and other imprisoned activists, including Caesarina Kona Makhoere and Thandi Modise, submitted a request to the Minister of Justice Kobie Coetsee asking for improved prison conditions. The request was rejected by authorities.

== Truth and Reconciliation Commission testimony ==
After the end of apartheid, Serokolo testified before the Truth and Reconciliation Commission in 1996. During her testimony she described the treatment she experienced as a political prisoner, including the circumstances surrounding the birth of her child while under guard.
