= Maarten Stekelenburg (footballer, born 1972) =

Dutch footballer and manager

Personal information
- Full name: Maarten Jan-Willem Stekelenburg
- Date of birth: 13 December 1972 (age 53)
- Place of birth: Amsterdam, Netherlands

Team information
- Current team: Netherlands (assistant)

Senior career*
Years	Team	Apps	(Gls)
- SV Argon
- SV Huizen
- AFC

Managerial career
- 2011–2012: Ajax Cape Town
- 2013: AFC
- 2013–2015: Netherlands U17
- 2015: Almere City
- 2016–2019: Netherlands U-19
- 2019–: Netherlands (assistant)
- * Club domestic league appearances and goals

Maarten Jan-Willem Stekelenburg (born 13 December 1972 in Amsterdam) is a Dutch football manager, currently working as an assistant manager for Netherlands.

He previously managed Premier Soccer League club Ajax Cape Town and Almere City. He was also the head coach of the Netherlands under-17 national team from July 2013 until June 2015, when he replaced Fred Grim at Almere City.

== Coaching career ==
Stekelenburg left his position as youth coordinator at the amateur club AFC in 1999 to move to Ajax where he trained and coached various youth teams, including the U17s, for a full decade. In the late 1990s, he was offered an internship with the Ajax D2 junior team by the then head of youth teams Hans Westerhof and after six months, Stekelenburg got his first contract as youth coach.

The former gymnastics and sports economics student then took the second Ajax team under his wing and moved up to the position of coordinator of the senior teams. In 2005, he became interim head of youth development at the Amsterdam club after Danny Blind was appointed head coach. From 2007, Stekelenburg stewarded the B2 junior team before moving to South Africa to become head of youth development at Ajax Cape Town, the satellite club of Ajax.

In June 2011, he succeeded Foppe de Haan as Ajax Cape Town head coach. Stekelenburg left the club in October 2012. During the final stages of the 2012–13 season, Stekelenburg was at the helm at AFC in the Dutch Topklasse, the third tier of football in the country. This season, he obtained practical coaching experience with Frank de Boer at Ajax as part of the KNVB's Professional Football Coaching course.

Maarten Stekelenburg currently holds several positions at the Royal Netherlands Football Association (KNVB). Apart from managing the national Under-17s (as the successor to Albert Stuivenberg who moved to the Netherlands Under-21 team), Stekelenburg is also KNVB youth football coach and teacher at the KNVB Academy. In addition, he assists the other representative teams, coordinates scouting activities at professional clubs and creates tools for talent development and recognition.

After three and a half years as manager for Netherlands U-19, it was confirmed in December 2019, that Stekelenburg had been added to Ronald Koeman's backroom staff as an assistant manager together with Ruud Van Nistelrooy ahead of the Euro 2020, after Kees van Wonderen recently had left the position.
