= 2026 UNAF U-20 Tournament =

Football tournament in Egypt

Tournament details
- Country: Egypt
- Dates: 24 September – 6 October
- Teams: 5

Final positions
- Champions: Egypt (4th title)
- Runners-up: Morocco
- Third place: Algeria

Tournament statistics
- Matches played: 10
- Goals scored: 26 (2.6 per match)

Awards
- Best player: Mahmoud Salah

The 2026 UNAF U-20 Tournament officially named TotalEnergies U-20 Africa Cup of Nations - UNAF Qualifiers 2026 was the 18th edition of the UNAF U-20 Tournament. The tournament took place in Egypt, from 24 September to 6 October 2026. The tournament also served as the qualifiers for the 2027 U-20 Africa Cup of Nations.

== Participants ==
The five participating teams were:

- Algeria
- Egypt (hosts)
- Libya
- Morocco
- Tunisia

== Venues ==
Cities	Venues	Capacity
Ismailia	Suez Canal Stadium	27,000
Ismailia	Ismailia Stadium	30,000

== Tournament ==
Pos	Team	Pld	W	D	L	GF	GA	GD	Pts	Qualification
1	Egypt (H)	4	3	0	1	6	3	+3	9	2027 U-20 Africa Cup of Nations
2	Morocco	4	2	1	1	7	4	+3	7	2027 U-20 Africa Cup of Nations
3	Algeria	4	1	1	2	5	7	−2	4 (Note: Head-to-head result: Libya 1–3 Algeria.)	
4	Libya	4	1	1	2	5	8	−3	4	
5	Tunisia	4	0	3	1	3	4	−1	3	

Source: UNAF
Rules for classification: 1) Points; 2) Goal difference; 3) Goals scored
(H) Hosts

=== Matches ===
24 September 2026
16:30

Algeria	1–1	Tunisia
Seddik 9'	Report	Marchal 30' (o.g.)

Suez Canal Stadium, Ismailia
24 September 2026
20:00

Egypt	2–0	Libya
Awad 19'; Hamdy 56'	Report

Suez Canal Stadium, Ismailia

27 September 2026
16:30

Libya	1–3	Algeria
Al Hamadi 90+4'	Report	Seddik 57'; Sellami 73'; Aïche 88'

Suez Canal Stadium, Ismailia
27 September 2026
20:00

Tunisia	0–0	Morocco
	Report

Suez Canal Stadium, Ismailia

30 September 2026
16:30

Morocco	3–1	Algeria
Bouhoudane 53'; Mounssef 56'; Hidaoui 65'	Report	Mohamed 84'

Suez Canal Stadium, Ismailia
30 September 2026
20:00

Egypt	2–1	Tunisia
El Shamy 16' (pen.); Hamad 32'	Report	Saidi 66'

Suez Canal Stadium, Ismailia

3 October 2026
16:30

Tunisia	1–1	Libya
Brik 24'	Report	Ibrahim 64'

Suez Canal Stadium, Ismailia
3 October 2026
20:00

Egypt	0–2	Morocco
	Report	Baallal 25'; Bouhoudane 33'

Suez Canal Stadium, Ismailia

6 October 2026
16:00

Libya	3–2	Morocco
Abraheem 30'; Makkari 36' (pen.); Aboulteifa 67'	Report	Kasbi 18'; Mounssef 79'

Suez Canal Stadium, Ismailia
6 October 2026
16:30

Algeria	0–2	Egypt
	Report	Salah 22'; Roshdy 82'

Ismailia Stadium, Ismailia

== Qualified teams for U-20 Africa Cup of Nations ==
The following two teams from UNAF qualified for the 2027 U-20 Africa Cup of Nations.

Team	Qualified on	Previous appearances in U-20 Africa Cup of Nations^{1}
Morocco	3 October 2026	12 (1979, 1981, 1983, 1985, 1987, 1989, 1993, **1997**, 2003, 2005, 2021, 2025)
Egypt	6 October 2026	19 (1979, **1981**, 1983, 1985, 1987, 1989, **1991**, 1993, 1997, 2001, **2003**, 2005, 2007, 2009, 2011, **2013**, 2017, 2023, 2025)

Bold indicates champion for that year. Italic indicates host for that year.
