= 2020 UNAF U-20 Tournament =

Tournament details
- Country: Tunisia
- Dates: 15–27 December 2020
- Teams: 4

Final positions
- Champions: Tunisia (6th title); Morocco (2nd title)
- Third place: Libya

Tournament statistics
- Matches played: 6
- Goals scored: 7 (1.17 per match)
- Top goal scorer(s): (Algeria) Mohamed Belloumi (Libya) Mohamed Khalil (Morocco) El Mehdi Maouhoub (Morocco) Oussama Targhalline (Tunisia) Adam Ben Lamin (Tunisia) Chiheb Labidi (1 goal each)

The 2020 UNAF U-20 Tournament was the 13th edition of the UNAF U-20 Tournament. The tournament took place in Tunisia, from 13 to 28 December 2020. This tournament serves as a qualification event for the Africa U-20 Cup of Nations. The champions and the runners-up will qualify for the 2021 Africa U-20 Cup of Nations.

== Participants ==
Egypt withdrew from the tournament due to seventeen players from the team testing positive for SARS-2 coronavirus.

- Algeria
- Egypt (withdrew)
- Libya
- Morocco
- Tunisia (hosts)

== Venues ==
Cities	Venues	Capacity
Radès	Stade Olympique de Radès	60,000
Tunis	Stade Chedly Zouiten	18,000

== Match officials ==
A total of 9 referees and 10 assistant referees were appointed for the tournament.

Referees

- Lotfi Bekouassa (Algeria)
- Lamia Atman (Algeria)
- Ahmed El-Ghandour (Egypt)
- Yara Atef (Egypt)
- Mutaz Ibrahim Al-Shalmani (Libya)
- Jalal Jayed (Morocco)
- Bouchra Karboubi (Morocco)
- Mehrez Melki (Tunisia)
- Dorsaf Ganouati (Tunisia)

Assistant Referees

- Abbes Akram Zerhouni (Algeria)
- Redouane Bounoua (Algeria)
- Ahmed Tawfiq Taleb (Egypt)
- Yousef El-Bosati (Egypt)
- Bassim Saef El-Naser (Libya)
- Majdi Kamel (Libya)
- Hicham Aït Abbou (Morocco)
- Hamza Naciri (Morocco)
- Fatiha Jermouni (Morocco)
- Mohamed Bakir (Tunisia)
- Faouzi Jridi (Tunisia)

== Tournament ==
Pos	Team	Pld	W	D	L	GF	GA	GD	Pts	Qualification
1	Tunisia (H)	3	1	2	0	2	1	+1	5	2021 Africa U-20 Cup of Nations
2	Morocco	3	1	2	0	2	1	+1	5	2021 Africa U-20 Cup of Nations
3	Libya	3	1	1	1	2	2	0	4	
4	Algeria	3	0	1	2	1	3	−2	1	
5	Egypt	0	0	0	0	0	0	0	0	Withdrew

Updated to match(es) played on 27 December 2020. Source: UNAF
Rules for classification: 1) Points; 2) Goal difference; 3) Goals scored
(H) Hosts

=== Matches ===
All times are local, CET (UTC+1).

15 December 2020
14:00

Tunisia	1–1	Algeria
Ben Lamin 33'	Report	Belloumi 12'

Stade Olympique de Radès, Radès
Referee: Ahmed El-Ghandour (Egypt)
15 December 2020
14:00

Libya	Cancelled	Egypt
	Report

Stade Chedly Zouiten, Tunis
Referee: Lotfi Bekouassa (Algeria)

18 December 2020
14:00

Egypt	Cancelled	Tunisia

Stade Olympique de Radès, Radès
18 December 2020
14:00

Algeria	0–1	Morocco
	Report	Maouhoub 78'

Stade Chedly Zouiten, Tunis
Referee: Mehrez Melki (Tunisia)

21 December 2020
14:00

Morocco	0–0	Tunisia
	Report

Stade Olympique de Radès, Radès
Referee: Mutaz Ibrahim Al-Shalmani (Libya)
21 December 2020
14:00

Libya	1–0	Algeria
Bara 19' (o.g.)	Report

Stade Chedly Zouiten, Tunis
Referee: Jalal Jayed (Morocco)

24 December 2020
14:00

Algeria	Cancelled	Egypt

Stade Chedly Zouiten, Tunis
24 December 2020
14:00

Morocco	1–1	Libya
Targhalline 31' (pen.)	Report	Khalil 47'

Stade Olympique de Radès, Radès
Referee: Ahmed El-Ghandour (Egypt)

27 December 2020
14:00

Tunisia	1–0	Libya
Labidi 85'	Report

Stade Olympique de Radès, Radès
Referee: Lotfi Bekouassa (Algeria)
27 December 2020
14:00

Egypt	Cancelled	Morocco

Stade Chedly Zouiten, Tunis

== Champions ==
2020 UNAF U-20 Tournament winners

Tunisia
Sixth title

2020 UNAF U-20 Tournament winners

Morocco
Second title

== Qualified teams for Africa U-20 Cup of Nations ==
The following four teams from CAF qualify for the 2021 Africa U-20 Cup of Nations.

Team	Qualified on	Previous appearances in Africa U-20 Cup of Nations^{1}
Morocco	24 December 2020	10 (1979, 1981, 1983, 1985, 1987, 1989, 1993, **1997**, 2003, 2005)
Tunisia	27 December 2020	6 (1979, 1981, 1983, 1985, 1987, 1989)

^{1} Bold indicates champion for that year. Italic indicates host for that year.

== Statistics ==
=== Goalscorers ===
There were 7 goals scored in 6 matches, for an average of 1.17 goals per match.

1 goal

- (Algeria) Bachir Belloumi
- (Libya) Mohamed Khalil
- (Morocco) El Mehdi Maouhoub
- (Morocco) Oussama Targhalline
- (Tunisia) Adam Ben Lamin
- (Tunisia) Chiheb Labidi

1 own goal

- (Algeria) Khalil Bara (vs Libya)

== Awards ==
- Golden ball:
- Golden boot:
- Golden glove:
- Fair play trophy:
