= Algeria national under-20 football team =

National under-20 association football team representing Algeria

Algeria U-20
- Nickname(s): الأفنــاك (Fennec foxes)
- Association: Algerian Football Federation
- Confederation: CAF (Africa)
- Head coach: Razik Nedder
- FIFA code: ALG
First colours	Second colours

First international
- Algeria 1–0 Tunisia (Algiers; 31 December 1967)

Africa U-20 Cup of Nations
- Appearances: 6 (first in 1979)
- Best result: Champion: 1979

FIFA U-20 World Cup
- Appearances: 1 (first in 1979)
- Best result: Quarter-finals (1979)

The Algeria national under-20 football team (Arabic:منتخب الجزائر الوطني تحت 20 سنة) represents Algeria in association football at the under-20 age level and is controlled by the Algerian Football Federation, the governing body for football in Algeria. Razik Nedder was appointed head coach in March 2025.

== Achievements ==
- FIFA U-20 World Cup

Quarterfinals (1): 1979

- Africa U-20 Cup of Nations: 1

Champion (1): 1979
Third Place (3): 1981, 1983, 1989

- UNAF U-20 Tournament

Runners-up (4): 2007, 2009, 2011, 2012
Third Place (3): 2005, 2010, 2019

- Arab Cup U-20

Runners-up (2): 1985, 2021
Fourth place (1): 2012

== Tournament Records ==
=== FIFA U-20 World Cup record ===
FIFA U-20 World Cup
Appearances: 1
Year	Round	Position	GP	W	D	L	GS	GA
(Tunisia) 1977	did not qualify							
(Japan) 1979	Quarter-finals	7th	4	1	2	1	2	6
(Australia) 1981	did not qualify							
(Mexico) 1983	did not qualify							
(Soviet Union) 1985	did not qualify							
(Chile) 1987	did not enter							
(Saudi Arabia) 1989	did not qualify							
(Portugal) 1991	Withdrew during qualification							
(Australia) 1993	did not qualify							
(Qatar) 1995	did not qualify							
(Malaysia) 1997	did not qualify							
(Nigeria) 1999	did not qualify							
(Argentina) 2001	did not qualify							
(United Arab Emirates) 2003	did not qualify							
(Netherlands) 2005	did not qualify							
(Canada) 2007	did not qualify							
(Egypt) 2009	did not qualify							
(Colombia) 2011	did not qualify							
(Turkey) 2013	did not qualify							
(New Zealand) 2015	did not enter							
(South Korea) 2017	did not qualify							
(Poland) 2019	did not qualify							
(Indonesia) ~~2021~~	did not qualify (cancelled)							
(Argentina) 2023	did not qualify							
(Chile) 2025	did not qualify							
(Azerbaijan) (Uzbekistan) 2027	did not qualify							
(Armenia) (Georgia (country)) 2029	to be determined							
Total	Quarter-finals	1/26	4	1	2	1	2	6

=== Africa U-20 Cup of Nations record ===
Africa U-20 Cup of Nations
Appearances: 6
Year	Round	Position	GP	W	D	L	GS	GA
1979	Champions	1st	8	4	3	1	10	7
1981	Semi-finals	3rd	3	2	0	1	7	5
1983	Semi-finals	3rd	6	3	1	2	7	6
1985	Round 1	9th	2	0	2	0	0	0
1987	did not enter							
1989	Semi-finals	3rd	6	1	4	1	6	6
(Egypt) 1991	Withdrew after qualification							
(Mauritius) 1993	did not qualify							
(Nigeria) 1995	did not qualify							
(Morocco) 1997	did not qualify							
(Ghana) 1999	did not qualify							
(Ethiopia) 2001	did not qualify							
(Burkina Faso) 2003	did not qualify							
(Benin) 2005	did not qualify							
(Republic of the Congo) 2007	did not qualify							
(Democratic Republic of the Congo) 2009	did not qualify							
(South Africa) 2011	did not qualify							
(Algeria) 2013	Group stage	8th	3	0	1	2	0	3
(Senegal) 2015	did not enter							
(Zambia) 2017	did not qualify							
(Niger) 2019	did not qualify							
(Mauritania) 2021	did not qualify							
(Egypt) 2023	did not qualify							
(Egypt) 2025	did not qualify							
(Ghana) 2027	did not qualify							
Total	Champions	6/25	28	10	11	7	30	27

=== UNAF U-20 Tournament record ===
UNAF U-20 Tournament
Appearances: 13
Year	Round	Position	GP	W	D	L	GS	GA
(Tunisia) 2005	Third place	3rd	3	1	1	1	3	4
(Egypt) 2006	Fourth place	4th	4	1	1	1	1	3
(Libya) 2007	Runner-up	2nd	3	1	1	1	5	4
(Morocco) 2008	Fifth place	5th	4	0	2	2	1	4
(Libya) 2009	Runner-up	2nd	3	2	0	1	4	2
(Algeria) 2010	Third place	3rd	3	0	2	1	1	2
(Libya) 2011	Runner-up	2nd	3	2	0	1	3	1
(Algeria) Mar 2012	Fourth place	4th	2	0	0	2	1	3
(Algeria) Dec 2012	Runner-up	2nd	3	1	1	1	5	3
(Libya) 2014	did not enter							
(Tunisia) 2015	did not enter							
(Tunisia) 2019	Third place	3rd	4	2	0	2	6	5
(Tunisia) 2020	Fourth place	4th	3	0	1	2	1	3
(Tunisia) 2021	Fourth place	4th	4	1	0	3	3	9
(Egypt) 2022	Fourth place	4th	3	0	2	1	5	7
(Tunisia) 2023	Fifth place	5th	4	0	0	4	7	14
(Egypt) 2024	Fourth place	4th	4	1	2	1	7	4
(Tunisia) 2026	Third place	3rd	4	1	1	2	5	7
Total	Runner-up	15/17	50	13	14	22	51	61

=== Mediterranean Games Record ===
Mediterranean Games
Appearances: 12
Year	Round	Position	Pld	W	D	L	GF	GA
(Egypt) 1951	Part of France							
(Spain) 1955	Part of France							
(Lebanon) 1959	Part of France							
(Italy) 1963	did not enter							
(Tunisia) 1967	Group stage	6th	3	1	0	2	4	6
(Turkey) 1971	did not qualify							
(Algeria) 1975	Gold medal ^{1}	1st	6	6	0	0	14	3
(Socialist Federal Republic of Yugoslavia) 1979	Bronze medal	3rd	5	2	2	1	7	6
(Morocco) 1983	Group stage	6th	2	1	0	1	3	3
(Syria) 1987	Group stage^{1}	8th	3	0	0	3	1	7
(Greece) 1991	Group stage	8th	2	0	0	2	1	5
(France) 1993	Silver medal	2nd	4	2	1	1	6	4
(Italy) 1997	Group stage	8th	3	0	3	0	4	4
(Tunisia) 2001	Group stage	8th	2	0	0	2	3	7
(Spain) 2005	Quarter-finals	6th	3	1	1	1	3	4
(Italy) 2009	did not qualify							
(Turkey) 2013	did not qualify							
(Spain) 2018	Group stage	6th	3	1	0	2	3	5
(Algeria) 2022	Group stage	6th	3	1	0	2	3	5
(Algeria) 2026	Gold medal	1st	5	4	1	0	10	3
Total	Gold Medal	12/19	44	19	8	17	62	62

- Prior to the Athens 1991 campaign, the Football at the Mediterranean Games was open to full senior national teams.
- ^1 Algeria participated with the national B team in 1975 and 1987.

=== Arab Cup U-20 Record ===
Arab Cup U-20
Appearances: 8
Year	Round	Position	Pld	W	D	L	GF	GA
(Morocco) 1983	Fifth place	5th	7	2	3	2	8	10
(Algeria) 1985	Runners-up	2nd	7	5	0	2	12	4
(Morocco) 1989	Group stage	9th	3	0	1	1	2	3
(Morocco) 2011	Group stage	5th	4	2	1	1	7	3
(Jordan) 2012	Fourth place	4th	5	2	1	2	10	7
(Qatar) 2014	Cancelled							
(Saudi Arabia) 2020	Quarter-finals	6th	4	2	0	2	4	7
(Egypt) 2021	Runners-up	2nd	6	2	2	2	7	6
(Saudi Arabia) 2022	Semi-finals	3rd	4	3	0	1	7	5
(Iraq) 2026	To be determined							
(Egypt) 2028	To be determined							
Total	Runners-up	8/8	40	18	8	13	64	45

== Current squad ==
The following players were called up for the friendly matches against Egypt on 28 and 31 March 2026 in Cairo.

Caps and goals correct as of 3 June 2025, after the match against Tunisia.

No.	Pos.	Player	Date of birth (age)	Caps	Goals	Club
	GK	Waël Dahmani	6 February 2008 (age 18)	0	0	(French Football Federation) Nantes
	GK	Mohammed El Koubi	19 July 2007 (age 19)	0	0	(Algerian Football Federation) Paradou AC
	GK	Adel Hamouda	5 April 2008 (age 18)	0	0	(French Football Federation) Le Havre
	DF	Jalil Conteh	16 December 2008 (age 17)	0	0	(The Football Association) Bournemouth
	DF	Adam Letlat	11 August 2008 (age 18)	0	0	(The Football Association) West Bromwich Albion
	DF	Abdeldjalil Mansouri		0	0	(Algerian Football Federation) Belouizdad
	DF	Yanis Sofikitis	3 February 2007 (age 19)	0	0	(French Football Federation) Nice
	MF	Houssam Abdelaziz	31 August 2007 (age 19)	0	0	(Algerian Football Federation) Paradou
	MF	Yassine Aïche	7 June 2008 (age 18)	0	0	(French Football Federation) Nice
	MF	Oscar Aïssat	15 February 2007 (age 19)	0	0	(French Football Federation) Amiens
	MF	Ahmed Bouchoukh	8 July 2007 (age 19)	0	0	(French Football Federation) Guingamp
	MF	Saad Boussadia	18 March 2008 (age 18)	0	0	(French Football Federation) Lille
	MF	Daniel Ilyès Mahdid	8 June 2007 (age 19)	0	0	(Algerian Football Federation) MC Alger
	MF	Youcef Izem	19 February 2007 (age 19)	0	0	(Algerian Football Federation) JS Kabylie
	MF	Yanis Sellami	4 January 2007 (age 19)	0	0	(French Football Federation) Marseille
	FW	Kéfren Ali	22 March 2007 (age 19)	0	0	(French Football Federation) Nice
	FW	Zaid Betteka	7 February 2007 (age 19)	0	0	(The Football Association) Birmingham City
	FW	Younes Hansal	24 April 2007 (age 19)	0	0	(Swiss Football Association) Basel
	FW	Farouk Laoufi	27 October 2007 (age 18)	0	0	(Algerian Football Federation) Olympique Akbou
	FW	Houssem Tarzout	19 January 2007 (age 19)	0	0	(Algerian Football Federation) Paradou

== Notable players ==
- Salah Assad
- Lakhdar Belloumi
- Baghdad Bounedjah
- Rabah Madjer
- Djamel Menad
- Hocine Yahi
- Chaabane Merzekane

== Past squads ==
- 1979 FIFA World Youth Championship squad

== See also ==
- Algeria national football team
- Algeria national under-23 football team
- Algeria national under-17 football team
- Algeria national under-15 football team
