= Libya national under-20 football team =

National under-20 association football team representing Libya

Libya U-20
- Association: Libyan Football Federation
- Confederation: CAF (Africa)
- Home stadium: Tripoli Stadium
- FIFA code: LBY
First colours	Second colours

Africa U-20 Cup of Nations
- Appearances: 1 (first in 1979)
- Best result: 1st round: 1979

FIFA U-20 World Cup
- Appearances: 0

The Libya national under-20 football team (Arabic:منتخب ليبيا الوطني لكرة القدم تحت 20 سنة) represents Libya in association football at an under-20 age level and is controlled by the Libyan Football Federation, the governing body for football in Libya.

== Achievements ==
- UNAF U-20 Tournament

Champions (1): 2011
Runners-up (1): 2022
Third Place (3): 2007, 2014, 2020

- Arab Cup U-20

Third place: 2012

== Tournament Records ==
=== FIFA U-20 World Cup record ===
FIFA U-20 World Cup
Appearances: 0
Year	Round	Position	GP	W	D	L	GS	GA
(Tunisia) 1977	Did not qualify							
(Japan) 1979	Did not qualify							
(Australia) 1981	Did not enter							
(Mexico) 1983	Withdrew before qualification							
(Soviet Union) 1985	Withdrew before qualification							
(Chile) 1987	Did not enter							
(Saudi Arabia) 1989	Did not enter							
(Portugal) 1991	Did not enter							
(Australia) 1993	Did not enter							
(Qatar) 1995	Did not enter							
(Malaysia) 1997	Did not enter							
(Nigeria) 1999	Did not qualify							
(Argentina) 2001	Did not qualify							
(United Arab Emirates) 2003	Did not qualify							
(Netherlands) 2005	Did not qualify							
(Canada) 2007	Did not qualify							
(Egypt) 2009	Did not qualify							
(Colombia) 2011	Did not enter							
(Turkey) 2013	Did not qualify							
(New Zealand) 2015	Did not qualify							
(South Korea) 2017	Did not qualify							
(Poland) 2019	Did not qualify							
(Argentina) 2023	Did not qualify							
(Chile) 2025	Did not qualify							
(Azerbaijan) (Uzbekistan) 2027	To be determined							
Total	0/22							

=== Africa U-20 Cup of Nations record ===
Africa U-20 Cup of Nations
Appearances: 1
Year	Round	Position	GP	W	D	L	GS	GA
1979	Round 1	9th	2	0	1	1	2	3
1981	Did not enter							
1983	Withdrew before qualification							
1985	Withdrew before qualification							
1987	Did not enter							
1989	Did not enter							
(Egypt) 1991	Did not enter							
(Mauritius) 1993	Did not enter							
(Nigeria) 1995	Did not enter							
(Morocco) 1997	Did not enter							
(Ghana) 1999	Did not qualify							
(Ethiopia) 2001	Did not qualify							
(Burkina Faso) 2003	Did not qualify							
(Benin) 2005	Did not qualify							
(Republic of the Congo) 2007	Did not qualify							
(Democratic Republic of the Congo) 2009	Did not qualify							
(South Africa) 2011	Did not enter							
(Algeria) 2013	Did not qualify							
(Senegal) 2015	Did not qualify							
(Zambia) 2017	Did not qualify							
(Niger) 2019	Did not qualify							
(Mauritania) 2021	Did not qualify							
(Egypt) 2023	Did not qualify							
Total	1/23	Round 1	2	0	1	1	2	3

=== UNAF U-20 Tournament record ===
UNAF U-20 Tournament
Appearances: 7
Year	Round	Position	GP	W	D	L	GS	GA
(Tunisia) 2005	Fourth place	4th	3	0	1	2	2	6
(Egypt) 2006	Fifth place	5th	4	0	0	4	2	7
(Libya) 2007	Third place	3rd	3	1	1	1	2	2
(Morocco) 2008	Fourth place	4th	4	0	2	2	4	7
(Libya) 2009	Fourth place	4th	3	0	0	3	0	5
(Algeria) 2010	Did not enter							
(Libya) 2011	Champion	1st	3	2	1	0	6	1
(Algeria) Mar 2012	Did not enter							
(Algeria) Dec 2012	Did not enter							
(Libya) 2014	Third place	3rd	2	1	0	1	2	2
(Tunisia) 2015	Did not enter							
(Tunisia) 2019	Withdrew							
(Tunisia) 2020	Third place	3rd	3	1	1	1	2	2
(Tunisia) 2021	Fifth place	5th	4	0	1	3	3	9
(Tunisia) 2022	Runners-up	2nd	3	1	1	1	2	2
Total	Champion	10/15	32	6	8	18	25	43

=== Mediterranean Games Record ===
Mediterranean Games
Appearances: 9
Year	Round	Position	Pld	W	D	L	GF	GA
(Egypt) 1951	Part of Italy							
(Spain) 1955	Did not enter							
(Lebanon) 1959	Did not enter							
(Italy) 1963	Did not enter							
(Tunisia) 1967	Group Stage	8th	3	0	1	2	1	5
(Turkey) 1971	Did not enter							
(Algeria) 1975	Group Stage	7th	4	1	0	3	4	8
(Socialist Federal Republic of Yugoslavia) 1979	Did not enter							
(Morocco) 1983	Group Stage	9th	2	0	0	2	2	5
(Syria) 1987	Did not enter							
(Greece) 1991	Did not enter							
(France) 1993	Did not enter							
(Italy) 1997	Group Stage	10th	3	0	2	1	3	4
(Tunisia) 2001	Group Stage	7th	2	0	1	1	1	2
(Spain) 2005	Bronze Medal	3rd	5	1	2	2	3	10
(Italy) 2009	Bronze Medal	3rd	4	0	3	1	0	1
(Turkey) 2013	Fourth Place	4th	5	1	1	3	6	12
(Spain) 2018	Group Stage	9th	2	0	0	2	1	8
(Algeria) 2022	Did not enter							
Total	Bronze Medal	9/19	30	3	10	17	21	55

- Prior to the Athens 1991 campaign, the Football at the Mediterranean Games was open to full senior national teams.

=== Arab Cup U-20 Record ===
Arab Cup U-20
Appearances: 3
Year	Round	Position	Pld	W	D	L	GF	GA
(Morocco) 2011	Did not enter							
(Jordan) 2012	Third place	3rd	5	3	1	1	5	4
(Qatar) 2014	Cancelled							
(Saudi Arabia) 2020	Quarter-finals	5th	4	2	1	1	4	4
(Egypt) 2021	Did not enter							
(Saudi Arabia) 2022	Group stage	10th	2	1	0	1	3	3
(Iraq) 2026	To be determined							
(Egypt) 2028	To be determined							
Total	Third place	3/5	11	6	2	3	12	11
