= Mauritania national under-20 football team =

National under-20 association football team representing Mauritania

Mauritania U-20
- Association: Football Federation of the Islamic Republic of Mauritania
- Confederation: CAF (Africa)
- Home stadium: Stade Olympique
- FIFA code: MTN
First colours	Second colours

Africa U-20 Cup of Nations
- Appearances: 3 (first in 1981)
- Best result: 1st round (1981, 1987, 2021)

The Mauritania national under-20 football team (Arabic: منتخب موريتانيا الوطني لكرة القدم تحت 20 سنة) represents Mauritania in association football at an under-20 age level. It is controlled by the Football Federation of the Islamic Republic of Mauritania (FFRIM), the governing body for football in Mauritania.

== Achievements ==
- UNAF U-20 Tournament

Runners-up (1): 2012

== Tournament Records ==
=== FIFA U-20 World Cup record ===
FIFA U-20 World Cup
Appearances: 0
Year	Round	Position	GP	W	D	L	GS	GA
(Tunisia) 1977	Did not enter							
(Japan) 1979	Did not enter							
(Australia) 1981	Did not qualify							
(Mexico) 1983	Did not enter							
(Soviet Union) 1985	Did not enter							
(Chile) 1987	Did not qualify							
(Saudi Arabia) 1989	Withdrew before qualification							
(Portugal) 1991	Did not qualify							
(Australia) 1993	Did not qualify							
(Qatar) 1995	Withdrew before qualification							
(Malaysia) 1997	Did not qualify							
(Nigeria) 1999	Withdrew before qualification							
(Argentina) 2001	Did not qualify							
(United Arab Emirates) 2003	Withdrew before qualification							
(Netherlands) 2005	Did not enter							
(Canada) 2007	Did not qualify							
(Egypt) 2009	Did not qualify							
(Colombia) 2011	Did not enter							
(Turkey) 2013	Did not qualify							
(New Zealand) 2015	Did not qualify							
(South Korea) 2017	Did not qualify							
(Poland) 2019	Did not qualify							
(Argentina) 2023	Did not qualify							
(Chile) 2025	Did not qualify							
(Azerbaijan) (Uzbekistan) 2027	to be determined							
Total	–	0/25	–	–	–	–	–	–

=== Africa U-20 Cup of Nations record ===
Africa U-20 Cup of Nations
Appearances: 2
Year	Round	Position	GP	W	D	L	GS	GA
1979	Did not enter							
1981	Round 1	13th	2	0	0	2	1	6
1983	Did not enter							
1985	Did not enter							
1987	Round 1	12th	2	0	0	2	0	6
1989	Withdrew before qualification							
(Egypt) 1991	Did not qualify							
(Mauritius) 1993	Did not qualify							
(Nigeria) 1995	Withdrew before qualification							
(Morocco) 1997	Did not qualify							
(Ghana) 1999	Withdrew before qualification							
(Ethiopia) 2001	Did not enter							
(Burkina Faso) 2003	Withdrew before qualification							
(Benin) 2005	Did not enter							
(Republic of the Congo) 2007	Did not qualify							
(Democratic Republic of the Congo) 2009	Did not qualify							
(South Africa) 2011	Did not enter							
(Algeria) 2013	Did not qualify							
(Senegal) 2015	Did not qualify							
(Zambia) 2017	Did not qualify							
(Niger) 2019	Did not qualify							
(Mauritania) 2021	Group stage	9th	3	1	1	1	3	3
(Egypt) 2023	Did not qualify							
(Egypt) 2025	Withdrew before qualification							
Total	Round 1	3/24	7	1	1	5	4	15

=== WAFU U-20 Championship record ===
WAFU U-20 Championship
Appearances: 2
Year	Round	Position	GP	W	D	L	GS	GA
(Nigeria) 2008	Group stage	14th	3	0	0	3	1	10
(Liberia) 2018	Did not enter							
(Guinea) 2019	Group stage	7th	3	0	1	2	2	6
(Senegal) 2020	Did not enter							
Total	Group stage	2/4	6	0	1	5	3	16

=== Arab Cup U-20 Record ===
Arab Cup U-20
Appearances: 4
Year	Round	Position	Pld	W	D	L	GF	GA
(Morocco) 2011	Did not enter							
(Jordan) 2012	Group stage	8th	3	1	0	2	4	5
(Qatar) 2014	Cancelled							
(Saudi Arabia) 2020	Group stage	11th	3	1	0	2	2	3
(Egypt) 2021	Group stage	13th	3	0	1	2	1	5
(Saudi Arabia) 2022	Group stage	12th	2	1	0	1	1	2
(Iraq) 2026	To be determined							
(Egypt) 2028	To be determined							
Total	Group stage	4/5	11	3	1	7	8	15

== Current squad ==
The following players were called up for the 2021 UNAF U-20 Tournament.

No.	Pos.	Player	Date of birth (age)	Club
	GK			
	DF			
	MF			
	FW			
