= Egypt national under-20 football team =

Egypt U-20
- Nickname: The Young Pharaohs
- Association: Egyptian Football Association
- Confederation: CAF
- Head coach: Vacant
- Captain: Moataz Mohamed
- Home stadium: Cairo International Stadium
- FIFA code: EGY
First colours	Second colours

African Youth Championship
- Appearances: 20 (first in 1979)
- Best result: Champions (1981, 1991, 2003, 2013)

FIFA U-20 World Cup
- Appearances: 9 (first in 1981)
- Best result: Third Place (2001)

The Egypt national under-20 football team is the national youth team of Egypt. It is administered by the Egyptian Football Association.

Their best performance in the U-20 World Cup was a third-place finish in 2001. This remains the highest result Egypt has achieved in any International World Cup.

Their nickname, The Young Pharaohs is a reference to the nickname of the national team, The Pharaohs.

Egypt hosted the 2009 U-20 World Cup.

== FIFA U-20 World Cup record ==
=== FIFA World Youth Championship ===
FIFA U-20 World Cup record
Year	Round	Position	Pld	W	D	L	GF	GA	Squad
(Tunisia) 1977	Did Not Participate								
(Japan) 1979	Did Not Participate								
(Australia) 1981	Quarter-finals	8th	4	1	2	1	9	10	Squad
(Mexico) 1983	Did Not Participate								
(Soviet Union) 1985	Did Not Participate								
(Chile) 1987	Did Not Participate								
(Saudi Arabia) 1989	Did Not Participate								
(Portugal) 1991	Group Stage	9th	3	1	0	2	6	2	Squad
(Australia) 1993	Did Not Participate								
(Qatar) 1995	Did Not Participate								
(Malaysia) 1997	Did Not Participate								
(Nigeria) 1999	Did Not Participate								
(Argentina) 2001	Semi-final	3rd	7	4	1	2	8	11	Squad
(United Arab Emirates) 2003	Round of 16	15th	4	1	1	2	2	3	Squad
(Netherlands) 2005	Group Stage	22nd	3	0	0	3	0	5	Squad
(Canada) 2007	Did Not Participate								
(Egypt) 2009	Round of 16	13th	4	2	0	2	9	7	Squad
(Colombia) 2011	Round of 16	9th	4	2	1	1	7	3	Squad
(Turkey) 2013	Group Stage	17th	3	1	0	2	4	4	Squad
(New Zealand) 2015	Did Not Participate								
(South Korea) 2017	Did Not Participate								
(Poland) 2019	Did Not Participate								
(Argentina) 2023	Did Not Participate								
(Chile) 2025	Group Stage	18th	3	1	0	2	3	5	
(Azerbaijan) (Uzbekistan) 2027	To be determined								
(Armenia) (Georgia (country)) 2029	To be determined								
Total	Third Place	9/26	35	13	5	17	48	50	

- Red border color indicates tournament was held on home soil.

== Tournament Records ==
=== Africa U-20 Cup of Nations ===
Africa U-20 Cup of Nations record
Year	Round	Position	Pld	W	D	L	GF	GA	Squad
home & away 1977	Semi-finals	4th							
home & away 1979	1st-round								
home & away 1981	Final	Champion							
home & away 1983	2nd-round								
home & away 1985	1st-round								
home & away 1987	2nd-round								
home & away 1989	2nd-round								
(Egypt) 1991	Final	Champion							
(Mauritius) 1993	3rd-round								
(Nigeria) 1995	Did Not Participate								
(Morocco) 1997	Group-stage								
(Ghana) 1999	Did Not Participate								
(Ethiopia) 2001	Semi-final	3rd	5	2	2	1	6	3	
(Burkina Faso) 2003	Final	Champion	5	3	2	0	11	4	
(Benin) 2005	Final	2nd	5	3	1	1	8	7	
(Republic of the Congo) 2007	Group-stage		3	1	1	1	2	4	
(Rwanda) 2009	Group-stage		3	2	0	1	4	4	
(South Africa) 2011	Semi-final	3rd	5	3	0	2	4	1	
(Algeria) 2013	Final	Champion	5	5	0	0	7	2	
(Senegal) 2015	Did not qualify								
(Zambia) 2017	Group-stage		3	0	2	1	2	4	
(Niger) 2019	Did not qualify								
(Mauritania) 2021	Did not qualify								
(Egypt) 2023	Group-stage		3	0	2	1	0	5	
(Egypt) 2025	Semi-final	4th	6	2	3	1	9	7	

=== Arab Cup U-20 record ===
Arab Cup U-20
Appearances: 4 / 5
Year	Round	Position	Pld	W	D	L	GF	GA
(Morocco) 1983	did not enter							
(Algeria) 1985	did not enter							
(Iraq) 1989	did not enter							
(Sudan) ~~1992~~	Cancelled							
(Morocco) 2011	Group stage	4th	4	3	0	1	6	2
(Jordan) 2012	did not enter							
(Qatar) ~~2014~~	Cancelled							
(Saudi Arabia) 2020	Semi-finals	3rd	5	3	2	0	11	5
(Egypt) 2021	Semi-finals	3rd	5	4	0	1	12	4
(Saudi Arabia) 2022	Runners-up	2nd	5	4	1	0	9	3
(Iraq) 2026	To be determined							
(Egypt) 2028	To be determined							
Total	Best: Runners-up	4 / 5	19	14	3	2	38	14

=== North-African U-20 Cup record ===
UNAF U-20 Tournament
Appearances: 6 / 15
Year	Round	Position	Pld	W	D	L	GF	GA
(Tunisia) 2005	Group	2nd	3	1	1	1	3	1
(Egypt) 2006	Group	Champions	4	2	2	0		
(Libya) 2007	Didn't Participate	-	-	-	-	-	-	-
(Morocco) 2008	Group	Champions	4	2	2	0	4	1
(Libya) 2009	Didn't Participate	-	-	-	-	-	-	-
(Algeria) 2010	Didn't Participate	-	-	-	-	-	-	-
(Libya) 2011	Didn't Participate	-	-	-	-	-	-	-
(Algeria) 2012	Group	Champions	1	2	0	0	5	1
(Libya) 2014	Didn't Participate	-	-	-	-	-	-	-
(Tunisia) 2015	Didn't Participate	-	-	-	-	-	-	-
(Mauritania) ~~2016~~	Cancelled	-	-	-	-	-	-	-
(Tunisia) 2019	Group	2nd	4	2	1	1	5	4
(Tunisia) 2020	Disqualified	-	-	-	-	-	-	-
(Tunisia) 2021	Group	2nd	4	3	0	1	6	5
(Egypt) 2022	Didn't Participate	-	-	-	-	-	-	-
(Tunisia) 2023	Group	3rd	4	1	2	1	8	7
(Egypt) 2024	Group	2nd	4	2	1	1	5	4
Total	Best: Champions	8/16	28	15	9	5	36	23

== Honors ==
World Cups :

- Bronze Medalists at the 2001 FIFA World Youth Championship

== Current squad ==
The following players were called up for the 2025 U-20 Africa Cup of Nations between 27 April – 18 May 2025.

Caps and goals correct as of 27 April 2025, after the match against Saudi Arabia.

No.	Pos.	Player	Date of birth (age)	Caps	Goals	Club
1	GK	Abdelmonem Tamer	3 August 2006 (age 20)	11	0	(Egyptian Football Association) ZED
16	GK	Ahmed Wahba	5 May 2005 (age 21)	2	0	(Egyptian Football Association) Al Masry
23	GK	Ahmed Menshawi	1 January 2005 (age 21)	0	0	(Egyptian Football Association) Al Ittihad
2	DF	Mohamed Samir	3 February 2006 (age 20)	8	1	(Egyptian Football Association) ENPPI
3	DF	Mohamed Gamal Ibrahim	1 January 2005 (age 21)	0	0	(Egyptian Football Association) Petrojet
4	DF	Ahmed Abdin	1 May 2006 (age 20)	12	0	(Egyptian Football Association) Ceramica Cleopatra
5	DF	Abdallah Bostangy	4 April 2005 (age 21)	11	1	(Egyptian Football Association) Smouha
6	DF	Youssef Abdelhafiz	5 January 2005 (age 21)	6	0	(Egyptian Football Association) Ceramica Cleopatra
12	DF	Moamen Sherif	11 February 2006 (age 20)	2	0	(Egyptian Football Association) Al Ittihad
13	DF	Mahmoud Labib	1 January 2005 (age 21)	5	0	(Egyptian Football Association) Al Ahly
14	DF	Mohab Samy	20 February 2005 (age 21)	6	0	(Egyptian Football Association) ENPPI
8	MF	Kabaka	22 April 2005 (age 21)	15	4	(Egyptian Football Association) Modern Sport
21	MF	Ahmed Wahid	1 January 2005 (age 21)	1	0	(Egyptian Football Association) Al Ahly
22	MF	Mohamed El Sayed	20 May 2006 (age 20)	13	0	(Egyptian Football Association) Zamalek
24	MF	Mohamed Atef	1 January 2007 (age 19)	0	0	(Egyptian Football Association) Al Ahly
25	MF	Seif Eldin Essam	3 April 2005 (age 21)	6	0	(Egyptian Football Association) ENPPI
7	FW	Amoory	27 May 2005 (age 21)	6	2	(Egyptian Football Association) Al Ittihad
9	FW	Mohamed Zaalouk	5 March 2005 (age 21)	11	4	(Egyptian Football Association) Al Ahly
10	FW	Mohamed Abdallah	18 October 2005 (age 21)	10	4	(Egyptian Football Association) Al Ahly
11	FW	Mohanad Mohamed	1 January 2005 (age 21)	6	0	(Egyptian Football Association) Al Mokawloon
15	FW	Omar Khedr	25 May 2006 (age 20)	12	0	(The Football Association) Aston Villa
17	FW	Amr Khaled	6 October 2005 (age 21)	13	0	(Swiss Football Association) FC Wohlen
18	FW	Mohamed Raafat	1 January 2005 (age 21)	4	0	(Egyptian Football Association) Al Ahly
19	FW	Mohamed Haitham	17 February 2007 (age 19)	0	0	(Egyptian Football Association) Al Ahly
20	FW	Ahmed Sharaf	4 August 2005 (age 21)	6	0	(Egyptian Football Association) Al Masry
26	FW	Omar Osama Hassan	1 January 2005 (age 21)	1	0	(Egyptian Football Association) ENPPI

== See also ==
- U-20 Africa Cup of Nations
- Egypt national football team
- Egypt Olympic football team
- Egypt national under-17 football team
