= Reda Laalaoui =

Moroccan footballer (born 2005)

Personal information
- Date of birth: 11 May 2005 (age 21)
- Place of birth: Rabat, Morocco
- Position: Midfielder

Team information
- Current team: Westerlo
- Number: 12

Youth career
- –2023: FUS Rabat

Senior career*
Years	Team	Apps	(Gls)
2023–2025	FUS Rabat	51	(5)
2025–	Westerlo	5	(0)

International career^{‡}
2023–2025	Morocco U20	24	(6)
- * Club domestic league appearances and goals as of 18:52, 16 August 2026 (UTC) ‡ National team caps and goals as of 11:43, 12 June 2025 (UTC)

Reda Laalaoui (born 11 May 2005) is a Moroccan professional footballer who plays as a midfielder for Belgian Pro League club Westerlo.

== Club career ==
=== FUS Rabat ===
Laalaoui was born in Rabat, and joined local club FUS Rabat at an early age. He made his professional debut with the senior team on 15 April 2023, appearing as a late substitute in his side's 1–0 away loss to RS Berkane. His first start came two months later, on 17 June, in a 2–1 home win over SCC Mohammédia.

However, Laalaoui would have to wait until 7 February 2024 to score his first professional goal. Having come off the bench in the second half, he scored a 95th-minute winner at home to Wydad Casablanca to secure a dramatic 2–1 victory. In spite of this, Laalaoui's best performance for his boyhood club was arguably on 15 March 2025. In a league fixture at home to JS Soualem, he scored once and assisted twice to help complete a 4–2 win.

=== Hull City ===
On 12 June 2025, it was announced that Laalaoui had joined EFL Championship side Hull City, arriving on a four-year deal for a rumoured £400,000. However, a few weeks later, on 4 July, the club received a fee-restricting transfer embargo which put Laalaoui's transfer in jeopardy. Despite an appeal which shortened the length of the embargo, Laalaoui saw his move annulled, and he became a free agent as a result.

=== Westerlo ===
Laalaoui soon found a new home, arriving at Belgian Pro League side Westerlo on 8 September 2025.

== International career ==
=== Youth level ===
Laalaoui has regularly represented his nation at youth level. On 16 May 2023, he made his debut for the U20s, playing the entirety of a 3–0 win over Burkina Faso. He scored his first goal later that year, on 12 October, netting a 93rd-minute equaliser against South Korea U18s. Laalaoui was also a member of the squad who were runners-up at the 2025 U-20 Africa Cup of Nations. Featuring in five out of six games at the tournament, including the final, he scored one goal.

== Playing style ==
Laalaoui is a right-footed, box-to-box midfielder, but can also play in more advanced roles, both through the middle and on the right. He has previously been compared to Real Madrid and England talent Jude Bellingham.

== Honours ==
Morocco U20s

- UNAF U-20 Tournament runner-up: 2023
- UNAF U-20 Tournament winner: 2024
- U-20 Africa Cup of Nations runner-up: 2025
