= Anas Tajaouart =

Moroccan footballer (born 2005)

Personal information
- Date of birth: 7 September 2005 (age 21)
- Place of birth: Brussels, Belgium
- Height: 1.66 m (5 ft 5 in)
- Position: Central midfielder

Team information
- Current team: RAAL La Louvière (on loan from Anderlecht)
- Number: 78

Youth career
- 2011–2013: FC Jeunesse Molenbeek
- 2013–2022: Anderlecht

Senior career*
Years	Team	Apps	(Gls)
2022–	RSCA Futures	58	(6)
2025–	Anderlecht	1	(0)
2026–	→ RAAL La Louvière (loan)	1	(0)

International career^{‡}
2023–2025	Morocco U20	14	(1)
Medal record
Men's football
Representing Morocco
FIFA U-20 World Cup
Winner	2025 Chile
UNAF U-20 Tournament
Runner-up	2023 Tunisia
- * Club domestic league appearances and goals as of 16 August 2026 ‡ National team caps and goals as of 19 October 2025

Anas Tajaouart (born 7 September 2005) is a professional footballer who plays as a central midfielder for Belgian Pro League club RAAL La Louvière on loan from Anderlecht. Born in Belgium, he has represented Morocco at youth international level.

== Early life and career ==
Tajaouart was born in Brussels, Belgium, into a Moroccan family and grew up in Berchem-Sainte-Agathe in the Brussels region, where he was registered from a very young age with FC Jeunesse Molenbeek.

== Club career ==
Tajaouart joined the RSC Anderlecht youth academy in 2013. He developed as a central midfielder. In May 2022, he signed his first professional contract at the age of sixteen. On 26 February 2023, he made his professional debut, coming on as a substitute for David Hubert in stoppage time against K Beerschot VA (0–0 draw) under manager Guillaume Gillet.

Midway through the 2023–2024 season, Tajaouart became the new captain of RSCA Futures. On 20 April 2024, he scored his first professional goal against Club NXT, assisted by Mohamed Bouchouari (1–2 defeat). On 26 December 2024, he extended his contract, keeping him with the club until 2029.

On 24 July 2025, Tajaouart made his first appearance with the RSC Anderlecht first team under coach Besnik Hasi, against BK Häcken in the Europa League, coming on as a substitute for Tristan Degreef in added time (1–0 victory).

On 17 July 2026, he was loaned by RAAL La Louvière, with an option to buy.

== International career ==
In November 2023, Tajaouart participated in the UNAF U-20 Tournament in Tunisia with Morocco's under-20 team and managed to finish as runner-up in this competition, scoring a goal in the first match against Libya.

In September 2025, Tajaouart was called up by Mohammed Ouahbi to participate in the FIFA U-20 World Cup held in Chile. His team defeated Spain and Brazil, and finished first in their group. They reached the final after a victory against France. Morocco defeated Argentina 2–0 in the final, winning their first FIFA tournament final.

== Style of play ==
A creative central midfielder, Tajaouart plays forward, takes risks to break lines, and injects a lot of intensity; Anderlecht describes him as a technically gifted and tactically astute playmaker. At Neerpede, his coaches emphasize his great technical ability and bravery on the pitch despite his late development, qualities that shape his profile as a midfield leader. The Belgian press highlights his vision and quality in the final pass, while noting that he still needs to gain physical strength; a lively player with a style similar to Théo Leoni.

== Career statistics ==
As of match played 22 March 2026

Appearances and goals by club, season and competition
Club	Season	League			Belgian Cup		Europe		Other		Total	
Club	Season	Division	Apps	Goals	Apps	Goals	Apps	Goals	Apps	Goals	Apps	Goals
RSCA Futures	2022–23	Challenger Pro League	5	0	—		—		—		5	0
RSCA Futures	2023–24	Challenger Pro League	24	1	—		—		—		24	1
RSCA Futures	2024–25	Challenger Pro League	18	3	—		—		—		18	3
RSCA Futures	2025–26	Challenger Pro League	14	1	—		—		2 (Note: Appearances in Premier League Cup)	0	16	1
RSCA Futures	Total		61	5	—		—		2	0	63	5
Anderlecht	2025–26	Belgian Pro League	1	0	1	0	1 (Note: Appearance in UEFA Europa League)	0	—		3	0
Career total			62	5	1	0	1	0	2	0	66	5

== Honours ==
Morocco U20

- UNAF U-20 Tournament runner-up: 2023
- FIFA U-20 World Cup: 2025
