= Youssef Snana =

Tunisian footballer (born 2004)

Personal information
- Date of birth: 24 March 2004 (age 22)
- Place of birth: Tunisia
- Height: 1.83 m (6 ft 0 in)
- Position: Striker

Team information
- Current team: Al-Shamal

Youth career
- Club Africain

Senior career*
Years	Team	Apps	(Gls)
2021–2025	Club Africain	19	(0)
2024–2025	→Zarzis (loan)	29	(13)
2025–	Al-Shamal	0	(0)
2025–2026	→Al-Sailiya (loan)	16	(4)

International career^{‡}
2021–2023	Tunisia U20	21	(4)
2025–	Tunisia	1	(0)
- * Club domestic league appearances and goals as of 16:00, 26 June 2026 (UTC) ‡ National team caps and goals as of 13:25, 27 October 2025 (UTC)

Youssef Snana (Arabic: يوسف سنانة; born 24 March 2004) is a Tunisian professional football player who plays as a striker for Qatar Stars League club Al-Shamal, and the Tunisia national team.

== Club career ==
A youth product of Club Africain, he signed his first professional contract with the club on 23 March 2021 until 2024. On 31 June 2024, he joined Zarzis on a season-long loan. On 1 July 2025, he signed a contract with Al-Shamal until 2030. He was shortly after loan to Al-Shamal for the 2025–26 season.

== International career ==
Snana played for the Tunisia U20s at the 2021 U-20 Africa Cup of Nations. He helped the U20s come fourth for the 2023 U-20 Africa Cup of Nations. He also was part of the U20 squad for the 2023 FIFA U-20 World Cup.

In May 2025 Snana was called up to the Tunisia national team for a set of friendlies, debuting in a 2–0 win over Burkina Faso on 2 June 2025.

== Honours ==
Tunisia U20

- UNAF U-20 Tournament: 2021, 2022
