= Rayan Nasraoui =

French footballer (born 2003)

Personal information
- Full name: Rayan Salim Nasraoui Soulie
- Date of birth: 27 June 2003 (age 23)
- Place of birth: France
- Height: 1.75 m (5 ft 9 in)
- Position: Left-back

Team information
- Current team: Espoir de Hammam Sousse

Youth career
- Nîmes

Senior career*
Years	Team	Apps	(Gls)
2021–2023	Nîmes II	20	(0)
2022–2023	Nîmes	2	(0)
2023–	Étoile Sportive du Sahel	0	(0)
2023–	→ Espoir de Hammam Sousse (loan)	0	(0)

International career^{‡}
2022–	Tunisia U20	4	(0)
- * Club domestic league appearances and goals as of 25 May 2023 ‡ National team caps and goals as of 05:17, 24 February 2023 (UTC)

Rayan Salim Nasraoui Soulie (Arabic: ريان سليم نصراوي سولي; born 27 June 2003) is a professional footballer who plays as a left-back for Tunisian club Espoir de Hammam Sousse on loan from Étoile Sportive du Sahel. Born in France, he is a youth international for Tunisia.

== Club career ==
Nasraoui is a youth product of Nîmes, and worked his way up their youth categories until debuting for their reserves in 2021. He made his professional debut with Nîmes as a late substitute in a 2–1 Ligue 2 loss to Dijon on 22 August 2022.

== International career ==
Born in France, Nasraoui is of Tunisian descent. He was first called up to the Tunisia U20s for a set of friendlies in September 2022. He represented the Tunisia U20s in their winning campaign at the 2022 UNAF U-20 Tournament. He also made the squad for the 2023 Africa U-20 Cup of Nations.

== Style of play ==
Nasraoui is primarily a left-back, but can also play as a left winger.

== Honours ==
Tunisia U20

- UNAF U-20 Tournament: 2022 UNAF U-20 Tournament
