= 2012 UNAF U-20 Tournament =

The 2012 UNAF U-20 Tournament was an association football competition played twice in 2012:

- 2012 UNAF U-20 Tournament (March)
- 2012 UNAF U-20 Tournament (December)
