= Hakim Mesbahi =

Moroccan footballer (born 2005)

Personal information
- Full name: Abdelhakim Mesbahi
- Date of birth: 7 September 2005 (age 21)
- Place of birth: Casablanca, Morocco
- Height: 1.87 m (6 ft 2 in)
- Position: Goalkeeper

Team information
- Current team: AS FAR
- Number: 1

Senior career*
Years	Team	Apps	(Gls)
2025–	AS FAR	1	(0)

International career^{‡}
2023–	Morocco U20	19	(0)
Medal record
Men's football
Representing Morocco
FIFA U-20 World Cup
Winner	2025 Chile
- * Club domestic league appearances and goals as of 14:02, 19 September 2025 (UTC) ‡ National team caps and goals as of 14:02, 19 September 2025 (UTC)

Abdelhakim Mesbahi (Arabic: عبد الحكيم المصباحي; born 7 September 2005) is a Moroccan professional footballer who plays as a goalkeeper for Botola Pro club AS FAR.

== Club career ==
Born in Casablanca, Morocco, Mesbahi joined the AS FAR youth academy at a young age.

On 2 February 2025, Mesbahi played his first professional match with AS FAR, starting against Olympique Dcheira in the Excellence Cup, under manager Hubert Velud. A few days later, Velud left the club to be replaced by Alexandre Santos. During the 2024–2025 season, Mesbahi was regularly called up to AS FAR's first team.

== International career ==
During an international break in May 2023, Mesbahi played his first minutes with the Morocco U20 team at the Mohammed VI Football Complex for a double header against Burkina Faso, called up by manager Mohammed Ouahbi (a 3–0 win and a 3–1 loss).

Mesbahi was then called up to take part in the Africa Cup of Nations. On 15 May 2025, his team qualified for the final of the African Cup of Nations with a 0–1 victory against Egypt.

In September 2025, Mesbahi was called up for the U-20 World Cup in Chile.

== Honours ==
AS FAR

- CAF Champions League runner-up: 2025–26

Morocco U20

- FIFA U-20 World Cup: 2025
- UNAF U-20 Tournament: 2024
- U-20 Africa Cup of Nations runner-up: 2025
