= 2023 UNAF U-20 Tournament =

Tournament details
- Country: Tunisia
- Dates: 13–21 November 2023
- Teams: 5

Final positions
- Champions: Tunisia (9th title)
- Runners-up: Morocco
- Third place: Egypt

Tournament statistics
- Matches played: 10
- Goals scored: 48 (4.8 per match)

The 2023 UNAF U-20 Tournament was the 16th edition of the UNAF U-20 Tournament. The tournament took place in Tunisia, from 13 to 21 November 2023. Tunisia won the title for the ninth time after topping the standings.

== Participants ==
The five participating teams were:

- Algeria
- Egypt
- Libya
- Morocco
- Tunisia (hosts)

== Venues ==
| Cities | Venues |
|---|---|
| Ariana | Farhat Hached stadium |

== Tournament ==
| Pos | Team | Pld | W | D | L | GF | GA | GD | Pts | Qualification |
|---|---|---|---|---|---|---|---|---|---|---|
| 1 | Tunisia (H) | 4 | 4 | 0 | 0 | 15 | 6 | +9 | 12 | Winner |
| 2 | Morocco | 4 | 2 | 1 | 1 | 12 | 7 | +5 | 7 | |
| 3 | Egypt | 4 | 1 | 2 | 1 | 8 | 7 | +1 | 5 | |
| 4 | Libya | 4 | 1 | 1 | 2 | 6 | 14 | −8 | 4 | |
| 5 | Algeria | 4 | 0 | 0 | 4 | 7 | 14 | −7 | 0 | |

First match(es) will be played: 21 November 2023. Source: UNAF
Rules for classification: 1) Points; 2) Goal difference; 3) Goals scored
(H) Hosts

=== Matches ===
13 November 2023

| Libya | 0–6 | Morocco |
|---|---|---|
| | Report | Laalaoui 21', 45+2'; Zabiri 29', 54'; Essadak 47'; Tajaouart 79' |

Farhat Hached stadium, Ariana
13 November 2023

| Tunisia | 4–2 | Algeria |
|---|---|---|
| Issawi 44' (pen.); Kada 45+2', 52'; Ayari 55' | Report | Akhrib 45+4'; Kolli 82' |

Farhat Hached stadium, Ariana

15 November 2023

| Egypt | 1–1 | Libya |
|---|---|---|
| Zaalouk 90+2' | Report | Abdelkhalik 31' |

Farhat Hached stadium, Ariana
15 November 2023

| Morocco | 3–2 | Algeria |
|---|---|---|
| Dahak 21'; Byar 39'; Boumassaoudi 90+1' | Report | Fatahine 45'; Kohili 59' (pen.) |

Farhat Hached stadium, Ariana

17 November 2023

| Algeria | 0–3 | Egypt |
|---|---|---|
| | Report | Khaled 11'; Abdallah 47'; Kabaka 87' (pen.) |

Farhat Hached stadium, Ariana
17 November 2023

| Tunisia | 3–1 | Morocco |
|---|---|---|
| Becha 8', 71'; Ben Ali 90' | Report | Laalaoui 15' |

Farhat Hached stadium, Ariana

19 November 2023

| Algeria | 3–4 | Libya |
|---|---|---|
| Aissaoui 20'; Kolli 21'; Ben Ahmed 41' (pen.) | Report | Al Jihan 69', 75'; Abdallah 81', 90+4' |

Farhat Hached stadium, Ariana
19 November 2023

| Tunisia | 4–2 | Egypt |
|---|---|---|
| Kada 22' (pen.), 26'; Becha 23', 45+3' | Report | El Hadad 80'; Rabiaa 90+3' |

Farhat Hached stadium, Ariana

21 November 2023

| Egypt | 2–2 | Morocco |
|---|---|---|
| Mahmoud 84', 90+4' | Report | Zabiri 7'; Fettal 69' |

Farhat Hached stadium, Ariana
21 November 2023

| Libya | 1–4 | Tunisia |
|---|---|---|
| Skuzi 42' (pen.) | Report | Ayari 23'; Ben Farhat 29' (pen.); Ben Ali 47'; Issaoui 55' |

Farhat Hached stadium, Ariana

== Champion ==
2023 UNAF U-20 Tournament winners

Tunisia
Ninth title
