= Nasraoui =

Nasraoui is a surname. Notable people with the name include:

== Surname ==
- Lamine Yamal Nasraoui Ebana (born 2007), Spanish footballer
- Mohamed Nasraoui (born 2002), Tunisian footballer
- Radhia Nasraoui (born 1953), Tunisian lawyer
- Rayan Nasraoui (born 2003), French footballer
