= 2019 UNAF U-20 Tournament =

Tournament details
- Country: Tunisia
- Dates: 23 November – 1 December
- Teams: 5

Final positions
- Champions: Tunisia (5th title)
- Runners-up: Egypt
- Third place: Algeria

Tournament statistics
- Matches played: 10
- Goals scored: 20 (2 per match)

The 2019 UNAF U-20 Tournament is the 12th edition of the UNAF U-20 Tournament. The tournament will take place in Tunisia, from 23 November to 1 December 2019.

== Participants ==
- Algeria
- Burkina Faso (invited)
- Egypt
- Libya (withdrew)
- Morocco
- Tunisia (hosts)

== Venues ==
| Cities | Venues | Capacity |
|---|---|---|
| Le Kram | Stade municipal du Kram | 5,000 |

== Tournament ==
| Pos | Team | Pld | W | D | L | GF | GA | GD | Pts | Qualification |
|---|---|---|---|---|---|---|---|---|---|---|
| 1 | Tunisia (H) | 4 | 2 | 1 | 1 | 5 | 4 | +1 | 7 | Winners |
| 2 | Egypt | 4 | 2 | 1 | 1 | 5 | 4 | +1 | 7 | |
| 3 | Algeria | 4 | 2 | 0 | 2 | 6 | 5 | +1 | 6 | |
| 4 | Morocco | 4 | 1 | 2 | 1 | 3 | 4 | −1 | 5 | |
| 5 | Burkina Faso | 4 | 0 | 2 | 2 | 1 | 3 | −2 | 2 | |

Updated to match(es) played on 1 December 2019. Source: AFF
Rules for classification: 1) Points; 2) Goal difference; 3) Goals scored
(H) Hosts

=== Matches ===
23 November 2019
11:00

| Morocco | 0–0 | Burkina Faso |
|---|---|---|
| | Report |

Stade municipal du Kram, Le Kram
23 November 2019
13:30

| Tunisia | 0–2 | Algeria |
|---|---|---|
| | Report | Zarouki 17' (pen.), 61' |

Stade municipal du Kram, Le Kram

25 November 2019
11:00

| Algeria | 2–1 | Burkina Faso |
|---|---|---|
| Bara 7'; Zarouki 68' (pen.) | Report | Diakité 43' (pen.) |

Stade municipal du Kram, Le Kram
25 November 2019
13:30

| Egypt | 2–0 | Morocco |
|---|---|---|
| Ibrahim Adel 55'; Arabi Badr 63' | Report |

Stade municipal du Kram, Le Kram

27 November 2019
11:00

| Egypt | 0–0 | Burkina Faso |
|---|---|---|
| | Report |

Stade municipal du Kram, Le Kram
27 November 2019
13:30

| Tunisia | 1–1 | Morocco |
|---|---|---|
| Ghariani 75' | Report | Mbarek 53' (pen.) |

Stade municipal du Kram, Le Kram

29 November 2019
11:00

| Algeria | 1–2 | Egypt |
|---|---|---|
| Belkheir 17' | Report | Ibrahim Adel 7' (pen.); Osama Faisal 68' |

Stade municipal du Kram, Le Kram
29 November 2019
13:30

| Burkina Faso | 0–1 | Tunisia |
|---|---|---|
| | Report | Habbassi 50' |

Stade municipal du Kram, Le Kram

1 December 2019
11:00

| Morocco | 2–1 | Algeria |
|---|---|---|
| Mbarek 2'; Tamoudi 73' | Report | Zarouki 64' |

Stade municipal du Kram, Le Kram

1 December 2019
13:30

| Tunisia | 3–1 | Egypt |
|---|---|---|
| Ghram 20' (pen.); Abidi 51'; Berrima 80' | Report | Mahmoud Saber 10' |

Stade municipal du Kram, Le Kram

== Champion ==
2019 UNAF U-20 Tournament winners

Tunisia
Fifth title

== Scorers ==
4 goals

- (Algeria) Marwan Zarouki

2 goals

- (Egypt) Ibrahim Adel
- (Morocco) Mehdi Mbarek

1 goal

- (Algeria) Khalil Bara
- (Algeria) Mohamed Islam Belkheir
- (Burkina Faso) Ibrahim Diakité
- (Egypt) Osama Faisal
- (Egypt) Arabi Badr
- (Egypt) Mahmoud Saber AbdelMohsen
- (Morocco) Yacine Tamoudi
- (Tunisia) Bechir Ghariani
- (Tunisia) Achraf Habbassi
- (Tunisia) Alaa Ghram
- (Tunisia) Chiheb Abidi
- (Tunisia) Zied Berrima

== Awards ==
- Golden ball:
- Golden boot:
- Golden glove:
- Fair play trophy:
