= 1977 African Youth Qualifying for World Cup =

Inaugural youth football qualification tournament

- Teams: (from 1 confederation)

Final positions
- Champions: Ivory Coast; Morocco

The 1977 African Youth Qualifying for World Cup was the debut qualification tournament for African nations for the FIFA World Youth Championship. Ivory Coast and Morocco qualified for the inaugural FIFA World Youth Championship which took place in Tunisia. This was the only edition of the tournament not titled the African Youth Championship.

== Final round ==
Team 1	Agg.	Team 2	1st leg	2nd leg
Guinea	0–4	Morocco	0–1	0–3
Egypt	3–3	Ivory Coast	1–0	2–3^{1}

Guinea	0−1	Morocco

Morocco	3−0	Guinea

Morocco qualified after 4−0 on aggregate.

Egypt	1−0	Ivory Coast

Ivory Coast	3−2 (abd.)	Egypt

^1 The match was abandoned with Ivory Coast leading 3–2 after Egypt walked off to protest the awarding of a penalty against them; Ivory Coast qualified.

== Qualification to the World Youth Championship ==
The two best performing teams qualified for the 1977 FIFA World Youth Championship.

- Ivory Coast
- Morocco
