= Marwan Salah =

Egyptian footballer (born 2004)

Personal information
- Date of birth: 1 January 2004 (age 22)
- Height: 1.88 m (6 ft 2 in)
- Position: Goalkeeper

Youth career
- 2012–2021: Al Ahly
- 2021–2022: Smouha

International career
Years	Team	Apps	(Gls)
2020–2022	Egypt U20	8	(0)

Marwan Salah (Arabic: مَرْوَان صَلَاح; born 1 January 2004) is an Egyptian professional footballer who plays as a goalkeeper.

== Club career ==
Salah joined the academy of Al Ahly at the age of eight, but after the club decided to merge some of their youth teams together, he was released along with four other goalkeepers. He came across an announcement by German club Bayern Munich in March 2021, stating that they would be signing fifteen players for their "World Squad" initiative - a squad to represent the Bavarian club in international friendlies.

He sent in some highlight videos, and was selected the following year as one of the twenty final players from total of over 2500. Having featured in a number of friendlies with the side, he was injured before the final game against the Bayern Munich youth team.

In October 2021, he joined Egyptian club Smouha. Following his experience with Bayern Munich, Salah stated that he had received offers from a number of German sides, and did not want to return to Smouha in Egypt. He was strongly linked with a move to Italian side Catania in September 2022, being pictured in a club shirt with club officials, but this move was never confirmed.

== International career ==
Salah has been called up to Egypt's youth international training camps.
