= Fouad Zahouani =

Moroccan footballer

Personal information
- Date of birth: 18 April 2006 (age 20)
- Place of birth: Casablanca, Morocco
- Height: 1.81 m (5 ft 11 in)
- Position: Left-back

Team information
- Current team: Jong Ajax

Youth career
- 2016–2025: Mohammed VI Football Academy

Senior career*
Years	Team	Apps	(Gls)
2025–2026	Union Touarga	24	(1)
2026–	Jong Ajax	0	(0)

International career^{‡}
2022–2023	Morocco U17	12	(0)
2023	Morocco U18	1	(0)
2024–2026	Morocco U20	20	(1)
2025–	Morocco U23	2	(0)
2025	Morocco A'	1	(0)
Medal record
Men's football
Representing Morocco
FIFA U-20 World Cup
Winner	2025 Chile
African Nations Championship
Winner	2024 Kenya-Tanzania-Uganda
- * Club domestic league appearances and goals as of 18 May 2025 ‡ National team caps and goals as of 18 May 2025

Fouad Zahouani (born 18 April 2006) is a Moroccan professional footballer who plays as a left-back for Eerste Divisie club Jong Ajax and the Morocco national under-23 team.

== Club career ==
Zahouani was part of the Mohammed VI Football Academy from 2016 to 2025.

In February 2023, he participated in the Mohammed VI U19 tournament as a left-back. He started in group stage matches against Marseille and Rangers, helping his team eliminate PSV Eindhoven in the quarter-finals. The academy was eliminated in the semi-finals by Génération Foot on penalties.

In January 2025, Zahouani joined Union Touarga in the Botola (Moroccan top division). He made his first start on 5 January 2025 in a 3–0 loss against MAS.

On 26 June 2026, Zahouani moved to Ajax in the Netherlands on a three-year contract, initially expected to join their reserves team Jong Ajax.

== International career ==
Zahouani was first called up to the Morocco U17 team in 2022 for the Arab Cup U-17 in Algeria. He started every match as Morocco reached the final, losing to the hosts on penalties. The final was followed by a widely publicised altercation between players of both sides.

In 2023, he was part of the Morocco squad for the 2023 U-17 Africa Cup of Nations in Algeria, starting every match as Morocco finished runners-up and qualified for the 2023 FIFA U-17 World Cup.

In October 2023, he made his debut for Morocco U18 in a friendly against England U18. Later that month, he was included in the final squad for the FIFA U-17 World Cup in Indonesia, where Morocco reached the quarter-finals.

In 2024, Zahouani joined the Morocco U20 team, winning the UNAF U-20 Tournament and finishing runners-up at the 2025 U-20 Africa Cup of Nations. His performances earned him a place in the tournament's team of the competition.

== Honours ==
Morocco U17

- Arab Cup U-17 runner-up: 2022
- U-17 Africa Cup of Nations runner-up: 2023

Morocco U20

- FIFA U-20 World Cup: 2025
- UNAF U-20 Tournament: 2024
- U-20 Africa Cup of Nations runner-up: 2025

Morocco A'

- African Nations Championship: 2024

Individual

- U-20 Africa Cup of Nations Team of the Tournament: 2025
