= Moataz Mohamed =

Egyptian footballer (born 2005)

Personal information
- Full name: Moataz Mohamed Ibrahim Masoud El Sayed
- Date of birth: 20 March 2005 (age 21)
- Place of birth: Kafr El Dawwar, Egypt
- Height: 1.82 m (6 ft 0 in)
- Position: Center back

Team information
- Current team: Al Ahly
- Number: 34

Youth career
- 2012–2023: Al Ahly

Senior career*
Years	Team	Apps	(Gls)
2023–	Al Ahly	1	(0)

International career^{‡}
2023–	Egypt U19	4	(0)
	Egypt U20	0	(0)
- * Club domestic league appearances and goals as of 23:14, 10 January 2024 (UTC) ‡ National team caps and goals as of 23:14, 10 January 2024 (UTC)

Moataz Mohamed Ibrahim Masoud El Sayed (Arabic: معتز محمد; born 20 March 2005) is an Egyptian professional footballer who plays as a centre-back for Egyptian Premier League club Al Ahly.

== Honours ==
Al Ahly

- Egyptian Premier League: 2022–23
- Egypt Cup: 2022–23
- Egyptian Super Cup: 2023–24
- CAF Champions League: 2023–24
