= Bilal Ouali =

Algerian footballer (born 1993)

Personal information
- Date of birth: 7 October 1993 (age 33)
- Place of birth: Étampes, France
- Height: 1.84 m (6 ft 1/2 in)
- Position: Midfielder

Youth career
- 2007–2011: Reims

Senior career*
Years	Team	Apps	(Gls)
2011–2014	Reims	4	(0)
2014–2015	Mons	4	(0)
2015	CRB		
Total		8	(0)

International career
2012–2014	Algeria U20	5	(3)
- * Club domestic league appearances and goals

Bilal Ouali (Arabic: بلال الوالي; born 7 October 1993) is an Algerian former footballer who plays as a midfielder.

== Personal ==
Ouali was born in Étampes, France, to an Algerian father and Moroccan mother.

== Club career ==
At age 14, Ouali joined Reims' academy. On 5 August 2011, he made his professional debut for the club, coming on in the 67th minute in a Ligue 2 encounter against Amiens.

== International career ==
In October 2012, Ouali was called up to the Algeria under-20 national team for a pair of friendlies against Paris FC and Troyes, scoring a goal from the penalty spot in the first game.

In 2013 Ouali has signed a contract with Stade de Reims.
