= Arabi Badr =

Egyptian footballer (born 2001)

Al-Arabi Badr
Personal information
- Full name: Al-Arabi Badr Mokhtar
- Date of birth: 23 October 2001 (age 25)
- Place of birth: Egypt
- Position: Defensive midfielder

Team information
- Current team: Tala'ea El Gaish (on loan from Al Ahly)

Youth career
- 2018–2020: Al Ahly

Senior career*
Years	Team	Apps	(Gls)
2020–2023	Al Ahly	5	(0)
2020–2021	→ El Gouna (loan)	21	(0)
2021–2022	→ Future (loan)	18	(1)
2022–2023	→ Tala'ea El Gaish (loan)	12	(1)
2023–	Al Mokawloon	0	(0)

International career^{‡}
2020–	Egypt U20	1	(0)
2023–	Egypt U23	1	(1)
- * Club domestic league appearances and goals as of 21 September 2021 ‡ National team caps and goals as of 23:14, 11 September 2023 (UTC)

Al-Arabi Badr Mokhtar (Arabic: العربي بدر مختار; born 23 October 2001) is an Egyptian professional footballer who plays as a defensive midfielder for Tala'ea El Gaish on loan from Al Ahly.

== Career statistics ==
=== Club ===
As of 14 July 2023.

Appearances and goals by club, season and competition
Club	Season	League			Cup		Continental		Other		Total	
Club	Season	Division	Apps	Goals	Apps	Goals	Apps	Goals	Apps	Goals	Apps	Goals
Al Ahly	2019–20	Egyptian Premier League	5	0	1	0	0	0	0	0	6	0
Al Ahly	2020–21	Egyptian Premier League	0	0	0	0	0	0	0	0	0	0
Al Ahly	Total		5	0	1	0	0	0	0	0	6	0
El Gouna (loan)	2020–2021	Egyptian Premier League	21	0	0	0	—				21	0
Future FC (loan)	2021–2022	Egyptian Premier League	18	1	0	0	—				18	1
Tala'ea El Gaish (loan)	2022–2023	Egyptian Premier League	12	1	0	0	—				12	1
Al Mokawloon	2023–24	Egyptian Premier League	0	0	0	0	—				0	0
Career total			56	2	1	0	0	0	0	0	57	2
