= 2021 UNAF U-20 Tournament =

Tournament details
- Country: Tunisia
- Dates: 8–17 November 2021
- Teams: 5

Final positions
- Champions: Tunisia (7th title)
- Runners-up: Egypt
- Third place: Mauritania

Tournament statistics
- Matches played: 10
- Goals scored: 30 (3 per match)
- Top goal scorer: 4

Awards
- Best player: (Mauritania) Ely Housseinou Sy

The 2021 UNAF U-20 Tournament is the 14th edition of the UNAF U-20 Tournament. The tournament will take place in Tunisia, from 8 to 17 November 2021.

== Participants ==
- Algeria
- Egypt
- Libya
- Mauritania (invited)
- Morocco (withdrew)
- Tunisia (hosts)

== Venues ==
Cities	Venues	Capacity
Ariana	Stade municipal d'Ariana	7,000
Carthage	Stade municipal de Carthage	5,000

== Tournament ==
Pos	Team	Pld	W	D	L	GF	GA	GD	Pts	Qualification
1	Tunisia (H)	4	3	1	0	11	4	+7	10	Winners
2	Egypt	4	3	0	1	6	5	+1	9	
3	Mauritania	4	1	2	1	6	6	0	5	
4	Algeria	4	1	0	3	4	6	−2	3	
5	Libya	4	0	1	3	3	9	−6	1	

Updated to match(es) played on 17 November 2021. Source: UNAF
Rules for classification: 1) Points; 2) Goal difference; 3) Goals scored
(H) Hosts

=== Matches ===
9 November 2021
14:00

Tunisia	3–2	Algeria
Kechiche 37'; Dridi 90'; Sghaïer 90+3'	Report	Rahou 35'; Casado Noa 53' (pen.)

Stade municipal d'Ariana, Ariana
Referee: Abdelmoumen Al-Raii (Libya)
9 November 2021
14:00

Egypt	2–1	Libya
Zaki 13'; Abdelhamid 18'	Report	Al Ferjani 77'

Stade municipal de Carthage, Carthage
Referee: Tayeb Bouderbala (Algeria)

11 November 2021
14:00

Tunisia	1–1	Mauritania
Whaibi 51'	Report	Sy 23'

Stade municipal d'Ariana, Ariana
Referee: Tarek Elsayed Kacem (Egypt)
11 November 2021
14:00

Algeria	0–1	Egypt
	Report	Abdelhamid 21'

Stade municipal de Carthage, Carthage
Referee: Faraj Abdellaoui (Tunisia)

13 November 2021
14:00

Egypt	2–1	Mauritania
Abdelwahab 14' (pen.); Ahmed 50'	Report	Sy 63'

Stade municipal d'Ariana, Ariana
Referee: Abdelmoumen Al-Raii (Libya)
13 November 2021
14:00

Libya	0–1	Algeria
	Report	Bounaas 30'

Stade municipal de Carthage, Carthage
Referee: Nabil Ben Rokaya (Morocco)

15 November 2021
14:00

Tunisia	4–0	Libya
Garreb 37'; Whaibi 45+2'; Kechiche 52' (pen.); Lahmidi 86'	Report

Stade municipal d'Ariana, Ariana
Referee: Mahaji Tayeb Bouderyel (Algeria)
15 November 2021
14:00

Mauritania	2–1	Algeria
Diadié 45+1' (pen.); Sy 89'	Report	Rahou 3'

Stade municipal de Carthage, Carthage
Referee: Mohamed Sayed Kacem (Egypt)

17 November 2021
14:00

Tunisia	3–1	Egypt
Snana 45' (pen.); Mehri 50'; Snana 73'	Report	Ahmed 12'

Stade municipal d'Ariana, Ariana
Referee: Nabil Ben Rokaya (Morocco)
17 November 2021
13:00

Mauritania	2–2	Libya
M’Bareck 54' (pen.); Sy 76'	Report	Mohamed 58'; Al Ferjani 87'

Stade municipal de Carthage, Carthage
Referee: Faraj Abdellaoui (Tunisia)

== Champion ==
2021 UNAF U-20 Tournament winners

Tunisia
Seventh title

== Scorers ==
4 goals

- (Mauritania) Ely Housseinou Sy

2 goals

- (Algeria) Jorès Rahou
- (Egypt) Ahmed Helmi Abdelhamid
- (Egypt) Abderrahman Zaki Ahmed
- (Libya) Abdallah Faraj Al Ferjani
- (Tunisia) Ghaith Whaibi
- (Tunisia) Mohamed Amine Kechiche
- (Tunisia) Youssef Snana

1 goal

- (Algeria) Sarvantes Casado Noa
- (Algeria) Idriss Bounaas
- (Egypt) Ahmed Cherif Zaki
- (Egypt) Ahmed Fathi Abdelwahab
- (Libya) Fahd Mohamed
- (Mauritania) Mohamed Ali Diadié
- (Mauritania) Issa M’Bareck
- (Tunisia) Yassine Dridi
- (Tunisia) Makram Sghaïer
- (Tunisia) Adem Garreb
- (Tunisia) Malcom Jamal Lahmidi
- (Tunisia) Malek Mehri

== Awards ==
- Golden ball:
- Golden boot:
- Golden glove:
- Fair play trophy: Libya
