= 2008 UNAF U-20 Tournament =

Tournament details
- Country: Morocco
- Dates: 5–14 June
- Teams: 5

Final positions
- Champions: Egypt (2nd title)
- Runners-up: Tunisia
- Third place: Morocco

Tournament statistics
- Matches played: 10
- Goals scored: 19 (1.9 per match)

The 2008 UNAF U-20 Tournament was the 4th edition of the UNAF U-20 Tournament. The tournament took place in Morocco, from 5 to 14 June 2008. Egypt wins the tournament for the second time.

== Participants ==
- Algeria
- Egypt
- Libya
- Morocco (hosts)
- Tunisia

== Venue ==
- Stade Père Jégo, Casablanca

== Tournament ==
Team	Pld	W	D	L	GF	GA	GD	Pts
Egypt	4	2	2	0	4	1	+3	8
Tunisia	4	2	2	0	5	3	+2	8
Morocco	4	2	0	2	5	4	+1	6
Libya	4	0	2	2	4	7	-3	2
Algeria	4	0	2	2	1	4	-3	2

=== Matches ===
5 June 2008

Egypt	2–1	Libya

Stade Père Jégo, Casablanca
5 June 2008

Tunisia	1–0	Morocco
Sassi

Stade Père Jégo, Casablanca

8 June 2008

Libya	2–2	Tunisia

Stade Père Jégo, Casablanca
8 June 2008

Morocco	2–0	Algeria
Biat; Laaroussi

Stade Père Jégo, Casablanca

10 June 2008

Morocco	0–2	Egypt

Stade Père Jégo, Casablanca
10 June 2008

Tunisia	2–1	Algeria
Sassi

Stade Père Jégo, Casablanca

12 June 2008

Algeria	0–0	Egypt

Stade Père Jégo, Casablanca
12 June 2008

Libya	1–3	Morocco

Stade Père Jégo, Casablanca

14 June 2008

Egypt	0–0	Tunisia

Stade Père Jégo, Casablanca
14 June 2008

Algeria	0–0	Libya

Stade Père Jégo, Casablanca

== Champion ==
2008 UNAF U-20 Tournament winners

Egypt
Second title
