= 2006 UNAF U-20 Tournament =

Tournament details
- Country: Egypt
- Dates: 5–14 June
- Teams: 5

Final positions
- Champions: Egypt (1st title)
- Runners-up: Morocco
- Third place: Tunisia

Tournament statistics
- Matches played: 10

The 2006 UNAF U-20 Tournament was the 2nd edition of the UNAF U-20 Tournament. The tournament took place in Egypt, from 5 to 14 June 2006. Egypt won the tournament for the first time.

== Participants ==
- Algeria
- Egypt (hosts)
- Libya
- Morocco
- Tunisia

== Tournament ==
Team	Pld	W	D	L	GF	GA	GD	Pts
Egypt	4	2	2	0				8
Morocco	4	2	2	0				8
Tunisia	4	1	3	0				6
Algeria	4	1	1	2	1	3	-2	4
Libya	4	0	0	4	2	7	-5	0

== Champion ==
2006 UNAF U-20 Tournament winners

Egypt
First title
