= Mahmoud Labib =

Egyptian footballer (born 2005)

Mahmoud Labib Hemida (Arabic: محمود لبيب; born 1 January 2005) is an Egyptian professional footballer who plays as a left-back for Egyptian Premier League club Al Ahly and the Egypt U20.

== Honors and achievements ==
Al Ahly

- Egyptian Premier League: 2023–24
