= Zaid Betteka =

Algerian footballer (born 2007)

Personal information
- Date of birth: 2 July 2007 (age 19)
- Place of birth: Birmingham, England
- Height: 1.80 m (5 ft 11 in)
- Position: Winger

Team information
- Current team: Spalding United

Youth career
- 2017–2018: Calthorpe
- 2018–2025: Birmingham City

Senior career*
Years	Team	Apps	(Gls)
2025–2026	Birmingham City	0	(0)
2026–	Spalding United	0	(0)
- * Club domestic league appearances and goals as of 11:00, 22 August 2026 (UTC)

Zaid Betteka (Arabic: زايد بتقة; born 2 July 2007) is an English professional footballer who plays as a winger for National League North club Spalding United.

== Career ==
Betteka began playing grassroots football with Calthorpe, before joining the youth academy of Birmingham City as a U11. He made his senior and professional debut with Birmingham City as a substitute in a 2–1 FA Cup win over Lincoln City on 11 January 2025. On 16 May 2025, he signed his first professional contract with Birmingham until 2027.

On 21 August 2026, Betteka joined National League North club Spalding United.

== International career ==
Betteka was born in England to an Algerian father and a Somali mother. On 29 May 2025, he was called up to the Algeria U20s for a set of friendlies.
