= Morocco national under-20 football team =

National under-20 association football team representing Morocco

Morocco U-20
- Nickname: The Atlas Cubs
- Association: Royal Moroccan Football Federation
- Confederation: CAF (Africa)
- Home stadium: Various
- FIFA code: MAR
First colours	Second colours

FIFA U-20 World Cup
- Appearances: 4 (first in 1977)
- Best result: (gold) Champions (2025)

U-20 Africa Cup of Nations
- Appearances: 11 (first in 1979)
- Best result: Champions (1997)

Arab Cup U-20
- Appearances: 8 (first in 1983)
- Best result: (gold) Champions (1989, 2011)
Medal record
FIFA U-20 World Cup
Gold medal – first place	2025 Chile	Team
U-20 Africa Cup of Nations
Gold medal – first place	1997 Morocco
Silver medal – second place	2025 Egypt	Team
Arab Cup U-20
Gold medal – first place	1989 Iraq
Gold medal – first place	2011 Morocco
Silver medal – second place	1983 Morocco
Mediterranean Games
Gold medal – first place	2013 Mersin
Bronze medal – third place	2026 Taranto
Bronze medal – third place	2022 Oran
Islamic Solidarity Games
Gold medal – first place	2013 Palembang
Bronze medal – third place	2005 Mecca

Morocco national under-20 football team, represents Morocco in association football at an under-20 age level and is controlled by the Royal Moroccan Football Federation, the governing body for football in Morocco. The current coach is Ludovic Batelli.

== History ==
On 24 December 2020, Morocco won the 2020 UNAF U-20 Tournament and qualified for the 2021 U-20 Africa Cup of Nations. In the 2021 U-20 Africa Cup of Nations, Morocco topped their group stage after winning 1-0 against Gambia, drawing 0-0 with Ghana, and defeating Tanzania 2-0. Their campaign ended after losing to Tunisia on penalties in the quarterfinals.

In the 2025 U-20 Africa Cup of Nations, Morocco again finished first in their group. They started by beating Kenya 3-2 in an exciting match. Then, they played a tough game against Nigeria that ended in a 0-0 draw. In their last group match, they won 3-1 against Tunisia. These results helped them move on to the knockout stage as the top team in their group. In the quarterfinal, Morocco beat Sierra Leone 1-0 in extra time. In the semifinal, they defeated Egypt 1-0 to reach the final. In the final, Morocco lost 1-0 to first time champions South Africa.

In the 2025 FIFA U-20 World Cup, Morocco advanced to the knockout stages after finishing first in their group. They defeated Spain 2-0 and Brazil 2-1, but lost to Mexico 1-0. In the Round of 16 they beat South Korea 2-1. In the quarterfinals they defeated the USA 3-1.In the semifinal on 15 October 2025, they beat France on penalties, securing a place in the World Cup final for the first time in their history. On 20 October 2025, Morocco defeated Argentina 2–0 in the final, claiming their first-ever world title, the first for the Arab World and the second for Africa, after Ghana's triumph in 2009.

On 22 October 2025, Crown Prince Moulay Hassan hosted the national team at the royal palace to honor their World Cup victory.

At the 2025 CAF Awards, the Morocco under-20 national team was named the Best National Team of the Year, becoming the first non-senior national side to receive the honour.

== Players ==
=== Current squad ===
The following players were named in the squad for the 2025 FIFA U-20 World Cup between 27 September – 19 October 2025.

Caps and goals are correct as of 1 October 2025, after the match against Brazil.

No.	Pos.	Player	Date of birth (age)	Caps	Goals	Club
1	GK	Yanis Benchaouch	10 April 2006 (age 20)	18	0	(French Football Federation) Monaco
12	GK	Ibrahim Gomis	20 March 2005 (age 21)	2	0	(French Football Federation) Marseille
16	GK	Hakim Mesbahi	7 September 2005 (age 21)	18	0	(Royal Moroccan Football Federation) AS FAR
2	DF	Hamza Koutoune	17 September 2006 (age 20)	15	0	(French Football Federation) Annecy
3	DF	Ali Maamar	23 March 2005 (age 21)	24	0	(Royal Belgian Football Association) Anderlecht
4	DF	Ismaël Baouf	17 September 2006 (age 20)	12	1	(Royal Dutch Football Association) Cambuur
13	DF	Taha Majni	11 October 2007 (age 19)	4	0	(Royal Moroccan Football Federation) Union Touarga
15	DF	Fouad Zahouani	18 April 2006 (age 20)	16	0	(Royal Moroccan Football Federation) Union Touarga
19	DF	Smail Bakhty	29 November 2006 (age 19)	14	2	(Austrian Football Association) Sturm Graz
20	DF	Mohammed Kebdani	13 May 2006 (age 20)	1	0	(Royal Moroccan Football Federation) AS FAR
5	MF	Anas Tajaouart	7 September 2005 (age 21)	12	1	(Royal Belgian Football Association) Anderlecht
6	MF	Naïm Byar	23 February 2005 (age 21)	11	1	(Royal Moroccan Football Federation) Wydad AC
8	MF	Hossam Essadak	30 July 2005 (age 21)	20	1	(Royal Moroccan Football Federation) Union de Touarga
10	MF	Saad El Haddad	24 July 2005 (age 21)	19	7	(Italian Football Federation) Pineto
18	MF	Yassine Khalifi	9 August 2005 (age 21)	28	3	(Royal Belgian Football Association) Sporting Charleroi
7	FW	Othmane Maamma	6 October 2005 (age 21)	23	5	(The Football Association) Watford
9	FW	Younes El Bahraoui	4 January 2005 (age 21)	4	1	(Royal Moroccan Football Federation) KAC Marrakech
11	FW	Ilias Boumassaoudi	14 January 2005 (age 21)	19	5	(Royal Dutch Football Association) Den Bosch
14	FW	Mohamed Hamony	5 August 2006 (age 20)	3	0	(Royal Spanish Football Federation) Girona B
17	FW	Gessime Yassine	22 November 2005 (age 20)	11	3	(French Football Federation) Strasbourg
21	FW	Yassir Zabiri	23 February 2005 (age 21)	25	16	(French Football Federation) Rennes

=== Recent call-ups ===
The following players have been called up for the Morocco U-20 squad in the last 12 months and remain eligible.

Pos.	Player	Date of birth (age)	Caps	Goals	Club	Latest call-up

== Previous squads ==
FIFA World Youth Championship squads

- 1977 FIFA WYC
- 1997 FIFA WYC
- 2005 FIFA WYC

Africa U-20 Cup of Nations squads

- 2005 AYC squad
- 2021 CAN U-20 squad

== FIFA U-20 World Cup ==
FIFA U-20 World Cup
Year	Result	GP	W	D	L	GS	GA
(Tunisia) 1977	Group stage	3	0	0	3	0	6
(Japan) 1979	Did not qualify						
(Australia) 1981	Did not qualify						
(Mexico) 1983	Did not qualify						
(Soviet Union) 1985	Did not qualify						
(Chile) 1987	Did not qualify						
(Saudi Arabia) 1989	Did not qualify						
(Portugal) 1991	Did not qualify						
(Australia) 1993	Did not qualify						
(Qatar) 1995	Did not qualify						
(Malaysia) 1997	Round of 16	4	1	2	1	5	4
(Nigeria) 1999	Did not qualify						
(Argentina) 2001	Did not qualify						
(United Arab Emirates) 2003	Did not qualify						
(Netherlands) 2005	Fourth place	7	3	1	3	11	10
(Canada) 2007	Did not qualify						
(Egypt) 2009	Did not qualify						
(Colombia) 2011	Did not qualify						
(Turkey) 2013	Did not qualify						
(New Zealand) 2015	Did not qualify						
(South Korea) 2017	Did not qualify						
(Poland) 2019	Did not qualify						
(Argentina) 2023	Did not qualify						
(Chile) 2025	Champions	7	5	1	1	12	5
(Azerbaijan) (Uzbekistan) 2027	To be determined						
(Armenia) (Georgia (country)) 2029	To be determined						
Total	4/26	21	9	4	8	28	25

== U-20 Africa Cup of Nations ==
U-20 Africa Cup of Nations
Year	Result	GP	W	D	L	GS	GA
1979	Second round	2	0	1	1	0	2
1981	First round	2	1	0	1	1	1
1983	Quarterfinals	4	2	1	1	7	3
1985	Quarterfinals	4	2	1	1	4	3
1987	Semifinals	6	4	0	2	10	4
1989	First Round	2	1	0	1	2	2
(Egypt) 1991	Did not qualify						
(Mauritius) 1993	Group stage	3	1	0	2	4	6
(Nigeria) 1995	Did not qualify						
(Morocco) 1997	Winner	5	3	1	1	5	2
(Ghana) 1999	Did not qualify						
(Ethiopia) 2001	Did not qualify						
(Burkina Faso) 2003	Group stage	3	0	1	2	0	5
(Benin) 2005	Fourth Place	5	2	3	0	8	5
(Republic of the Congo) 2007	Did not qualify						
(Rwanda) 2009	Did not qualify						
(South Africa) 2011	Did not qualify						
(Algeria) 2013	Did not qualify						
(Senegal) 2015	Did not qualify						
(Zambia) 2017	Did not qualify						
(Niger) 2019	Did not qualify						
(Mauritania) 2021	Quarterfinals	4	2	2	0	4	0
(Egypt) 2023	Did not qualify						
(Egypt) 2025	Runners-up	6	4	1	1	13	8
(Ghana) 2027	To be determined						
Total	12/23	46	22	11	13	58	41

== Tournament Records ==
=== UNAF U-20 Tournament record ===
UNAF U-20 Tournament
Appearances: 15 / 18
Year	Round	Position	Pld	W	D	L	GF	GA
(Tunisia) 2005	did not participate							
(Egypt) 2006	Runners-up	2	4	2	2	0	?	?
(Libya) 2007	Fourth Place	4	3	1	0	2	2	4
(Morocco) 2008	Fourth Place	4	4	2	0	2	5	4
(Libya) 2009	Third Place	3	3	2	0	1	3	3
(Libya) 2010	Fourth Place	4	3	0	2	1	2	4
(Libya) 2011	Fourth Place	4	3	0	1	2	0	4
(Algeria) Mar 2012	Third Place	3	2	1	0	1	3	3
(Algeria) Dec 2012	Third Place	3	3	1	1	1	4	4
(Libya) 2014	Runner-up	2	2	1	0	1	3	3
(Tunisia) 2015	Winner	1	2	2	0	0	5	2
(Tunisia) 2019	Fourth Place	4	4	1	2	1	3	4
(Tunisia) 2020	Winner	1	3	1	2	0	2	1
(Tunisia) 2021	withdrew							
(Egypt) 2022	Third Place	3	1	1	1	2	1	4
(Tunisia) 2023	Runner-up	2	4	2	1	2	12	7
(Egypt) 2024	Winner	1	4	3	1	0	9	3
(Egypt) 2026	Runner-up	2	4	2	1	2	7	4
Total	w	3	51	22	14	15	60?	51?

=== Arab Cup U-20 record ===
Arab Cup U-20
Appearances: 8 / 8
Year	Round	Position	Pld	W	D	L	GF	GA
(Morocco) 1983	Third Place	3rd	7	5	1	1	9	3
(Algeria) 1985	Group stage	11th	2	0	1	1	0	2
(Iraq) 1989	Champions	1st	6	5	1	0	14	4
(Sudan) 1992	Cancelled							
(Morocco) 2011	Champions	1st	5	3	2	0	6	3
(Jordan) 2012	Group stage	6th	3	1	1	1	3	3
(Qatar) 2014	Cancelled							
(Saudi Arabia) 2020	Semi-finals	4th	5	4	0	1	12	7
(Egypt) 2021	Quarter-finals	5th	4	3	1	0	16	2
(Saudi Arabia) 2022	Quarter-finals	6th	3	2	0	1	6	4
(Iraq) 2026	To be determined							
(Egypt) 2028	To be determined							
Total	Best: Champions	2nd	35	23	7	5	66	28

=== Mediterranean Games ===
Year	Round	Position	GP	W	D*	L	GS	GA
(Greece) 1991	Bronze Medal	3rd	3	2	0	1	6	3
(France) 1993	Group stage	9th	2	0	1	1	0	2
(Italy) 1997	did not enter							
(Tunisia) 2001	Group stage	8th	2	1	0	1	6	4
(Spain) 2005	Fourth Place	4th	5	1	2	2	3	3
(Italy) 2009	withdrew							
(Turkey) 2013	Gold Medal	1st	5	4	1	0	12	5
(Spain) 2018	Bronze Medal	3rd	4	1	2	1	5	5
(Algeria) 2022	Bronze Medal	3rd	5	2	1	2	8	6
(Italy) 2026	Bronze Medal	3rd	5	2	2	1	12	6
(Kosovo) 2030	To be determined							
Total	1 Title	8/10	30	13	9	9	52	34

=== Jeux de la Francophonie ===
Football at the Jeux de la Francophonie record
Year	Round	Position	Pld	W	D	L	GF	GA
(Morocco) 1989	Silver Medal	2nd	5	3	1	1	10	7
(France) 1994	Fourth Place	4th	4	2	0	2	5	6
(Madagascar) 1997	did not enter							
(Canada) 2001	Gold Medal	1st	6	3	3	0	12	3
(Niger) 2005	Group Stage	9th	3	1	0	2	4	4
(Lebanon) 2009	Bronze Medal	3rd	4	3	0	1	6	3
(France) 2013	Silver Medal	2nd	4	1	1	2	4	4
(Ivory Coast) 2017	Gold Medal	1st	5	3	2	0	13	1
(Democratic Republic of the Congo) 2023	did not enter							
(Armenia) 2027	To be determined							
Total	2 Titles	7/9	31	16	7	8	54	28

== Head-to-head record ==
The following table shows Morocco's head-to-head record in the FIFA U-20 World Cup.

Opponent	Pld	W	D	L	GF	GA	GD	Win %
Argentina	1	1	0	0	2	0	+2	100.00
Belgium	1	0	1	0	1	1	+0	0.00
Brazil	2	1	0	1	3	3	+0	50.00
Chile	1	1	0	0	1	0	+1	100.00
France	1	0	1	0	1	1	+0	0.00
Honduras	2	1	0	1	5	1	+4	50.00
Hungary	1	0	0	1	0	2	−2	0.00
Italy	1	0	1	0	2	2	+0	0.00
Japan	1	1	0	0	1	0	+1	100.00
Malaysia	1	1	0	0	3	1	+2	100.00
Mexico	1	0	0	1	0	1	−1	0.00
Nigeria	1	0	0	1	0	3	−3	0.00
Republic of Ireland	1	0	0	1	1	2	−1	0.00
South Korea	1	1	0	0	2	1	+1	100.00
Spain	2	1	0	1	3	3	+0	50.00
United States	1	1	0	0	3	1	+2	100.00
Uruguay	2	0	1	1	0	3	−3	0.00
Total	21	9	4	8	28	25	+3	42.86

== Honours ==
=== International ===
- FIFA U-20 World Cup:

(gold) Champions: 2025

=== Continental ===
- U-20 Africa Cup of Nations:

(gold) Champions: 1997
(silver) Runners-up: 2025
(bronze) Third Place: 1987

=== Regional ===
- Arab Cup U-20:

(gold) Champions (2): 1989, 2011
(bronze) Third Place: 1983

- Mediterranean Games:

(gold) Gold Medalists: 2013
(bronze) Bronze Medal: 2022
(bronze) Bronze Medal: 2026

- Islamic Solidarity Games

(gold) Gold Medalists (1): 2013

- Jeux de la Francophonie

(gold) Gold Medalists (2): 2001, 2017
(silver) Silver Medal: 1989, 2013
(bronze) Bronze Medal: 2009

=== Qualifying tournament ===
- UNAF U-20 Tournament:

(gold) Champions (3): 2015, 2020, 2024
(silver) Runners-up: 2006, 2014, 2023, 2026
(bronze) Third Place: 2008, 2009, 2012, 2022
