= 2012 UNAF U-20 Tournament (December) =

Tournament details
- Country: Algeria
- Dates: 8–13 December 2012
- Teams: 6

Final positions
- Champions: Egypt (2nd title)
- Runners-up: Algeria
- Third place: Morocco

Tournament statistics
- Matches played: 7
- Goals scored: 19 (2.71 per match)
- Top goal scorer(s): (Algeria) Bilel Ouali (Egypt) Mahmoud Abdel-Munaim; 3 goals

The 2012 UNAF U-20 Tournament (December) is the 9th edition of the UNAF U-20 Tournament and the 2nd edition on 2012. The tournament took place in Blida and Zéralda (Algiers), from 8 to 13 December.

== Participants ==
- Algeria A & B (hosts)
- Egypt
- Morocco
- Niger (invited)
- Tunisia

Algeria B replaced Benin which withdrew a few days before starting competition.

== Group stage ==
=== Group A ===
Team	Pld	W	D	L	GF	GA	GD	Pts
Algeria A	2	1	0	1	4	2	+2	3
Morocco	2	1	0	1	3	3	0	3
Tunisia	2	1	0	1	2	4	−2	3

7 December 2012
15:15

Algeria A	1–2	Morocco
Saïghi 90'		20' Bahdja; 70' El Wardi

Stade Frères Brakni, Blida
9 December 2012
14:30

Algeria A	3–0	Tunisia
Ouali 16', 32', 55'

Stade Frères Brakni, Blida
11 December 2012
14:30

Tunisia	2–1	Morocco
Louati 28'; Cherni 50'		79' Saidi

Stade Frères Brakni, Blida

=== Group B ===
Team	Pld	W	D	L	GF	GA	GD	Pts
Egypt	2	2	0	0	5	1	+4	6
Algeria B	2	1	0	1	3	4	−1	3
Niger	2	0	0	2	0	3	−3	0

7 December 2012
15:15

Egypt	1–0	Niger
Saleh Gomaa 58'

Stade Zéralda, Zéralda
9 December 2012
14:30

Egypt	4–1	Algeria B
Ahmed Samir 17'; Kahraba 61', 67', 90'		80' Bousbaci

Stade Zéralda, Zéralda
11 December 2012
14:30

Algeria B	2–0	Niger
Cherifi 51'; Benkablia 64'

Stade Zéralda, Zéralda

== Knockout stage ==
Normally the final oppose the winners of the two groups, Algeria A and Egypt, however the match was canceled because the two teams are rivals in the next 2013 African U-20 Championship. A new poster was therefore put in place which will see Algeria A face Morocco, as part of a classification game to determine which team will take over second place. Egypt, for its part, is declared the winner of the tournament with his two victories.

=== Second place match ===
13 December 2012

Algeria A	1–1	Morocco
Haddouche 73' (pen.)		85' Bennouna

Stade Frères Brakni, Blida

Algeria A finished second with his first place in group A of the group stage.

=== Final ===
Egypt
declared the winner of the tournament.

== Champion ==
2012 UNAF U-20 Tournament winners

Egypt
second title

== Scorers ==
3 goals

- (Algeria) Bilal Ouali
- (Egypt) Kahraba
