= 2009 UNAF U-20 Tournament =

Tournament details
- Country: Libya
- Dates: 5–9 August
- Teams: 4

Final positions
- Champions: Tunisia (3rd title)
- Runners-up: Algeria
- Third place: Morocco

Tournament statistics
- Matches played: 6
- Goals scored: 11 (1.83 per match)
- Top goal scorer(s): (Tunisia) Yassine Khenissi (3 goals)

Awards
- Best player: (Morocco) Khalil Mahboub

The 2009 UNAF U-20 Tournament was the 5th edition of the UNAF U-20 Tournament. The tournament took place in Libya, from 5 to 9 August 2009. Tunisia won the tournament for the third time.

== Participants ==
- Algeria
- Libya (hosts)
- Tunisia
- Morocco

== Venues ==
Cities	Venues	Capacity
Benina, Benghazi	Hugo Chávez Stadium	10,550

== Tournament ==
Team	Pld	W	D	L	GF	GA	GD	Pts
Tunisia	3	2	0	1	4	1	+3	6
Algeria	3	2	0	1	4	2	+2	6
Morocco	3	2	0	1	3	3	0	6
Libya	3	0	0	3	0	5	-5	0

=== Matches ===
5 August 2009
13:00

Algeria	3–1	Morocco
Bendahmane 2'; Bezzaz 73'; Baleh 77'		Bendahmane 65' (o.g.)

Hugo Chávez Stadium, Benina
5 August 2009
15:00

Libya	0–3	Tunisia
		Khenissi ?', ?'; Ferchichi ?'

Hugo Chávez Stadium, Benina

7 August 2009
13:00

Tunisia	1–0	Algeria
Khenissi 74' (pen.)

Hugo Chávez Stadium, Benina
7 August 2009
15:00

Libya	0–1	Morocco
		Mahboub 57'

Hugo Chávez Stadium, Benina

9 August 2009
13:00

Libya	0–1	Algeria
Khalfallah 85'

Hugo Chávez Stadium, Benina
9 August 2009
15:00

Morocco	1–0	Tunisia
Zahraoui ?'

Hugo Chávez Stadium, Benina

== Champion ==
2009 UNAF U-20 Tournament winners

Tunisia
Third title
