= 2007 UNAF U-20 Tournament =

Tournament details
- Country: Libya
- Dates: 25–30 December
- Teams: 4

Final positions
- Champions: Tunisia (2nd title)
- Runners-up: Algeria
- Third place: Libya

Tournament statistics
- Matches played: 6
- Goals scored: 13 (2.17 per match)

The 2007 UNAF U-20 Tournament was the 3rd edition of the UNAF U-20 Tournament. The tournament took place in Libya, from 25 to 30 December 2007. Tunisia wins the tournament for the second time.

== Participants ==
- Algeria
- Libya (hosts)
- Morocco
- Tunisia

== Tournament ==
Team	Pld	W	D	L	GF	GA	GD	Pts
Tunisia	3	2	0	1	4	3	+1	6
Algeria	3	1	1	1	5	4	+1	4
Libya	3	1	1	1	2	2	0	4
Morocco	3	1	0	2	2	4	-2	3

=== Matches ===
25 December 2007

Algeria	3–0	Morocco

Tripoli
25 December 2007

Libya	0–1	Tunisia

Tripoli

27 December 2007

Libya	1–1	Algeria
Penalties
	2–4

Tripoli
27 December 2007

Tunisia	0–2	Morocco

Tripoli

30 December 2007

Libya	1–0	Morocco

Tripoli
30 December 2007

Tunisia	3–1	Algeria

Tripoli

== Champion ==
2007 UNAF U-20 Tournament winners

Tunisia
Second title
