= Tunisia national under-20 football team =

National under-20 association football team representing Tunisia

Tunisia U-20
- Nickname(s): نسور قرطاج (Eagles of Carthage)
- Association: Tunisian Football Federation
- Other affiliation: UAFA (Arab World)
- Confederation: CAF (Africa)
- Sub-confederation: UNAF (North Africa)
- Home stadium: Hammadi Agrebi Stadium
- FIFA code: TUN
First colours	Second colours	Third colours

First international
- Tunisia 0–6 Mexico (Tunis, Tunisia; 27 June 1977)

Biggest win
- Tunisia 5–0 Libya (Tunis, Tunisia; 20 July 2002)

Biggest defeat
- Tunisia 0–6 Mexico (Tunis, Tunisia; 27 June 1977)

FIFA U-20 World Cup
- Appearances: 3 (first in 1977)
- Best result: Round of 16 (2023)

U-20 Africa Cup of Nations
- Appearances: 9 (first in 1979)
- Best result: Runners-up (1985)

Arab Cup U-20
- Appearances: 7 (first in 2012)
- Best result: Champions (2012)

UNAF U-20 Tournament
- Appearances: 16 (first in 2005)
- Best result: Champions (2005, 2007, 2009, Mar 2012, 2019, 2020, 2021, 2022, 2023)

The Tunisia national under-20 football team has represented Tunisia in men's international association football for players aged 20 or under. The team is administered by the Tunisian Football Federation (TFF), which governs football in Tunisia. On a continental level, the team competes under the Confederation of African Football (CAF), which governs associate football in Africa, and is also affiliated with FIFA for global competitions. Additionally, the team is a member of the Union of North African Football (UNAF) and the Union of Arab Football Associations (UAFA). The team is colloquially known as Eagles of Carthage by fans and the media, with the bald eagle serving as its symbol. Their home kit is primarily white and their away kit is red, which is a reference to the national flag of the country.

The Tunisian national team qualified for the FIFA U-20 World Cup three times: the inaugural edition in 1977 as hosts, 1985 and 2023, reaching the round of 16 in the last participation. The team qualified nine times for the U-20 Africa Cup of Nations, finishing second in 1985 after losing the final to Nigeria. The team did not qualify for the tournament for 32 years, returning to the 2021 and 2023 editions, achieving fourth place in both. The team participated seven times in the Arab Cup U-20, winning the title in their fourth appearance in 2012 after defeating Saudi Arabia in the final, Tunisia also reached the 2020 final but lost to Senegal, who were invited to the tournament. Tunisia has participated in the Mediterranean Games with the under-20 category seven times, winning the gold medal in 2001 as host after defeating Italy in the final, the silver medal in 2026 and the bronze medal in 2013. Tunisia U-20 team is the most successful teams in UNAF, the team participated seventeen times in the UNAF U-20 Tournament, having won the title nine times in 2005, 2007, 2009, Mar 2012, 2019, 2020, 2021, 2022 and 2023 as a record, it has also finished second three times and third place twice.

== Competitive records ==
Champions Runners-up Third place Fourth place

- Red border color indicates tournament was held on home soil.

=== FIFA U-20 World Cup ===
FIFA U-20 World Cup record
Year	Round	Position	Pld	W	D*	L	GF	GA
(Tunisia) 1977	Group stage	14th	3	1	0	2	1	7
(Japan) 1979	Did not qualify							
(Australia) 1981	Did not qualify							
(Mexico) 1983	Did not qualify							
(Soviet Union) 1985	Group stage	16th	3	0	0	3	2	6
(Chile) 1987	Did not qualify							
(Saudi Arabia) 1989	Did not qualify							
(Portugal) 1991	Did not qualify							
(Australia) 1993	Did not qualify							
(Qatar) 1995	Did not qualify							
(Malaysia) 1997	Did not qualify							
(Nigeria) 1999	Did not qualify							
(Argentina) 2001	Did not qualify							
(United Arab Emirates) 2003	Did not qualify							
(Netherlands) 2005	Did not qualify							
(Canada) 2007	Did not qualify							
(Egypt) 2009	Did not qualify							
(Colombia) 2011	Did not qualify							
(Turkey) 2013	Did not qualify							
(New Zealand) 2015	Did not qualify							
(South Korea) 2017	Did not qualify							
(Poland) 2019	Did not qualify							
(Indonesia) ~~2021~~	Cancelled due to the COVID-19 pandemic							
(Argentina) 2023	Round of 16	15th	4	1	0	3	4	6
(Chile) 2025	Did not qualify							
(Azerbaijan) (Uzbekistan) 2027	Did not qualify							
(Armenia) (Georgia (country)) 2029	To be determined							
Total	Round of 16	3/26	10	2	0	8	7	19

=== U-20 Africa Cup of Nations ===
U-20 Africa Cup of Nations record
Year	Round	Position	Pld	W	D*	L	GF	GA
1979	Second round	–	4	2	1	1	4	2
1981	Second round	–	4	2	0	2	5	6
1983	First round	–	2	0	1	1	0	4
1985	Runner-up	2nd	8	1	5	2	5	5
1987	Quarter-finals	–	4	1	3	0	3	2
1989	First round	–	2	0	2	0	2	2
(Egypt) 1991	Withdrew after qualification							
(Mauritius) 1993	Did not qualify							
(Nigeria) 1995	Did not qualify							
(Morocco) 1997	Did not qualify							
(Ghana) 1999	Did not qualify							
(Ethiopia) 2001	Did not qualify							
(Burkina Faso) 2003	Did not qualify							
(Benin) 2005	Did not qualify							
(Republic of the Congo) 2007	Did not qualify							
(Rwanda) 2009	Did not qualify							
(South Africa) 2011	Did not qualify							
(Algeria) 2013	Did not qualify							
(Senegal) 2015	Did not qualify							
(Zambia) 2017	Did not qualify							
(Niger) 2019	Did not qualify							
(Mauritania) 2021	Fourth Place	4th	6	1	3	2	4	6
(Egypt) 2023	Fourth Place	4th	6	1	2	3	5	12
(Egypt) 2025	Group stage	9th	3	1	0	2	4	5
(Ghana) 2027	Did not qualify							
Total	Runners-up	9/23	39	9	17	13	32	44

=== Arab Cup U-20 ===
Arab Cup U-20 record
Year	Round	Position	Pld	W	D*	L	GF	GA
(Morocco) 1983	Round 2	8th	5	1	3	3	3	6
(Algeria) 1985	Fourth Place	4th	7	3	0	4	6	10
(Iraq) 1989	Quarter-finals	–	3	1	0	2	3	5
(Morocco) 2011	Did not enter							
(Jordan) 2012	Champions	1st	5	4	1	0	14	9
(Qatar) 2014	Cancelled							
(Saudi Arabia) 2020	Runners-up	2nd	6	4	1	1	10	3
(Egypt) 2021	Semi-finals	4th	5	4	0	1	6	3
(Saudi Arabia) 2022	Quarter-finals	5th	3	2	0	1	9	1
Total	1 Title	7/8	34	19	5	12	51	37

=== Mediterranean Games ===
Mediterranean Games record
Year	Round	Position	Pld	W	D*	L	GF	GA
1951–1987	See Tunisia national football team							
(Greece) 1991	Group stage	7th	2	1	0	1	1	5
(France) 1993	Group stage	7th	3	1	0	2	2	5
(Italy) 1997	Did not enter							
(Tunisia) 2001	Champions	1st	4	3	0	1	7	1
(Spain) 2005	Quarter-finals	7th	3	0	3	0	4	4
(Italy) 2009	Group stage	7th	4	2	1	1	6	5
(Turkey) 2013	Third Place	3rd	5	3	1	1	10	5
2018–2022	See Tunisia national under-18 football team							
(Italy) 2026	Runner-up	2nd	5	3	1	1	6	4
(Kosovo) 2030	To be determined							
Total	1 Title	7/12	26	13	6	7	36	29

=== UNAF U-20 Tournament ===
UNAF U-20 Tournament record
Year	Round	Position	Pld	W	D*	L	GF	GA
(Tunisia) 2005	Champions	1st	3	3	0	0	4	1
(Egypt) 2006	Third Place	3rd	4	1	3	0	?	?
(Libya) 2007	Champions	1st	3	2	0	1	4	3
(Morocco) 2008	Runner-up	2nd	4	2	2	0	5	3
(Libya) 2009	Champions	1st	3	2	0	1	4	1
(Libya) 2010	Runner-up	2nd	3	0	2	1	4	5
(Libya) 2011	Did not participate							
(Algeria) Mar 2012	Champions	1st	2	1	1	0	3	2
(Algeria) Dec 2012	Fifth Place	5th	2	1	0	1	2	4
(Libya) 2014	Fourth Place	4th	2	0	0	2	1	3
(Tunisia) 2015	Runner-up	2nd	2	1	0	1	3	2
(Tunisia) 2019	Champions	1st	4	2	1	1	5	4
(Tunisia) 2020	Champions	1st	3	1	2	0	2	1
(Tunisia) 2021	Champions	1st	4	3	1	0	11	4
(Egypt) 2022	Champions	1st	3	1	2	0	5	4
(Tunisia) 2023	Champions	1st	4	4	0	0	15	6
(Egypt) 2024	Third Place	3rd	4	2	0	2	5	5
(Egypt) 2026	Fifth Place	5th	4	0	3	1	3	4
Total	9 Titles	16/17	54	26	17	11	–	–

=== African Games ===
African Games record
Year	Round	Position	Pld	W	D*	L	GF	GA
1965–1987	See Tunisia national football team							
1991–2015	See Tunisia national under-23 football team							
(Morocco) 2019	Did not qualify							
(Ghana) 2023	Withdrew after qualification							
(Egypt) 2027	To be determined							
Total	–	0/2	–	–	–	–	–	–

== Honours ==
- U-20 Africa Cup of Nations

(silver) Runners-up (1): 1985

- Arab Cup U-20

(gold) Champions (1): 2012
(silver) Runners-up (1): 2020

- UNAF U-20 Tournament

(gold) Champions (9): 2005, 2007, 2009, Mar 2012, 2019, 2020, 2021, 2022, 2023
(silver) Runners-up (3): 2008, 2010, 2015
(bronze) Third Place (2): 2006, 2024

- Mediterranean Games

(gold) Champions (1): 2001
(silver) Runners-up (1): 2026
(bronze) Third Place (1): 2013

== See also ==
- Tunisia national football team
- Tunisia A' national football team
- Tunisia national under-23 football team
- Tunisia national under-18 football team
- Tunisia national under-17 football team
- Tunisia national under-15 football team
