= 2005 UNAF U-20 Tournament =

Tournament details
- Country: Tunisia
- Dates: 16–22 December
- Teams: 4

Final positions
- Champions: Tunisia (1st title)
- Runners-up: Egypt
- Third place: Algeria

Tournament statistics
- Matches played: 6
- Goals scored: 12 (2 per match)

The 2005 UNAF U-20 Tournament was the 1st edition of the UNAF U-20 Tournament. The tournament took place in Tunisia, from 16 to 22 December 2005. Tunisia wins this first tournament.

== Participants ==
- Algeria
- Egypt
- Libya
- Tunisia (hosts)

== Tournament ==
Team	Pld	W	D	L	GF	GA	GD	Pts
Tunisia	3	3	0	0	4	1	+3	9
Egypt	3	1	1	1	3	1	+2	4
Algeria	3	0	2	1	3	4	-1	2
Libya	3	0	1	2	2	6	-4	1

=== Matches ===
16 December 2005

Tunisia	1–0	Libya

Zarzis
16 December 2005

Algeria	0–0	Egypt

Zarzis

19 December 2005

Tunisia	1–0	Egypt

Gabès
19 December 2005

Algeria	2–2	Libya

Ben Gardane

22 December 2005

Libya	0–3	Egypt

Stade de Midoun, Djerba
22 December 2005

Tunisia	2–1	Algeria

Stade de Midoun, Djerba

== Champion ==
2005 UNAF U-20 Tournament winners

Tunisia
First title
