= Mohamed Awad =

Mohamed or Mohammed Awad may refer to:

- Mohamed Awad (Egyptian footballer) (born 1992)
- Mohamed Awad (Somali footballer) (born 1994)
- Mohammed Awad (politician) (died 2007), assassinated Iraqi politician
- Mohammed Awad (squash player) (born 1949), Egyptian squash player
- Mohammed Awad (Ethiopian footballer), see 1962 FIFA World Cup qualification – UEFA Group 7
- Mohammed Awad (Palestinian politician), head of the Hamas government 2019–2021
- Mohammad Awad, Jordanian football player
- Mohammed Awaed, Israeli footballer
- Mohamed Ahmed Mohamoud, a Somali politician
