= 2022 UNAF U-20 Tournament =

Tournament details
- Country: Egypt
- Dates: 18–24 October 2022
- Teams: 4

Final positions
- Champions: Tunisia (8th title)
- Runners-up: Libya
- Third place: Morocco

Tournament statistics
- Matches played: 6
- Goals scored: 14 (2.33 per match)
- Top goal scorer(s): (Algeria) Abdelali Hamadi (Tunisia) Mohamed H. Jertila (2 goals each)

The 2022 UNAF U-20 Tournament was the 15th edition of the UNAF U-20 Tournament. The tournament took place in Egypt, from 18 to 24 October 2022. The tournament also served as the qualifiers for the 2023 Africa U-20 Cup of Nations.

== Participants ==
Egypt qualified as a hosts of the 2023 Africa U-20 Cup of Nations and did not take part to the tournament. The 4 participating teams were:

- Algeria
- Libya
- Morocco
- Tunisia

== Venues ==
Cities	Venues	Capacity
Suez	Suez Stadium	27,000
Suez	Egyptian Army Stadium	45,000

== Tournament ==
Pos	Team	Pld	W	D	L	GF	GA	GD	Pts	Qualification
1	Tunisia	3	1	2	0	5	4	+1	5	2023 Africa U-20 Cup of Nations
2	Libya	3	1	1	1	2	2	0	4 (Note: Head-to-head result: Morocco 0–1 Libya.)	
3	Morocco	3	1	1	1	2	1	+1	4	
4	Algeria	3	0	2	1	5	7	−2	2	

Source: UNAF
Rules for classification: 1) Points; 2) Goal difference; 3) Goals scored

=== Matches ===
18 October 2022
15:00

Morocco	0–0	Tunisia
	Report

Suez Stadium, Suez
Referee: Omar Artan (Somalia)
18 October 2022
18:00

Libya	1–1	Algeria
Bouchiba 61'	Report	Dehilis 90+4'

Suez Stadium, Suez
Referee: Naim Hosni (Tunisia)

21 October 2022
15:00

Algeria	0–2	Morocco
	Report	Lantaki 37'; Sadik 90+6'

Suez Stadium, Suez
Referee: Mahmoud El Banna (Egypt)
21 October 2022
18:00

Tunisia	1–0	Libya
Jertila 78'	Report

Suez Stadium, Suez
Referee: Jalal Jayed (Morocco)

24 October 2022
15:00

Algeria	4–4	Tunisia
Aitamer 34'; Hamadi 80', 90+3'; Boulbina 82'	Report	Derbali 19'; Abid 26'; Snana 36'; Jertila 67'

Suez Stadium, Suez
Referee: Omar Artan (Somalia)
24 October 2022
15:00

Morocco	0–1	Libya
	Report	Al Hbishi 81'

Egyptian Army Stadium, Suez
Referee: Youcef Gamouh (Algeria)

== Champion ==
2022 UNAF U-20 Tournament winners

Tunisia
Eighth title

== Statistics ==
=== Goalscorers ===
There were 14 goals scored in 6 matches, for an average of 2.33 goals per match.

2 goals

- (Algeria) Abdelali Hamadi
- (Tunisia) Mohamed Hedi Jertila

1 goal

- (Algeria) Younes Aitamer
- (Algeria) Adil Boulbina
- (Algeria) Rayan Dehilis
- (Libya) Marwan Al Hbishi
- (Libya) Abdelmayser Boushiba
- (Morocco) Wassim Lantaki
- (Morocco) Omar Sadik
- (Tunisia) Aziz Abid
- (Tunisia) Mohamed Derbali
- (Tunisia) Youssef Snana
