= 2012 UNAF U-20 Tournament (March) =

Tournament details
- Country: Algeria
- Dates: March 27 - March 30
- Teams: 4

Final positions
- Champions: Tunisia (4th title)
- Runners-up: Mauritania
- Third place: Morocco

Tournament statistics
- Matches played: 4
- Goals scored: 9 (2.25 per match)

The 2012 UNAF U-20 Tournament (March) was the 8th edition of the UNAF U-20 Tournament. The tournament took place in Dar El Beïda, Algiers, from 27 to 30 March 2012. Tunisia won the competition after topping the group stage.

== Participants ==
- Algeria
- Tunisia
- Morocco
- Mauritania (invited)

== Tournament ==
Team	Pld	W	D	L	GF	GA	GD	Pts
Tunisia	2	1	1	0	3	2	+1	4
Mauritania	2	1	1	0	2	1	+1	4
Morocco	2	1	0	1	3	3	0	3
Algeria	2	0	0	2	1	3	-2	0

=== Matches ===
March 27, 2012

Tunisia	2 – 1	Morocco
Bounouas 12'; Idriss Mhirsi 88'	Report	Omar Ati Allah 51'

Stade Dar El Beïda, Algiers

March 27, 2012

Algeria	0 – 1	Mauritania
	Report	Lounis Hamar 72' (o.g.)

Stade Dar El Beïda, Algiers
Referee: Mohamed Ben Hassana (Tunisia)

March 30, 2012

Tunisia	1 – 1	Mauritania
Seif Jaziri 8'	Report	Niaff Abdulaye 80'
Penalties
	5 – 4

Stade Dar El Beïda, Algiers

March 30, 2012

Algeria	1 – 2	Morocco
Zinedine Ferhat 27' (pen.)	Report	Youssef Essaidi 30' (pen.), 35'

Stade Dar El Beïda, Algiers
Referee: Mohamed Ben Hassana (Tunisia)

== Champions ==
2012 UNAF U-20 Tournament winners

Tunisia
Fourth title

== Scorers ==
2 goals

- (Morocco) Youssef Essaidi

1 goal

- (Algeria) Zinedine Ferhat
- (Mauritania) Niaff Abdulaye
- (Morocco) Omar Atiallah
- (Tunisia) Idriss Mhirsi
- (Tunisia) Bounouas
- (Tunisia) Seif Jaziri

Own goal

- (Algeria) Lounis Hamar
