= 2014 UNAF U-20 Tournament =

Tournament details
- Country: Libya
- Dates: 18 - 21 March
- Teams: 4

Final positions
- Champions: Senegal (1st title)
- Runners-up: Morocco
- Third place: Libya

Tournament statistics
- Matches played: 4
- Goals scored: 8 (2 per match)

The 2014 UNAF U-20 Tournament was the 10th edition of the UNAF U-20 Tournament. The tournament took place in Misurata, Libya, from March 18 to 21, 2014. Senegal won the competition after topping the group stage.

== Participants ==
- Libya (hosts)
- Morocco
- Tunisia
- Senegal (invited)

== Tournament ==
Team	Pld	W	D	L	GF	GA	GD	Pts
Senegal	2	2	0	0	2	0	+2	6
Morocco	2	1	0	1	3	3	0	3
Libya	2	1	0	1	2	2	0	3
Tunisia	2	0	0	2	1	3	-2	0

=== Matches ===
March 18, 2014

Libya	0 – 1	Senegal

Misurata
March 19, 2014

Tunisia	1 – 2	Morocco

Misurata

March 21, 2014

Senegal	1 – 0	Tunisia

Misurata
March 21, 2014

Libya	2 – 1	Morocco

Misurata

== Champions ==
2015 UNAF U-20 Tournament winners

Senegal
First title
