= 2011 UNAF U-20 Tournament =

Tournament details
- Country: Libya
- Dates: 6–10 February
- Teams: 4

Final positions
- Champions: Libya (1st title)
- Runners-up: Algeria
- Third place: Kenya

Tournament statistics
- Matches played: 6
- Goals scored: 12 (2 per match)

The 2011 UNAF U-20 Tournament was the 7th edition of the UNAF U-20 Tournament. The tournament took place in Libya, from 6 to 10 February 2011. Libya won the tournament for the first time.

== Participants ==
- Algeria
- Kenya (invited)
- Libya (hosts)
- Morocco

== Tournament ==
| Team | Pld | W | D | L | GF | GA | GD | Pts |
|---|---|---|---|---|---|---|---|---|
| Libya | 3 | 2 | 1 | 0 | 6 | 1 | +5 | 7 |
| Algeria | 3 | 2 | 0 | 1 | 3 | 1 | +2 | 6 |
| Kenya | 3 | 1 | 0 | 2 | 2 | 6 | -4 | 3 |
| Morocco | 3 | 0 | 1 | 2 | 0 | 4 | -4 | 1 |

=== Matches ===
5 February 2011
14:00

| Algeria | 2–0 | Morocco |

Tripoli
5 February 2011
17:00

| Libya | 5–1 | Kenya |

Tripoli

8 February 2011
14:00

| Algeria | 1–0 | Kenya |
|---|---|---|
| Mekki 85' |

Tripoli
8 February 2011
17:00

| Libya | 0–0 | Morocco |

Tripoli

10 February 2011
14:00

| Morocco | 0–2 | Kenya |

Tripoli
10 February 2011
17:00

| Libya | 1–0 | Algeria |

Tripoli

== Champion ==
2011 UNAF U-20 Tournament winners

Libya
First title
