= 2010 UNAF U-20 Tournament =

Tournament details
- Host country: Algeria
- Teams: 4

Final positions
- Champions: Mali
- Runners-up: Tunisia

Tournament statistics
- Matches played: 6
- Goals scored: 14 (2.33 per match)
- Top scorer: Amara Malle
- Best player: Ayman Trabelsi

The 2010 UNAF U-20 Tournament was the 6th edition of the UNAF U-20 Tournament. The tournament took place in Algeria, from 27 March to 2 April 2010 . All games took place in Algiers.

== Participants ==
The participants were:

- Algeria
- Mali
- Morocco
- Tunisia

== Results ==
March 27, 2010

Mali	2 - 0	Morocco
Amara Malle 44'; Moustapha Tounkara 70'	Report

Stade Zéralda, Algiers
March 27, 2010

Algeria	1 - 1	Tunisia
Ahmed Cheheima 12'	Report	Aymen Derouiche 25'

Stade Zéralda, Algiers
March 30, 2010

Mali	1 - 0	Tunisia
Goal

Stade Zéralda, Algiers
March 30, 2010

Algeria	0 - 0	Morocco

Stade Zéralda, Algiers
April 2, 2010

Tunisia	2 - 2	Morocco
Tahar Khennichi 29'; Mohamed Ali Manser 90+4' (pen.)	Report	Sofiane Talal 46' (pen.); Mehdi Khellafi 57'

Stade Zéralda, Algiers
April 2, 2010

Algeria	1 - 2	Mali
Ahmed Cheheima 70'	Report	Konté 56'; Amara Malle

Stade Zéralda, Algiers

== Final table ==
Team	Points	Won	Drew	Lost	Goals For	Goals Against	Points
Mali	3	3	0	0	5	1	9
Tunisia	3	0	2	1	4	5	2
Algeria	3	0	2	1	1	2	2
Morocco	3	0	2	1	2	4	2

== Awards ==
- Golden ball: (Tunisia) Ayman Trabelsi
- Golden boot: (Mali) Amara Malle
- Golden glove: (Morocco) Yassine Bounou
- Fair play trophy: Algeria
