= 1981 African Youth Championship =

3rd African youth football qualification tournament

Tournament details
- Dates: 8 June 1980 – 24 April 1981
- Teams: 14 (from 1 confederation)

Final positions
- Champions: Egypt (1st title)
- Runners-up: Cameroon
- Third place: Nigeria
- Fourth place: Algeria

Tournament statistics
- Matches played: 10
- Goals scored: 49 (4.9 per match)

The 1981 African Youth Championship was the 3rd edition of the biennial African qualification tournament for the FIFA World Youth Championship which was contested on a home-and-away two-legged basis.

Egypt beat Cameroon 3–1 on aggregate in the final to claim their inaugural title, although both teams qualified for the 1981 FIFA World Youth Championship in Australia.

== Teams ==
The following teams entered this edition of the tournament and played at least a match:

- Algeria
- Central African Republic
- Cameroon
- Egypt
- Equatorial Guinea
- Ethiopia
- Gabon
- Guinea
- Mauritania
- Morocco
- Nigeria
- Togo
- Tunisia
- Zimbabwe

== Preliminary round ==
The first leg was played on 8 June and the second leg was held on 22 June 1980. The winners advanced to the first round.

The teams who received byes to the first round are Guinea, Cameroon, Tunisia, Morocco, Ethiopia, Mauritania, Algeria, Nigeria, Ivory Coast, Egypt, Uganda, the Central African Republic and Kenya.

Team 1	Agg.	Team 2	1st leg	2nd leg
Equatorial Guinea	4–3	Gabon	2–0	2–3
Togo	w/o ^{1}	Benin		
Zimbabwe	w/o ^{1}	Malawi		

^{1} Malawi and Benin withdrew.

== First round ==
Team 1	Agg.	Team 2	1st leg	2nd leg
Guinea	2–2 (a)	Equatorial Guinea	2–1	0–1
Cameroon	5–1	Togo	3–0	2–1
Tunisia	1–1 (6–5 pen.)	Morocco	0–1	1–0 (a.e.t.)
Zimbabwe	2–1	Ethiopia	0–0	2–1
Mauritania	1–6	Algeria	1–3	0–3
Nigeria	w/o ^{1}	Ivory Coast		
Egypt	w/o ^{1}	Uganda		
Central African Republic	w/o ^{1}	Kenya		

^{1} Ivory Coast, Uganda and Kenya withdrew.

== Second round ==
Team 1	Agg.	Team 2	1st leg	2nd leg
Cameroon	3–1	Equatorial Guinea	3–0	0–1
Nigeria	5–4	Tunisia	4–0	1–4
Zimbabwe	1–3	Egypt	1–1	0–2
Central African Republic	w/o ^{1}	Algeria	4–1	n/p

^{1} Civil unrest and political turmoil in the Central African Republic forced their team to withdraw after the first leg: the second leg was scratched and Algeria advanced to the semi-finals.

== Semi-finals ==
Team 1	Agg.	Team 2	1st leg	2nd leg
Nigeria	2–4	Cameroon	2–3	0–1
Algeria	w/o^{1}	Egypt		

^{1} Algeria withdrew.

== Final ==
The first leg was played on 12 April and the second leg on 24 April 1981.

Team 1	Agg.	Team 2	1st leg	2nd leg
Cameroon	1–3	Egypt	1–1	0–2

1981 African Youth Championship winners

Egypt
First/Inaugural title

== Qualification to the World Youth Championship ==
The two best performing teams qualified for the 1981 FIFA World Youth Championship.

- Cameroon
- Egypt
