= 2015 UNAF U-20 Tournament =

Tournament details
- Country: Tunisia
- Dates: 9-14 June
- Teams: 3

Final positions
- Champions: Morocco (1st title)
- Runners-up: Tunisia
- Third place: Burkina Faso

Tournament statistics
- Matches played: 3
- Goals scored: 9 (3 per match)

The 2015 UNAF U-20 Tournament was the 11th edition of the UNAF U-20 Tournament. The tournament took place in Tunisia, from 9 to 14 June 2015.

== Participants ==
- Tunisia (hosts)
- Morocco
- Burkina Faso (invited)

== Tournament ==
Team	Pld	W	D	L	GF	GA	GD	Pts
Morocco	2	2	0	0	5	2	+3	6
Tunisia	2	1	0	1	3	2	+1	3
Burkina Faso	2	0	0	2	1	5	-4	0

=== Matches ===
June 9, 2015

Tunisia	2 – 0	Burkina Faso

Tunisia
June 11, 2015

Morocco	3 – 1	Burkina Faso

Tunisia
June 14, 2015

Tunisia	1 – 2	Morocco

Tunisia

== Champions ==
2015 UNAF U-20 Tournament winners

Morocco
First title
