= 1979 African Youth Championship =

2nd African youth football qualification tournament

Tournament details
- Dates: 6 August 1978 – 25 February 1979
- Teams: 11 (from 1 confederation)

Final positions
- Champions: Algeria (1st title)
- Runners-up: Guinea
- Third place: Nigeria
- Fourth place: Ethiopia

Tournament statistics
- Matches played: 10
- Goals scored: 24 (2.4 per match)

The 1979 African Youth Championship was the second edition of the biennial qualification tournament for the FIFA World Youth Championship for African nations and the inaugural edition under the African Youth Championship title.

Algeria and Guinea qualified for the 1979 FIFA World Youth Championship in Japan by reaching the final, although the former won their inaugural title via the away goals rule against the latter with the match ending 4–4 on aggregate.

== Teams ==
The following teams entered this edition of the tournament and played at least a match:

- Algeria
- Cameroon
- Egypt
- Ethiopia
- Guinea
- Kenya
- Libya
- Mauritius
- Morocco
- Nigeria
- Tunisia

== Preliminary round ==
After Malawi, Madagascar and Senegal all withdrew, the preliminary round was scratched and Kenya, Mauritius and the Gambia advanced to the first round.

== First round ==
Uganda, Mali, Togo, Ivory Coast and Gambia withdrew, leading Mauritius, Morocco, Guinea, Cameroon and Nigeria to advance to the second round.

Team 1	Agg.	Team 2	1st leg	2nd leg
Libya	2–3	Algeria	1–2	1–1
Egypt	0–3	Tunisia	0–1	0–2
Kenya	2–4	Ethiopia	2–0	0–4

== Second round ==
Team 1	Agg.	Team 2	1st leg	2nd leg
Tunisia	1–2	Algeria	1–2	0–0
Mauritius	1–2	Ethiopia	1–1	0–1
Guinea	2–0	Morocco	2–0	0–0
Nigeria	3–1	Cameroon	1–1	2–0

== Semi-finals ==
Team 1	Agg.	Team 2	1st leg	2nd leg
Ethiopia	0–1	Algeria	0–0	0–1
Nigeria	1–2	Guinea	0–1	1–1

== Final ==
Team 1	Agg.	Team 2	1st leg	2nd leg
Algeria	4–4 (Note: Algeria won on away goals.)	Guinea	2–1	2–3

== Winners ==
1979 African Youth Championship winners

Algeria
First/Inaugural title

== Qualification to the World Youth Championship ==
The two best performing teams qualified for the 1979 FIFA World Youth Championship.

- Algeria
- Guinea
