= 1987 African Youth Championship =

6th African youth football qualification tournament

Tournament details
- Dates: 14 June 1986 – 18 April 1987
- Teams: 15 (from 1 confederation)

Final positions
- Champions: Nigeria (3rd title)
- Runners-up: Togo

Tournament statistics
- Matches played: 26
- Goals scored: 67 (2.58 per match)

The 1987 African Youth Championship was the 6th edition of the biennial African qualification tournament for the FIFA World Youth Championship which was contested on a home-and-away two-legged basis.

Nigeria successfully defended the title for the second consecutive time by defeating Togo 5–1 in their 3rd straight final, although both teams qualified for the 1987 FIFA World Youth Championship in Chile.

== Teams ==
The following teams entered this edition of the tournament and played at least a match:

- Cameroon
- Ivory Coast
- Egypt
- Ethiopia
- Ghana
- Guinea
- Mauritania
- Morocco
- Nigeria
- Somalia
- Togo
- Tunisia
- Uganda
- Zambia
- Zimbabwe

== Preliminary round ==
Swaziland, Lesotho, Sudan, Gabon, Gambia and Mauritania withdrew from this edition of the tournament, leaving their respective opponents Mauritius, Mozambique, Egypt, Ghana, Togo and Algeria to advance to the First Round.

| Team 1 | Agg. | Team 2 | 1st leg | 2nd leg |
|---|---|---|---|---|
| Uganda | 1–3 | Somalia | 1–2 | 0–1 |
| Angola | 1–3 | Zambia | 1–1 | 0–2^{1} |

^{1} Angola were ejected from the competition for fielding over-aged players in the first leg.

== First round ==
| Team 1 | Agg. | Team 2 | 1st leg | 2nd leg |
|---|---|---|---|---|
| Somalia | 1–4 ^{1} | Zimbabwe | 1–0 | 0–4 |
| Egypt | 6–0 | Ethiopia | 4–0 | 2–0 ^{2} |
| Zambia | 2–3 | Nigeria | 2–2 | 0–1 |
| Guinea | 1–2 | Tunisia | 0–1 | 1–1 |
| Togo | 1–3 ^{3} | Ghana | 0–2 | 1–1 |
| Mauritania | 0–6 | Morocco | 0–2 | 0–4 |
| Cameroon | 2–3 | Ivory Coast | 2–0 | 0–3 |
| Mauritius | w/o ^{4} | Mozambique | | |

- ^{1} Zimbabwe were ejected from the competition for using ineligible players.
- ^{2} Ethiopia withdrew after the first leg.
- ^{3} Ghana were ejected from the competition for using ineligible players.
- ^{4} Mauritius withdrew.

== Quarter-finals ==
Mozambique withdrew, leaving its opponent, Somalia, to advance to the semi-finals.

| Team 1 | Agg. | Team 2 | 1st leg | 2nd leg |
|---|---|---|---|---|
| Nigeria | 5–2 | Egypt | 4–0 | 1–2 |
| Tunisia | 1–1(a) | Togo | 1–1 | 0–0 |
| Ivory Coast | 2–3 | Morocco | 2–0 | 0–3 |

== Semi-finals ==
| Team 1 | Agg. | Team 2 | 1st leg | 2nd leg |
|---|---|---|---|---|
| Nigeria | 2–0 | Somalia | 1–0 | 1–0 |
| Morocco | 1–2 | Togo | 1–0 | 0–2 |

== Final ==
| Team 1 | Agg. | Team 2 | 1st leg | 2nd leg |
|---|---|---|---|---|
| Togo | 1–5 | Nigeria | 1–2 | 0–3 |

1987 African Youth Championship

Nigeria
3rd title

== Qualification for the World Youth Championship ==
These two best performing teams qualified for the 1987 FIFA World Youth Championship in Chile:

- Nigeria
- Togo
