= 1985 African Youth Championship =

5th African youth football qualification tournament

Tournament details
- Dates: 2 September 1984 – 4 May 1985
- Teams: 17 (from 1 confederation)

Final positions
- Champions: Nigeria (2nd title)
- Runners-up: Tunisia

Tournament statistics
- Matches played: 26
- Goals scored: 59 (2.27 per match)

The 1985 African Youth Championship was the 5th edition of the biennial African qualification tournament for the FIFA World Youth Championship which was contested on a home-and-away two-legged basis.

Nigeria reached the final for the first time in consecutive editions of the tournament and successfully defended the title for the second time and beat Tunisia 3–2 on aggregate, although both teams qualified for the 1985 FIFA World Youth Championship in the Soviet Union.

== Teams ==
The following teams entered this edition of the tournament and played at least a match:

Preliminary Round:

- Angola
- Equatorial Guinea
- Gambia
- Ghana
- Mozambique
- Sudan
- Uganda
- Zambia

First Round:

- Algeria
- Cameroon
- Egypt
- Ethiopia
- Guinea
- Morocco
- Nigeria
- Tunisia
- Zimbabwe

Second Round:

- Ivory Coast

== Preliminary round ==
Burkina Faso, Libya and Togo withdrew, leaving Benin, Ethiopia and Senegal to advance to the First Round. The teams that received byes to the next round were Algeria, Cameroon, Egypt, Ethiopia, Guinea, Ivory Coast, Morocco, Nigeria, Tunisia and Zimbabwe.

Team 1	Agg.	Team 2	1st leg	2nd leg
Gambia	2–3	Ghana	1–0	1–3
Equatorial Guinea	2–2	Angola	2–1	0–1
Sudan	1–0	Uganda	1–0	0–0
Mozambique	0–8	Zambia	0–3	0–5

== First round ==
Benin and Senegal withdrew, leaving Guinea and Ivory Coast to advance to the second round.

Team 1	Agg.	Team 2	1st leg	2nd leg
Tunisia	0–0 (3–2 pen.)	Algeria	0–0	0–0
Morocco	3–1	Egypt	2–0	1–1
Nigeria	2–1	Ghana	2–0	0–1
Cameroon	5–0	Angola	3–0	2–0
Zimbabwe	4–3	Sudan	4–2	0–1
Ethiopia	5–3	Zambia	2–2	3–1

== Quarter-finals ==
Ivory Coast entered this edition of the tournament at this round.

Team 1	Agg.	Team 2	1st leg	2nd leg
Guinea	1–3	Ivory Coast	0–0	1–3
Morocco	1–2	Tunisia	1–0	0–2
Cameroon	4–5	Nigeria	3–0	1–5
Ethiopia	3–1	Zimbabwe	1–1	2–0

== Semi-finals ==
Team 1	Agg.	Team 2	1st leg	2nd leg
Ivory Coast	1–1 (a)	Tunisia	1–1	0–0
Nigeria	4–1	Ethiopia	3–0	1–1

== Final ==
Team 1	Agg.	Team 2	1st leg	2nd leg
Tunisia	2–3	Nigeria	1–1	1–2

1985 African Youth Championship

Nigeria
2nd title

== Qualification for the World Youth Championship ==
These two best performing teams qualified for the 1985 FIFA World Youth Championship in the Soviet Union:

- Nigeria
- Tunisia
