= 1989 African Youth Championship =

7th African youth football qualification tournament

Tournament details
- Dates: 30 April 1988 – 14 January 1989
- Teams: 16 (from 1 confederation)

Final positions
- Champions: Nigeria (4th title)
- Runners-up: Mali

Tournament statistics
- Matches played: 30
- Goals scored: 82 (2.73 per match)

The 1989 African Youth Championship was the 7th edition of the biennial African qualification tournament for the FIFA World Youth Championship, contested on a home and away two-legged basis.

Nigeria reached the final and defended their title for the third consecutive time and the fourth time overall by defeating Mali 4–1 on aggregate, although both teams qualified for the 1989 FIFA World Youth Championship in Saudi Arabia.

== Teams ==
The following teams entered this edition of the tournament and played at least a match:

Preliminary Round:

- Angola
- Guinea
- Liberia
- Mali
- Senegal
- Zaire

First round:

- Algeria
- Cameroon
- Ivory Coast
- Egypt
- Gabon
- Ghana
- Lesotho
- Morocco
- Nigeria
- Tunisia

== Preliminary round ==
Central Africa, Mauritania, Mauritius and Kenya withdrew, leaving their respective opponents Gabon, Algeria, Madagascar and Lesotho to advance to the first round.

Team 1	Agg.	Team 2	1st leg	2nd leg
Mali	6–4	Senegal	4–0	2–4
Guinea	4–2	Liberia	3–1	1–1
Angola	3–4	Zaire	2–1	1–3

== First round ==
Madagascar, Somalia and Togo withdrew, leaving their respective opponents Egypt, Ivory Coast and Lesotho to advance to the second round.

Team 1	Agg.	Team 2	1st leg	2nd leg
Mali	2–2 (a)	Morocco	1–0	1–2
Algeria	2–2 (a)	Tunisia	0–0	2–2
Guinea	3–3 (a)	Ghana	3–2	0–1
Zaire	2–2 (a)	Nigeria	2–2	0–0
Gabon	2–1	Cameroon	2–0	0–1

== Quarter-finals ==
Team 1	Agg.	Team 2	1st leg	2nd leg
Mali	3–3 (a)	Egypt	2–0	1–3
Ghana	3–3 (4–5 pen.)	Algeria	3–0	0–3
Nigeria	6–1	Lesotho	4–0	2–1
Gabon	2–4	Ivory Coast	1–0	1–4

== Semi-finals ==
Team 1	Agg.	Team 2	1st leg	2nd leg
Algeria	1–1 (a)	Mali	1–1	0–0
Ivory Coast	2–4	Nigeria	2–2	0–2

== Final ==
The final was played over two legs; on 1 January in Bamako and on the 14th in Ibadan.

Team 1	Agg.	Team 2	1st leg	2nd leg
Mali	1–4	Nigeria	1–2	0–2

Second leg match details:

14 January 1989

Nigeria	2–0	Mali
45' Mutiu Adepoju; 75' Jimoh Balogun

Ibadan

1989 African Youth Championship

Nigeria
4th title

== Qualification for the World Youth Championship ==
These two best performing teams qualified for the 1989 FIFA World Youth Championship in Saudi Arabia:

- Mali
- Nigeria
