= UNAF U-20 Tournament =

- Organiser(s): UNAF
- Founded: 2005; 21 years ago
- Region: North Africa
- Teams: 5 (plus guests)
- Current champions: Egypt (4th title)
- Most championships: Tunisia (9 titles)
- Website: unafonline.org
- 2026 UNAF U-20 Tournament

The UNAF U-20 Tournament is the annual international youth football tournament organized by the Union of North African Football (UNAF) for its nations consisting of players under the age of 20. However, the tournament invites teams from other nations.

Egypt are the tournament's current champions after winning the 2026 tournament, while Tunisia are the most successful nation winning the tournament nine times.

== Results ==
Ed.	Year	Host	First place game			Third place game		
Ed.	Year	Host	(gold) Champion	Score	(silver) Runner-up	(bronze) Third place	Score	Fourth place
1	2005	Tunisia	Tunisia	round-robin	Egypt	Algeria	round-robin	Libya
2	2006	Egypt	Egypt	round-robin	Morocco	Tunisia	round-robin	Algeria
3	2007	Libya	Tunisia	round-robin	Algeria	Libya	round-robin	Morocco
4	2008	Morocco	Egypt	round-robin	Tunisia	Morocco	round-robin	Libya
5	2009	Libya	Tunisia	round-robin	Algeria	Morocco	round-robin	Libya
6	2010	Algeria	Mali	round-robin	Tunisia	Algeria	round-robin	Morocco
7	2011	Libya	Libya	round-robin	Algeria	Kenya	round-robin	Morocco
8	Mar 2012	Algeria	Tunisia	round-robin	Mauritania	Morocco	round-robin	Algeria
9	Dec 2012	Algeria	Egypt	round-robin	Algeria A	Morocco	round-robin	Algeria B
10	2014	Libya	Senegal	round-robin	Morocco	Libya	round-robin	Tunisia
11	2015	Tunisia	Morocco	round-robin	Tunisia	Burkina Faso		
12	2019	Tunisia	Tunisia	round-robin	Egypt	Algeria	round-robin	Morocco
13	2020	Tunisia	Tunisia / Morocco; Title shared			Libya	round-robin	Algeria
14	2021	Tunisia	Tunisia	round-robin	Egypt	Mauritania	round-robin	Algeria
15	2022	Egypt	Tunisia	round-robin	Libya	Morocco	round-robin	Algeria
16	2023	Tunisia	Tunisia	round-robin	Morocco	Egypt	round-robin	Libya
17	2024	Egypt	Morocco	round-robin	Egypt	Tunisia	round-robin	Algeria
18	2026	Egypt	Egypt	round-robin	Morocco	Algeria	round-robin	Libya

== Statistics ==
=== Summary ===
Team	Winners	Runners-up	Third place	Fourth place
Tunisia	9 (2005*, 2007, 2009, Mar 2012, 2019*, 2020*^{s}, 2021*, 2022, 2023*)	3 (2008, 2010, 2015*)	2 (2006, 2024)	1 (2014)
Egypt	4 (2006*, 2008, Dec 2012, 2026*)	4 (2005, 2019, 2021, 2024*)	1 (2023)	—
Morocco	3 (2015, 2020^{s}, 2024)	4 (2006, 2014, 2023, 2026)	5 (2008*, 2009, Mar 2012, Dec 2012, 2022)	4 (2007, 2010, 2011, 2019)
Libya	1 (2011*)	1 (2022)	3 (2007*, 2014*, 2020)	5 (2005, 2008, 2009*, 2023, 2026)
Mali	1 (2010)	—	—	—
Senegal	1 (2014)	—	—	—
Algeria	—	4 (2007, 2009, 2011, Dec 2012*)	4 (2005, 2010*, 2019, 2026)	6 (2006, Mar 2012*, 2020, 2021, 2022, 2024)
Mauritania	-—	1 (Mar 2012)	1 (2021)	—
Kenya	—	—	1 (2011)	—
Burkina Faso	—	—	1 (2015)	—

* Hosts
^{s} Shared title
Italic Invited nation

=== Participating nations ===
Team	(Tunisia) 2005	(Egypt) 2006	(Libya) 2007	(Morocco) 2008	(Libya) 2009	(Algeria) 2010	(Libya) 2011	(Algeria) Mar 2012	(Algeria) Dec 2012	(Libya) 2014	(Tunisia) 2015	(Tunisia) 2019	(Tunisia) 2020	(Tunisia) 2021	(Egypt) 2022	(Tunisia) 2023	(Egypt) 2024	(Egypt) 2026	Apps.
Algeria	3rd	4th	2nd	5th	2nd	3rd	2nd	4th	2nd	×	×	3rd	4th	4th	4th	5th	4th	3rd	16
Egypt	2nd	1st	×	1st	×	×	×	×	1st	×	×	2nd	×	2nd	×	3rd	2nd	1st	9
Libya	4th	5th	3rd	4th	4th	×	1st	×	×	3rd	×	×	3rd	5th	2nd	4th	5th	4th	13
Morocco	×	2nd	4th	4th	3rd	4th	4th	3rd	3rd	2nd	1st	4th	1st	×	3rd	2nd	1st	2nd	16
Tunisia	1st	3rd	1st	2nd	1st	2nd	×	1st	5th	4th	2nd	1st	1st	1st	1st	1st	3rd	5th	17
Invited nations
Burkina Faso											3rd	5th							2
Kenya							3rd												1
Mali						1st													1
Mauritania								2nd						3rd					2
Niger									6th										1
Senegal										1st									1

Legend

- 1st – Champions
- 2nd – Runners-up
- 3rd – Third place
- 4th – Fourth place
- 5th – Fifth place
- 6th – Sixth place
- Q – Qualified for upcoming tournament
- × — Did not enter / Withdrew / Disqualified
- — Hosts

== See also ==
- UNAF U-23 Tournament
- UNAF U-18 Tournament
- UNAF U-17 Tournament
- UNAF U-16 Tournament
- UNAF U-15 Tournament
