= 2025 U-20 Africa Cup of Nations squads =

Squads for the 2025 U-20 Africa Cup of Nations

The 2025 U-20 Africa Cup of Nations is an African youth association football tournament currently being held in Egypt. The thirteen national teams involved in this edition of the tournament were required to register a squad of 21 players; only players in these squads were eligible to take part. Each player had to have been born after 1 January 2005.

== Group A ==
=== Egypt ===
The final squad was announced on 17 April 2025.

Head coach: Osama Nabieh

No.	Pos.	Player	Date of birth (age)	Club
1	GK	Abdelmonem Tamer	3 August 2006 (aged 18)	(Egyptian Football Association) ZED
16	GK	Ahmed Wahba	5 May 2005 (aged 19)	(Egyptian Football Association) Al Masry
23	GK	Ahmed Menshawi	18 October 2005 (aged 19)	(Egyptian Football Association) Al Ittihad
2	DF	Mohamed Samir	3 February 2006 (aged 19)	(Egyptian Football Association) ENPPI
3	DF	Mohamed Gamal		(Egyptian Football Association) Petrojet
4	DF	Ahmed Abdin	1 May 2006 (aged 18)	(Egyptian Football Association) Cleopatra
5	DF	Abdallah Bostangy	4 April 2005 (aged 20)	(Egyptian Football Association) Smouha
6	DF	Youssef Abdelhafiz	5 January 2005 (aged 20)	(Egyptian Football Association) Cleopatra
12	DF	Moamen Sherif	11 February 2006 (aged 19)	(Egyptian Football Association) Al Ittihad
13	DF	Mahmoud Labib	7 May 2005 (aged 19)	(Egyptian Football Association) Al Ahly
14	DF	Mohab Samy	20 February 2005 (aged 20)	(Egyptian Football Association) ENPPI
7	MF	Omar Fathy	27 May 2005 (aged 19)	(Egyptian Football Association) Al Ittihad
8	MF	Ahmed Khaled	22 April 2005 (aged 20)	(Egyptian Football Association) Modern Sport
10	MF	Mohamed Abdallah	18 October 2005 (aged 19)	(Egyptian Football Association) Al Ahly
17	MF	Amr Khaled	6 October 2005 (aged 19)	(Swiss Football Association) Wohlen
20	MF	Ahmed Sharaf	4 August 2005 (aged 19)	(Egyptian Football Association) Al Masry
21	MF	Ahmed Wahid	7 July 2005 (aged 19)	(Egyptian Football Association) Al Ahly
22	MF	Mohamed El-Sayed	20 May 2006 (aged 18)	(Egyptian Football Association) Zamalek
24	MF	Mohamed Atef	21 March 2007 (aged 18)	(Egyptian Football Association) Al Ahly
25	MF	Seif Eldin Essam	3 April 2005 (aged 20)	(Egyptian Football Association) ENPPI
26	MF	Omar Osama		(Egyptian Football Association) ENPPI
9	FW	Mohamed Zaalouk	5 March 2005 (aged 20)	(Egyptian Football Association) Al Ahly
11	FW	Mohanad Mohamed		(Egyptian Football Association) Al Mokawloon
15	FW	Omar Khedr	25 May 2006 (aged 18)	(The Football Association) Aston Villa
18	FW	Mohamed Raafat		(Egyptian Football Association) Al Ahly
19	FW	Mohamed Haitham	17 February 2007 (aged 18)	(Egyptian Football Association) Al Ahly

=== Zambia ===
Coach: Boyd Mulwanda

The squad was announced on 20 April 2025.

No.	Pos.	Player	Date of birth (age)	Club
1	GK	Levison Banda	6 March 2005 (aged 20)	(Football Association of Zambia) ZESCO
16	GK	Eric Makungu	21 June 2005 (aged 19)	(Football Association of Zambia) Chirundu Leopards
18	GK	Mapalo Chitundu	16 June 2005 (aged 19)	(Football Association of Zambia) Kansanshi Dynamos
2	DF	Whiteson Banda	23 January 2007 (aged 18)	(Football Association of Zambia) NAPSA
3	DF	Samson Ngulube	1 December 2005 (aged 19)	(Football Association of Zambia) Kafue Celtic
4	DF	Happy Nsiku	1 March 2005 (aged 20)	(Football Association of Zambia) Red Arrows
5	DF	Charles Buyoya	2 January 2005 (aged 20)	(Football Association of Zambia) Kafue Celtic
12	DF	David Hamansenya	24 June 2007 (aged 17)	(Royal Spanish Football Federation) Leganés
14	DF	Milimo Nalumango	3 September 2007 (aged 17)	(German Football Association) Fortuna Düsseldorf
15	DF	Mathews Banda	6 August 2005 (aged 19)	(Football Association of Zambia) Nkana
6	MF	David Simukonda	10 August 2005 (aged 19)	(Football Association of Zambia) ZESCO
7	MF	Pascal Phiri	17 July 2005 (aged 19)	(Football Association of Zambia) ZESCO
8	MF	Elvis Mutale	1 April 2007 (aged 18)	(Football Association of Zambia) Kafue Celtic
10	MF	Perkin Mumba Mwale	23 November 2005 (aged 19)	(Football Association of Zambia) Green Buffaloes
13	MF	Aaron Mbemba	17 June 2006 (aged 18)	(Royal Spanish Football Federation) Cádiz
20	MF	Emmanuel Mutale	12 April 2006 (aged 19)	(Football Association of Zambia) Nkana
21	MF	Frank Chileshe	10 June 2005 (aged 19)	(Georgian Football Federation) Lokomotivi Tbilisi
23	MF	Obvious Mwaliteta	15 May 2006 (aged 18)	(Football Association of Zambia) Aguila
9	FW	Andrew Mulenga	5 November 2005 (aged 19)	(Brazilian Football Confederation) Vitória
11	FW	Joseph Sabobo Banda	17 December 2005 (aged 19)	(Swiss Football Association) Zürich
17	FW	Bonephanseo Phiri	16 June 2005 (aged 19)	(Georgian Football Federation) Lokomotivi Tbilisi
24	FW	Eliya Mandanji	20 November 2007 (aged 17)	(Football Association of Zambia) Kafue Celtic
25	FW	Philimon Chilimina	25 January 2008 (aged 17)	(Football Association of Zambia) Green Buffaloes
26	FW	Danny Bwalya	6 April 2007 (aged 18)	(Football Association of Zambia) Nchanga Rangers

=== Sierra Leone ===
Coach: Mohamed Lamin Kamara

The squad was announced on 22 April 2025.

No.	Pos.	Player	Date of birth (age)	Club
1	GK	Dauda Bangura	16 October 2006 (aged 18)	(Sierra Leone Football Association) East End Lions
16	GK	Mohamed Kargbo		(Sierra Leone Football Association) Old Edwards
23	GK	Mamadou Jalloh	29 November 2006 (aged 18)	(Danish Football Association) Brøndby
3	DF	Saidu Bangura	11 November 2005 (aged 19)	(Sierra Leone Football Association) East End Lions
4	DF	Alpha Turay	26 May 2005 (aged 19)	(Football Association of Serbia) Dubočica
12	DF	Mohamed Koroma		(Sierra Leone Football Association) Wusum Stars
13	DF	Amara Keïta	8 August 2005 (aged 19)	(Sierra Leone Football Association) SLIFA
15	DF	Citta Bah	27 April 2006 (aged 19)	(Sierra Leone Football Association) Star Sport
18	DF	Nathaniel Jalloh	7 September 2005 (aged 19)	(Sierra Leone Football Association) Kallon
25	DF	Abraham Kanu	3 July 2005 (aged 19)	(The Football Association) Reading
2	MF	Alusine Dumbuya	17 December 2005 (aged 19)	(Sierra Leone Football Association) East End Lions
5	MF	Alpha Kabia	22 November 2005 (aged 19)	(United States Soccer Federation) Minnesota United
6	MF	Musa Bangura	22 August 2006 (aged 18)	(Sierra Leone Football Association) East End Lions
8	MF	Sallieu Bah	10 September 2006 (aged 18)	(Sierra Leone Football Association) Wilberforce Strikers
10	MF	Mohamed Kamara	10 January 2005 (aged 20)	(Latvian Football Federation) Metta
14	MF	Momoh Kamara	6 May 2005 (aged 19)	(Latvian Football Federation) Metta
17	MF	Sheku Kallon		(Sierra Leone Football Association) Wilberforce Strikers
19	MF	Santigie Fornah	1 February 2007 (aged 18)	(Sierra Leone Football Association) SLIFA
26	MF	Abubakarr Sheriff	24 May 2005 (aged 19)	(Sierra Leone Football Association) Luawa
7	FW	Mohamed Fofanah	30 August 2005 (aged 19)	(Sierra Leone Football Association) East End Lions
9	FW	Sulaiman Kargbo	23 April 2005 (aged 20)	(Sierra Leone Football Association) East End Lions
11	FW	Abdul Bangura	1 December 2005 (aged 19)	(Latvian Football Federation) Metta
20	FW	Samba Bah	5 May 2006 (aged 18)	(Sierra Leone Football Association) Diamond Stars
21	FW	Samuel Gandi	19 October 2006 (aged 18)	(Sierra Leone Football Association) Old Edwards
22	FW	Kevin Kargbo	30 November 2006 (aged 18)	(Royal Belgian Football Association) Brussels
24	FW	Osman Kamara	6 August 2006 (aged 18)	(The Football Association) Arsenal

=== South Africa ===
Coach: Raymond Mdaka

The squad was announced on 10 April 2025.

No.	Pos.	Player	Date of birth (age)	Club
1	GK	Fletcher Smythe-Lowe	2 February 2007 (aged 18)	(Portuguese Football Federation) Estoril
16	GK	Kgoleng Ratisani	29 April 2006 (aged 18)	(South African Football Association) Sekhukhune
20	GK	Takalani Mazhamba	30 May 2007 (aged 17)	(South African Football Association) Chiefs
2	DF	Sifiso Timba	28 March 2006 (aged 19)	(South African Football Association) Chiefs
3	DF	Neo Rapoo	12 August 2005 (aged 19)	(South African Football Association) SuperSport
5	DF	Asekho Tiwane	5 October 2005 (aged 19)	(South African Football Association) Sundowns
6	DF	Siviwe Nkwali	15 May 2005 (aged 19)	(South African Football Association) Cape Town Spurs
14	DF	Tylon Smith	9 May 2005 (aged 19)	(South African Football Association) Stellenbosch
19	DF	Thato Sibiya	23 June 2006 (aged 18)	(South African Football Association) Sundowns
21	DF	Gopolang Taunyane	30 November 2005 (aged 19)	(South African Football Association) Chiefs
22	DF	Kabelo Nkgwesa		(South African Football Association) Chiefs
4	MF	Patrick Autata	5 January 2005 (aged 20)	(South African Football Association) Cape Town City
7	MF	Shakiel April	1 December 2005 (aged 19)	(South African Football Association) Cape Town City
8	MF	Gomolemo Kekana	7 July 2006 (aged 18)	(South African Football Association) Sundowns
10	MF	Mfundo Vilakazi	19 November 2005 (aged 19)	(South African Football Association) Chiefs
11	MF	Kutlwano Letlhaku	25 March 2006 (aged 19)	(South African Football Association) Sundowns
12	MF	Faiz Abrahams	25 April 2006 (aged 19)	(South African Football Association) Stellenbosch
15	MF	Lazola Maku	10 April 2007 (aged 18)	(South African Football Association) SuperSport
17	MF	Langelihle Phili	21 January 2005 (aged 20)	(South African Football Association) Stellenbosch
9	FW	Jody Ah Shene	1 February 2005 (aged 20)	(South African Football Association) Cape Town City
13	FW	Kgomotso Modiba	14 December 2007 (aged 17)	(South African Football Association) Stars of Africa Academy
18	FW	Thabang Mahlangu	31 July 2005 (aged 19)	(South African Football Association) SuperSport

=== Tanzania ===
Coach: Charles Boniface Mkwasa

No.	Pos.	Player	Date of birth (age)	Club
1	GK	Anthony Remmy	9 December 2005 (aged 19)	(Tanzania Football Federation) Azam
18	GK	Ismail Mpank	21 July 2006 (aged 18)	(Tanzania Football Federation) KMC
23	GK	Khatibu Mwakisiki		(Tanzania Football Federation) Songea United
2	DF	Ashrafu Kibeku	20 December 2006 (aged 18)	(Tanzania Football Federation) Azam
3	DF	Anthony Mligo	8 August 2007 (aged 17)	(Tanzania Football Federation) Namungo
4	DF	Vedastus Masinde	16 June 2006 (aged 18)	(Tanzania Football Federation) TMA
5	DF	Lameck Lawi	12 September 2005 (aged 19)	(Tanzania Football Federation) Coastal Union
6	DF	Wilson Nangu	25 July 2006 (aged 18)	(Tanzania Football Federation) JKT
13	DF	Nickson Mosha	12 June 2005 (aged 19)	(Tanzania Football Federation) KMC
21	DF	Ismail Ally	18 July 2007 (aged 17)	(Tanzania Football Federation) Azam
25	DF	Ibrahim Nindi	13 June 2007 (aged 17)	(Tanzania Football Federation) Mashujaa
8	MF	Ahmed Pipino	27 February 2005 (aged 20)	(Tanzania Football Federation) KMC
10	MF	Sheikhan Khamis	19 August 2005 (aged 19)	(Tanzania Football Federation) Yanga
11	MF	Bakari Msimu	10 December 2007 (aged 17)	(Tanzania Football Federation) Coastal Union
12	MF	Hijjah Lidah	21 March 2005 (aged 20)	(Tanzania Football Federation) Kagera Sugar
14	MF	Said Naushad	27 November 2005 (aged 19)	(Tanzania Football Federation) Kagera Sugar
15	MF	Abdulkarim Kiswanya	24 February 2005 (aged 20)	(Tanzania Football Federation) Azam
19	MF	Abdul Shakur Shakur		(Tanzania Football Federation) Polisi
26	MF	Abdu Mandeke	27 September 2007 (aged 17)	(Nigeria Football Federation) Grassrunners Academy
7	FW	Zidane Sereri	20 November 2005 (aged 19)	(Tanzania Football Federation) Azam
9	FW	Valentino Mashaka	16 May 2005 (aged 19)	(Tanzania Football Federation) Simba
17	FW	Jammy Simba	15 July 2006 (aged 18)	(Tanzania Football Federation) KMC
20	FW	Cyprian Kachwele	15 February 2005 (aged 20)	(Canadian Soccer Association) Vancouver Whitecaps
22	FW	Mishamo Daud		(Tanzania Football Federation) Kengold
24	FW	Maurice Sichone	20 April 2007 (aged 18)	(Football Association of Zambia) Trident

== Group B ==
=== Nigeria ===
Coach: Aliyu Zubairu

The squad was announced on 17 April 2025.

No.	Pos.	Player	Date of birth (age)	Club
1	GK	Ebenezer Harcourt	21 October 2009 (aged 15)	(Nigeria Football Federation) Sporting Lagos
16	GK	Rufai Abubakar	5 January 2008 (aged 17)	(Nigeria Football Federation) Mavlon
23	GK	Ajia Yakub	1 April 2005 (aged 20)	(Football Association of Serbia) Novi Pazar
2	DF	Adamu Maigari		(Nigeria Football Federation) El-Kanemi Warriors
3	DF	Odinaka Okoro	1 January 2007 (aged 18)	(Nigeria Football Federation) Sporting Lagos
5	DF	Chigozie Ihejiofor		(Nigeria Football Federation) Katsina United
6	DF	Daniel Bameyi	4 January 2006 (aged 19)	(Nigeria Football Federation) Bayelsa United
22	DF	Emmanuel Chukwu	7 November 2006 (aged 18)	(German Football Association) Hoffenheim
4	MF	Caleb Ochedikwu	2 September 2005 (aged 19)	(Croatian Football Federation) Uljanik Pula
8	MF	Sulaiman Alabi	5 December 2005 (aged 19)	(Nigeria Football Federation) El-Kanemi Warriors
10	MF	Israel Ayuma	8 August 2005 (aged 19)	(Croatian Football Federation) Istra
14	MF	Simon Cletus	10 February 2008 (aged 17)	(Nigeria Football Federation) Mavlon
15	MF	Auwal Ibrahim	26 January 2006 (aged 19)	(Nigeria Football Federation) Akwa United
17	MF	Shafiu Duguri	20 June 2006 (aged 18)	(Nigeria Football Federation) Wikki Tourists
7	FW	Clinton Jephta	21 October 2006 (aged 18)	(Nigeria Football Federation) Enyimba
9	FW	Kparobo Arierhi	11 January 2007 (aged 18)	(Norwegian Football Federation) Lillestrøm
11	FW	Bidemi Amole	10 November 2008 (aged 16)	(Nigeria Football Federation) Real Sapphire
12	FW	Precious Benjamin	1 October 2006 (aged 18)	(German Football Association) Hoffenheim
13	FW	Divine Oliseh		(Nigeria Football Federation) Forster Academy
18	FW	Mendos Rickson	18 November 2006 (aged 18)	(Nigeria Football Federation) Niger Tornadoes
19	FW	Ezekiel Kpangu	21 April 2006 (aged 19)	(Nigeria Football Federation) Inspire
20	FW	Matthew Kingsley	26 November 2006 (aged 18)	(Nigeria Football Federation) Kings
21	FW	Tahir Maigana	30 June 2008 (aged 16)	(Nigeria Football Federation) Wireless
24	FW	Armiyau Yushau	18 October 2006 (aged 18)	(Nigeria Football Federation) Katsina United

=== Tunisia ===
Coach: Abdelhay Ben Soltane

The squad was announced on 17 April 2025.

No.	Pos.	Player	Date of birth (age)	Club
1	GK	Thomas Zouaghi	11 April 2005 (aged 20)	(Italian Football Federation) Hellas Verona
16	GK	Moatez Hanzouli		(Tunisian Football Federation) CA Bizertin
22	GK	Rayen Besbes	4 August 2005 (aged 19)	(Tunisian Football Federation) US Monastir
2	DF	Rayan Jerbi	29 April 2006 (aged 18)	(French Football Federation) Nice
3	DF	Rayane Rhimi	31 December 2005 (aged 19)	(Tunisian Football Federation) CA Bizertin
4	DF	Alaeddine Derbali	19 May 2005 (aged 19)	(Tunisian Football Federation) Espérance de Tunis
5	DF	Mohamed Allela	16 February 2005 (aged 20)	(Tunisian Football Federation) CA Bizertin
15	DF	Mohamed Bouzaabia	9 March 2005 (aged 20)	(Tunisian Football Federation) Étoile du Sahel
20	DF	Wassim Abrougi	25 March 2007 (aged 18)	(French Football Federation) Lyon
25	DF	Anis Doubal	29 October 2006 (aged 18)	(French Football Federation) Marseille
26	DF	Rayan Boukadida	23 January 2007 (aged 18)	(French Football Federation) Saint-Étienne
6	MF	Hamza Abidi		(Tunisian Football Federation) Club Africain
8	MF	Amenallah Meherzi	24 October 2005 (aged 19)	(Qatar Football Association) Al Bidda
12	MF	Elyes Dhaoui	15 April 2008 (aged 17)	(Tunisian Football Federation) Olympique Béja
13	MF	Wajdi Issaoui	8 January 2005 (aged 20)	(Tunisian Football Federation) Espérance de Tunis
14	MF	Moncef Gharbi	4 May 2006 (aged 18)	(Tunisian Football Federation) Stade Tunisien
17	MF	Rayane Anane	15 August 2006 (aged 18)	(Tunisian Football Federation) Étoile du Sahel
23	MF	Anes Kordi	28 March 2006 (aged 19)	(German Football Association) Hannover 96
24	MF	Wael Debbiche	9 June 2005 (aged 19)	(French Football Federation) Annecy
7	FW	Koussay Maacha	21 May 2007 (aged 17)	(Tunisian Football Federation) Espérance de Tunis
9	FW	Omar Ben Ali	22 April 2005 (aged 20)	(Tunisian Football Federation) CS Sfaxien
10	FW	Khalil Ayari	2 February 2005 (aged 20)	(Tunisian Football Federation) Stade Tunisien
11	FW	Youssef Becha	13 April 2005 (aged 20)	(Tunisian Football Federation) CS Sfaxien
18	FW	Nacim Dendani	30 April 2006 (aged 18)	(French Football Federation) Monaco
19	FW	Zayon Chtaï-Telamio	14 October 2006 (aged 18)	(French Football Federation) Paris Saint-Germain
21	FW	Farès Bousnina	13 February 2006 (aged 19)	(French Football Federation) Nice

=== Kenya ===
Coach: Salim Babu

The squad was announced on 16 April 2025.

No.	Pos.	Player	Date of birth (age)	Club
1	GK	Wycliford Oduor		(Football Kenya Federation) Bidco United
18	GK	Kevin Oduor		(Football Kenya Federation) Nairobi United
23	GK	Benard Jairo	30 May 2005 (aged 19)	(Football Kenya Federation) Kariobangi Sharks
2	DF	Baron Ochieng	29 December 2005 (aged 19)	(Football Kenya Federation) Sofapaka
3	DF	Manzur Okwaro		(Football Kenya Federation) KCB
4	DF	Jackson Imbiakha		(Football Kenya Federation) Mombasa Elite
5	DF	Joseph Bate		(Football Kenya Federation) MOFA
15	DF	Amos Wanjala	28 March 2006 (aged 19)	(Royal Spanish Football Federation) Torrellano
19	DF	Telena Ochieng	7 November 2005 (aged 19)	(Football Kenya Federation) Ulinzi Stars
20	DF	Humphrey Obino		(Football Kenya Federation) Murang'a Seal
25	DF	Collins Ochieng		(Danish Football Association) Horsens
6	MF	Kelly Madada		(Football Kenya Federation) Leopards
7	MF	Hassan Beja	26 August 2005 (aged 19)	(Football Kenya Federation) Leopards
8	MF	Kevin Wangaya	30 November 2005 (aged 19)	Unattached
10	MF	Aldrine Kibet	13 June 2006 (aged 18)	(Royal Spanish Football Federation) Nàstic
11	MF	Ezekiel Omuri		(Football Kenya Federation) Shabana
12	MF	Irad Mshindi		(Football Kenya Federation) Musingu Scorpions
13	MF	Elly Owande	16 October 2005 (aged 19)	(United Arab Emirates Football Association) Al-Nasr
16	MF	Javan Omondi		(Football Kenya Federation) Ulinzi Stars
17	MF	Andreas Odhiambo	12 October 2007 (aged 17)	(Football Kenya Federation) Kariobangi Sharks
21	MF	Emilio Brian		(Football Kenya Federation) Ulinzi Stars
22	MF	Humphrey Aroko		(Football Kenya Federation) Kariobangi Sharks
24	MF	William Gitama		(Football Kenya Federation) Bandari
9	FW	Oliver Machaka		(Football Kenya Federation) Kakamega Homeboyz
14	FW	Lawrence Ouma	10 July 2005 (aged 19)	(Football Kenya Federation) MOFA
26	FW	Mark Shaban		(Football Kenya Federation) Gor Mahia

=== Morocco ===
Coach: Mohamed Ouahbi

The squad was announced on 18 April 2025.

No.	Pos.	Player	Date of birth (age)	Club
1	GK	Yanis Benchaouch	10 April 2006 (aged 19)	(French Football Federation) Monaco
12	GK	Abdelhakim Mesbahi	7 September 2005 (aged 19)	(Royal Moroccan Football Federation) FAR
16	GK	Ibrahim Gomis	20 March 2005 (aged 20)	(French Football Federation) Marseille
2	DF	Hamza Koutoune	17 September 2006 (aged 18)	(French Football Federation) Nice
3	DF	Ismaël Baouf	17 September 2006 (aged 18)	(Royal Belgian Football Association) Anderlecht
4	DF	Abdelhamid Aït Boudlal	16 April 2006 (aged 19)	(French Football Federation) Amiens
13	DF	Ahmed Khatir	14 March 2005 (aged 20)	(Royal Belgian Football Association) Beveren
15	DF	Fouad Zahouani	18 April 2006 (aged 19)	(Royal Moroccan Football Federation) Union de Touarga
19	DF	Smail Bakhty	29 November 2006 (aged 18)	(Austrian Football Association) Sturm Graz
20	DF	Juliën Mesbahi	31 January 2006 (aged 19)	(Royal Dutch Football Association) Twente
25	DF	Issa Habri	6 January 2006 (aged 19)	(French Football Federation) Rennais
5	MF	Reda Laalaoui	11 May 2005 (aged 19)	(Royal Moroccan Football Federation) FUS
6	MF	Anas El Makkaoui	9 April 2005 (aged 20)	(Royal Moroccan Football Federation) FUS
8	MF	Hossam Essadak	30 July 2005 (aged 19)	(Royal Moroccan Football Federation) Union de Touarga
14	MF	Ismaël Aouad	22 May 2006 (aged 18)	(French Football Federation) Lens
18	MF	Naoufel El Hannach	7 December 2006 (aged 18)	(French Football Federation) PSG
24	MF	Saad El Haddad	24 July 2005 (aged 19)	(Italian Football Federation) Venezia
26	MF	Amine Boukamir	23 October 2006 (aged 18)	(Royal Belgian Football Association) Charleroi
7	FW	Othmane Maamma	6 October 2005 (aged 19)	(French Football Federation) Montpellier
9	FW	Ayman Arguigue	11 May 2005 (aged 19)	(Royal Spanish Football Federation) Huesca
10	FW	Mouad Dahak	22 July 2005 (aged 19)	(Royal Moroccan Football Federation) Union de Touarga
11	FW	Ilias Boumassaoudi	14 January 2005 (aged 20)	(Royal Dutch Football Association) Den Bosch
17	FW	Jones El-Abdellaoui	12 January 2006 (aged 19)	(Royal Spanish Football Federation) Celta Vigo
21	FW	Yassir Zabiri	23 February 2005 (aged 20)	(Portuguese Football Federation) Famalicão
22	FW	Adnane Kharroubi	3 August 2006 (aged 18)	(French Football Federation) Caen
23	FW	Adam El Mokhtari	13 October 2005 (aged 19)	(Royal Spanish Football Federation) Elche

== Group C ==
=== Senegal ===
Coach: Serigne Saliou Dia

The squad was announced on 18 April 2025.

No.	Pos.	Player	Date of birth (age)	Club
1	GK	Mamadou Kara Sèye	20 March 2005 (age 21)	(Senegalese Football Federation) Étoile Lusitana
16	GK	Mouhamed Sissokho	21 January 2005 (age 21)	(Senegalese Football Federation) Amitié
23	GK	Alioune Sarr Ndao		(Senegalese Football Federation) Dakar Sacré-Cœur
2	DF	Taly Dia	10 July 2008 (age 18)	(Senegalese Football Federation) United Académie
3	DF	Ousmane Konaté	15 March 2005 (aged 20)	(Senegalese Football Federation) Douanes
4	DF	Fallou Diouf	31 December 2006 (aged 18)	(Senegalese Football Federation) Génération Foot
12	DF	Lassana Traoré	6 May 2007 (aged 17)	(Senegalese Football Federation) Diambars
17	DF	Ibrahima Diallo	13 September 2007 (aged 17)	(Senegalese Football Federation) Génération Foot
20	DF	Khalifa Diouf		(Senegalese Football Federation) Douanes
5	MF	Omar Sarr	6 January 2008 (age 18)	(Senegalese Football Federation) Diambars
6	MF	Pape Diong	15 June 2006 (aged 18)	(French Football Federation) Strasbourg
8	MF	Cheikh Thiam		(Senegalese Football Federation) Oslo Football Académie
10	MF	Seydi Diouck		(Senegalese Football Federation) Pikine
14	MF	Pierre Dorival	15 March 2006 (aged 19)	(French Football Federation) Lyon
15	MF	Ousseynou Seck		(Senegalese Football Federation) AJEL de Rufisque
7	FW	Yaya Diémé	16 October 2007 (aged 17)	(Senegalese Football Federation) Diambars
9	FW	Ibrahima Dieng	31 August 2005 (aged 19)	(Senegalese Football Federation) Pikine
11	FW	Amidou Badji	25 May 2005 (aged 19)	(Senegalese Football Federation) Espoirs Guédiawaye
13	FW	Abdourahmane Dia	27 November 2005 (age 20)	(Senegalese Football Federation) Académie Foot Darou Salam
18	FW	Clayton Diandy	29 July 2006 (aged 18)	(Hellenic Football Federation) Aris
19	FW	Papa Gaye	15 May 2006 (aged 18)	(Swiss Football Association) Sion
21	FW	Norbert Gomis		(Senegalese Football Federation) Dakar
22	FW	Mame Faye	12 July 2005 (aged 19)	(Turkish Football Federation) Esenler Erokspor

=== Central African Republic ===
The final squad was announced on 24 April 2025.

Head coach: (Republic of the Congo) Bruce Abdoulaye

No.	Pos.	Player	Date of birth (age)	Club
1	GK	Boarnages Malimoto		(Central African Football Federation) Tempête Mocaf
16	GK	Eugène Ganazoui		(Central African Football Federation) EFDY
22	GK	Nick Maliki		(Central African Football Federation) DFC8
2	DF	Perry Ouaguan		(Central African Football Federation) SOS
3	DF	Raphaël Nzabakomada-Yakoma	22 May 2007 (aged 17)	(French Football Federation) Angers
4	DF	Jéhovany Ondobo		(Central African Football Federation) DFC8
5	DF	Tony Biakolo	27 August 2006 (aged 18)	(Swiss Football Association) Meyrin
17	DF	Kylan Chasseport	8 June 2007 (aged 17)	(French Football Federation) Chamois Niortais
21	DF	Junior Guiningbi-Yapou		(Central African Football Federation) DFC8
23	DF	Abdias Etienne Yangba	12 May 2006 (aged 18)	(Italian Football Federation) Brindisi
25	DF	Christophe Gongoro-Pingo		(Central African Football Federation) Tempête Mocaf
6	MF	Junior Nganza		(Central African Football Federation) Olympic Real
8	MF	Uchaël Borobona	13 May 2007 (aged 17)	(French Football Federation) Clermont Foot
10	MF	Jores Mbaïgoto		(Central African Football Federation) Gbangré
18	MF	Benjamin Idaro	26 January 2005 (aged 20)	(Italian Football Federation) Bologna
19	MF	Yannis Doté		(French Football Federation) FC Nogentais
20	MF	Dorkem Mbaïkoua-Bemaïde		(French Football Federation) Lyon-La Duchère
24	MF	Benito Endjito		(Central African Football Federation) EFC5
26	MF	Nelson Ngaro		(Central African Football Federation) Castel Foot
7	FW	Ronaldo Zé	17 July 2006 (aged 18)	(Central African Football Federation) Douanes
9	FW	Bradley Besnard		(French Football Federation) Cholet
11	FW	Landry Tsoungui-Abega		(Central African Football Federation) Douanes
12	FW	Rayan Kolingba		(French Football Federation) Bellevue
13	FW	Lefort Kossina Bamsou		(Central African Football Federation) EFC5
14	FW	Diogène Pengazonia		(Central African Football Federation) FDS
15	FW	Baptiste Kilala	7 June 2007 (aged 17)	(Royal Belgian Football Association) Royal Antwerp

=== DR Congo ===
Coach: Guy Bukasa

The squad was announced on 21 April 2025.

No.	Pos.	Player	Date of birth (age)	Club
1	GK	Ikie Utshudi	12 March 2005 (aged 20)	(Congolese Association Football Federation) Don Bosco
16	GK	Yohann Bopaka	10 January 2006 (aged 19)	(Swiss Football Association) Basel
21	GK	Ryan Tutu	1 April 2005 (aged 20)	(French Football Federation) Strasbourg
2	DF	David Mukandila	10 July 2007 (aged 17)	(Congolese Association Football Federation) TP les Anges
3	DF	Merdi Palato		(French Football Federation) Sochaux
4	DF	Cédrick Salumu	5 February 2005 (aged 20)	(Congolese Association Football Federation) Dauphins Noirs
5	DF	Frédéric Efuele	20 February 2005 (aged 20)	(French Football Federation) Toulouse
14	DF	Eugène Idumbo	20 November 2005 (aged 19)	(Congolese Association Football Federation) Aigles du Congo
18	DF	Dieu Kalonji	5 August 2006 (aged 18)	(Congolese Association Football Federation) Céleste
19	DF	Daniel Tshilanda	27 April 2006 (aged 19)	(Royal Belgian Football Association) Union Saint-Gilloise
20	DF	Landry Soko		(Congolese Association Football Federation) Aigles du Congo
6	MF	Jules Ahoka	17 December 2005 (aged 19)	(Congolese Association Football Federation) Normands
8	MF	Kevin Makoko	31 July 2007 (aged 17)	(Congolese Association Football Federation) Vita Club
10	MF	Messy Mubundu	5 January 2006 (aged 19)	(French Football Federation) Amiens
12	MF	Dieu Lukombe	12 August 2006 (aged 18)	(Congolese Association Football Federation) Vita Club
15	MF	Honoré Bayanginisa	27 April 2006 (aged 19)	(French Football Federation) Sochaux
22	MF	Noah Makanza	14 January 2005 (aged 20)	(Royal Belgian Football Association) Mechelen
23	MF	Grady Katungulu	30 November 2006 (aged 18)	(Congolese Association Football Federation) Anges Verts
7	FW	Ibrahim Matobo	5 December 2005 (aged 19)	(Congolese Association Football Federation) Aigles du Congo
9	FW	Samuel Ntanda	30 June 2005 (aged 19)	(Italian Football Federation) Sampdoria
13	FW	Meschack Tshimanga	19 December 2005 (aged 19)	(Congolese Association Football Federation) Don Bosco
17	FW	Tonny Talasi	13 August 2006 (aged 18)	(Congolese Association Football Federation) Anges Verts
24	FW	Isaac Lufuiku	26 June 2006 (aged 18)	(French Football Federation) Caen
25	FW	Faveurdi Bongeli	21 March 2007 (aged 18)	(Congolese Association Football Federation) Mazembe

=== Ghana ===
Coach: Desmond Ofei

The squad was announced on 21 April 2025.

No.	Pos.	Player	Date of birth (age)	Club
1	GK	Gidios Aseako	19 January 2005 (aged 20)	(Ghana Football Association) Dreams
16	GK	Yakubu Saeed	31 December 2006 (aged 18)	(Ghana Football Association) Medeama
21	GK	Patrick Arthur	9 October 2005 (aged 19)	(Ghana Football Association) Nsuopun Fidelity
3	DF	McCarthy Ofori	3 May 2005 (aged 19)	(Albanian Football Federation) Bylis
4	DF	Dacosta Antwi	6 March 2007 (aged 18)	(Ghana Football Association) Young Apostles
5	DF	Nana Kwame Boakye	5 December 2005 (aged 19)	(Moldovan Football Federation) Sheriff Tiraspol
6	DF	Kelvin Ahiable	24 June 2005 (aged 19)	(Ghana Football Association) Dreams
14	DF	Aaron Essel	30 July 2005 (aged 19)	(United States Soccer Federation) North Texas
17	DF	Phenyin-Denis Marfo	28 January 2006 (aged 19)	(Brazilian Football Confederation) Internacional
18	DF	Maxwell Azafokpe	28 December 2006 (aged 18)	(Ghana Football Association) Inter Allies
2	MF	Michael Amer	13 July 2006 (aged 18)	(Ghana Football Association) Nice Ibrahim
7	MF	Emmanuel Mensah	18 June 2005 (aged 19)	(Norwegian Football Federation) Sogndal
8	MF	Ishmael Addo	23 December 2006 (aged 18)	(Ghana Football Association) Heart of Lions
9	MF	Lord Afrifa	5 June 2006 (aged 18)	(Austrian Football Association) Sturm Graz
10	MF	Aziz Issah	20 November 2005 (aged 19)	(Royal Spanish Football Federation) Barcelona
15	MF	Andrews Adjabeng	4 March 2006 (aged 19)	(Royal Spanish Football Federation) Real Sociedad
20	MF	Abdul Hakim Sulemana	19 February 2005 (aged 20)	(Danish Football Association) Randers
22	MF	Kelvin Nkrumah	11 September 2007 (aged 17)	(Ghana Football Association) Medeama
23	MF	Hayford Boahen	14 December 2005 (aged 19)	(Ghana Football Association) Cheetah
25	MF	Joseph Aidoo	19 February 2005 (aged 20)	(Romanian Football Federation) Sănătatea
11	FW	Jerry Afriyie	10 December 2006 (aged 18)	(Royal Spanish Football Federation) Lugo
12	FW	Joseph Opoku	8 August 2005 (aged 19)	(Royal Belgian Football Association) Zulte Waregem
13	FW	George Tei Nagadzi	14 October 2005 (aged 19)	(Ghana Football Association) Vision
19	FW	Aziz Musibau	30 December 2006 (aged 18)	(Ghana Football Association) Dreams
24	FW	Clinton Duodu	20 June 2005 (aged 19)	(Cyprus Football Association) Apollon
26	FW	Araphat Mohammed	6 November 2005 (aged 19)	(Danish Football Association) Nordsjælland
