= Alieu =

Alieu is a West African male given name, which means "strong" and has its origins with the Fula people. It was a common name in the Fulani royal families and used to be reserved for royalty. This practice has continued in many Fulani clans today, most notably the Barry, Bah and Jallow clans. Alieu is a traditional male name in Gambia. The name may refer to:

- Alieu Badara Saja Taal (1944–2014), Gambian academic and politician
- Alieu Badara Njie (1904-1982), Gambian statesman
- Alieu Darbo (born 1992), Gambian soccer player
- Alieu Ebrima Cham Joof (1924-2011), Gambian historian, politician, author
- Alieu Eybi Njie (born 2005), Swedish soccer player of Gambian descent
- Alieu Fadera (born 2001), Gambian soccer player
- Alieu Jatta (born 1995), Gambian soccer player
- Alieu Njie (born 1955), American soccer player of Gambian descent
- Alieu Kosiah (born 1975), Liberian ULIMO commander
- Baboucarr Alieu Ceesay (born 1979), British actor of Gambian descent
- Omar Alieu Touray (born 1965), Gambian diplomat
- Omar Alieu Koroma (born 1989), Gambian soccer player
- John Alieu Carew (born 1979), Norwegian soccer player of Gambian Jola descent
