= 2024 UNAF U-20 Tournament =

Tournament details
- Country: Egypt
- Dates: 14–26 November
- Teams: 5

Final positions
- Champions: Morocco (3rd title)
- Runners-up: Egypt
- Third place: Tunisia

Tournament statistics
- Matches played: 10
- Goals scored: 28 (2.8 per match)

The 2024 UNAF U-20 Tournament officially named TotalEnergies U-20 Africa Cup of Nations - UNAF Qualifiers 2024 was the 17th edition of the UNAF U-20 Tournament. The tournament took place in Egypt, from 14 to 26 November 2024. The tournament also served as the qualifiers for the 2025 U-20 Africa Cup of Nations.

== Participants ==
The five participating teams were:

- Algeria
- Egypt (hosts)
- Libya
- Morocco
- Tunisia

== Venues ==
Cities	Venues	Capacity
Ismailia	Suez Canal Stadium	27,000
Ismailia	Ismailia Stadium	30,000

== Tournament ==
Pos	Team	Pld	W	D	L	GF	GA	GD	Pts	Qualification
1	Morocco	4	3	1	0	9	3	+6	10	2025 U-20 Africa Cup of Nations
2	Egypt (H)	4	2	1	1	5	4	+1	7	2025 U-20 Africa Cup of Nations
3	Tunisia	4	2	0	2	5	5	0	6	2025 U-20 Africa Cup of Nations
4	Algeria	4	1	2	1	7	4	+3	5	
5	Libya	4	0	0	4	2	12	−10	0	

Source: UNAF
Rules for classification: 1) Points; 2) Goal difference; 3) Goals scored
(H) Hosts

=== Matches ===
14 November 2024
17:00

Libya	1–2	Tunisia
Omar Al Harak 40'		Sadek Mahmoud 21'; Youssef Becha 87' (pen.)

Suez Canal Stadium, Ismailia
14 November 2024
20:00

Morocco	2–1	Egypt
Saad El Haddad 40'; Othmane Maamma 69'		Mahamed El Bana 50'

Suez Canal Stadium, Ismailia

17 November 2024
17:00

Tunisia	1–2	Morocco
Khalil Ayari 1'		Mouad Dahak 49'; Reda Laalaoui 72'

Suez Canal Stadium, Ismailia
17 November 2024
20:00

Algeria	1–1	Egypt
Ben Ahmed Kohili 86' (pen.)		Mohamed Zaalouk 57'

Suez Canal Stadium, Ismailia

20 November 2024
17:00

Libya	1–2	Egypt
Abdulaziz Mansour 77'		Ahmed Kabaka 75' (pen.); Abdallah Bostangy 90'

Suez Canal Stadium, Ismailia
20 November 2024
20:00

Algeria	1–1	Morocco
Mohamed Zeghadi 14'		Yassir Zabiri 86'

Suez Canal Stadium, Ismailia

23 November 2024
17:00

Tunisia	2–1	Algeria
Issam Abdelhamid Naïm 76' (o.g.); Amanallah Mehrezi 90+6'		Islam Abbes 81'

Suez Canal Stadium, Ismailia
23 November 2024
20:00

Morocco	4–0	Libya
Mouad Dahak 27' (pen.); Naoufel El Hannach 45+3'; Ayman Arguigue 53'; Saad El Haddad 72'

Suez Canal Stadium, Ismailia

26 November 2024
18:00

Algeria	4–0	Libya
Lahlou Akhrib 75', 80'; Oussama Benattia 78'; Mohamed Ramdaoui 84'

Ismailia Stadium, Ismailia
26 November 2024
18:00

Egypt	1–0	Tunisia
Fares Khaled (red card) 40'; Ahmed Kabaka 54'

Suez Canal Stadium, Ismailia

== Statistics ==
=== Goalscorers ===
There were 28 goals scored in 10 matches, for an average of 2.8 goals per match.

2 goals

- (Algeria) Lahlou Akhrib
- (Egypt) Ahmed Kabaka
- (Morocco) Mouad Dahak
- (Morocco) Saad El Haddad

1 goal

- (Algeria) Islam Abbes
- (Algeria) Kohili Benahmed
- (Algeria) Oussama Benattia
- (Algeria) Mohamed Ramdaoui
- (Algeria) Mohamed Zeghadi
- (Egypt) Abdallah Bostangy
- (Egypt) Mahamed El Bana
- (Egypt) Mohamed Zaalouk
- (Libya) Omar Al Harak
- (Libya) Abdulaziz Mansour
- (Morocco) Ayman Arguigue
- (Morocco) Naoufel El Hannach
- (Morocco) Reda Laalaoui
- (Morocco) Othmane Maamma
- (Morocco) Yassir Zabiri
- (Tunisia) Khalil Ayari
- (Tunisia) Youssef Becha
- (Tunisia) Sadek Mahmoud
- (Tunisia) Amanallah Mehrezi

1 own goal

- (Algeria) Issam Abdelhamid Naïm (against Tunisia)

== Qualified teams for U-20 Africa Cup of Nations ==
The following three teams from UNAF qualified for the 2025 U-20 Africa Cup of Nations.

Team	Qualified on	Previous appearances in U-20 Africa Cup of Nations^{1}
Morocco	23 November 2024	11 (1979, 1981, 1983, 1985, 1987, 1989, 1993, **1997**, 2003, 2005, 2021)
Egypt	26 November 2024	18 (1979, **1981**, 1983, 1985, 1987, 1989, **1991**, 1993, 1997, 2001, **2003**, 2005, 2007, 2009, 2011, **2013**, 2017, 2023)
Tunisia	10 April 2025	8 (1979, 1981, 1983, 1985, 1987, 1989, 2021, 2023)

^{1} Bold indicates champion for that year. Italic indicates host for that year.
