= 2023–24 Smouha SC season =

Smouha SC
2023–24 season
- Manager: Ahmed Samy
- Stadium: Alexandria Stadium
- Egyptian Premier League: 6th
- Egypt Cup: Round of 16
- Egyptian League Cup: Quarter-finals

The 2023–24 Smouha SC season was the club's 75th season in existence and the 14th consecutive season in the top flight of Egyptian football. In addition to the domestic league, Smouha participated in this season's editions of the Egypt Cup, and the League Cup.

== Transfers ==
=== In ===
Pos.	Player	Transferred from	Fee	Date	Source
DF	Abdallah Bostangy	Al Ahly	Loan	22 February 2024	

=== Out ===
Pos.	Player	Transferred to	Fee	Date	Source
MF	(Egypt) Mostafa El Khawaga	(Egypt) Tala'ea El Gaish		6 August 2023	

== Pre-season and friendlies ==
Win Draw Loss

4 September 2023 Friendly	Smouha (Egypt)	2–3	(Egypt) ENPPI	Alexandria
	Mido; Farid	Report	Kabou; Zayed	Stadium: Alexandria Stadium

== Competitions ==
=== Overall record ===
Competition	First match	Last match	Starting round	Final position	Record							
Competition	First match	Last match	Starting round	Final position	Pld	W	D	L	GF	GA	GD	Win %
Egyptian Premier League	20 September 2023	August 2024	Matchday 1	6th	34	15	9	10	39	35	+4	44.12
2023–24 Egypt Cup	28 May 2024	21 August 2024	Round of 32	Round of 16	2	1	0	1	1	2	−1	50.00
Egyptian League Cup	8 January 2024	1 February 2024	Group stage	Quarter-finals	4	1	1	2	2	3	−1	25.00
Total					40	17	10	13	42	40	+2	42.50

Source: Competitions

=== Egyptian Premier League ===
==== League table ====
Pos	Team	Pld	W	D	L	GF	GA	GD	Pts	Qualification or relegation
4	Al Masry	34	16	7	11	41	39	+2	55	Qualification for the Confederation Cup second round (Note: The league was not finished by the CAF deadline for associations to submit teams participating in next season's CAF competitions. As a result, Al Masry, who finished the first half of the season at third place (and were also at third place by the time of the draw) qualified for the CAF Confederation Cup.)
5	Modern Future	34	14	12	8	40	28	+12	54 (Note: Head-to-head points: Modern Future 4, Smouha 1.)	
6	Smouha	34	15	9	10	39	35	+4	54	
7	ZED	34	13	12	9	48	35	+13	51	
8	Ceramica Cleopatra	34	12	10	12	51	42	+9	46	

Source: Soccerway
Rules for classification: 1) Points; 2) Head-to-head points; 3) Head-to-head goal difference; 4) Goal difference; 5) Goals scored; 6) Play-off tie.
(Note: Head-to-head records are used for final standings only)

==== Results summary ====
Overall								Home						Away					
Pld	W	D	L	GF	GA	GD	Pts	W	D	L	GF	GA	GD	W	D	L	GF	GA	GD
25	10	8	7	27	25	+2	38	7	3	2	18	10	+8	3	5	5	9	15	−6

Last updated: 18 June 2024.

==== Results by round ====
Round	1
Ground	H
Result	D
Position	10

A = Away; H = Home; W = Win; D = Draw; L = Loss

==== Matches ====
The league fixtures were unveiled on 11 September 2023.

20 September 2023 1	Smouha	1–1	El Gouna	Alexandria
19:00 UTC+3	Farid 4', (yellow card) 44'; Reda (penalty missed) 59'; Gaber (yellow card) 72'; Mostafa (yellow card) 90+1'	Report	Khaled (yellow card) 38'; El Sayed (yellow card) 51'; Jatta (yellow card) 55'; El Sabahi (yellow card) 65'; Belhadji 90+4'	Stadium: Alexandria Stadium; Referee: Mohamed El Atabani

26 September 2023 2	Baladiyat El Mahalla	0–2	Smouha	El Mahalla El Kubra
16:00 UTC+3		Report	Khaled 43'; Kalawa 56' (pen.); Alaa (yellow card) 60'	Stadium: El Mahalla Stadium; Referee: Mohamed Al Ghazi

5 October 2023 3	Smouha	2–1	Al Mokawloon	Alexandria
19:00 UTC+3	El Badry 17'; Farid 39' (pen.)		Ochaya 28' (pen.)	Stadium: Alexandria Stadium; Referee: Mahmoud Wafa

21 October 2023 4	Zamalek	5–1	Smouha	Cairo
19:00 UTC+3	Shalaby 3'; Zizo 13', (penalty missed) 45+1'; Obama 45+5'; Jaziri 81'; Shikabala 88'		Farid 67'	Stadium: Cairo International Stadium; Referee: Mohammed Yousef

15 December 2023 9	El Dakhleya	0–0	Smouha	Cairo
16:00 UTC+2				Stadium: Al Salam Stadium; Referee: Ahmed Hamdi

27 December 2023 10	Smouha	1–0	Tala'ea El Gaish	Alexandria
19:00	Hassan 31' (pen.)			Stadium: Alexandria Stadium; Referee: Hamada Al-Qalawi

13 February 2024 12	Smouha	1–1	National Bank	Alexandria
19:00 UTC+2	Hassan 85'		Annor 35'	Stadium: Alexandria Stadium; Referee: Hamada Al-Qalawi

18 February 2024 13	ENPPI	0–0	Smouha	Cairo
16:00 UTC+2				Stadium: Petrosport Stadium; Referee: Mahmoud Nassif

29 February 2024 14	Smouha	1–1	Modern Future	Alexandria
19:00 UTC+2	Hassan 28' (pen.); El Maghraby (yellow card) 31' (yellow-red card) 44'		Rezk (yellow card) 24' (red card) 27'; Ngwem 45+8'	Stadium: Alexandria Stadium; Referee: Mohamed El Ghazi

5 March 2024 15	Al Masry	2–0	Smouha	Alexandria
19:00 UTC+2	Ben Youssef 9'; Zaddem 76'			Stadium: Borg El Arab Stadium; Referee: Mohamed El Atabani

10 March 2024 16	Smouha	1–0	Ceramica Cleopatra	Alexandria
16:00 UTC+2	Hassan 23'		Ibrahim (penalty missed) 90+5'	Stadium: Alexandria Stadium; Referee: Nader Qamar al-Dawla

3 April 2024 17	Ismaily	2–1	Smouha

17 April 2024 18	El Gouna	1–0	Smouha

23 April 2024 19	Smouha	4–0	Baladiyat El Mahalla

28 April 2024 20	Al Mokawloon Al Arab	0–1	Smouha

5 May 2024 21	Smouha	1–0	Zamalek

9 May 2024 22	Smouha	1–2	ZED

14 May 2024 23	Al Ittihad	0–2	Smouha

24 May 2024 25	Pharco	1–1	Smouha

13 June 2024 11	Pyramids	3–0	Smouha	Cairo
				Stadium: 30 June Stadium

18 June 2024 26	Smouha	3–2	El Dakhleya

22 June 2024 27	Tala'ea Al Gaish	2–2	Smouha

2 July 2024 28	Smouha	2–3	Pyramids

6 July 2024 30	Smouha	2–0	ENPPI

13 July 2024 29	National Bank	1–2	Smouha

22 July 2024 31	Modern Sport	3–0	Smouha

1 August 2024 32	Smouha	1–0	Al Masry

8 August 2024 24	Smouha	0–1	Al Ahly

12 August 2024 33	Ceramica Cleopatra	0–1	Smouha

16 August 2024 34	Smouha	2–0	Ismaily

=== Egypt Cup ===
28 May 2024 Round of 32	Smouha	1–0	La Viena FC

21 August 2024 Round of 16	Ismaily	2–0	Smouha
