= Hamza Koutoune =

Moroccan footballer (born 2006)

Personal information
- Date of birth: 17 September 2006 (age 20)
- Place of birth: Casablanca, Morocco
- Height: 1.77 m (5 ft 10 in)
- Position: Right-back

Team information
- Current team: Nice
- Number: 84

Youth career
- 2016–2021: Raja CA
- 2021–2025: Mohammed VI Football Academy
- 2024: → Union Touarga (loan)
- 2025: Nice

Senior career*
| Years | Team | Apps | (Gls) |
| 2025– | Nice | 3 | (0) |
| 2025–2026 | → Annecy (loan) | 7 | (0) |

International career^{‡}
| 2020 | Morocco U15 | 2 | (0) |
| 2021 | Morocco U16 | 2 | (0) |
| 2022–2023 | Morocco U17 | 16 | (1) |
| 2023 | Morocco U18 | 1 | (0) |
| 2024– | Morocco U20 | 17 | (0) |
- * Club domestic league appearances and goals as of 30 August 2026 ‡ National team caps and goals as of 21:13, 8 September 2025 (UTC)

Hamza Koutoune (Arabic: حمزة كوتون; born 17 September 2006) is a Moroccan professional football player who plays as a right-back for French Ligue 1 club Nice.

== Career ==
Koutoune is a product of the youth academies of the Moroccan clubs Raja CA and Mohammed VI Football Academy, before joining Nice's youth academy on 9 January 2005. He debuted with the senior Nice side in a 2–0 loss to Benfica in a 2025–26 UEFA Champions League qualifying match on 12 August 2025. 11 days later, he made his Ligue 1 debut for Nice against Auxerre.

On 1 September 2025, Koutoune was loaned to Annecy in Ligue 2 for the season.

== International career ==
Koutoune was called up to the Morocco U17 for the 2023 U-17 Africa Cup of Nations. That same year he made the U17 squad for the 2023 FIFA U-17 World Cup. In April 2025, he was called up to the Morocco U20s for the 2025 U-20 Africa Cup of Nations.

== Career statistics ==
As of match played 30 August 2026

Appearances and goals by club, season and competition
| Club | Season | League | | | Cup | | Europe | | Total | |
| Club | Season | Division | Apps | Goals | Apps | Goals | Apps | Goals | Apps | Goals |
|---|---|---|---|---|---|---|---|---|---|---|
| Nice | 2025–26 | Ligue 1 | 1 | 0 | 0 | 0 | 1 (Note: Appearance in UEFA Champions League) | 0 | 2 | 0 |
| Nice | 2026–27 | Ligue 1 | 2 | 0 | 0 | 0 | — | | 2 | 0 |
| Nice | Total | | 3 | 0 | 0 | 0 | 1 | 0 | 4 | 0 |
| Annecy (loan) | 2025–26 | Ligue 2 | 7 | 0 | 1 | 0 | — | | 8 | 0 |
| Career total | | | 10 | 0 | 1 | 0 | 1 | 0 | 12 | 0 |

== Honours ==
Morocco U17

- UNAF U-17 Tournament: 2022

Morocco U20

- UNAF U-20 Tournament: 2024

Individual

- 2025 U-20 Africa Cup of Nations Team of the Tournament
