= Ali Maamar =

Moroccan footballer

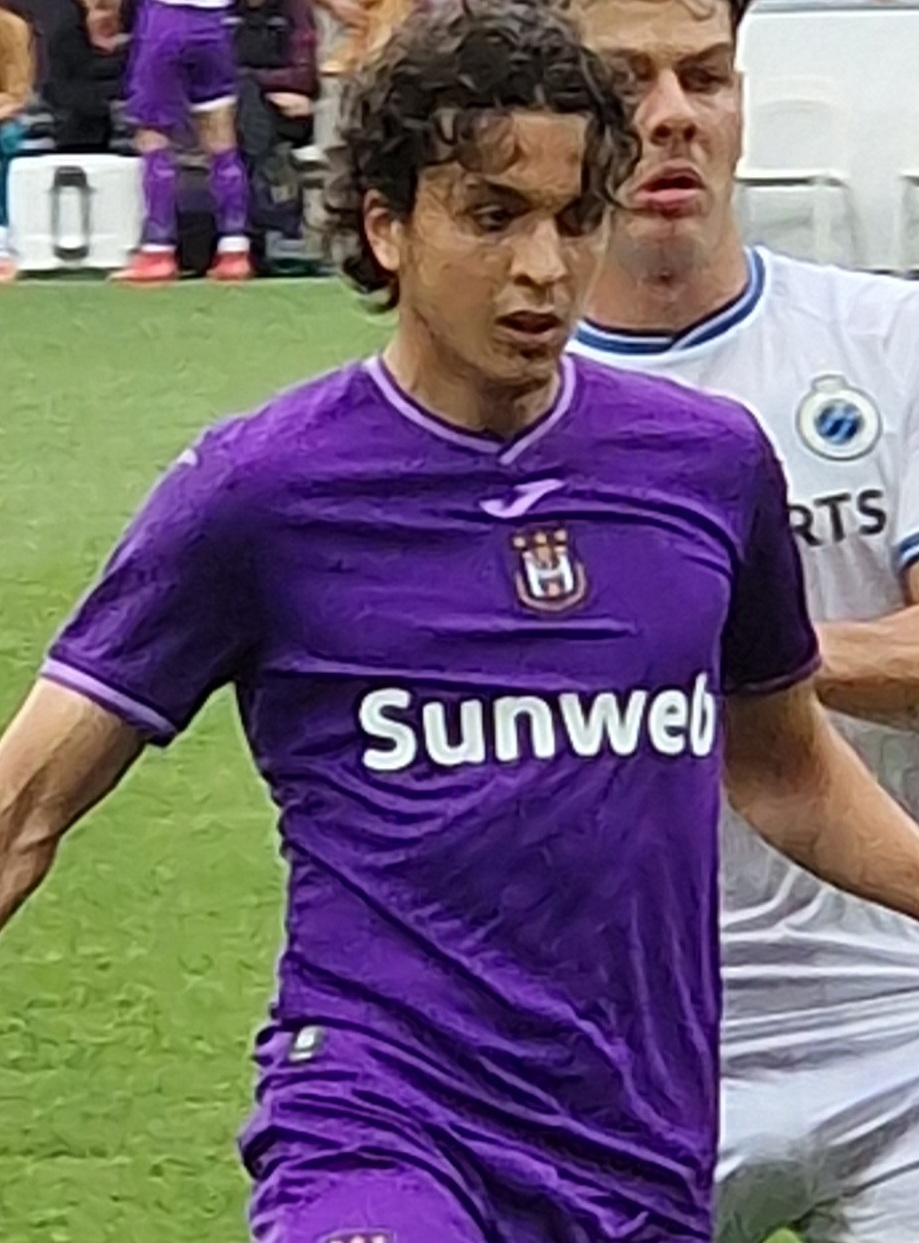
- Maamar playing for Anderlecht in 2025

Personal information
- Date of birth: 23 March 2005 (age 21)
- Place of birth: Brussels, Belgium
- Height: 1.82 m (6 ft 0 in)
- Position: Right-back

Team information
- Current team: Anderlecht
- Number: 79

Youth career
- 2011–2013: Anderlecht
- 2013–2015: Lierse
- 2015–2019: Mechelen
- 2019–2023: Anderlecht

Senior career*
Years	Team	Apps	(Gls)
2022–2025	RSCA Futures	26	(0)
2025–	Anderlecht	49	(0)

International career^{‡}
2021	Belgium U17	1	(0)
2023–2025	Morocco U20	28	(0)
2026–	Morocco	3	(0)
Medal record
Men's football
Representing Morocco
FIFA U-20 World Cup
Winner	2025 Chile
- * Club domestic league appearances and goals as of 25 October 2026 ‡ National team caps and goals as of 5 October 2026

Ali Maamar (Arabic: علي معمر; born 23 March 2005) is a professional footballer who plays as a right-back for Belgian Pro League club Anderlecht. Born in Belgium, he plays for the Morocco national team.

== Club career ==
Maamar was a product of the youth academies of Belgian clubs Anderlecht, Lierse, and Mechelen, before returning to Anderlecht in 2019 to finish his development. He began playing with RSCA Futures in 2022, and on 3 May 2024 signed his first professional contract with Anderlecht until 2026. He made his senior debut with Anderlecht in a 3–0 Belgian Pro League loss to Club Brugge on 12 January 2025. On 16 January 2025, he extended his contract with Anderlecht until 2028.

== International career ==
Born in Belgium, Maamar is of Moroccan descent and holds dual Belgian-Moroccan citizenship. He made one appearance for the Belgium U17s in 2021. He was called up to the Morocco U20 in their winning campaign at the 2024 UNAF U-20 Tournament. He made the final Morocco U20 squad in their winning campaign at 2025 FIFA U-20 World Cup.

Maamar was called up to the senior Morocco national team for a set of friendlies in June 2026.

== Career statistics ==
=== Club ===
As of match played 25 October 2026

Appearances and goals by club, season and competition
Club	Season	League			Belgian Cup		Europe		Other		Total	
Club	Season	Division	Apps	Goals	Apps	Goals	Apps	Goals	Apps	Goals	Apps	Goals
RSCA Futures	2022–23	Challenger Pro League	4	0	—		—		—		4	0
RSCA Futures	2023–24	Challenger Pro League	10	0	—		—		—		10	0
RSCA Futures	2024–25	Challenger Pro League	12	0	—		—		—		12	0
RSCA Futures	Total		26	0	—		—		—		26	0
Anderlecht	2024–25	Belgian Pro League	15	0	2	0	3 (Note: Appearances in UEFA Europa League)	0	—		20	0
Anderlecht	2025–26	Belgian Pro League	25	0	3	0	4 (Note: Two appearances in UEFA Europa League, two appearances in UEFA Conference League)	0	—		32	0
Anderlecht	2026–27	Belgian Pro League	9	0	1	0	7	0	—		17	0
Anderlecht	Total		49	0	6	0	14	0	—		69	0
Career total			75	0	6	0	14	0	0	0	95	0

=== International ===
As of match played 4 October 2026

Appearances and goals by national team and year
National team	Year	Apps	Goals
Morocco	2026	3	0
Total		3	0

== Honours ==
Morocco U20

- FIFA U-20 World Cup: 2025
- UNAF U-20 Tournament: 2024
