= Mouad Dahak =

Moroccan footballer (born 2005)

Personal information
- Date of birth: 23 July 2005 (age 21)
- Place of birth: Casablanca, Morocco
- Height: 1.65 m (5 ft 5 in)
- Position: Winger

Team information
- Current team: Raja CA (on loan from Union Touarga)

Youth career
- 2014–2024: Mohammed VI Academy

Senior career*
Years	Team	Apps	(Gls)
2024–	Union Touarga	30	(9)
2025–	→ Raja CA (loan)	8	(0)

International career^{‡}
2023–	Morocco U-20	25	(8)
Medal record
Men's football
Representing Morocco
UNAF U-20 Tournament
Winner	2025 Egypt
U-20 Africa Cup of Nations
Runner-up	2025 Egypt
- * Club domestic league appearances and goals as of 5 February 2026 ‡ National team caps and goals as of 7 August 2025

Mouad Dahak (Arabic: معاد ضحاك; born 22 July 2005) is a Moroccan professional footballer who plays as a winger for Botola club Raja CA, on loan from Union Touarga.

== Early life ==
Born on 22 July 2005 in Casablanca, Dahak joined the Mohammed VI Academy in 2014 under the direction of Nasser Larguet.

== Club career ==
During the 2022–23 season, Dahak was voted best player at the Mohammed VI Tournament, with several European academies in attendance. He also received interest from several French clubs.

In January 2024, he signed his first professional contract with US Touarga. He then began his career in Botola midway through the 2023–24 season, making his professional debut on 7 February 2024, against RCA Zemamra (1–1 win).

On 27 April, he scored his first goal against Chabab Mohammédia in El Bachir Stadium (2–0 win).

During the 2024–25 season, he emerged as one of the top prospects in the Moroccan league. However, the club refused to release him during the winter transfer window.

On 6 August 2025, he joined his beloved club, Raja CA, on a one-season loan with a buy-option.

== International career ==
Dahak is a Moroccan international, starting with the under-20 national team under Mohammed Ouahbi.

In November 2024, he won the 2024 UNAF U-20 Tournament and qualified for the next Africa Cup of Nations. During this tournament, he scored two goals and provided two assists in four matches. He was also voted man of the match against Egypt and Libya.

In April 2025, he was selected to take part in the 2025 U-20 Africa Cup of Nations in Egypt. He was then one of the Moroccan players to watch, according to the international press. The Moroccans started by beating Kenya 3–2 in an exciting match. Then, they played a tough game against Nigeria that ended in a 0–0 draw before beating Tunisia 3–1 In their last group match. In the quarterfinal, Morocco beat Sierra Leone 1–0 in extra time. Then they defeated Egypt 1–0 to reach the final where they lost 1–0 to South Africa.

== Honours ==
Morocco U20

- UNAF U-20 Tournament: 2024
- Africa U-20 Cup of Nations runner-up: 2025
