= Sierra Leone national under-20 football team =

National under-20 association football team representing Sierra Leone

Sierra Leone U-20
- Nickname: Shooting Stars
- Association: Sierra Leone Football Association
- Confederation: CAF (Africa)
- Sub-confederation: WAFU (West Africa)
- Head coach: Mustapha Dumbuya
- Home stadium: Freetown National Stadium
| First colours | Second colours |

U-20 Africa Cup of Nations
- Appearances: 1 (first in 2025)
- Best result: Quarter-final (2025)

FIFA U-20 World Cup
- Appearances: None

The Sierra Leone national under-20 football team, nicknamed the Shooting Stars, represents Sierra Leone in international youth football competitions. Its primary role is the development of players in preparation for the senior national team. The team competes in a variety of competitions, including the biennial FIFA U-20 World Cup and the U-20 Africa Cup of Nations, which is the top competitions for this age group.

== Competitive record ==
=== FIFA U-20 World Cup record ===
FIFA U-20 World Cup record
| Year | Round | GP | W | D^{1} | L | GS | GA |
|---|---|---|---|---|---|---|---|
| (Tunisia) 1977 | Did not qualify | | | | | | |
| (Japan) 1979 | Did not qualify | | | | | | |
| (Australia) 1981 | Did not qualify | | | | | | |
| (Mexico) 1983 | Did not qualify | | | | | | |
| (Soviet Union) 1985 | Did not qualify | | | | | | |
| (Chile) 1987 | Did not qualify | | | | | | |
| (Saudi Arabia) 1989 | Did not qualify | | | | | | |
| (Portugal) 1991 | Did not qualify | | | | | | |
| (Australia) 1993 | Did not qualify | | | | | | |
| (Qatar) 1995 | Did not qualify | | | | | | |
| (Malaysia) 1997 | Did not qualify | | | | | | |
| (Nigeria) 1999 | Did not qualify | | | | | | |
| (Argentina) 2001 | Did not qualify | | | | | | |
| (United Arab Emirates) 2003 | Did not qualify | | | | | | |
| (Netherlands) 2005 | Did not qualify | | | | | | |
| (Canada) 2007 | Did not qualify | | | | | | |
| (Egypt) 2009 | Did not qualify | | | | | | |
| (Colombia) 2011 | Did not qualify | | | | | | |
| (Turkey) 2013 | Did not qualify | | | | | | |
| (New Zealand) 2015 | Did not qualify | | | | | | |
| (South Korea) 2017 | Did not qualify | | | | | | |
| (Poland) 2019 | Did not qualify | | | | | | |
| (Argentina) 2023 | Did not qualify | | | | | | |
| (Chile) 2025 | Did not qualify | | | | | | |
| (Azerbaijan) (Uzbekistan) 2027 | to be determined | | | | | | |
| Total | 0/25 | 0 | 0 | 0 | 0 | 0 | 0 |

^{1}Draws include knockout matches decided on penalty kicks.

== Current squad ==
The following players were called up for the 2025 U-20 Africa Cup of Nations between 27 April – 18 May 2025.

Caps and goals correct as of 30 April 2025, after the match against Egypt.

| No. | Pos. | Player | Date of birth (age) | Caps | Goals | Club |
|---|---|---|---|---|---|---|
| 1 | GK | Dauda Bangura | 16 October 2006 (age 20) | 0 | 0 | (Sierra Leone Football Association) East End Lions |
| 16 | GK | Mohamed Kargbo | 1 January 2005 (age 21) | 0 | 0 | (Sierra Leone Football Association) Old Edwardians |
| 23 | GK | Mamadou Jalloh | 29 November 2006 (age 19) | 3 | 0 | (Danish Football Association) Brøndby |
| 3 | DF | Saidu Musa Bangura | 11 November 2005 (age 21) | 2 | 0 | (Sierra Leone Football Association) East End Lions |
| 14 | DF | Mohamed Bai Kamara | 10 January 2005 (age 21) | 1 | 0 | (Latvian Football Federation) Metta |
| 15 | DF | Citta Bah | 27 April 2006 (age 20) | 1 | 0 | (Sierra Leone Football Association) Star Sport |
| 18 | DF | Nathaniel Jalloh | 7 September 2005 (age 21) | 2 | 0 | (Sierra Leone Football Association) Kallon |
| 25 | DF | Abraham Kanu | 3 July 2005 (age 21) | 1 | 0 | (The Football Association) Reading |
| 2 | MF | Alusine Dumbuya | Unknown | 1 | 0 | (Sierra Leone Football Association) East End Lions |
| 4 | MF | Alpha Turay | 26 May 2005 (age 21) | 2 | 0 | (Football Association of Serbia) Dubočica |
| 5 | MF | Alpha Kabia | 22 November 2005 (age 20) | 2 | 0 | (United States Soccer Federation) Minnesota United |
| 6 | MF | Musa Bangura | 1 January 2009 (age 17) | 0 | 0 | (Sierra Leone Football Association) Old Edwardians |
| 7 | MF | Mohamed Fofanah | 30 August 2005 (age 21) | 1 | 0 | (Sierra Leone Football Association) East End Lions |
| 8 | MF | Sallieu Bah | 10 September 2006 (age 20) | 2 | 1 | (Sierra Leone Football Association) Wilberforce Strikers |
| 10 | MF | Momoh Kamara | 6 May 2005 (age 21) | 3 | 3 | Unknown |
| 12 | MF | Mohamed Koroma | 1 January 2006 (age 20) | 0 | 0 | Unknown |
| 13 | MF | Amara Keita | 8 August 2005 (age 21) | 2 | 0 | Free agent |
| 17 | MF | Sheku Kallon | Unknown | 0 | 0 | (Sierra Leone Football Association) Wilberforce Strikers |
| 19 | MF | Santigie Fornah | 1 February 2007 (age 19) | 2 | 0 | (Sierra Leone Football Association) Freetonias SLIFA |
| 20 | MF | Samba Juma Bah | 5 May 2006 (age 20) | 1 | 0 | (Sierra Leone Football Association) Diamond Stars |
| 26 | MF | Abubakar Sheriff | Unknown | 0 | 0 | (Sierra Leone Football Association) Luawa |
| 9 | FW | Sulaiman Sheriff Kargbo | 23 April 2005 (age 21) | 2 | 0 | (Sierra Leone Football Association) East End Lions |
| 11 | FW | Abdul Bangura | 1 December 2005 (age 20) | 1 | 0 | (Latvian Football Federation) Metta |
| 21 | FW | Samuel Gandi | 19 October 2006 (age 20) | 3 | 0 | (Sierra Leone Football Association) Old Edwardians |
| 22 | FW | Kelvin Kargbo | Unknown | 2 | 0 | (The Football Association) AFC Wimbledon |
| 24 | FW | Osman Kamara | 6 August 2006 (age 20) | 1 | 0 | (The Football Association) Arsenal |

== See also ==
- Sierra Leone national football team
- Sierra Leone national under-17 football team
