= Mamadou Jalloh =

Danish-born Sierra Leonean footballer (born 2006)

Personal information
- Full name: Mamadou Wurie Jalloh
- Date of birth: 29 November 2006 (age 19)
- Place of birth: Denmark
- Height: 1.85 m (6 ft 1 in)
- Position: Goalkeeper

Team information
- Current team: VPS (on loan from Brøndby IF)
- Number: 41

Youth career
- –2023: AC Amager Academy
- 2023–2025: Brøndby IF

Senior career*
Years	Team	Apps	(Gls)
2025–	Brøndby IF	0	(0)
2025–	→ VPS (loan)	36	(0)
2025	→ VPS Akatemia (loan)	1	(0)

International career^{‡}
2025–	Sierra Leone U20	5	(0)
2026–	Sierra Leone	3	(0)
- * Club domestic league appearances and goals as of 21:09, 15 November 2026 (UTC) ‡ National team caps and goals as of 21:09, 15 November 2026 (UTC)

Mamadou Wurie Jalloh (born 29 November 2006) is a footballer who plays as a goalkeeper for Veikkausliiga side Vaasan Palloseura, on loan from Brøndby IF. Born in Denmark, he represents the Sierra Leone national team.

== Club career ==
Jalloh started his youth career at AC Amager Academy, before joining the academy of Brøndby in 2023. In the summer of 2025, Jalloh extended his contract with Brøndby until the summer of 2028, while also joining Vaasan Palloseura on loan for the remainder of the 2025 Veikkausliiga season. On 22 November, his loan was extended until the end of the 2026 season.

Following the 2026 season, Jalloh was named VPS's Player of the Year.

== International career ==
In 2025, Jalloh was called up to the Sierra Leone under-20 national team at the 2025 U-20 Africa Cup of Nations, where he only conceded two goals as they lost in the quarter-finals against Morocco. He made his debut for the Sierra Leone national team on 30 March 2026, in a penalty shootout defeat to Azerbaijan in the 2026 FIFA Series.

== Personal life ==
Born in Denmark, Jalloh's father is from Sierra Leone.
