= Ilias Boumassaoudi =

Moroccan footballer (born 2005)

Personal information
- Date of birth: 14 January 2005 (age 21)
- Place of birth: Eindhoven, Netherlands
- Height: 1.82 m (6 ft 0 in)
- Position: Midfielder

Team information
- Current team: Den Bosch
- Number: 40

Youth career
- PSV Eindhoven
- NAC Breda
- –2023: Den Bosch

Senior career*
Years	Team	Apps	(Gls)
2023–	Den Bosch	69	(15)

International career^{‡}
2023–	Morocco U20	14	(5)
Medal record
Men's football
Representing Morocco
FIFA U-20 World Cup
Winner	2025 Chile
- * Club domestic league appearances and goals as of 25 April 2026 ‡ National team caps and goals as of 01:19, 2 October 2025 (UTC)

Ilias Boumassaoudi (born 14 January 2005) is a professional footballer who plays as a midfielder for Eerste Divisie club FC Den Bosch. Born in the Netherlands, he plays for Morocco at youth international level.

== Club career ==
Boumassaoudi was in the youth systems at PSV Eindhoven and NAC Breda, prior to joining FC Den Bosch at the age of 14.

He signed his first professional contract with the club in April 2023. Boumassaoudi made his professional debut for the club on 8 May 2023, in the Eerste Divisie in an away match against Jong FC Utrecht, in a 0–0 draw. He made his first start four days later, and marked the occasion with his first professional goal, in a 2–2 draw. In August 2025, he scored a hat-trick in a 5–2 win over TOP Oss. The following month, he signed a new two-year contract extension with the club.

== International career ==
Boumassaoudi played for the Morocco national under-20 team at the 2025 African U-20 Cup of Nations, scoring an extra-time winner in a 1–0 win over Sierra Leone in the quarter-finals to ensure Morocco qualified for the 2025 U-20 World Cup. He was subsequently named in the squad for the 2025 FIFA U-20 World Cup held from 27 September to 19 October in Chile.

== Honours ==
Morocco U20

- FIFA U-20 World Cup: 2025
