= Younes El Hannach =

French footballer (born 2004)

Personal information
- Full name: Younes Mohamed El Hannach
- Date of birth: 4 June 2004 (age 22)
- Place of birth: Poissy, France
- Position: Defender

Team information
- Current team: Al Sadd (on loan from Al Shamal)
- Number: 3

Youth career
- 2010–2012: AS Carrières Grésillons
- 2012–2023: Paris Saint-Germain

Senior career*
Years	Team	Apps	(Gls)
2023–	Al Shamal	49	(2)
2026–	→ Al Sadd (loan)	0	(0)

International career
2022	France U18	5	(0)
2022–2023	France U19	6	(0)
Medal record
Men's football
Representing France
Mediterranean Games
Gold medal – first place	2022 Oran	Team
- * Club domestic league appearances and goals as of 28 April 2024

Younes Mohamed El Hannach (Arabic: يونس الحناش; born 4 June 2004) is a French professional footballer who plays as a defender for Qatar Stars League club Al Sadd, on loan from Al Shamal.

== Early life ==
As a youth player, El Hannach joined the youth academy of Ligue 1 side Paris Saint-Germain. He was regarded as one of the club's most important youth players.

== Club career ==
In 2023, El Hannach signed for Qatari side Al Shamal. On 27 August 2023, he debuted for the club during a 2–2 draw with Al Wakrah.

== International career ==
Born in France, El Hannach is of Moroccan descent. He has been called up to represent Morocco at youth international level. In May 2022, El Hannach was called up to the France squad for the 2022 Mediterranean Games.

== Style of play ==
El Hannach mainly operates as a defender. He has been described as "good ability to bring the ball around... solid... in duels... very powerful... in the air".

== Personal life ==
El Hannach was born in 2004 in France. He grew up in Yvelines, France. His younger brothers Idriss and Naoufel are also footballers.

== Honours ==
France U18

- Mediterranean Games gold medal: 2022
