= DR Congo national under-20 football team =

National under-20 association football team representing DR Congo

- Nickname: Small Leopards
- Association: Congolese Association Football Federation
- Confederation: CAF (Africa)
- Sub-confederation: UNIFFAC (Central Africa)
- FIFA code: COD
First colours	Second colours

First international
- Angola 2–1 Zaire (Luanda, Angola; 30 April 1988)

Biggest win
- DR Congo 4–1 Cameroon (Kinshasa, RD Congo; 12 August 2013)

Biggest defeat
- DR Congo 1–4 Central African Republic (Kinshasa, RD Congo; 2 May 2010); Congo 3–0 DR Congo (Brazzaville, Congo; 14 December 2022)

U-20 Africa Cup of Nations
- Appearances: 2 (first in 1989)
- Best result: Group stage (2013)

FIFA U-20 World Cup
- Appearances: None

Congo DR U-20 national football team, also known as Congo DR Under-20s or nicknamed Small Leopards, is the youth team for football in Congo DR. It plays a large role in the development of Congolaise football, and is considered to be the feeder team for the Congo DR national football team and is controlled by the Congolese Association Football Federation.

== Competitive record ==
=== FIFA U-20 World Cup record ===
FIFA U-20 World Cup record
Year	Round	GP	W	D^{1}	L	GS	GA
(Tunisia) 1977	Did not qualify						
(Japan) 1979	Did not qualify						
(Australia) 1981	Did not qualify						
(Mexico) 1983	Did not qualify						
(Soviet Union) 1985	Did not qualify						
(Chile) 1987	Did not qualify						
(Saudi Arabia) 1989	Did not qualify						
(Portugal) 1991	Did not qualify						
(Australia) 1993	Did not qualify						
(Qatar) 1995	Did not qualify						
(Malaysia) 1997	Did not qualify						
(Nigeria) 1999	Did not qualify						
(Argentina) 2001	Did not qualify						
(United Arab Emirates) 2003	Did not qualify						
(Netherlands) 2005	Did not qualify						
(Canada) 2007	Did not qualify						
(Egypt) 2009	Did not qualify						
(Colombia) 2011	Did not qualify						
(Turkey) 2013	Did not qualify						
(New Zealand) 2015	Did not qualify						
(South Korea) 2017	Did not qualify						
(Poland) 2019	Did not qualify						
(Argentina) 2023	Did not qualify						
(Chile) 2025	Did not qualify						
(Azerbaijan) (Uzbekistan) 2027	to be determined						
Total	0/25	0	0	0	0	0	0

^{1}Draws include knockout matches decided on penalty kicks.

== Current squad ==
The following players were called up for the 2025 U-20 Africa Cup of Nations between 27 April – 18 May 2025.

Caps and goals correct as of 5 May 2025, after the match against Central African Republic

No.	Pos.	Player	Date of birth (age)	Caps	Goals	Club
1	GK	Ike Utshudi		0	0	(Congolese Association Football Federation) Don Bosco
16	GK	Yohann Bopaka	10 January 2006 (age 20)	0	0	(Swiss Football Association) Basel
21	GK	Ryan Tutu Mayangila	1 April 2005 (age 21)	4	0	(French Football Federation) Strasbourg
2	DF	David Mukandila		2	0	(Congolese Association Football Federation) Les Anges
3	DF	Merdi Ngonda		0	0	(French Football Federation) Sochaux
5	DF	Frédéric Efuele Ngoyala	20 February 2005 (age 21)	5	0	(French Football Federation) Toulouse
18	DF	Dieu Kalonji		2	0	(Congolese Association Football Federation) Céleste
19	DF	Daniel Tshilanda Kabongo	27 April 2006 (age 20)	2	0	(Royal Belgian Football Association) Union SG
20	DF	Landry Soko		2	0	(Congolese Association Football Federation) Les Aigles du Congo
4	MF	Cédrick Salumu		0	0	(Congolese Association Football Federation) Dauphins Noirs
6	MF	Jules Ahoka		2	0	(Royal Belgian Football Association) Antwerp
7	MF	Ibrahim Matobo	5 December 2005 (age 20)	3	0	(Congolese Association Football Federation) Les Aigles du Congo
8	MF	Kevin Makoko		1	0	(Congolese Association Football Federation) Vita
10	MF	Messy Manitu	5 January 2006 (age 20)	3	0	(French Football Federation) Amiens
12	MF	Dieu Lukombe		1	0	(Congolese Association Football Federation) Vita
14	MF	Eugène Idumbo		0	0	(Congolese Association Football Federation) Les Aigles du Congo
15	MF	Honoré Bayanginisa	27 April 2005 (age 21)	1	0	(French Football Federation) Sochaux
22	MF	Noah Makanza	14 January 2005 (age 21)	2	2	(Royal Belgian Football Association) Mechelen
23	MF	Grady Katungulu		1	0	(Congolese Association Football Federation) Anges Verts
25	MF	Faveurdi Bongeli	21 March 2007 (age 19)	2	0	(Congolese Association Football Federation) Mazembe
9	FW	Samuel Ntanda-Lukisa	30 June 2005 (age 21)	4	2	(Italian Football Federation) Sampdoria
13	FW	Meschack Tshimanga	19 December 2005 (age 20)	2	0	(Congolese Association Football Federation) Mazembe
17	FW	Tonny Talasi		2	0	(Congolese Association Football Federation) Anges Verts
24	FW	Isaac Lufuiku	26 June 2006 (age 20)	2	0	(French Football Federation) Caen
