= Naoufel El Hannach =

Footballer (born 2006)

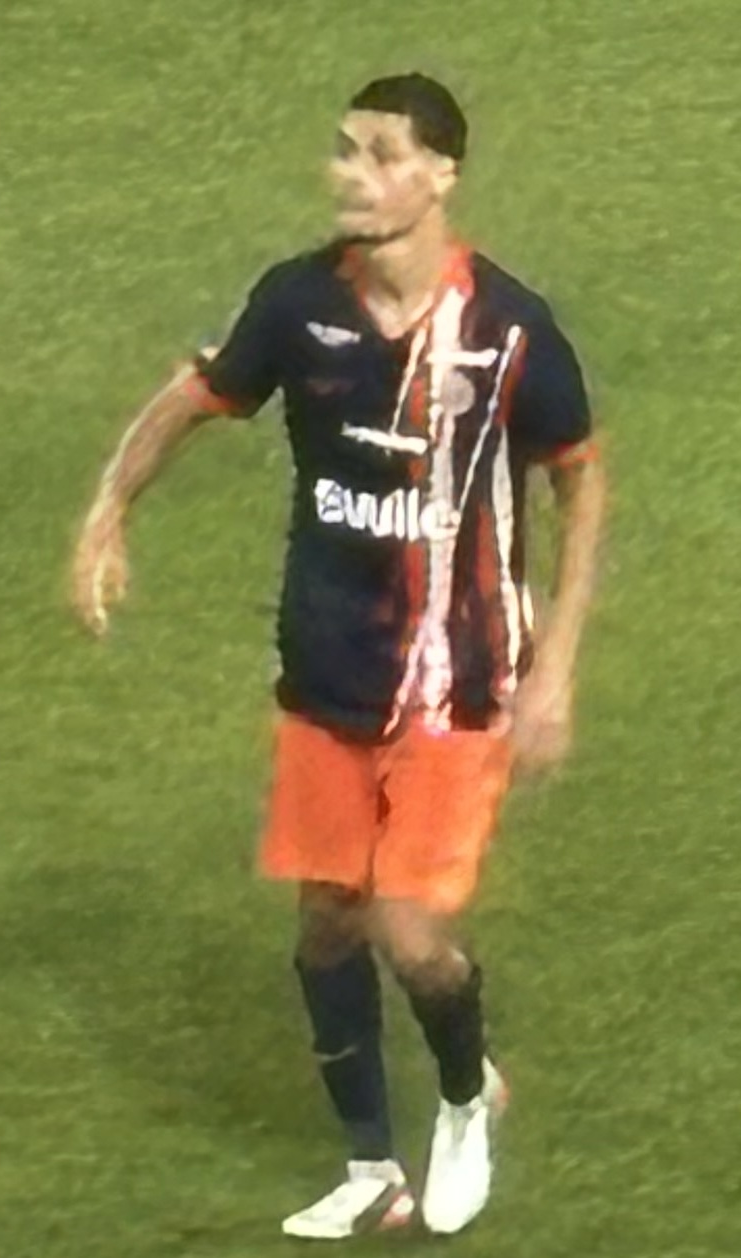
- El Hannach with Montpellier in August 2026

Personal information
- Date of birth: 7 December 2006 (age 19)
- Place of birth: Poissy, France
- Height: 1.83 m (6 ft 0 in)
- Position: Defender

Team information
- Current team: Montpellier (on loan from Paris Saint-Germain)
- Number: 3

Youth career
- 2013–2025: Paris Saint-Germain

Senior career*
Years	Team	Apps	(Gls)
2025–	Paris Saint-Germain	0	(0)
2025–	→ Montpellier (loan)	19	(0)

International career^{‡}
2023	Morocco U17	6	(0)
2024	Morocco U18	3	(1)
2024–	Morocco U20	5	(1)
- * Club domestic league appearances and goals as of 11 May 2026 ‡ National team caps and goals as of 22:34, 26 June 2025 (UTC)

Naoufel El Hannach (Arabic: نوفل الحناش; born 7 December 2006) is a professional footballer who plays as a defender for Ligue 2 club Montpellier, on loan from Ligue 1 club Paris Saint-Germain. Born in France, he is a Morocco youth international.

== Career ==
In 2013, El Hannach joined the youth academy of Ligue 1 club Paris Saint-Germain (PSG). During the 2023–24 season, he was regarded as one of the key players in the club's under-19 team. On 7 February 2025, El Hannach signed his first professional contract with PSG, a deal until 2027. On 26 June 2025, he was loaned out to Montpellier for the 2025–26 season. He returned to Montpellier on a second loan for the 2026–27 season.

== Style of play ==
El Hannach plays as a right-back and as a centre-back. Right-footed, he is known for his speed.

== Personal life ==
El Hannach is the younger brother of footballers Younes and Idriss.

== Honours ==
Paris Saint-Germain U19

- Championnat National U19: 2023–24, 2024–25

Morocco U20

- U-20 Africa Cup of Nations runner-up: 2025
