= SOS FC de Gbangouma =

SOS
- Full name: SOS FC de Gbangouma
- Founded: 2005
- Ground: Athletics Field
- Capacity: 2,000
- Chairman: ?
- Manager: ?
- League: Central African Republic League

SOS FC de Gbangouma is a football (soccer) club from Central African Republic based in Bangui. The team plays in the Central African Republic League.

The club was founded in 2005.

== Stadium ==
Currently, the team plays at the 2,000-capacity Athletics Field in Bangui, which is located next to the Barthélemy Boganda Stadium.
