= Lawrence Ouma =

Kenyan professional footballer

Personal information
- Full name: Lawrence Okoth Ouma
- Date of birth: 10 July 2005 (age 21)
- Place of birth: Rachuonyo, Kenya
- Height: 1.93 m (6 ft 4 in)
- Position: Centre forward

Team information
- Current team: Bandari FC
- Number: 14

Senior career*
Years	Team	Apps	(Gls)
2023–2024	Vihiga Bullets	?	(?)
2024–2025	MOFA	?	(?)
2025–2026	SJK Akatemia	14	(1)
2025–2026	SJK	0	(0)
2026-	Bandari FC	0	(0)

International career^{‡}
2025–	Kenya	5	(2)
- * Club domestic league appearances and goals as of 7 June 2026 ‡ National team caps and goals as of 7 June 2026

Lawrence Okoth Ouma is a Kenyan professional footballer who plays as a striker for Kenya premier league club Bandari and the Kenya national team.

== Club career ==
Ouma turned out for Vihiga Bullets during the 2023 season before joining Michael Olunga Football Academy (MOFA) in the National Super League in 2024. In September 2025, he joined Finnish top-tier side SJK. He never played any minutes for the senior team, he made a couples of appearances and scored for SJK Akatemia.

He left SJK and currently plays for Bandari United Football Club as of September 2026.

== International career ==
While at MOFA, Ouma selection to Kenya's U20 national team. He featured in regional tournaments such as the 2024 CECAFA U-20 Championship, and was part of Kenya's squad at the 2025 U-20 Africa Cup of Nations staged in Cairo in May 2025.

At the 2025 U-20 AFCON in Egypt, Ouma scored twice for Kenya - in the group opener against Morocco and against Tunisia.

=== International goals ===
Scores and results list Kenya goal tally first, score column indicates score after each Ouma goal

List of international goals scored by Lawrence Ouma
No.	Date	Venue	Opponent	Score	Result	Competition
1	7 June 2026	Lucas Moripe Stadium, Pretoria, South Africa	Lesotho	3–0	4–0	Friendly
2	7 June 2026	Lucas Moripe Stadium, Pretoria, South Africa	Lesotho	4–0	4–0	Friendly
