= Tylon Smith =

South African soccer player (born 2005)

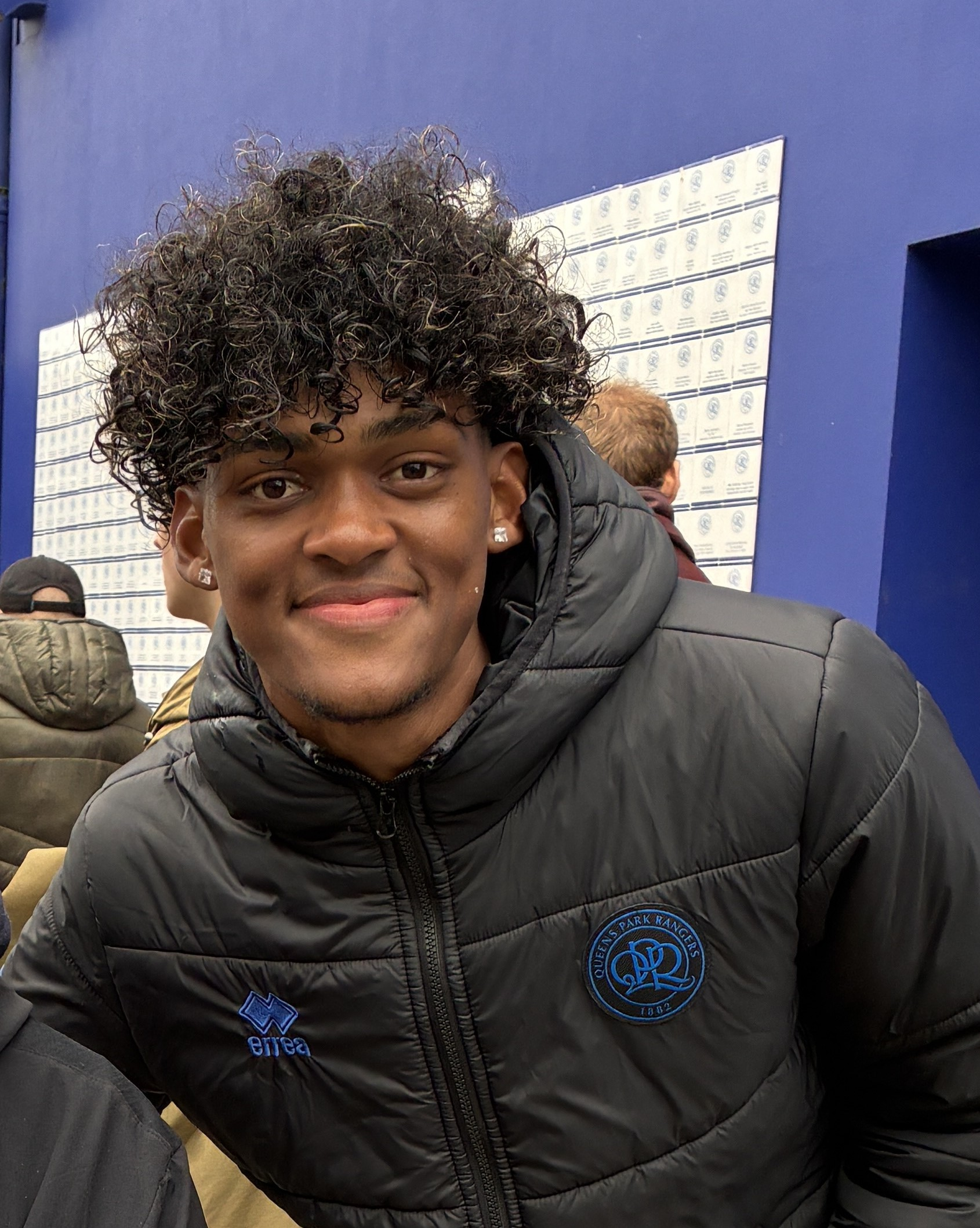
- Smith in 2026

Personal information
- Full name: Tylon Christopher Smith
- Date of birth: 9 May 2005 (age 21)
- Place of birth: Kriefgat, Western Cape, South Africa
- Height: 1.82 m (6 ft 0 in)
- Position: Centre-back

Team information
- Current team: New England Revolution
- Number: 6

Youth career
- –2024: Stellenbosch

Senior career*
Years	Team	Apps	(Gls)
2024–2025	Stellenbosch		
2025–	Queens Park Rangers	2	(0)
2026–	→ New England Revolution (loan)	0	(0)
2026–	→ New England Revolution II (loan)	1	(0)

International career
2024–2025	South Africa U20	11	(1)
2025–	South Africa	1	(0)
Medal record
Representing South Africa
Africa U-20 Cup of Nations
Winner	2025
- * Club domestic league appearances and goals

Tylon Christopher Smith (born 9 May 2005) is a South African professional soccer player who plays as a centre-back for Major League Soccer club New England Revolution, on loan from EFL Championship side Queens Park Rangers, and the South Africa national team.

Smith was voted player of the tournament at the 2025 U-20 Africa Cup of Nations.

== Club career ==
=== Stellenbosch ===
Smith played for Stellenbosch in the PSL Reserve League and was part of the team that won the league in the 2023/24 season. He was also part of the team that won the Next Gen Cup following a 2–0 win over Tottenham Hotspur U/21.

In October 2024 he signed his first professional contract with the side.

=== Queens Park Rangers ===
In July 2025, Smith signed with EFL Championship side Queens Park Rangers on a four-year deal. The move saw him become the first player since Kagisho Dikgacoi in 2009 to transfer directly from the PSL to England, also becoming the first player to progress through the Stellenbosch academy and secure a move abroad.

On 12 August 2025, he made his debut in a 3–2 EFL Cup defeat to Plymouth Argyle.

==== Loan to New England Revolution ====
On 13 August 2026 Smith was loaned to the New England Revolution of Major League Soccer.

== International career ==
Smith competed with the South Africa U-20 team at the 2024 COSAFA U-20 Cup when the side won their ninth title and qualified for the 2025 U-20 Arica Cup of Nations. He helped the side win their maiden U-20 Africa Cup of Nations and qualify for the 2025 U-20 FIFA World Cup in 2025. He was voted the 2025 U-20 Arica Cup of Nations player of the tournament. He was nominated for the CAF Young Player of the Year at the 2025 awards.

Smith was called up for the South Africa senior side by coach Hugo Broos for the 2025 Africa Cup of Nations.

== Honours ==
=== Club ===
Queens Park Rangers Development Squad

- London Senior Cup champions: 2025–26

Stellenbosch

- PSL Reserve League: 2023/24, Runners-Up: 2024/25
- Next Gen Cup: 2024

=== International ===
South Africa U-20

- U-20 Africa Cup of Nations: 2025
- COSAFA U-20 Challenge Cup: 2024

=== Individual ===
- 2025 U-20 Africa Cup of Nations: Player of the Tournament
- 2024/25 PSL Reserve League: Player of the Season
