= Farès Bousnina =

Tunisian footballer

Personal information
- Date of birth: 13 February 2006 (age 20)
- Place of birth: La Seyne-sur-Mer, France
- Height: 1.83 m (6 ft 0 in)
- Position: Forward

Team information
- Current team: Bologna (U20)

Youth career
- 2011–2019: EFC Seynois
- 2019–2021: Gardia FC
- 2021–2024: Nice
- 2025–: Bologna

Senior career*
Years	Team	Apps	(Gls)
2024–2025	Nice	0	(0)

International career^{‡}
2021	France U16	3	(0)
2025–	Tunisia U20	3	(1)
- * Club domestic league appearances and goals as of 17:02, 2 September 2025 (UTC) ‡ National team caps and goals as of 17:02, 2 September 2025 (UTC)

Farès Bousnina (Arabic: فارس بوسنينة; born 13 February 2006) is a professional footballer who plays as a forward for the Under-20 squad of Serie A club Bologna. Born in France, he is a youth international for Tunisia.

== Club career ==
Bousnina is a product of the youth academies of the French clubs EFC Seynois, Gardia FC and Nice. He made his senior and professional debut with Nice as a substitute in a 2–1 UEFA Europa League loss to Union SG on 12 December 2024. On 20 August 2025, he transferred to the Italian Serie A club Bologna. He signed a two-year contract and was assigned to their Under-20 team.

== International career ==
Born in France to Tunisian parents, Bousnina holds dual French-Tunisian citizenship. In 2021, he made 3 appearances for the France U16s in friendlies. He was called up to the Tunisia U20s for the 2025 U-20 Africa Cup of Nations. In September 2025 he was called up to the Tunisia A' national team for a set of friendlies.
