= Alieu Badara Saja Taal =

Gambian academic and politician

Alieu Badara Saja Taal (March 22, 1944 – April 2, 2014) was a Gambian academic and politician.

Taal was born in Banjul. He completed his high school education at Methodist High School before receiving his B.A.(hons) and M.A. degrees at the University of New England, Australia and a PhD at Massey University, New Zealand. After completing his education, Taal went into politics, becoming a permanent secretary in the Ministry of Tourism, Office of the President, and Ministry of Education.

Taal lectured in the areas of political science, management, public administration and tourism at the University of the Gambia. He published several academic papers, such as the influential "Pan-Africanism - An African liberation ideology against the domination of Africans by Whites".

From 2005 to 2007 Taal was the managing director of The Daily Observer. It was during his term as director that journalist Ebrima Manneh disappeared without a trace. Taal provided criticism for refusing to comment on the matter. His house was robbed in 2011.

Taal died on April 2, 2014, in Dakar, Senegal. The cause of death was a liver infection.
