= Fletcher Smythe-Lowe =

South African soccer player (born 2007)

Personal information
- Full name: Fletcher Hani Smythe-Lowe
- Date of birth: February 2, 2007 (age 19)
- Place of birth: Cape Town, South Africa
- Height: 1.87 m (6 ft 2 in)
- Position: Goalkeeper

Team information
- Current team: Estoril
- Number: 98

Youth career
- Ubuntu Football Academy
- –2022: Oeiras
- 2022–2023: Alverca
- 2023–2024: Benfica
- 2024–: Estoril

International career^{‡}
Years	Team	Apps	(Gls)
2024–	South Africa U20	10	(0)
Medal record
Representing South Africa
Africa U-20 Cup of Nations
Winner	2025
- ‡ National team caps and goals as of 5 October 2025

Fletcher Hani Smythe-Lowe (born 2 February 2007) is a South African soccer player who plays as a goalkeeper for Primeira Liga club Estoril.

Smythe-Lowe was named goalkeeper of the tournament at the 2025 U-20 Africa Cup of Nations.

== Early life ==
Smythe-Lowe was born on 2 February 2007 in Cape Town. Growing up, he supported South African side Kaizer Chiefs.

== Youth career ==
As a youth player, Smythe-Lowe started his career at Ubuntu Football Academy in Cape Town. From there he joined the youth academy of Portuguese side Oeiras. Following his stint there, he joined the youth academy of Portuguese side Alverca.

Ahead of the 2023–24 season, he joined the youth academy of Portuguese side Benfica. Subsequently, he joined the youth academy of Portuguese side Estoril.

== International career ==
Smythe-Lowe is a South Africa youth international. He competed at the 2024 COSAFA U-20 Cup where he was named goalkeeper of the tournament.

During April and May 2025, he played for the South Africa national under-20 soccer team at the 2025 U-20 Africa Cup of Nations where he was named goalkeeper of the tournament and man of the match at the final.

== Honours ==
South Africa U-20

- U-20 Africa Cup of Nations: 2025
- COSAFA U-20 Cup: 2024

Individual

- 2024 COSAFA U-20 Cup: Goalkeeper of the Tournament
- 2025 U-20 Africa Cup of Nations: Goalkeeper of the Tournament
