= Momoh Kamara =

Sierra Leonean footballer (born 2005)

Personal information
- Date of birth: 6 May 2005 (age 21)
- Place of birth: Kambia, Sierra Leone
- Height: 1.70 m (5 ft 7 in)
- Position: Midfielder

Team information
- Current team: IF Elfsborg
- Number: 29

Youth career
- 2017–2022: Mattia FC
- 2022–2023: Diamond Stars
- 2023: Ladegbuwa

Senior career*
Years	Team	Apps	(Gls)
2023–2025	Leixões S.C.	2	(1)
2025–2025	Mattia FC	0	(0)
2025	→ Minnesota United 2 (loan)	16	(4)
2026–	IF Elfsborg	8	(0)

International career^{‡}
2024–	Sierra Leone U20	5	(4)
2025–	Sierra Leone	6	(1)
- * Club domestic league appearances and goals as of 8 July 2026 ‡ National team caps and goals as of 20:00, 9 September 2025 (UTC)

Momoh Ibrahim Kamara (born 6 May 2005) is a Sierra Leonean professional footballer who plays as a midfielder for Swedish club IF Elfsborg, on loan from Sierra Leonean side Mattia FC. He represents Sierra Leone at international level.

== Club career ==
Momoh Ibrahim Kamara grew up in Sierra Leone where he was trained by the Mattia Football Club team playing midfielder. He joined the Diamond Stars Football Club still in Sierra Leone for a year before leaving for Nigeria to Ladegbuwa FC. He was called up to the U20 selection to play in the 2025 U-20 Africa Cup of Nations qualifiers. It was during this competition that he became known by scoring four goals in five matches, failing in the final. He qualified his team for the 2025 Africa Cup of Nations Under-20 for the first time, and finished as co-top scorer and best player of the competition.

At the 2025 Africa Cup of Nations for the Under-20s, he repeated his feat by scoring a hat-trick against Egypt, the host country in the group stage. Then he scored another goal against South Africa. He was twice elected man of the match. His selection failed in the quarter-finals against Morocco, in added time. He finished as the competition's top scorer. He is the first Sierra Leonean player to achieve this feat.

He was recruited in 2025 by the Leixões Sport Club SC club in Portugal, without ever managing to join the first team.

He returned to his home country of Sierra Leone, where he joined his former club, Mattia Football Club, before being loaned to Minnesota United FC 2, where he joined the reserve team, where he played in MLS Next Pro. He scored his first goal on June 29, 2025, in his second match, coming on as a substitute in the 69th minute.

In 2025, he was called up to participate in the African Zone Qualifiers for the 2026 FIFA World Cup. He entered the game for the first time on March 20, 2025, providing an assist, winning the match 3 goals to 1.

On 25 March 2026, he moved to Swedish club IF Elfsborg on loan.

== Career statistics ==
=== Club ===
Appearances and goals by club, season and competition
Club	Season	League		National cup		Other		Total		
Club	Season	Division	Apps	Goals	Apps	Goals	Apps	Goals	Apps	Goals
Minnesota United II	2025	MLS Next Pro	10	3	0	0	—		0	0
Career total			10	3	0	0	0	0	0	0

=== International ===
As of matches played 9 September 2025.

National team	Year	Apps	Goals
Sierra Leone
Sierra Leone	2025	4	1
Total		4	1

Scores and results list Sierra Leone's goal tally first, score column indicates score after each Kamara goal.

List of international goals scored by Momoh Kamara
No.	Date	Venue	Opponent	Score	Result	Competition
1	9 September 2025	Samuel Kanyon Doe Sports Complex, Monrovia, Liberia	Ethiopia	1–0	2–0	2026 FIFA World Cup qualification

== Honours ==
- 2025 U-20 Africa Cup of Nations Top Scorer
- 2025 U-20 Africa Cup of Nations XI All Star Team
