= Central Parade F.C. =

Central Parade
- Full name: Central Parade FC
- Nickname: Seidya Boys
- Founded: 2006; 20 years ago
- Ground: Parade Football Ground; Freetown, Sierra Leone
- Chairman: (Sierra Leone) Mohamed Alie Barrie
- Manager: (Sierra Leone) Foday Turay
- Coach: (Sierra Leone) Bobson Seasay
- League: Sierra Leone National Premier League
- 2025–2026: 10th

Central Parade formerly Cenegal FC, is a Sierra Leonean football club from the capital Freetown, Sierra Leone currently a member of the Sierra Leone National Premier League which is the top football division in Sierra Leone. Sport Director is Noel Kitami Horton.

== Performance in CAF competitions ==
- CAF Confederation Cup: 1 appearance

2010 – Preliminary Round

== Notable players ==
- (Sierra Leone) Lamin "Obreh" Conteh
- (Sierra Leone) Mumini Khomson Kamara

== Notable coaches ==
- (Ghana) Derrick Boison
- (Sierra Leone) Abdulia Bah
- (Sierra Leone) AD Koroma
