= Kparobo Arierhi =

Nigerian footballer

Personal information
- Full name: Kparobo Nathaniel Arierhi
- Date of birth: 11 January 2007 (age 19)
- Height: 1.75 m (5 ft 9 in)
- Position: Striker

Team information
- Current team: Sogndal (on loan from Lillestrøm)
- Number: 9

Senior career*
Years	Team	Apps	(Gls)
–2025	Beyond Limits	15	(22)
2025–	Lillestrøm	13	(1)
2025	→ Mjøndalen (loan)	14	(4)
2026–	→ Sogndal (loan)	13	(7)

International career^{‡}
2024–	Nigeria U20	10+	(5)
- * Club domestic league appearances and goals as of 14 November 2026 ‡ National team caps and goals as of 23:44, 13 October 2026 (UTC)

Kparobo Nathaniel Arierhi (born 11 January 2007) is a Nigerian professional footballer who currently plays as a striker for Sogndal, on loan from Lillestrøm.

== Club career ==
Arierhi began his career with Beyond Limits, where he scored 22 goals in 15 matches, as he helped them win the 2023–24 Nigeria National League title, finishing as both the league's top goalscorer and Most Valuable Player. In November 2024, despite interest from French clubs and Aston Villa in England, he signed a pre-contract with Norwegian club Lillestrøm, joining the club in February 2025.

On 17 July 2025, Arierhi joined Norwegian First Division side Mjøndalen on loan. After returning to Lillestrøm, he scored once against rivals Vålerenga in 13 Eliteserien appearances before being loaned out again to Sogndal.

== International career ==
Arirhi made his debut for the Nigeria under-20 national team during 2025 U-20 Africa Cup of Nations qualification, where he scored four goals as Nigeria won the West B Zone and qualified for the 2025 U-20 Africa Cup of Nations in Egypt. He was included in Nigeria's under-20 squad for the 2025 U-20 Africa Cup of Nations, as well as for the 2025 FIFA U-20 World Cup.

== Style of play ==
Arirhi's composure and goal scoring ability has been compared to former Nigerian international footballers Victor Osimhen and Rashidi Yekini.
