= Neo Rapoo =

South African soccer player (born 2005)

Personal information
- Full name: Neo Duncan Rapoo
- Date of birth: 12 August 2005 (age 21)
- Place of birth: Lone Hill, Gauteng, South Africa
- Height: 1.72 m (5 ft 8 in)
- Position: Defender

Team information
- Current team: Orlando Pirates
- Number: 19

Youth career
- 2016–2022: SuperSport United Academy

Senior career*
Years	Team	Apps	(Gls)
2022–2025	SuperSport United	15	(0)
2025–2026	Siwelele F.C.	27	(0)
2026–	Orlando Pirates	4	(0)

International career
2024–2025	South Africa U20	11	(1)
2026–	South Africa U23	2	(0)
- * Club domestic league appearances and goals

Neo Duncan Rapoo (born 12 August 2005) is a South African soccer player who plays as a defender for South African Premiership side Orlando Pirates

== Club career ==
=== SuperSport United ===
Rapoo is a product of the SuperSport United Academy. He was promoted to the senior team at age 17 in 2022.

=== Siwelele F.C. ===
In 2025 SuperSport United was sold to Siwelele and Rapoo was one of the players moved to the new club.

== International career ==
Rapoo competed with the South Africa U-20 team at the 2024 COSAFA U-20 Cup and helped qualify for the 2025 U-20 Africa Cup of Nations.

He helped the side win their maiden U-20 Africa Cup of Nations scoring the second goal in a 4-1 win over Sierra Leone in the group stages. Rapoo played at the 2025 FIFA U-20 World Cup in Chile where the team reached the round of 16.

== Honours ==
South Africa U20

- U-20 Africa Cup of Nations: 2025
- COSAFA U-20 Challenge Cup: 2024
