= Thabang Mahlangu =

South African soccer player (born 2005)

Personal information
- Full name: Thabang Tumelo Ciro Mahlangu
- Date of birth: 31 July 2005 (age 21)
- Place of birth: Sebokeng, South Africa
- Height: 1.80 m (5 ft 11 in)
- Position: Forward

Team information
- Current team: Orbit College F.C. on loan from Siwelele F.C.

Youth career
- 2019–2023: SuperSport United Academy

Senior career*
Years	Team	Apps	(Gls)
2024–2025	SuperSport United		
2025–	Siwelele F.C.		
2026–	→ Orbit College F.C.(loan)		

International career
2020–2022	South Africa U17	3	(3)
2023–2025	South Africa U20	7	(3)
- * Club domestic league appearances and goals

Thabang Tumelo Ciro Mahlangu (born 31 July 2005) is a South African soccer player who plays as a forward for South African Premiership side Orbit College.

== Club career ==
=== SuperSport United ===
Mahlangu played for SuperSport United in the PSL Reserve League and was part of the team that won the league in the 2022–23 season.

He was the 84th academy graduate to debut for the senior side in 2024.

=== Siwelele ===
In 2025 SuperSport United was sold to Siwelele and Mahlangu was one of the players moved to the new club.

==== Orbit College ====
He joined Orbit College on loan in the January 2026 transfer window.

== International career ==
Mahlangu competed with the South Africa U-17 team at the 2020 COSAFA U17 when the team won their third title scoring three goals.

In 2024 he competed with the South Africa U-20 at the 2024 COSAFA U-20 Cup and helped the team qualify for the 2025 U-20 Africa Cup of Nations.

He helped the side win their maiden U-20 Africa Cup of Nations. He scored the winning goal in the quarterfinal match against DR Congo in extra time to send the team to the semifinals and qualify for the 2025 U-20 FIFA World Cup.

== Honours ==
South Africa U20

- U-20 Africa Cup of Nations: 2025
- COSAFA U-20 Challenge Cup: 2024

South Africa U17

- COSAFA U-17 Challenge Cup: 2020

SuperSport United

- PSL Reserve: 2022–23
