= 2024–25 Smouha SC season =

Smouha
2024–25 season
- Manager: Ahmed Samy
- Stadium: Alexandria Stadium
- Egyptian Premier League: 12th
- Egypt Cup: Quarter-finals
- Egyptian League Cup: Group stage
- All statistics correct as of 17 January 2025.

The 2024–25 season is the 76th season in Smouha SC's history and the 15th consecutive season in the Premier League. In addition to the domestic league, Smouha is set to compete in the domestic cup, and the Egyptian League Cup.

== Transfers ==
=== In ===
Date	Pos.	Player	From	Fee	Ref.
30 June 2024	MF	(Egypt) Ahmed Mostafa	(Saudi Arabia) Al-Okhdood	Loan return	
23 August 2024	MF	(Nigeria) Samuel Amadi	(Egypt) Ceramica Cleopatra	Loan	
8 September 2024	MF	(Egypt) Islam Ateia	(Egypt) Al Masry	Undisclosed	
25 September 2024	MF	(Egypt) Mahmoud Saber	(Egypt) Pyramids	Loan	
30 September 2024	MF	(Morocco) Abdelkabir El Ouadi	(Egypt) Modern Sport	Free	

=== Out ===
Date	Pos.	Player	To	Fee	Ref.
20 August 2024	MF	(Egypt) Ahmed Mostafa	(Egypt) Modern Sport		
1 September 2024	DF	(Egypt) Tarek Alaa	(Egypt) Pyramids	18,000,000 EGP	
13 September 2024	DF	(Egypt) Ahmed Hakam	(Egypt) Ghazl El Mahalla	Loan	

== Friendlies ==
30 September 2024 Friendly	Smouha (Egypt)	1–0	(Egypt) Ghazl El Mahalla

9 October 2024 Friendly	Al Ittihad (Egypt)	v	(Egypt) Smouha	Alexandria
				Stadium: Alexandria Stadium

19 October 2024 Friendly	Smouha (Egypt)	1–0	(Libya) Al-Ahly Benghazi	Cairo

15 November 2024 Friendly	Al Ittihad (Egypt)	1–1	(Egypt) Smouha	Alexandria
14:30 UTC+2	El Deeb	Report	Hassan	Stadium: Alexandria Stadium

19 December 2024 Friendly	Smouha (Egypt)	4–1	(Egypt) Alexandria Sporting	Alexandria
14:00 UTC+2

20 December 2024 Friendly	Smouha (Egypt)	4–0	(Egypt) Olympic Club	Alexandria
14:00 UTC+2		Report

== Competitions ==
=== Overall record ===
Competition	First match	Last match	Starting round	Record							
Competition	First match	Last match	Starting round	Pld	W	D	L	GF	GA	GD	Win %
Egyptian Premier League	30 October 2024	30 May 2025	Matchday 1	8	2	2	4	7	11	−4	25.00
Egypt Cup	4 January 2025		Round of 32	2	2	0	0	2	0	+2	100.00
Egyptian League Cup	11 December 2024		Group stage	1	0	0	1	0	1	−1	0.00
Total				11	4	2	5	9	12	−3	36.36

Last updated: 17 January 2025
Source: Competitions

=== Egyptian Premier League ===
==== League table ====
Pos	Team	Pld	W	D	L	GF	GA	GD	Pts	Qualification or relegation
10	Tala'ea El Gaish	17	5	6	6	13	18	−5	21	Qualification for the relegation play-offs
11	ZED	17	4	9	4	15	13	+2	21	Qualification for the relegation play-offs
12	Smouha	17	6	2	9	13	22	−9	20	Qualification for the relegation play-offs
13	Al Ittihad	17	4	6	7	11	16	−5	18	Qualification for the relegation play-offs
14	Ghazl El Mahalla	17	5	2	10	16	24	−8	17	Qualification for the relegation play-offs

Source: Soccerway (regular season)
Rules for classification: 1) Points; 2) Goal difference; 3) Goals scored.

Pos	Team	Pld	W	D	L	GF	GA	GD	Pts	Qualification
1	Al Ahly (C)	8	6	1	1	22	9	+13	58 (Note: Al Ahly were initially deducted three points for refusing to play their away fixture against Zamalek, scheduled to be played on 11 March 2025. The points deduction was later cancelled by the Egyptian Premier League.)	Qualification for the Champions League first or second round
2	Pyramids	8	4	2	2	15	10	+5	56	Qualification for the Champions League first or second round
3	Zamalek	8	4	3	1	14	6	+8	47	Qualification for the Confederation Cup first or second round
4	Al Masry	8	3	3	2	10	9	+1	42	Qualification for the Confederation Cup first or second round
5	National Bank of Egypt SC	8	2	3	3	13	12	+1	38	
6	Ceramica Cleopatra	8	4	1	3	15	12	+3	37	
7	Pharco	8	2	3	3	8	16	−8	32	
8	Petrojet	8	1	2	5	7	17	−10	27	
9	Haras El Hodoud	8	0	2	6	3	16	−13	24	

Source: Soccerway (championship round)
Rules for classification: 1) Points; 2) Goal difference; 3) Goals scored; 4) Play-off tie.
(Note: Clubs qualified for this phase with the full regular season points they got, but without goals for or against)
(C) Champions
Notes:

Pos	Team	Pld	W	D	L	GF	GA	GD	Pts
5	Modern Sport	8	5	2	1	12	7	+5	26
6	Al Ittihad	8	1	5	2	3	5	−2	26
7	Smouha	8	0	5	3	2	6	−4	25
8	Ismaily	8	2	3	3	7	7	0	23
9	Ghazl El Mahalla	8	1	3	4	4	12	−8	23

Source: Soccerway (relegation round)
Rules for classification: 1) Points; 2) Goal difference; 3) Goals scored; 4) Play-off tie.
(Note: Clubs qualified for this phase with the full regular season points they got, but without goals for or against)

==== Results summary ====
Overall								Home						Away					
Pld	W	D	L	GF	GA	GD	Pts	W	D	L	GF	GA	GD	W	D	L	GF	GA	GD
8	2	2	4	7	11	−4	8	1	1	2	3	6	−3	1	1	2	4	5	−1

Last updated: 12 January 2025.

==== Results by round ====
Round	1	2	3	4	5	6	7	8	9
Ground	A	H	A	H	A	H	A	H	A
Result	W	L	D	D	L	L	L	W	
Position	2	6	7	10	14	16			

Updated to match(es) played on 12 January 2025. Source:
A = Away; H = Home; W = Win; D = Draw; L = Loss

==== Matches ====
The league schedule was released on 19 October 2024.

30 October 2024 1	Haras El Hodoud	1–3	Smouha	Alexandria
17:00 UTC+3	Roqa 45+1' (pen.)		Saber 34'; El Ouadi 45+4'; Hassan 46'	Stadium: Haras El Hodoud Stadium; Referee: Hamada Al-Qalawi

8 November 2024 2	Smouha	0–2	Zamalek	Alexandria
17:00 UTC+2			Mansi 2'; Shalaby 85'	Stadium: Borg El Arab Stadium; Referee: Tarek Magdy

23 November 2024 3	Tala'ea El Gaish	0–0	Smouha	Cairo
17:00 UTC+2				Stadium: Gehaz El Reyada Stadium; Referee: Abdel Aziz El-Sayed

1 December 2024 4	Smouha	0–0	El Gouna	Alexandria
20:00 UTC+2				Stadium: Alexandria Stadium; Referee: Hisham Al-Qadi

26 December 2024 6	Smouha	2–4	Ghazl El Mahalla	Alexandria
17:00 UTC+2	Hassan 20' (pen.); Saber 75'		Amoory 32'; Ben Hammouda 53' (pen.), 88' (pen.); Zaky 56' (pen.); El Akhmimi (yellow card) 75' (yellow-red card) 90+4'	Stadium: Alexandria Stadium; Referee: Mohamed Maarouf

30 December 2024 7	Pharco	2–1	Smouha	Alexandria
20:00 UTC+2	Nasser 54' (pen.); El Moutaraji 80'		Dokou 19'	Stadium: Haras El Hodoud Stadium; Referee: Mahmoud Wafa

7 January 2025 5	Al Ahly	2–0	Smouha	Cairo
16:00 UTC+2	Afsha 45+3'; Ashour 50'			Stadium: Cairo International Stadium; Referee: Nader Qamar Al-Dawla
Note: The match originally scheduled for 22 December 2024, was postponed due to Al-Ahly's participation in the CAF Champions League.

12 January 2025 8	Smouha	1–0	Modern Sport	Alexandria
19:00 UTC+2	Hassan 43'			Stadium: Alexandria Stadium

21 January 2025 9	Ismaily	v	Smouha	Ismailia
19:00 UTC+2				Stadium: Ismailia Stadium; Referee: Ahmed El-Ghandour

=== Egypt Cup ===
4 January 2025 Round of 32	Smouha	1–0	Suez	Alexandria
17:30 UTC+2	Salem 45+3'			Stadium: Alexandria Stadium; Referee: El Sayed Mounir

17 January 2025 Round of 16	Smouha	1–0	ZED	Alexandria
17:30 UTC+2	Salem 8'			Stadium: Borg El Arab Stadium; Referee: Mahmoud El Banna

=== Egyptian League Cup ===
==== Group stage ====
Pos	Team	Pld	W	D	L	GF	GA	GD	Pts	Qualification
1	Petrojet	4	4	0	0	6	2	+4	12	Advance to knockout stage
2	Modern Sport	4	1	2	1	2	1	+1	5	Advance to knockout stage
3	Zamalek	4	1	2	1	3	3	0	5	
4	El Gouna	4	1	2	1	2	2	0	5	
5	Smouha	4	0	0	4	1	6	−5	0	

Source: EPL
Rules for classification: Group stage tiebreakers

11 December 2024 1	El Gouna	1–0	Smouha	El Gouna
17:00 UTC+2	Shika 65'			Stadium: Khaled Bichara Stadium; Referee: Mohamed El Desouki

18 March 2025 2	Smouha	v	Petrojet	Alexandria
				Stadium: Alexandria Stadium

23 March 2025 3	Modern Sport	v	Smouha	Cairo

23 April 2025 4	Smouha	v	Zamalek	Alexandria
				Stadium: Alexandria Stadium
