= Old Edwardians F.C. =

Old Edwardians FC
- Full name: Old Edwardians Football Club
- Nickname: The May Park Boys
- Ground: National Stadium; Freetown, Sierra Leone
- Capacity: 45,000
- Chairman: Mamadu Bobor Barri
- Manager: Elvis Kargbo
- League: Sierra Leone National Premier League
- 2025–26: 4th out of 18 clubs

Old Edwardians Football Club commonly known as Old Edwards or simply Edwards is a Sierra Leonean football club based in the capital Freetown. The club is a member of the Sierra Leone National Premier League, the top football league in Sierra Leone.

Old Edwardians are one of the biggest and most popular clubs in Sierra Leone. Former Sierra Leonean international footballer Mohamed Kallon started his professional football career at Old Edwardians as a fifteen-year-old.

== Honours ==
- Sierra Leone National Premier League
  - Champions (1): 1990
- Sierra Leonean FA Cup
  - Winners (3): 1984, 2001, 2005
