= Sallieu Bah =

Sierra Leonean footballer (born 2006)

Personal information
- Date of birth: 10 September 2006 (age 20)
- Height: 1.76 m (5 ft 9 in)
- Position: Midfielder

Team information
- Current team: Zorya Luhansk
- Number: 88

Youth career
- Central Parade F.C.
- 2023: JFV Nordkreis

Senior career*
Years	Team	Apps	(Gls)
2022	Central Parade		
2023	Wilberforce Strikers		
2023–2024	Petrolul 95 Ploieşti	13	(15)
2024–2026	Wilberforce Strikers		
2026–	Zorya Luhansk	7	(0)

International career^{‡}
2024	Sierra Leone U 20	4	(0)
2023–2024	Sierra Leone	5	(0)
- * Club domestic league appearances and goals as of 3 June 2026 ‡ National team caps and goals as of 16:14, 18 January 2024 (UTC)

Sallieu Bah (born 10 September 2006) is a Sierra Leonean international footballer who plays as a midfielder for Ukrainian Premier League club Zorya Luhansk.

== Club career ==
Bah played for Central Parade, where his performances earned plaudits from media in Sierra Leone. On 11 October 2023, he was named by English newspaper The Guardian as one of the best players born in 2006 worldwide. He then joined Wilberforce Strikers FC in December 2022 and moved in the Summer of 2023 to Europe.

He played among 4 other Sierra Leonean players Alieya Mansaray, Alie Ramadan Kabia, Mohamed Bangura, David Destiny Conteh and Nasiru Jimmissa, for three months in Germany at academy JFV Nordkreis and signed than in September 2023 for Romanian side Romanian ASCS Petrolul 95 Ploieşti. In Romania scored 15 goals, in 14 Games for Petrolul 95 Ploieşti in the Liga IV Prahova and gained interests from Liga Iside clubs, include CS Rapid.

In February 2026, Bah joined Ukrainian Premier League club Zorya Luhansk having impressed on trial with the club.

== International career ==
Bah made his international debut for Sierra Leone on 11 September 2023, coming on as a second-half substitute for Saidu Bah Kamara in a 2–1 away loss to Guinea-Bissau. Despite his side's loss, he was praised by Sierra Leone Football Association president Thomas Daddy Brima, stating that Bah "showed class, confidence and pure talent" and that "it was so much joy watching this young lad." Bah played 2024 in 4 Qualification games, for the TotalEnergies U-20 Africa Cup of Nations.

== Career statistics ==
=== International ===
As of matches played 18 January 2024.

National team	Year	Apps	Goals
Sierra Leone	2023	4	0
Sierra Leone	2024	1	0
Total		5	0
