= Abdallah Bostangy =

Egyptian footballer (born 2005)

Personal information
- Full name: Abdallah Fouad Bostangy
- Date of birth: 10 April 2005 (age 21)
- Place of birth: Cairo, Egypt
- Height: 1.85 m (6 ft 1 in)
- Position: Centre back

Team information
- Current team: Smouha
- Number: 37

Youth career
- –2024: Al Ahly

Senior career*
Years	Team	Apps	(Gls)
2024–	→Smouha(loan)	1	(0)

International career^{‡}
2022–2024	Egypt U17	11	(0)
2024–	Egypt U20		
- * Club domestic league appearances and goals as of 17 September 2024 ‡ National team caps and goals as of 23:14, 23 October 2024 (UTC)

Abdallah Fouad Bostangy (Arabic: عبدالله فؤاد بستانجي; born 10 April 2005) is an Egyptian professional footballer who plays as a centre back for Egyptian Premier League club Smouha on loan from Al Ahly.

== Career statistics ==
=== Club ===
As of 10 November 2024

Appearances and goals by club, season and competition
Club	Season	League			Cup		Continental		Other		Total	
Club	Season	Division	Apps	Goals	Apps	Goals	Apps	Goals	Apps	Goals	Apps	Goals
Smouha (Loan)	2023–24	EPL	1	0	0	0	0	0	0	0	1	0
Smouha (Loan)	2024–25	EPL	0	0	0	0	0	0	0	0	0	0
Career total			1	0	0	0	0	0	0	0	1	0
