= Alpha Turay =

Sierra Leonean footballer (born 2005)

Personal information
- Date of birth: 26 May 2005 (age 21)
- Place of birth: Freetown, Sierra Leone
- Height: 1.85 m (6 ft 1 in)
- Position: Midfielder

Team information
- Current team: El Gouna
- Number: 36

Senior career*
Years	Team	Apps	(Gls)
2022–2024	Kallon		
2024–2025	Radnički 1923	1	(0)
2025	→ Dubočica (loan)	3	(0)
2025–	El Gouna	17	(0)

International career^{‡}
2023–	Sierra Leone	11	(0)
- * Club domestic league appearances and goals as of 1 July 2026 ‡ National team caps and goals as of 17 June 2026

Alpha Turay (born 26 May 2005) is a Sierra Leonean professional footballer who plays as a midfielder for Egyptian club El Gouna.

== Club career ==
Turay played for Kallon in the Sierra Leone National Premier League, making his debut in February 2022, before moving to Europe and joining Serbian side Radnički 1923 in July 2024.

== International career ==
Turay debuted for Sierra Leone national football team in 2023.
