= 2025 U-20 Africa Cup of Nations =

25th edition of U-20 AFCON

2025 CAF U-20 Africa Cup of Nations
كأس أمم إفريقيا تحت 20 سنة 2025

Tournament details
- Host country: Egypt
- Dates: 27 April – 18 May
- Teams: 13 (from 1 confederation)
- Venues: 4 (in 3 host cities)

Final positions
- Champions: South Africa (1st title)
- Runners-up: Morocco
- Third place: Nigeria
- Fourth place: Egypt

Tournament statistics
- Matches played: 30
- Goals scored: 58 (1.93 per match)
- Top scorer: (Sierra Leone) Momoh Kamara (4 goals)
- Best player: (South Africa) Tylon Smith
- Best goalkeeper: (South Africa) Fletcher Smythe-Lowe
- Fair play award: Morocco

The 2025 U-20 Africa Cup of Nations, known as the 2025 U20 AFCON for short and as the 2025 TotalEnergies U-20 Africa Cup of Nations for sponsorship purposes, was the 18th edition (25th if editions of the tournament without hosts are included) of the biennial African international youth football tournament organized by the Confederation of African Football (CAF).

The four semi-finalists also qualified as the CAF representatives for the 2025 FIFA U-20 World Cup in Chile.

Senegal were the defending champions, but were eliminated in the quarter-finals in a penalty shoot-out against Nigeria.

== Qualification ==
=== Player eligibility ===
Players born 1 January 2005 or later were eligible to participate in the competition.

=== Qualified teams ===
The following 13 teams qualified for the tournament:

Team	Zone	Date of qualification	Appearance	Last appearance	Previous best performance
Morocco	North Zone	23 November 2024	6th	2021	Champions (1997)
Egypt (hosts)	North Zone	26 November 2024	13th	2023	Champions (1991, 2003, 2013)
Tunisia	North Zone	10 April 2025	3rd	2023	Fourth place (2021, 2023)
Senegal	West A Zone	25 September 2024	7th	2023	Champions (2023)
Sierra Leone	West A Zone	25 September 2024	1st	None	Debut
Ghana	West B Zone	27 October 2024	13th	2021	Champions (1993, 1999, 2009, 2021)
Nigeria	West B Zone	27 October 2024	13th	2023	Champions (2005, 2011, 2015)
DR Congo	Central Zone	1 October 2024	2nd	2013	Group stage (2013)
Central African Republic	Central Zone	22 March 2025 (Note: Congo were suspended on 6 February 2025 due to government interference in FECOFOOT operations, and Congo were not included in the draw. After the draw, Central African Republic were named as replacements on 22 March 2025.)	3rd	2023	Quarter-finals (2021)
Kenya	Central-East Zone	18 October 2024	1st	None	Debut
Tanzania	Central-East Zone	18 October 2024	2nd	2021	Group stage (2021)
South Africa	South Zone	3 October 2024	9th	2019	Runners-up (1997)
Zambia	South Zone	3 October 2024	9th	2023	Champions (2017)

=== Draw ===
The draw procedure was announced on 10 February 2025. The 13 teams were drawn into one group of five teams and two groups of four teams. Teams are seeded according to their performance in the 2023 U-20 Africa Cup of Nations. Hosts at the time of the draw Ivory Coast were automatically assigned to Position A1 in the draw, later replaced by Egypt. Previous edition winners Senegal were assigned to Position C1 and third place Nigeria were assigned to Position B1. The 3 qualified teams that also participated in the last edition, Congo, Egypt (later replaced by Tunisia), and Zambia, were seeded in Pot 1. The rest of the field were placed in Pot 2 to be drawn into the remaining positions.

Pot 1	Pot 2
Tunisia; Zambia; Central African Republic	Ghana; DR Congo; Morocco; Sierra Leone; Kenya; South Africa; Tanzania

== Venues ==
The host country for the final stage of the edition was decided at the annual 2024 CAF Executive Committee meeting and CAF Awards in Marrakesh, Morocco on 16 December 2024, with CAF appointing Ivory Coast as hosts.

On 26 March 2025, it was announced that Ivory Coast had withdrawn as hosts, also forfeiting their automatic qualification spot. The new host country was not immediately announced.

On 27 March 2025, it was announced that Egypt would replace Ivory Coast as hosts. Egypt had previously submitted a bid to host during the initial bidding process. The opening match would also be pushed back one day to 27 April.

2025 U-20 Africa Cup of Nations is located in Egypt
Cairo		Ismailia	Suez
Cairo International Stadium	30 June Stadium	Suez Canal Stadium	Suez Stadium
Capacity: 75,000	Capacity: 30,000	Capacity: 22,000	Capacity: 27,000

== Group stage ==
=== Tiebreakers ===
Teams were ranked according to the three points for a win system (3 points for a win, 1 for a draw, 0 points for a loss), and if tied on points, the following tiebreaking criteria are applied, in the order given, to determine the rankings:

1. Points in head-to-head matches among tied teams;
2. Goal difference in head-to-head matches among tied teams;
3. Goals scored in head-to-head matches among tied teams;
4. If more than two teams were tied, and after applying all head-to-head criteria above, if two teams are still tied, all head-to-head criteria above are applied exclusively to these two teams;
5. Goal difference in all group matches;
6. Goals scored in all group matches;
7. Drawing of lots.

=== Group A ===
Pos	Team	Pld	W	D	L	GF	GA	GD	Pts	Qualification
1	South Africa	4	2	1	1	6	3	+3	7 (Note: Head-to-head records: South Africa: 3 pts (1 W, 0 D, 1 L), +2 GD (4 GF, 2 GA); Sierra Leone: 3 pts (1 W, 0 D, 1 L), 0 GD (5 GF, 5 GA); Egypt: 3 pts (1 W, 0 D, 1 L), −2 GD (2 GF, 4 GA))	Knockout stage
2	Sierra Leone	4	2	1	1	6	5	+1	7	Knockout stage
3	Egypt (H)	4	2	1	1	3	4	−1	7	Knockout stage
4	Zambia	4	1	3	0	2	1	+1	6	
5	Tanzania	4	0	0	4	0	4	−4	0	

Source: CAF
Rules for classification: Tiebreakers
(H) Hosts
Notes:
27 April 2025
18:00

Zambia	0–0	Sierra Leone
	Report

Suez Canal Stadium, Ismailia
Referee: Shamirah Nabadda (Uganda)
27 April 2025
21:00

Egypt	1–0	South Africa
El Hadad 62'	Report

Cairo International Stadium, Cairo
Referee: Aklesso Gnama (Togo)

30 April 2025
18:00

South Africa	1–0	Tanzania
April 27'	Report

Suez Canal Stadium, Ismailia
Referee: Houssam Benyahia (Algeria)
30 April 2025
21:00

Sierra Leone	4–1	Egypt
Mom. Kamara 63', 66', 90+8'; S. Bah 75' (pen.)	Report	Kabaka 45+5'

Suez Canal Stadium, Ismailia
Referee: Dickens Nyagrowa (Kenya)

3 May 2025
18:00

Tanzania	0–1	Sierra Leone
	Report	Gandi 37'

Suez Canal Stadium, Ismailia
Referee: Hugues Kokora (Ivory Coast)
3 May 2025
21:00

Egypt	0–0	Zambia
	Report

Suez Canal Stadium, Ismailia
Referee: Abdallah Jammeh (Gambia)

6 May 2025
18:00

Zambia	1–0	Tanzania
Banda 90+11' (pen.)	Report

Suez Canal Stadium, Ismailia
Referee: Aklesso Gnama (Togo)
6 May 2025
21:00

Sierra Leone	1–4	South Africa
Mom. Kamara 69'	Report	Ahshene 13'; Rapoo 60'; Mahlangu 86', 89'

Suez Canal Stadium, Ismailia
Referee: Abdou Mefire (Cameroon)

9 May 2025
21:00

South Africa	1–1	Zambia
Letlhaku 8'	Report	B. Phiri 12'

30 June Stadium, Cairo
Referee: Hugues Kokora (Ivory Coast)
9 May 2025
21:00

Tanzania	0–1	Egypt
	Report	Sharaf 7'

Suez Canal Stadium, Ismailia
Referee: Abdou Mefire (Cameroon)

=== Group B ===
Pos	Team	Pld	W	D	L	GF	GA	GD	Pts	Qualification
1	Morocco	3	2	1	0	6	3	+3	7	Knockout stage
2	Nigeria	3	1	2	0	3	2	+1	5	Knockout stage
3	Tunisia	3	1	0	2	4	5	−1	3	
4	Kenya	3	0	1	2	5	8	−3	1	

Source: CAF
Rules for classification: Tiebreakers
1 May 2025
18:00

Nigeria	1–0	Tunisia
Ibrahim 38'	Report

30 June Stadium, Cairo
Referee: Abdou Mefire (Cameroon)
1 May 2025
21:00

Kenya	2–3	Morocco
Ouma 16'; Beja 71'	Report	Zabiri 45', 55'; Laalaoui 78'

30 June Stadium, Cairo
Referee: Akhona Makalima (South Africa)

4 May 2025
18:00

Tunisia	3–1	Kenya
Bousnina 45+18' (pen.); Ben Ali 70'; Derbali 85'	Report	Ouma 38'

30 June Stadium, Cairo
Referee: Emmanuel Mensah (Liberia)
4 May 2025
21:00

Morocco	0–0	Nigeria
	Report

30 June Stadium, Cairo
Referee: Shamirah Nabadda (Uganda)

7 May 2025
18:00

Nigeria	2–2	Kenya
Arierhi 13'; Bameyi 73' (pen.)	Report	Injehu 6' (pen.); Gitama 68'

30 June Stadium, Cairo
Referee: Shahenda El Maghrabi (Egypt)
7 May 2025
18:00

Tunisia	1–3	Morocco
Doubal 53'	Report	Arguigue 43'; Bakhty 86'; El-Abdellaoui 90+2'

Suez Canal Stadium, Ismailia
Referee: Abdallah Jammeh (Gambia)

=== Group C ===
Pos	Team	Pld	W	D	L	GF	GA	GD	Pts	Qualification
1	Ghana	3	2	1	0	3	1	+2	7	Knockout stage
2	Senegal	3	1	1	1	3	2	+1	4 (Note: Ranked on head-to-head: Senegal 2–0 DR Congo.)	Knockout stage
3	DR Congo	3	1	1	1	4	4	0	4	Knockout stage
4	Central African Republic	3	0	1	2	2	5	−3	1	

Source: CAF
Rules for classification: Tiebreakers
Notes:
2 May 2025
18:00

Senegal	1–1	Central African Republic
Thiam 49'	Report	Pengazonia 74'

Suez Stadium, Suez
Referee: Shahenda El Maghrabi (Egypt)
2 May 2025
21:00

DR Congo	1–1	Ghana
Ntanda-Lukisa 16'	Report	Aziz 24'

Suez Stadium, Suez
Referee: Luxolo Badi (South Africa)

5 May 2025
18:00

Central African Republic	1–3	DR Congo
Nzabakomada 10'	Report	Makanza 42', 50'; Ntanda-Lukisa 59'

Suez Stadium, Suez
Referee: Natacha Konan (Ivory Coast
5 May 2025
21:00

Ghana	1–0	Senegal
Mensah 15'	Report

Suez Stadium, Suez
Referee: Hillary Hambaba (Zambia)

8 May 2025
18:00

Central African Republic	0–1	Ghana
	Report	Opoku 84'

Suez Canal Stadium, Ismailia
Referee: Akhona Makalima (South Africa)
8 May 2025
18:00

Senegal	2–0	DR Congo
Thiam 11'; Dieng 87'	Report

Suez Stadium, Suez
Referee: Dickens Nyagrowa (Kenya)

=== Ranking of third-placed teams ===
The ranking of the third-placed teams was determined after removing the results of the team ranked fifth in Group A, which was Tanzania.

Pos	Grp	Team	Pld	W	D	L	GF	GA	GD	Pts	Qualification
1	C	DR Congo	3	1	1	1	4	4	0	4	Knockout stage
2	A	Egypt	3	1	1	1	2	4	−2	4	Knockout stage
3	B	Tunisia	3	1	0	2	4	5	−1	3	

Source: CAF

== Knockout stage ==
In the knockout stage, extra time and penalty shoot-outs are used to decide the winner if necessary (Regulations Article 75).

=== Bracket ===
Quarter-finals
12 May
South Africa (a.e.t.)	1
DR Congo	0
12 May
Nigeria (p)	0 (3)
Senegal	0 (1)
12 May
Morocco (a.e.t.)	1
Sierra Leone	0
12 May
Ghana	2 (4)
Egypt (p)	2 (5)

Semi-finals
15 May
South Africa	1
Nigeria	0
15 May
Morocco	1
Egypt	0

Final
18 May
South Africa	1
Morocco	0
Third place
18 May
Nigeria (p)	1 (4)
Egypt	1 (1)

=== Quarter-finals ===
Winners qualify for the 2025 FIFA U-20 World Cup.

12 May 2025
15:00

Nigeria	0–0 (a.e.t.)	Senegal
	Report
Penalties
Benjamin (penalty scored); Chukwu (penalty scored); Ayuma (penalty scored)	3–1	(penalty missed) Dorival; (penalty scored) Diouck; (penalty missed) Faye; (penalty missed) Konaté

Suez Canal Stadium, Ismailia
Referee: Houssam Benyahia (Algeria)

12 May 2025
18:00

Morocco	1–0 (a.e.t.)	Sierra Leone
Boumassaoudi 115'	Report

30 June Stadium, Cairo
Referee: Abdou Mefire (Cameroon)

12 May 2025
18:00

Ghana	2–2 (a.e.t.)	Egypt
Issah 45+2'; Sulemana 90+11'	Report	Sherif 19', 27'
Penalties
Issah (penalty scored); Antwi (penalty missed); Marfo (penalty scored); Opoku (penalty scored); Aziz (penalty scored)	4–5	(penalty scored) Abdin; (penalty scored) Kabaka; (penalty scored) Essam; (penalty scored) Raafat; (penalty scored) Bostangy

Suez Stadium, Suez
Referee: Shamirah Nabadda (Uganda)

12 May 2025
21:00

South Africa	1–0 (a.e.t.)	DR Congo
Mahlangu 105+4'	Report

Suez Canal Stadium, Ismailia
Referee: Abdallah Jammeh (Gambia)

=== Semi-finals ===
15 May 2025
18:00

South Africa	1–0	Nigeria
Smith 66'	Report

Suez Canal Stadium, Ismailia
Referee: Houssam Benyahia (Algeria)

15 May 2025
21:00

Morocco	1–0	Egypt
El-Abdellaoui 77'	Report

30 June Stadium, Cairo
Referee: Aklesso Gnama (Togo)

=== Third place match ===
18 May 2025
18:00

Nigeria	1–1	Egypt
Amole 47'	Report	Hassan 3'
Penalties
Chukwu (penalty scored); Ayuma (penalty scored); Arierhi (penalty scored); Maigana (penalty scored)	4–1	Khedr (penalty scored); Kabaka (penalty missed); Atef (penalty missed)

30 June Stadium, Cairo
Referee: Shamirah Nabadda (Uganda)

=== Final ===
18 May 2025
21:00

South Africa	1–0	Morocco
Kekana 70'	Report

30 June Stadium, Cairo
Referee: Abdou Mefire (Cameroon)

== Tournament rankings ==
Ranking criteria
For teams eliminated in the same knockout round, the following criteria were applied, in the order given, to determine the final rankings:
1. Goal difference in round eliminated;
2. Goals scored in round eliminated;
3. If teams eliminated in the semi-finals are tied, the above criteria are reapplied for the previous knockout round, with this process repeated once more should two semi-finalists remain tied;
4. Points in group stage;
5. Goal difference in group stage;
6. Goals scored in group stage;
7. Disciplinary points.

For teams eliminated in the group stage, the following criteria were applied, in the order given, to determine the final rankings

1. Position in group;
2. Points;
3. Goal difference;
4. Goals scored;
5. Disciplinary points.

Pos.	Team	Pld	W	D	L	Pts	GF	GA	GD
1	South Africa	7	5	1	1	16	9	3	+6
2	Morocco	6	4	1	1	13	8	4	+4
3	Nigeria	6	1	4	1	7	4	4	0
4	Egypt	7	2	3	2	9	6	8	−2
Eliminated in the quarter-finals
5	Ghana	4	2	2	0	8	5	3	+2
6	Senegal	4	1	2	1	5	3	2	+1
7	Sierra Leone	5	2	1	2	7	6	6	0
8	DR Congo	4	1	1	2	4	4	5	−1
Eliminated in the group stage
9	Tunisia	3	1	0	2	3	4	5	−1
10	Zambia	3	1	0	2	3	2	1	+1
11	Kenya	3	0	1	2	1	5	8	−3
12	Central African Republic	3	0	1	2	1	2	5	−3
13	Tanzania	4	0	0	4	0	0	4	−4

== Qualified teams for FIFA U-20 World Cup ==
The following teams from CAF qualified for the 2025 FIFA U-20 World Cup in Chile.

Team	Qualified on	Previous appearances in FIFA U-20 World Cup^{1}
Nigeria	12 May 2025	13 (1983, 1985, 1987, 1989, 1999, 2005, 2007, 2009, 2011, 2013, 2015, 2019, 2023)
Morocco	12 May 2025	3 (1977, 1997, 2005)
Egypt	12 May 2025	8 (1981, 1991, 2001, 2003, 2005, 2009, 2011, 2013)
South Africa	12 May 2025	4 (1997, 2009, 2017, 2019)

^{1} Bold indicates champions for that year. Italic indicates hosts for that year.

== See also ==
- 2025 U-17 Africa Cup of Nations
