= Alieu Jatta =

Gambian footballer

Personal information
- Date of birth: 18 September 1995 (age 31)
- Place of birth: Farato, Gambia
- Height: 1.79 m (5 ft 10 in)
- Position: Defender

Team information
- Current team: El Gouna

Senior career*
Years	Team	Apps	(Gls)
2014	Brikama United		
2014–2016	Génération Foot		
2016–2017	Metz B	11	(0)
2017–2018	Villerupt Thil		
2018–2020	Casa Sports		
2020–2021	Nogoom		
2021–2023	Asyut Petroleum		
2023–	El Gouna	33	(0)

International career
2016	Gambia	2	(0)
- * Club domestic league appearances and goals as of 17:39, 6 August 2025 (UTC)

Alieu Jatta (born 18 September 1995) is a Gambian international footballer who plays as a defender for Egyptian club El Gouna.

== Career ==
Born in Farato, he has played club football for Brikama United, Génération Foot, Metz B, Villerupt Thil, Casa Sports, Nogoom, Asyut Petroleum, and El Gouna.

He made his international debut for Gambia in 2016, earning 2 caps.
