= Samuel Ntanda-Lukisa =

Congolese footballer

Personal information
- Full name: Samuel Ntanda-Lukisa
- Date of birth: 30 June 2005 (age 21)
- Place of birth: Brussels, Belgium
- Height: 1.85 m (6 ft 1 in)
- Position: Winger

Team information
- Current team: União Leiria
- Number: 82

Youth career
- –2020: Anderlecht
- 2020: Mechelen
- 2020–2022: Sint-Truiden
- 2022–2025: Sampdoria

Senior career*
Years	Team	Apps	(Gls)
2023–2025	Sampdoria	10	(0)
2025–2026	RSCA Futures	20	(4)
2026–	União Leiria	3	(1)

International career^{‡}
2022	Belgium U18	3	(0)
2023	Belgium U19	1	(1)
2024–2025	DR Congo U20	6	(2)
2026–	DR Congo U23	3	(0)
- * Club domestic league appearances and goals as of 08:01, 27 August 2026 (UTC) ‡ National team caps and goals as of 08:01, 27 August 2026 (UTC)

Samuel Ntanda-Lukisa (born 30 June 2005) is a professional footballer who plays as a winger for Liga Portugal 2 club União Leiria. Born in Belgium, he is a youth international for the DR Congo.

== Club career ==
Ntanda-Lukisa is a youth product of the Belgian clubs Anderlecht, Mechelen, and Sint-Truiden before moving to the youth academy of the Italian club Sampdoria on 27 August 2022. He made his senior and professional debut with Sampdoria as a late substitute in a 2–0 Serie A loss to Napoli on 4 June 2023.

On 6 August 2025, Ntanda-Lukisa re-joined his former youth club Anderlecht, signing a contract until 2027 with an option for an additional year. He was initially assigned to their reserve team that plays in the second-tier Challenger Pro League, RSCA Futures.

== International career ==
Born in Belgium, Ntanda-Lukisa is of Congolese descent. He was a youth international for Belgium, having played up to the Belgium U19s. He later switched to play for the DR Congo, having earned six caps for the under 20s.
