= Ahmed Khaled =

Egyptian footballer (born 2005)

Kabaka
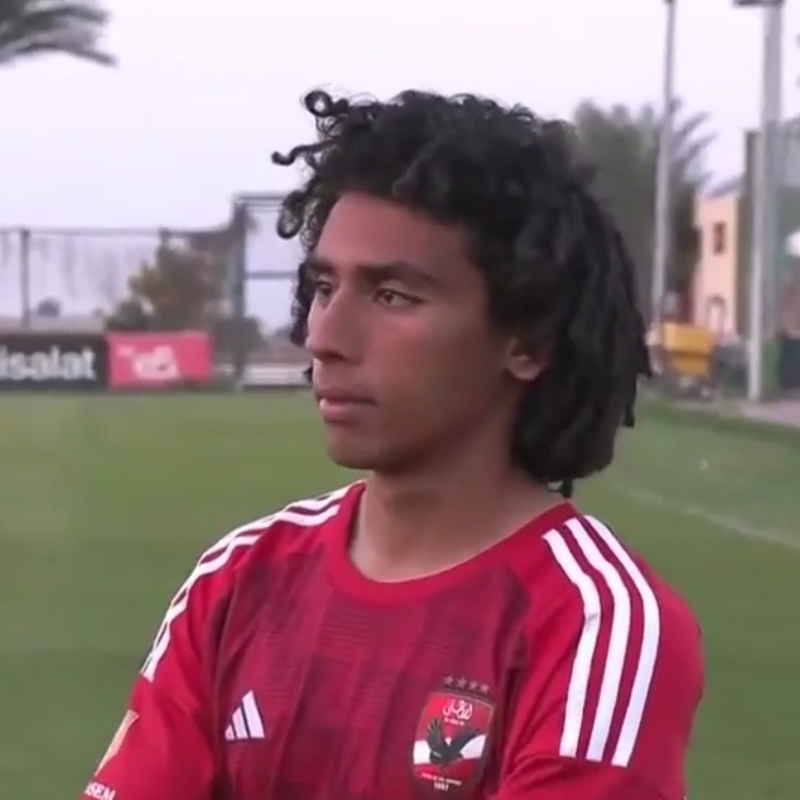
- Kabaka with Al Ahly in 2023

Personal information
- Full name: Ahmed Khaled Gomaa Soliman
- Date of birth: 22 April 2005 (age 21)
- Place of birth: Cairo, Egypt
- Position: Defensive midfielder

Team information
- Current team: Modern Sport
- Number: 34

Youth career
- 2010–2016: Al Mokawloon Al Arab
- 2016–2022: Wadi Degla
- 2022–2024: Al Ahly

Senior career*
Years	Team	Apps	(Gls)
2023–	Al Ahly	0	(0)
2024–2025	→ Modern Sport (loan)	21	(0)
2025–2026	→ ZED (loan)	16	(0)

International career^{‡}
2023–2025	Egypt U20	28	(7)
- * Club domestic league appearances and goals as of 26 August 2026 ‡ National team caps and goals as of 26 August 2026

Ahmed Khaled Gomaa Soliman (Arabic: أحمد خالد; born 22 April 2005), known by his nickname Kabaka (Arabic: كباكا), is an Egyptian professional footballer who plays as a defensive midfielder for the Egyptian Premier League club Al Ahly, and the Egypt under-23 national team.

== Honours ==
=== Club ===
Al Ahly

- Egyptian Premier League: 2022–23
