= 2025 FIFA U-20 World Cup squads =

FIFA championship roster

The 2025 FIFA U-20 World Cup was an international football tournament held in Chile from 27 September to 19 October 2025. The 24 participating national teams were required to register a squad of 21 players, including at least three goalkeepers (Regulations Article 26.1). Only players in these squads were eligible to take part in the tournament. The tournament exclusively required players to be born between 1 January 2005 and 31 December 2009 to be eligible, that is, they had to be a maximum of 20 years old and at least 16 years old by the end of the calendar year in which the competition was played (Regulations Article 24.2).

Each participating national team had to submit a provisional list of a minimum of 35 and a maximum of 55 players (including at least four goalkeepers) to FIFA by the deadline stipulated by them. The provisional lists were not published by FIFA and player changes were allowed only in exceptional cases (Regulations Article 25). The final list of 21 players per national team had to be submitted to FIFA by the deadline stipulated by them. All players in the final list had to be chosen from the respective provisional list. Players in the final squad could be replaced by a player from the preliminary squad due to serious injury or illness up to 24 hours prior to kickoff of the team's first match (Regulations Article 26.3).

FIFA published final lists of all teams on 22 September 2025.

The age listed for each player is on 27 September 2025, the first day of the tournament. The nationality for each club reflects the national association (not the league) to which the club is affiliated. A flag is included for coaches who are of a different nationality than their own national team. Player names marked in bold have been capped at full international level.

== Group A ==
=== Chile ===
The final 21-player squad was announced on 18 September 2025.

Head coach: Nicolás Córdova

No.	Pos.	Player	Date of birth (age)	Club
1	GK	Sebastián Mella	31 July 2005 (aged 20)	(Football Federation of Chile) Huachipato
2	DF	**Ian Garguez**	3 February 2005 (aged 20)	(Football Federation of Chile) Palestino
3	DF	Milovan Celis	8 June 2006 (aged 19)	(Football Federation of Chile) Unión Española
4	DF	Patricio Romero	25 May 2005 (aged 20)	(Football Federation of Chile) Cobreloa
5	DF	Nicolás Suárez	31 July 2005 (aged 20)	(Football Federation of Chile) Colo-Colo
6	MF	Nicolás Cárcamo	1 February 2005 (aged 20)	(Football Federation of Chile) Huachipato
7	FW	Francisco Marchant	31 July 2006 (aged 19)	(Football Federation of Chile) Colo-Colo
8	MF	Flavio Moya	30 December 2005 (aged 19)	(Football Federation of Chile) Universidad de Chile
9	FW	Juan Francisco Rossel	17 March 2005 (aged 20)	(Football Federation of Chile) Universidad Católica
10	MF	**Agustín Arce**	24 January 2005 (aged 20)	(Football Federation of Chile) Deportes Limache
11	FW	Vicente Álvarez	14 December 2006 (aged 18)	(Football Federation of Chile) Unión San Felipe
12	GK	Ignacio Sáez	4 September 2005 (aged 20)	(Football Federation of Chile) Universidad de Chile
13	DF	Matías Pérez	13 April 2005 (aged 20)	(Italian Football Federation) Lecce
14	MF	**Lautaro Millán**	16 August 2005 (aged 20)	(Argentine Football Association) Independiente
15	MF	Joaquín Silva	6 March 2005 (aged 20)	(Football Federation of Chile) Santiago Wanderers
16	MF	Mario Sandoval	7 August 2007 (aged 18)	(Football Federation of Chile) Audax Italiano
17	FW	**Emiliano Ramos**	8 March 2005 (aged 20)	(Football Federation of Chile) Everton
18	FW	Rodrigo Godoy	7 September 2005 (aged 20)	(Football Federation of Chile) O'Higgins
19	FW	Willy Chatiliez	26 March 2005 (aged 20)	(Royal Spanish Football Federation) Huesca
20	DF	**Felipe Faúndez**	27 March 2006 (aged 19)	(Football Federation of Chile) O'Higgins
21	GK	Gabriel Maureira	7 February 2007 (aged 18)	(Football Federation of Chile) Colo-Colo

=== Egypt ===
The final 21-player squad was announced on 19 September 2025.

Head coach: Osama Nabieh

No.	Pos.	Player	Date of birth (age)	Club
1	GK	Abdelmonem Tamer	3 August 2006 (aged 19)	(Egyptian Football Association) ZED
2	DF	Tebo Gabriel	2 January 2006 (aged 19)	(German Football Association) Mainz 05
3	DF	Moataz Mohamed	20 March 2005 (aged 20)	(Egyptian Football Association) Haras El Hodoud
4	DF	Ahmed Abdin	1 May 2006 (aged 19)	(Egyptian Football Association) Al Ahly
5	DF	Abdallah Bostangy	10 April 2005 (aged 20)	(Egyptian Football Association) ZED
6	MF	Seif Safaga	3 April 2005 (aged 20)	(Egyptian Football Association) ENPPI
7	FW	Omar Moawad	14 October 2006 (aged 18)	(Egyptian Football Association) Al Ahly
8	MF	Ahmed Khaled	22 April 2005 (aged 20)	(Egyptian Football Association) ZED
9	FW	Mohamed Haitham	17 February 2007 (aged 18)	(Egyptian Football Association) Al Ahly
10	FW	Mohamed Abdallah El Hadad	18 October 2005 (aged 19)	(Egyptian Football Association) Al Ahly
11	FW	Hamed Abdallah	25 September 2005 (aged 20)	(Egyptian Football Association) ENPPI
12	DF	Moamen Sherif	11 February 2006 (aged 19)	(Egyptian Football Association) Al Ittihad
13	DF	Ahmed Nayel	8 April 2005 (aged 20)	(Egyptian Football Association) Haras El Hodoud
14	DF	Mohab Samy	20 February 2005 (aged 20)	(Egyptian Football Association) ENPPI
15	FW	Omar Khedr	25 May 2006 (aged 19)	(The Football Association) Aston Villa
16	GK	Ahmed Waheb	5 May 2005 (aged 20)	(Egyptian Football Association) Al Masry
17	MF	Amr Khaled	6 October 2005 (aged 19)	(Swiss Football Association) Aarau
18	MF	Mohamed El Sayed	20 May 2006 (aged 19)	(Egyptian Football Association) Zamalek
19	MF	Ahmed Wahid	7 July 2005 (aged 20)	(Egyptian Football Association) Ghazl El Mahalla
20	MF	Selim Telib	14 March 2006 (aged 19)	(German Football Association) Hertha BSC
21	GK	Ahmed Menshawy	18 October 2005 (aged 19)	(Egyptian Football Association) Al Ittihad

=== Japan ===
The final 21-player squad was announced on 12 September 2025.

Head coach: Yuzo Funakoshi

No.	Pos.	Player	Date of birth (age)	Club
1	GK	Keisuke Nakamura	27 April 2005 (aged 20)	(Japan Football Association) Tokyo Verdy
2	DF	Rei Umeki	25 August 2005 (aged 20)	(Japan Football Association) FC Imabari
3	DF	Keita Kosugi	18 March 2006 (aged 19)	(Swedish Football Association) Djurgården
4	DF	Kazunari Kita	19 September 2005 (aged 20)	(Royal Spanish Football Federation) Real Sociedad
5	DF	Rion Ichihara	7 July 2005 (aged 20)	(Japan Football Association) RB Omiya Ardija
6	MF	Kosei Ogura	9 April 2005 (aged 20)	(Japan Football Association) Hosei University
7	MF	**Ryūnosuke Satō**	16 October 2006 (aged 18)	(Japan Football Association) Fagiano Okayama
8	MF	Katsuma Fuse	11 March 2007 (aged 18)	(Japan Football Association) University of Tsukuba
9	FW	Soma Kanda	29 December 2005 (aged 19)	(Japan Football Association) Kawasaki Frontale
10	MF	**Yuto Ozeki**	6 February 2005 (aged 20)	(Japan Football Association) Kawasaki Frontale
11	MF	Yumeki Yokoyama	23 September 2005 (aged 20)	(Japan Football Association) FC Imabari
12	GK	**Alexandre Pisano**	10 January 2006 (aged 19)	(Japan Football Association) Nagoya Grampus
13	MF	Hisatsugu Ishii	7 July 2005 (aged 20)	(Japan Football Association) Shonan Bellmare
14	MF	**Shunsuke Saito**	26 April 2005 (aged 20)	(Japan Football Association) Mito HollyHock
15	DF	Harumichi Shiokawa	25 April 2005 (aged 20)	(Japan Football Association) Ryutsu Keizai University
16	DF	Soichiro Mori	29 June 2007 (aged 18)	(Japan Football Association) Nagoya Grampus
17	MF	Hagumu Nakagawa	7 June 2005 (aged 20)	(Japan Football Association) Ryutsu Keizai University
18	MF	Nelson Ishiwatari	10 May 2005 (aged 20)	(Japan Football Association) Iwaki FC
19	FW	Rento Takaoka	12 March 2007 (aged 18)	(French Football Federation) Valenciennes
20	MF	Sora Hiraga	2 March 2005 (aged 20)	(Japan Football Association) Kyoto Sanga
21	GK	Rui Araki	14 October 2007 (aged 17)	(Japan Football Association) Gamba Osaka

=== New Zealand ===
The final 21-player squad was announced on 12 September 2025.

Head coach: (England) Chris Greenacre

No.	Pos.	Player	Date of birth (age)	Club
1	GK	Joe Wallis	7 June 2005 (aged 20)	(The Football Association) West Bromwich Albion
2	FW	Xuan Loke	26 March 2005 (aged 20)	(New Zealand Football) Wellington Phoenix
3	DF	**Lukas Kelly-Heald**	18 March 2005 (aged 20)	(New Zealand Football) Wellington Phoenix
4	DF	James Bulkeley	14 May 2005 (aged 20)	(United States Soccer Federation) FC Dallas
5	MF	Adama Coulibaly	20 January 2005 (aged 20)	(New Zealand Football) Auckland FC
6	MF	Fergus Gillion	19 January 2005 (aged 20)	(New Zealand Football) Wellington Phoenix
7	MF	**Luke Brooke-Smith**	8 June 2008 (aged 17)	(New Zealand Football) Wellington Phoenix
8	FW	Troy Putt	27 September 2006 (aged 19)	(United States Soccer Federation) Minnesota United FC
9	FW	Keegan Kelly	5 June 2005 (aged 20)	(United States Soccer Federation) University of Denver
10	MF	**Nathan Walker**	30 January 2006 (aged 19)	(New Zealand Football) Wellington Phoenix
11	DF	Codey Phoenix	3 February 2005 (aged 20)	(New Zealand Football) Auckland FC
12	FW	Luke Supyk	4 March 2006 (aged 19)	(New Zealand Football) Wellington Phoenix
13	GK	**Henry Gray**	29 March 2005 (aged 20)	(The Football Association) Ipswich Town
14	DF	Noah DuPont	18 October 2007 (aged 17)	(The Football Association) West Bromwich Albion
15	DF	Jayden Smith	4 July 2007 (aged 18)	(New Zealand Football) Wellington Phoenix
16	MF	Ryan Watson	14 June 2005 (aged 20)	(New Zealand Football) Wellington Phoenix
17	MF	Gabriel Sloane-Rodrigues	3 July 2007 (aged 18)	(New Zealand Football) Wellington Phoenix
18	MF	Finn McKenlay	4 September 2005 (aged 20)	(New Zealand Football) Auckland FC
19	MF	Oliver Middleton	19 September 2005 (aged 20)	(New Zealand Football) Auckland FC
20	FW	Stipe Ukich	3 January 2007 (aged 18)	(Croatian Football Federation) Istra 1961
21	GK	Josey Casa-Grande	19 August 2005 (aged 20)	(The Football Association) Dorchester Town

== Group B ==
=== Panama ===
A preliminary 24-player squad was announced on 1 September 2025. The final 21-player squad was announced on 22 September 2025.

Head coach: Jorge Dely Valdés

No.	Pos.	Player	Date of birth (age)	Club
1	GK	Ian Flores	20 March 2005 (aged 20)	(Panamanian Football Federation) San Francisco
2	DF	Javier Arboleda	17 April 2006 (aged 19)	(Panamanian Football Federation) Independiente
3	DF	Julio Rodríguez	9 March 2005 (aged 20)	(Panamanian Football Federation) Plaza Amador
4	DF	**Érick Díaz**	4 March 2006 (aged 19)	(United States Soccer Federation) Los Angeles FC
5	DF	Ariel Arroyo	23 January 2005 (aged 20)	(Panamanian Football Federation) Árabe Unido
6	MF	Luis Villarreal	25 August 2005 (aged 20)	(Panamanian Football Federation) Veraguas
7	MF	Kairo Walters	30 April 2005 (aged 20)	(United States Soccer Federation) Los Angeles FC
8	MF	Anel Ryce	6 July 2006 (aged 19)	(Ukrainian Association of Football) Chornomorets Odesa
9	FW	**Gustavo Herrera**	18 November 2005 (aged 19)	(Costa Rican Football Federation) Saprissa
10	MF	**Giovany Herbert**	12 March 2005 (aged 20)	(Brazilian Football Confederation) Athletico Paranaense
11	MF	Ryan Gómez	4 January 2006 (aged 19)	(Brazilian Football Confederation) Grêmio
12	GK	Cecilio Burgess	21 October 2005 (aged 19)	(Panamanian Football Federation) UMECIT
13	DF	**Martín Krug**	9 July 2006 (aged 19)	(Royal Spanish Football Federation) Levante
14	DF	Juan Hall	9 March 2006 (aged 19)	(Panamanian Football Federation) Herrera
15	MF	Joseph Jones	30 July 2005 (aged 20)	(Panamanian Football Federation) Plaza Amador
16	FW	Kevin Walder	13 April 2006 (aged 19)	(Panamanian Football Federation) Plaza Amador
17	MF	Ernesto Gómez	13 August 2007 (aged 18)	(Panamanian Football Federation) Universitario
18	FW	Karlo Kurányi	27 September 2005 (aged 20)	(German Football Association) SGV Freiberg
19	MF	**Rafael Mosquera**	25 May 2005 (aged 20)	(United States Soccer Federation) New York Red Bulls
20	DF	Antony Herbert	12 March 2005 (aged 20)	(Royal Spanish Football Federation) Conquense
21	GK	Sean Deane	14 April 2005 (aged 20)	(Panamanian Football Federation) Plaza Amador

=== Paraguay ===
The final 21-player squad was announced on 19 September 2025.

Head coach: Antolín Alcaraz

No.	Pos.	Player	Date of birth (age)	Club
1	GK	Facundo Insfrán	4 May 2006 (aged 19)	(Paraguayan Football Association) Olimpia
2	DF	Líder Cáceres	8 February 2005 (aged 20)	(Paraguayan Football Association) Tembetary
3	DF	Axel Balbuena	10 March 2006 (aged 19)	(Argentine Football Association) Lanús
4	DF	**Alexandro Maidana**	26 July 2005 (aged 20)	(Paraguayan Football Association) Guaraní
5	DF	Lucas Quintana	2 January 2005 (aged 20)	(Paraguayan Football Association) Cerro Porteño
6	MF	Fabrizio Baruja	12 August 2006 (aged 19)	(Paraguayan Football Association) Olimpia
7	FW	Gabriel Aguayo	10 February 2005 (aged 20)	(Paraguayan Football Association) Cerro Porteño
8	MF	Osmar Giménez	25 March 2007 (aged 18)	(Paraguayan Football Association) General Caballero JLM
9	FW	Tiago Caballero	27 May 2005 (aged 20)	(Paraguayan Football Association) Olimpia
10	FW	**Enso González**	20 January 2005 (aged 20)	(The Football Association) Wolverhampton Wanderers
11	FW	César Miño	31 May 2007 (aged 18)	(Paraguayan Football Association) Guaraní
12	GK	Víctor Rojas	1 February 2005 (aged 20)	(Paraguayan Football Association) Libertad
13	MF	Giovanni Gómez	18 October 2007 (aged 17)	(Paraguayan Football Association) Guaraní
14	DF	Tobías Morinigo	22 September 2005 (aged 20)	(Paraguayan Football Association) Olimpia
15	MF	Gadiel Paoli	1 October 2005 (aged 19)	(Argentine Football Association) Boca Juniors
16	MF	Octavio Alfonso	19 December 2005 (aged 19)	(Paraguayan Football Association) Guaraní
17	FW	Rodrigo Villalba	2 March 2006 (aged 19)	(Paraguayan Football Association) Libertad
18	MF	Lucas Guiñazú	25 August 2006 (aged 19)	(Paraguayan Football Association) Tembetary
19	FW	David Fernández	5 January 2006 (aged 19)	(Paraguayan Football Association) Sol de América
20	DF	Maximiliano Duarte	2 September 2006 (aged 19)	(Argentine Football Association) Independiente
21	GK	Francisco Mongelos	16 February 2005 (aged 20)	(Paraguayan Football Association) Sportivo Luqueño

=== South Korea ===
The final 21-player squad was announced on 8 September 2025.

Head coach: Lee Chang-won

No.	Pos.	Player	Date of birth (age)	Club
1	GK	Gong Si-hyeon	23 February 2005 (aged 20)	(Korea Football Association) Jeonbuk Hyundai Motors
2	DF	Bae Hyun-seo	16 February 2005 (aged 20)	(Korea Football Association) FC Seoul
3	DF	Kim Ho-jin	29 September 2005 (aged 19)	(Korea Football Association) Yong In University
4	DF	Ham Sun-woo	28 January 2005 (aged 20)	(Korea Football Association) Hwaseong FC
5	DF	Ko Jong-hyun	11 April 2006 (aged 19)	(Korea Football Association) Suwon Samsung Bluewings
6	MF	Son Seung-min	9 May 2005 (aged 20)	(Korea Football Association) Daegu FC
7	MF	Chung Ma-ho	14 January 2005 (aged 20)	(Korea Football Association) Chungnam Asan
8	MF	Sung Shin	13 January 2005 (aged 20)	(Korea Football Association) Bucheon FC 1995
9	FW	Baek Ga-on	23 January 2006 (aged 19)	(Korea Football Association) Busan IPark
10	MF	Kim Tae-won	1 March 2005 (aged 20)	(Portuguese Football Federation) Portimonense
11	FW	Kim Myung-jun	21 March 2006 (aged 19)	(Royal Belgian Football Association) Genk
12	GK	Hong Seong-min	29 September 2006 (aged 18)	(Korea Football Association) Pohang Steelers
13	MF	Choi Seung-gu	28 September 2005 (aged 19)	(Korea Football Association) Incheon United
14	MF	Baek Min-gyu	20 November 2005 (aged 19)	(Korea Football Association) Incheon United
15	DF	Lee Geon-hee	11 March 2005 (aged 20)	(Korea Football Association) Suwon Samsung Bluewings
16	FW	Kim Hyeon-oh	12 September 2007 (aged 18)	(Korea Football Association) Daejeon Hana Citizen
17	MF	Kim Hyun-min	30 July 2006 (aged 19)	(Korea Football Association) Busan IPark
18	MF	Choi Byung-wook	11 April 2005 (aged 20)	(Korea Football Association) Jeju SK
19	DF	Lim Jun-young	14 November 2005 (aged 19)	(Korea Football Association) Chungbuk Cheongju
20	DF	Shin Min-ha	15 September 2005 (aged 20)	(Korea Football Association) Gangwon FC
21	GK	Park Sang-young	17 September 2005 (aged 20)	(Korea Football Association) Daegu FC

=== Ukraine ===
The final 21-player squad was announced on 16 September 2025.

Head coach: Dmytro Mykhaylenko

No.	Pos.	Player	Date of birth (age)	Club
1	GK	Svyatoslav Vanivskyi	27 February 2005 (aged 20)	(Polish Football Association) Stal Rzeszów
2	MF	Vitaliy Katrych	17 February 2005 (aged 20)	(Ukrainian Association of Football) Inhulets Petrovo
3	DF	Kyrylo Dihtyar	25 November 2007 (aged 17)	(Ukrainian Association of Football) Metalist Kharkiv
4	DF	Mykola Kyrychok	16 May 2006 (aged 19)	(Ukrainian Association of Football) Karpaty Lviv
5	DF	Vladyslav Kysil	14 June 2005 (aged 20)	(Royal Spanish Football Federation) Ponferradina
6	DF	Maksym Melnychenko	12 February 2005 (aged 20)	(Ukrainian Association of Football) Polissya Zhytomyr
7	MF	Artur Shakh	11 May 2005 (aged 20)	(Ukrainian Association of Football) Karpaty Lviv
8	MF	Daniil Vashchenko	2 October 2005 (aged 19)	(Ukrainian Association of Football) Oleksandriya
9	FW	**Matviy Ponomarenko**	11 January 2006 (aged 19)	(Ukrainian Association of Football) Dynamo Kyiv
10	MF	**Hennadiy Synchuk**	10 July 2006 (aged 19)	(Canadian Soccer Association) CF Montréal
11	MF	Danylo Krevsun	21 April 2005 (aged 20)	(German Football Association) Borussia Dortmund
12	GK	Vladyslav Krapyvtsov	25 June 2005 (aged 20)	(Royal Spanish Football Federation) Girona
13	DF	Daniel Vernattus	9 February 2006 (aged 19)	(Ukrainian Association of Football) Metalist Kharkiv
14	MF	Kristian Shevchenko	10 November 2006 (aged 18)	(The Football Association) Watford
15	MF	Yaroslav Karaman	8 June 2006 (aged 19)	(Ukrainian Association of Football) Polissya Zhytomyr
16	GK	Markiyan Bakus	20 January 2006 (aged 19)	(Ukrainian Association of Football) LNZ Cherkasy
17	DF	Maksym Derkach	22 February 2005 (aged 20)	(Latvian Football Federation) Tukums 2000
18	MF	Bohdan Budko	7 January 2006 (aged 19)	(Royal Dutch Football Association) AZ
19	FW	Oleksandr Pyshchur	24 January 2005 (aged 20)	(Hungarian Football Federation) Győri ETO
20	DF	Oleksiy Husyev	16 March 2005 (aged 20)	(Ukrainian Association of Football) Kudrivka
21	MF	Matviy Panchenko	4 February 2006 (aged 19)	(Ukrainian Association of Football) Metalist 1925 Kharkiv

== Group C ==
=== Brazil ===
A preliminary 26-player squad was announced on 27 August 2025. On 5 September, Nathan Fernandes withdrew from the squad due to injury. The final 21-player squad was announced on 18 September 2025. A few days later, Felipe Longo was cut at the request of his club, Corinthians, and Pedro Cobra was called up to replace him.

Head coach: Ramon Menezes

No.	Pos.	Player	Date of birth (age)	Club
1	GK	Pedro Cobra	15 May 2006 (aged 19)	(Brazilian Football Confederation) Atlético Mineiro
2	DF	Igor Serrote	1 March 2005 (aged 20)	(United Arab Emirates Football Association) Al Jazira
3	DF	Iago Teodoro	18 April 2005 (aged 20)	(Brazilian Football Confederation) Flamengo
4	DF	Bruno Alves	4 August 2005 (aged 20)	(Brazilian Football Confederation) Cruzeiro
5	MF	Rayan Lucas	3 January 2005 (aged 20)	(Portuguese Football Federation) Sporting CP
6	DF	Leandrinho	17 March 2005 (aged 20)	(Brazilian Football Confederation) Vasco da Gama
7	FW	Gustavo Prado	6 June 2005 (aged 20)	(Brazilian Football Confederation) Internacional
8	MF	João Cruz	12 May 2006 (aged 19)	(Brazilian Football Confederation) Athletico Paranaense
9	FW	Deivid Washington	5 June 2005 (aged 20)	(The Football Association) Chelsea
10	FW	Pedrinho	5 February 2006 (aged 19)	(Russian Football Union) Zenit Saint Petersburg
11	FW	Wesley	5 March 2005 (aged 20)	(Saudi Arabian Football Federation) Al-Nassr
12	GK	**Otávio**	27 December 2005 (aged 19)	(Brazilian Football Confederation) Cruzeiro
13	DF	Gilberto	27 March 2005 (aged 20)	(Brazilian Football Confederation) Palmeiras
14	DF	João Victor	1 January 2007 (aged 18)	(Brazilian Football Confederation) Flamengo
15	MF	Rafael Coutinho	24 March 2006 (aged 19)	(Brazilian Football Confederation) Palmeiras
16	DF	Léo Derik	24 July 2005 (aged 20)	(Brazilian Football Confederation) Athletico Paranaense
17	MF	Rhuan Gabriel	6 February 2006 (aged 19)	(Brazilian Football Confederation) Cruzeiro
18	MF	Murilo Rhikman	13 March 2006 (aged 19)	(Brazilian Football Confederation) Cruzeiro
19	FW	Luighi	30 April 2006 (aged 19)	(Brazilian Football Confederation) Palmeiras
20	FW	Erick Belé	21 January 2007 (aged 18)	(Brazilian Football Confederation) Palmeiras
21	GK	Lucas Furtado	9 March 2005 (aged 20)	(Portuguese Football Federation) Vitória de Guimarães

=== Mexico ===
The final 21-player squad was announced on 10 September 2025.

Head coach: Eduardo Arce

No.	Pos.	Player	Date of birth (age)	Club
1	GK	Emmanuel Ochoa	5 May 2005 (aged 20)	(Mexican Football Federation) Cruz Azul
2	DF	**Everardo López**	23 March 2005 (aged 20)	(Mexican Football Federation) Toluca
3	DF	Rodrigo Pachuca	24 July 2005 (aged 20)	(Mexican Football Federation) Puebla
4	DF	Diego Ochoa	20 April 2005 (aged 20)	(Mexican Football Federation) Juárez
5	MF	**Iker Fimbres**	2 June 2005 (aged 20)	(Mexican Football Federation) Monterrey
6	MF	César Garza	1 July 2005 (aged 20)	(Scottish Football Association) Dundee
7	MF	Alexéi Domínguez	3 January 2005 (aged 20)	(Mexican Football Federation) Pachuca
8	MF	Elías Montiel	7 October 2005 (aged 19)	(Mexican Football Federation) Pachuca
9	FW	Oswaldo Virgen	7 April 2005 (aged 20)	(Mexican Football Federation) Toluca
10	FW	Yael Padilla	19 December 2005 (aged 19)	(Mexican Football Federation) Guadalajara
11	FW	**Gilberto Mora**	14 October 2008 (aged 16)	(Mexican Football Federation) Tijuana
12	GK	Pablo Lara	29 June 2005 (aged 20)	(Mexican Football Federation) UNAM
13	GK	Juan Sebastián Liceaga	11 April 2007 (aged 18)	(Mexican Football Federation) Guadalajara
14	MF	Amaury Morales	3 December 2005 (aged 19)	(Mexican Football Federation) Cruz Azul
15	DF	César Bustos	27 August 2005 (aged 20)	(Mexican Football Federation) Monterrey
16	DF	Jaziel Mendoza	20 May 2005 (aged 20)	(Mexican Football Federation) Cruz Azul
17	MF	Diego Sánchez	12 April 2005 (aged 20)	(Mexican Football Federation) UANL
18	MF	**Obed Vargas**	5 August 2005 (aged 20)	(United States Soccer Federation) Seattle Sounders FC
19	FW	Mateo Levy	22 October 2006 (aged 18)	(Mexican Football Federation) Cruz Azul
20	FW	**Hugo Camberos**	21 January 2007 (aged 18)	(Mexican Football Federation) Guadalajara
21	FW	Tahiel Jiménez	22 January 2006 (aged 19)	(Mexican Football Federation) Santos Laguna

=== Morocco ===
The final 21-player squad was announced on 19 September 2025. On 27 September 2025, Ilyass Mahsoub was called-up to replace Hamza Koutoune who was withdrawn due to his club, Annecy, refusing to release him for the tournament.

Head coach: Mohamed Ouahbi

No.	Pos.	Player	Date of birth (age)	Club
1	GK	Yanis Benchaouch	10 April 2006 (aged 19)	(French Football Federation) Monaco
2	DF	Ilyass Mahsoub	19 May 2005 (aged 20)	(Royal Moroccan Football Federation) USM Oujda
3	DF	**Ali Maamar**	23 March 2005 (aged 20)	(Royal Belgian Football Association) Anderlecht
4	DF	**Ismaël Baouf**	17 September 2006 (aged 19)	(Royal Dutch Football Association) Cambuur
5	MF	Anas Tajaouart	7 September 2005 (aged 20)	(Royal Belgian Football Association) Anderlecht
6	MF	Naïm Byar	23 February 2005 (aged 20)	(Italian Football Federation) Foggia
7	FW	**Othmane Maamma**	6 October 2005 (aged 19)	(The Football Association) Watford
8	MF	Houssam Essadak	30 July 2005 (aged 20)	(Royal Moroccan Football Federation) Union Touarga
9	FW	Younes El Bahraoui	4 January 2005 (aged 20)	(Royal Moroccan Football Federation) KAC Marrakech
10	FW	Saad El Haddad	24 July 2005 (aged 20)	(Italian Football Federation) Venezia
11	FW	Ilias Boumassaoudi	14 January 2005 (aged 20)	(Royal Dutch Football Association) Den Bosch
12	GK	Ibrahim Gomis	20 March 2005 (aged 20)	(French Football Federation) Marseille
13	FW	Taha Majni	11 October 2007 (aged 17)	(Royal Moroccan Football Federation) Union Touarga
14	FW	Mohamed Hamony	5 August 2006 (aged 19)	(Royal Spanish Football Federation) Girona
15	DF	**Fouad Zahouani**	18 April 2006 (aged 19)	(Royal Moroccan Football Federation) Union Touarga
16	GK	Hakim Mesbahi	7 September 2005 (aged 20)	(Royal Moroccan Football Federation) AS FAR
17	FW	**Gessime Yassine**	22 November 2005 (aged 19)	(French Football Federation) Dunkerque
18	MF	Yassine Khalifi	9 August 2005 (aged 20)	(Royal Belgian Football Association) Charleroi
19	DF	Smail Bakhty	29 November 2006 (aged 18)	(Austrian Football Association) Sturm Graz
20	DF	Mohammed Kebdani	13 May 2005 (aged 20)	(Royal Moroccan Football Federation) AS FAR
21	FW	**Yassir Zabiri**	23 February 2005 (aged 20)	(Portuguese Football Federation) Famalicão
22	GK	Ilyass Motik	10 December 2005 (aged 19)	(Royal Moroccan Football Federation) Hassania Agadir

=== Spain ===
A preliminary 24-player squad was announced on 28 August 2025. On 4 September, Matias Fernandez-Pardo withdrew from the squad. The final 21-player squad was announced on 17 September 2025. On 27 September, Jon Martín withdrew due to injury and Álvaro Cortés was called up to replace him.

Head coach: Paco Gallardo

No.	Pos.	Player	Date of birth (age)	Club
1	GK	Fran González	24 June 2005 (aged 20)	(Royal Spanish Football Federation) Real Madrid
2	DF	Pau Navarro	25 April 2005 (aged 20)	(Royal Spanish Football Federation) Villarreal
3	DF	Julio Díaz	10 January 2005 (aged 20)	(Royal Spanish Football Federation) Atlético Madrid
4	DF	Álvaro Cortés	17 March 2005 (aged 20)	(Royal Spanish Football Federation) Barcelona
5	DF	Andrés Cuenca	11 June 2007 (aged 18)	(Royal Spanish Football Federation) Barcelona
6	MF	Izan Merino	15 April 2006 (aged 19)	(Royal Spanish Football Federation) Málaga
7	MF	Rayane Belaid	11 February 2005 (aged 20)	(Royal Spanish Football Federation) Atlético Madrid
8	MF	Rodri Mendoza	15 March 2005 (aged 20)	(Royal Spanish Football Federation) Elche
9	FW	Adrián Liso	2 April 2005 (aged 20)	(Royal Spanish Football Federation) Getafe
10	FW	Iker Bravo	13 January 2005 (aged 20)	(Italian Football Federation) Udinese
11	FW	David Mella	23 May 2005 (aged 20)	(Royal Spanish Football Federation) Deportivo La Coruña
12	MF	Thiago Pitarch	3 August 2007 (aged 18)	(Royal Spanish Football Federation) Real Madrid
13	GK	Raúl Jiménez	16 February 2006 (aged 19)	(Royal Spanish Football Federation) Valencia
14	FW	Joel Roca	7 June 2005 (aged 20)	(Royal Spanish Football Federation) Girona
15	MF	Cristian David	17 August 2005 (aged 20)	(Royal Spanish Football Federation) Real Madrid
16	DF	Jesús Fortea	26 March 2007 (aged 18)	(Royal Spanish Football Federation) Real Madrid
17	FW	Pablo García	13 June 2006 (aged 19)	(Royal Spanish Football Federation) Real Betis
18	MF	Peio Canales	17 January 2005 (aged 20)	(Royal Spanish Football Federation) Racing Santander
19	FW	Jan Virgili	26 July 2006 (aged 19)	(Royal Spanish Football Federation) Mallorca
20	DF	Diego Aguado	7 February 2007 (aged 18)	(Royal Spanish Football Federation) Real Madrid
21	GK	Vicent Abril	15 February 2005 (aged 20)	(Royal Spanish Football Federation) Valencia

== Group D ==
=== Argentina ===
The final 21-player squad was announced on 18 September 2025.

Head coach: Diego Placente

No.	Pos.	Player	Date of birth (age)	Club
1	GK	Santino Barbi	14 June 2005 (aged 20)	(Argentine Football Association) Talleres
2	DF	Tobías Ramírez	11 November 2006 (aged 18)	(Argentine Football Association) Argentinos Juniors
3	DF	Julio Soler	16 February 2005 (aged 20)	(The Football Association) Bournemouth
4	DF	Dylan Gorosito	3 February 2006 (aged 19)	(Argentine Football Association) Boca Juniors
5	MF	Milton Delgado	16 June 2005 (aged 20)	(Argentine Football Association) Boca Juniors
6	DF	Juan Villalba	15 March 2006 (aged 19)	(Argentine Football Association) Gimnasia (LP)
7	FW	Maher Carrizo	19 February 2006 (aged 19)	(Argentine Football Association) Vélez Sarsfield
8	MF	Valentino Acuña	27 January 2006 (aged 19)	(Argentine Football Association) Newell's Old Boys
9	FW	Alejo Sarco	6 January 2006 (aged 19)	(German Football Association) Bayer Leverkusen
10	MF	Álvaro Montoro	17 April 2007 (aged 18)	(Brazilian Football Confederation) Botafogo
11	MF	Ian Subiabre	1 January 2007 (aged 18)	(Argentine Football Association) River Plate
12	GK	Álvaro Busso	11 October 2006 (aged 18)	(Argentine Football Association) Vélez Sarsfield
13	DF	Valente Pierani	22 February 2006 (aged 19)	(Argentine Football Association) Estudiantes (LP)
14	DF	Santiago Fernández	3 March 2005 (aged 20)	(Argentine Football Association) Talleres
15	MF	Tomás Pérez	26 August 2005 (aged 20)	(Portuguese Football Federation) Porto
16	DF	Teo Rodríguez Pagano	12 October 2005 (aged 19)	(Argentine Football Association) San Lorenzo
17	MF	Mateo Silvetti	14 January 2006 (aged 19)	(United States Soccer Federation) Inter Miami CF
18	MF	Tobías Andrada	2 February 2007 (aged 18)	(Argentine Football Association) Vélez Sarsfield
19	MF	Santino Andino	25 October 2005 (aged 19)	(Argentine Football Association) Godoy Cruz
20	MF	**Gianluca Prestianni**	31 January 2006 (aged 19)	(Portuguese Football Federation) Benfica
21	GK	Alain Gómez	3 March 2007 (aged 18)	(Royal Spanish Football Federation) Valencia

=== Australia ===
A preliminary 23-player squad was announced on 11 September 2025. The final 21-player squad was announced two weeks later. Nathan Amanatidis was withdrawn due to injury.

Head coach: Trevor Morgan

No.	Pos.	Player	Date of birth (age)	Club
1	GK	Steven Hall	16 January 2005 (aged 20)	(The Football Association) Brighton & Hove Albion
2	MF	Daniel Bennie	13 April 2006 (aged 19)	(The Football Association) Queens Park Rangers
3	DF	Sebastian Esposito	21 April 2005 (aged 20)	(Football Australia) Melbourne Victory
4	DF	Panagiotis Kikianis	8 March 2005 (aged 20)	(Football Australia) Adelaide United
5	DF	Fabian Talladira	4 February 2006 (aged 19)	(Football Australia) Adelaide United
6	MF	**Paul Okon-Engstler**	24 January 2005 (aged 20)	(Football Australia) Sydney FC
7	MF	Jonny Yull	5 March 2005 (aged 20)	(Football Australia) Adelaide United
8	MF	Alexander Badolato	23 February 2005 (aged 20)	(Football Australia) Newcastle Jets
9	FW	Luka Jovanović	20 May 2005 (aged 20)	(Football Australia) Adelaide United
10	MF	Rhys Youlley	13 February 2005 (aged 20)	(Football Australia) Sydney FC
11	FW	Musa Touré	12 November 2005 (aged 19)	(Danish Football Association) Randers
12	GK	Alexander Robinson	9 March 2005 (aged 20)	(Football Australia) Macarthur FC
13	DF	**Lucas Herrington**	6 March 2007 (aged 18)	(Football Australia) Brisbane Roar
14	FW	Tiago Quintal	16 June 2006 (aged 19)	(Football Australia) Sydney FC
15	MF	Jaylan Pearman	18 April 2006 (aged 19)	(The Football Association) Queens Park Rangers
16	DF	Joshua Inserra	21 January 2005 (aged 20)	(Football Australia) Melbourne Victory
17	DF	Liam Bonetig	20 August 2005 (aged 20)	(Football Australia) Melbourne City
18	GK	Daniel Graskoski	28 January 2007 (aged 18)	(Football Australia) Melbourne Victory
19	FW	Max Caputo	17 August 2005 (aged 20)	(Football Australia) Melbourne City
20	MF	Louis Agosti	2 March 2005 (aged 20)	(Italian Football Federation) Dolomiti Bellunesi
21	DF	James Overy	9 November 2007 (aged 17)	(The Football Association) Manchester United

=== Cuba ===
The final 21-player squad was announced on 22 September 2025.

Head coach: Pedro Pablo Pereira

No.	Pos.	Player	Date of birth (age)	Club
1	GK	Yorlan Urgellés	23 February 2005 (aged 20)	(Football Association of Cuba) Guantánamo
2	DF	**Elvis Casanova**	17 September 2005 (aged 20)	(Costa Rican Football Federation) Consultants
3	DF	Ricardo Polo	14 May 2005 (aged 20)	(National Autonomous Federation of Football of Honduras) Santa Rosa
4	DF	**Camilo Pinillo**	21 February 2005 (aged 20)	(Royal Belgian Football Association) Lierse
5	DF	**Karel Pérez**	25 August 2005 (aged 20)	(Portuguese Football Federation) Vianense
6	DF	**Diego Catasus**	3 April 2005 (aged 20)	(Italian Football Federation) Latina
7	FW	Jade Quiñones	23 September 2007 (aged 18)	(Football Association of Cuba) La Habana
8	DF	**Leandro Mena**	3 February 2005 (aged 20)	(Costa Rican Football Federation) Escorpiones de Belén
9	FW	**Alessio Raballo**	9 September 2006 (aged 19)	(Italian Football Federation) Cremonese
10	FW	**Michael Camejo**	17 March 2005 (aged 20)	(Costa Rican Football Federation) Santa Cruz
11	MF	**Romario Torres**	9 February 2005 (aged 20)	(Costa Rican Football Federation) Jicaral
12	GK	**Yurdy Hodelín**	23 September 2005 (aged 20)	(Costa Rican Football Federation) Consultants
13	MF	Didier Reinoso	31 March 2007 (aged 18)	(Football Association of Cuba) La Habana
14	MF	Maikol Vega	12 September 2006 (aged 19)	(Costa Rican Football Federation) Inter San Carlos
15	MF	**Marcos Campos**	15 November 2005 (aged 19)	(Costa Rican Football Federation) Consultants
16	MF	Norlys Chávez	28 June 2005 (aged 20)	(Costa Rican Football Federation) Rosario
17	DF	**Aniel Casanova**	17 September 2005 (aged 20)	(Football Association of Cuba) Villa Clara
18	FW	Yordan Castañer	23 February 2005 (aged 20)	(Football Association of Cuba) La Habana
19	FW	Enmanuel Torres	10 February 2005 (aged 20)	(Football Association of Cuba) Santiago de Cuba
20	MF	Samuel Rodríguez	25 January 2005 (aged 20)	(Football Association of Cuba) Sancti Spiritus
21	GK	Yurixander Zayas	3 March 2007 (aged 18)	(Football Association of Cuba) Ciego de Ávila

=== Italy ===
The final 21-player squad was announced on 18 September 2025.

Head coach: Carmine Nunziata

No.	Pos.	Player	Date of birth (age)	Club
1	GK	Alessandro Nunziante	14 March 2007 (aged 18)	(Italian Football Federation) Udinese
2	DF	Javison Idele	23 January 2007 (aged 18)	(Italian Football Federation) Atalanta
3	DF	Cristian Cama	5 June 2007 (aged 18)	(Italian Football Federation) Roma
4	DF	Christian Corradi	21 February 2005 (aged 20)	(Italian Football Federation) Trento
5	DF	Andrea Natali	28 January 2008 (aged 17)	(Royal Dutch Football Association) AZ
6	DF	Wisdom Amey	11 August 2005 (aged 20)	(Italian Football Federation) Pianese
7	MF	Jacopo Sardo	8 March 2005 (aged 20)	(Italian Football Federation) Monza
8	MF	Mattia Mannini	8 July 2006 (aged 19)	(Italian Football Federation) Juve Stabia
9	FW	Ismaël Konaté	29 March 2006 (aged 19)	(Italian Football Federation) Empoli
10	FW	Marco Romano	1 March 2006 (aged 19)	(Italian Football Federation) Genoa
11	FW	Mattia Mosconi	26 March 2007 (aged 18)	(Italian Football Federation) Inter Milan
12	GK	Jacopo Seghetti	17 February 2005 (aged 20)	(Italian Football Federation) Livorno
13	DF	Emanuel Benjamín	14 July 2007 (aged 18)	(Royal Spanish Football Federation) Real Madrid
14	MF	Emanuele Sala	28 November 2007 (aged 17)	(Italian Football Federation) Milan
15	DF	Francesco Verde	21 February 2007 (aged 18)	(Italian Football Federation) Juventus
16	MF	Alessandro Berretta	1 July 2006 (aged 19)	(Italian Football Federation) Giana Erminio
17	FW	Jamal Iddrissou	22 September 2007 (aged 18)	(Italian Football Federation) Inter Milan
18	GK	Lapo Siviero	23 November 2006 (aged 18)	(Italian Football Federation) Torino
19	FW	Alvin Okoro	26 March 2005 (aged 20)	(Italian Football Federation) Juventus
20	FW	Mattia Liberali	6 April 2007 (aged 18)	(Italian Football Federation) Catanzaro
21	MF	Lorenzo Riccio	25 July 2006 (aged 19)	(Italian Football Federation) Atalanta

== Group E ==
=== France ===
A preliminary 24-player squad was announced on 28 August 2025. The final 21-player squad was announced on 19 September 2025.

Head coach: Bernard Diomède

No.	Pos.	Player	Date of birth (age)	Club
1	GK	Lisandru Olmeta	21 July 2005 (aged 20)	(French Football Federation) Bastia
2	DF	Gady Beyuku	23 November 2005 (aged 19)	(Italian Football Federation) Modena
3	DF	Justin Bourgault	14 September 2005 (aged 20)	(French Football Federation) Brest
4	DF	Steven Baseya	14 January 2005 (aged 20)	(Portuguese Football Federation) Alverca
5	DF	Elyaz Zidane	26 December 2005 (aged 19)	(Royal Spanish Football Federation) Real Betis
6	MF	Ilan Touré	4 August 2006 (aged 19)	(French Football Federation) Monaco
7	FW	Lucas Michal	22 June 2005 (aged 20)	(French Football Federation) Monaco
8	MF	Rabby Nzingoula	25 November 2005 (aged 19)	(French Football Federation) Strasbourg
9	FW	Saïmon Bouabré	1 June 2006 (aged 19)	(Saudi Arabian Football Federation) Neom
10	MF	Mayssam Benama	9 March 2005 (aged 20)	(French Football Federation) Annecy
11	FW	Tadjidine Mmadi	3 March 2007 (aged 18)	(French Football Federation) Marseille
12	DF	Anthony Bermont	10 February 2005 (aged 20)	(French Football Federation) Lens
13	FW	Moustapha Dabo	20 August 2007 (aged 18)	(French Football Federation) Nantes
14	DF	Noham Kamara	22 January 2007 (aged 18)	(French Football Federation) Paris Saint-Germain
15	DF	Nathan Zézé	18 June 2005 (aged 20)	(Saudi Arabian Football Federation) Neom
16	GK	Tao Paradowski	15 January 2005 (aged 20)	(French Football Federation) Pau
17	MF	Andréa Le Borgne	27 July 2006 (aged 19)	(Italian Football Federation) Como
18	FW	Gabin Bernardeau	24 January 2006 (aged 19)	(French Football Federation) Nice
19	MF	Fodé Sylla	16 April 2006 (aged 19)	(French Football Federation) Lens
20	FW	Djylian N'Guessan	30 August 2008 (aged 17)	(French Football Federation) Saint-Étienne
21	GK	Justin Bengui	9 July 2005 (aged 20)	(Royal Belgian Football Association) RWDM

=== New Caledonia ===
The final 21-player squad was announced on 4 September 2025.

Head coach: Pierre Wajoka

No.	Pos.	Player	Date of birth (age)	Club
1	GK	Noa Bouchet Muller	20 August 2007 (aged 18)	(French Football Federation) Cavigal Nice
2	DF	Tamumue Ajapuhnya	12 April 2005 (aged 20)	(New Caledonian Football Federation) Lössi
3	DF	Lomani Nahiet	12 March 2005 (aged 20)	(New Caledonian Football Federation) Hienghène Sport
4	DF	Wadria Hanye	17 December 2006 (aged 18)	(New Caledonian Football Federation) Tiga Sport
5	DF	Kandjo Teanyouen	25 June 2005 (aged 20)	(New Caledonian Football Federation) Bélep Mont-Dore
6	MF	Joseph Hnaissilin	19 March 2006 (aged 19)	(New Caledonian Football Federation) Lössi
7	MF	Kapone Xulue	7 September 2005 (aged 20)	(New Caledonian Football Federation) Mont-Dore
8	MF	Antony Levy	23 October 2006 (aged 18)	(New Caledonian Football Federation) Bélep Mont-Dore
9	FW	Louis Brunet	28 April 2005 (aged 20)	Free agent
10	FW	Antoine Simane	12 August 2005 (aged 20)	(New Caledonian Football Federation) Magenta
11	FW	Kemejie Wawalahae	16 April 2005 (aged 20)	(New Caledonian Football Federation) Wetr
12	MF	Jytrhim Upa	2 October 2006 (aged 18)	(New Caledonian Football Federation) Tiga Sport
13	MF	Damien Ujicas	30 October 2006 (aged 18)	(New Caledonian Football Federation) Magenta
14	FW	Nolhann Alebate	10 July 2006 (aged 19)	(French Football Federation) Bastia
15	DF	Yann Wahaga	9 May 2005 (aged 20)	(New Caledonian Football Federation) Hienghène Sport
16	GK	Gale Wathiepel	6 March 2005 (aged 20)	(New Caledonian Football Federation) Ne Drehu
17	MF	Patrick Ouka	13 June 2005 (aged 20)	(New Caledonian Football Federation) Gaïca
18	MF	Evans Vakie	5 June 2006 (aged 19)	(New Caledonian Football Federation) Kunié
19	MF	Yazid Wajoka	14 March 2006 (aged 19)	(New Caledonian Football Federation) Magenta
20	DF	Timotei Zeter	12 December 2006 (aged 18)	(New Caledonian Football Federation) Hienghène Sport
21	GK	Emmanuel Wahnapo	23 May 2005 (aged 20)	(New Caledonian Football Federation) Wetr

=== South Africa ===
The final 21-player squad was announced on 18 September 2025.

Head coach: Raymond Mdaka

No.	Pos.	Player	Date of birth (age)	Club
1	GK	Fletcher Smythe-Lowe	2 February 2007 (aged 18)	(Portuguese Football Federation) Estoril
2	DF	Sfiso Timba	28 March 2006 (aged 19)	(South African Football Association) Kaizer Chiefs
3	DF	Neo Rapoo	12 August 2005 (aged 20)	(South African Football Association) Siwelele
4	MF	Patrick Autata	5 January 2005 (aged 20)	(South African Football Association) Durban City
5	DF	Asekho Tiwani	10 May 2005 (aged 20)	(South African Football Association) Mamelodi Sundowns
6	DF	Siviwe Nkwali	15 May 2005 (aged 20)	(South African Football Association) Stellenbosch
7	FW	Shakeel April	1 December 2005 (aged 19)	(South African Football Association) Cape Town City
8	MF	Gomolemo Kekana	7 July 2006 (aged 19)	(South African Football Association) Mamelodi Sundowns
9	FW	Jody Ah Shene	1 February 2005 (aged 20)	(South African Football Association) Cape Town City
10	MF	Mfundo Vilakazi	19 November 2005 (aged 19)	(South African Football Association) Kaizer Chiefs
11	FW	Kutlwano Letlhaku	25 March 2006 (aged 19)	(South African Football Association) Mamelodi Sundowns
12	FW	Thabang Mahlangu	31 July 2005 (aged 20)	(South African Football Association) Siwelele
13	FW	Luke Baartman	12 June 2006 (aged 19)	(South African Football Association) Kaizer Chiefs
14	DF	**Tylon Smith**	9 May 2005 (aged 20)	(The Football Association) Queens Park Rangers
15	MF	Lazola Maku	10 April 2007 (aged 18)	(South African Football Association) Siwelele
16	GK	Kgoleng Ratisani	29 April 2006 (aged 19)	(South African Football Association) Sekhukhune United
17	FW	Langelihle Phili	21 January 2005 (aged 20)	(South African Football Association) Stellenbosch
18	FW	Siyabonga Mabena	18 February 2007 (aged 18)	(South African Football Association) Mamelodi Sundowns
19	DF	Thato Sibiya	23 June 2006 (aged 19)	(South African Football Association) Mamelodi Sundowns
20	GK	Takalani Mazhamba	30 May 2007 (aged 18)	(South African Football Association) Kaizer Chiefs
21	FW	Siviwe Magidigidi	1 July 2005 (aged 20)	(South African Football Association) Siwelele

=== United States ===
A preliminary 23-player squad was announced on 28 August 2025. The final 21-player squad was announced on 19 September 2025. On 27 September, Diego Kochen withdrew due to being recalled by his club Barcelona and was replaced by Gavin Beavers.

Head coach: (Serbia) Marko Mitrović

No.	Pos.	Player	Date of birth (age)	Club
1	GK	Gavin Beavers	29 April 2005 (aged 20)	(Danish Football Association) Brøndby
2	DF	Reed Baker-Whiting	31 March 2005 (aged 20)	(United States Soccer Federation) Seattle Sounders FC
3	DF	Nolan Norris	17 February 2005 (aged 20)	(United States Soccer Federation) FC Dallas
4	DF	Joshua Wynder	2 May 2005 (aged 20)	(Portuguese Football Federation) Benfica
5	DF	Noah Cobb	20 July 2005 (aged 20)	(United States Soccer Federation) Colorado Rapids
6	MF	**Brooklyn Raines**	11 March 2005 (aged 20)	(United States Soccer Federation) Houston Dynamo FC
7	FW	**Cole Campbell**	20 February 2006 (aged 19)	(German Football Association) Borussia Dortmund
8	MF	**Benjamin Cremaschi**	2 March 2005 (aged 20)	(Italian Football Federation) Parma
9	FW	Marcos Zambrano	20 January 2005 (aged 20)	(United States Soccer Federation) Real Salt Lake
10	MF	Niko Tsakiris	19 June 2005 (aged 20)	(United States Soccer Federation) San Jose Earthquakes
11	FW	Luke Brennan	24 February 2005 (aged 20)	(United States Soccer Federation) Atlanta United FC
12	GK	Adam Beaudry	18 April 2006 (aged 19)	(United States Soccer Federation) Colorado Rapids
13	DF	**Peyton Miller**	8 November 2007 (aged 17)	(United States Soccer Federation) New England Revolution
14	MF	Taha Habroune	5 February 2006 (aged 19)	(United States Soccer Federation) Columbus Crew
15	MF	Pedro Soma	30 June 2006 (aged 19)	(United States Soccer Federation) San Diego FC
16	DF	Ethan Kohler	20 May 2005 (aged 20)	(German Football Association) SC Verl
17	DF	**Frankie Westfield**	9 December 2005 (aged 19)	(United States Soccer Federation) Philadelphia Union
18	DF	Luca Bombino	10 July 2006 (aged 19)	(United States Soccer Federation) San Diego FC
19	MF	Matthew Corcoran	17 February 2006 (aged 19)	(United States Soccer Federation) Nashville SC
20	FW	**Zavier Gozo**	22 March 2007 (aged 18)	(United States Soccer Federation) Real Salt Lake
21	GK	Duran Ferree	28 September 2006 (aged 18)	(United States Soccer Federation) San Diego FC

== Group F ==
=== Colombia ===
The final 21-player squad was announced on 22 September 2025.

Head coach: César Torres

No.	Pos.	Player	Date of birth (age)	Club
1	GK	Jordan García	20 June 2005 (aged 20)	(Colombian Football Federation) Fortaleza
2	DF	Simón García	11 January 2005 (aged 20)	(Colombian Football Federation) Atlético Nacional
3	DF	Carlos Sarabia	13 June 2005 (aged 20)	(Colombian Football Federation) Millonarios
4	DF	Julián Bazán	25 November 2005 (aged 19)	(Colombian Football Federation) Deportivo Pereira
5	DF	Weimar Vivas	17 October 2006 (aged 18)	(Brazilian Football Confederation) Red Bull Bragantino
6	MF	Elkin Rivero	27 February 2006 (aged 19)	(Colombian Football Federation) Atlético Nacional
7	MF	Luis Miguel Landázuri	20 November 2005 (aged 19)	(Colombian Football Federation) Atlético Nacional
8	MF	Royner Benítez	21 June 2005 (aged 20)	(Colombian Football Federation) Águilas Doradas
9	FW	Emilio Aristizábal	5 August 2005 (aged 20)	(Colombian Football Federation) Fortaleza
10	FW	**Óscar Perea**	27 September 2005 (aged 20)	(Portuguese Football Federation) AVS
11	FW	Jhon Rentería	24 October 2005 (aged 19)	(Argentine Football Association) Sarmiento
12	GK	Alexéi Rojas	28 September 2005 (aged 19)	(The Football Association) Arsenal
13	GK	Luis Eduardo Mena	9 January 2005 (aged 20)	(Colombian Football Federation) Atlético Huila
14	MF	Jordan Barrera	11 April 2006 (aged 19)	(Brazilian Football Confederation) Botafogo
15	DF	Yeimar Mosquera	6 February 2005 (aged 20)	(The Football Association) Aston Villa
16	MF	Joel Romero	9 January 2006 (aged 19)	(Colombian Football Federation) América de Cali
17	DF	**Juan David Arizala**	10 October 2005 (aged 19)	(Colombian Football Federation) Independiente Medellín
18	MF	José Cavadia	21 September 2005 (aged 20)	(Colombian Football Federation) América de Cali
19	MF	Kener González	5 October 2005 (aged 19)	(Colombian Football Federation) América de Cali
20	FW	Joel Canchimbo	12 August 2005 (aged 20)	(Colombian Football Federation) Atlético Junior
21	FW	Néiser Villarreal	24 April 2005 (aged 20)	(Colombian Football Federation) Millonarios

=== Nigeria ===
The final 21-player squad was announced on 15 September 2025. On 25 September 2025, Marvelous Freedom withdrew from the squad due to a knee injury and was replaced by Haruna Aliyu.

Head coach: Aliyu Zubair

No.	Pos.	Player	Date of birth (age)	Club
1	GK	**Ebenezer Harcourt**	21 October 2009 (aged 15)	(Nigeria Football Federation) Sporting Lagos
2	DF	Amos Ochoche	22 March 2006 (aged 19)	(French Football Federation) Reims
3	DF	Odinaka Okoro	11 December 2006 (aged 18)	(Nigeria Football Federation) Sporting Lagos
4	MF	Daniel Daga	10 January 2007 (aged 18)	(Norwegian Football Federation) Molde
5	DF	Ahmed Akinyele	15 June 2005 (aged 20)	(Nigeria Football Federation) Remo Stars
6	DF	**Daniel Bameyi**	4 January 2006 (aged 19)	(Football Association of Slovenia) Primorje
7	FW	Suleman Sani	1 September 2006 (aged 19)	(Slovak Football Association) Trenčín
8	MF	Abduljelil Kamaldeen	9 September 2009 (aged 16)	(Nigeria Football Federation) Kwara Football Academy
9	FW	Kparobo Arierhi	11 January 2007 (aged 18)	(Norwegian Football Federation) Mjøndalen
10	MF	Israel Ayuma	8 August 2005 (aged 20)	(Croatian Football Federation) Istra 1961
11	MF	Orseer Achihi	19 September 2006 (aged 19)	(Royal Belgian Football Association) Antwerp
12	FW	Salihu Nasiru	1 October 2006 (aged 18)	(Association of Football Federations of Azerbaijan) Qabala
13	DF	Azuka Alatan	6 April 2006 (aged 19)	(Nigeria Football Federation) 36 Lion
14	MF	Emmanuel Ekele	7 February 2005 (aged 20)	(Bulgarian Football Union) Montana
15	MF	Auwal Ibrahim	26 January 2006 (aged 19)	Free agent
16	GK	Abubakar Rufai	5 January 2008 (aged 17)	(Nigeria Football Federation) Mavlon
17	MF	Tahir Maigana	30 June 2006 (aged 19)	(Nigeria Football Federation) Wireless
18	FW	Abdullahi Ele	10 October 2007 (aged 17)	(Nigeria Football Federation) JMD Sports Academy
19	MF	Charles Agada	3 September 2006 (aged 19)	(Croatian Football Federation) Istra 1961
20	DF	Haruna Aliyu	2 January 2006 (aged 19)	(Nigeria Football Federation) Wikki Tourists
21	GK	Clinton Andy	30 November 2005 (aged 19)	(Nigeria Football Federation) Bayelsa United

=== Norway ===
The final 21-player squad was announced on 9 September 2025.

Head coach: Bjørn Johansen

No.	Pos.	Player	Date of birth (age)	Club
1	GK	Sander Østraat	2 February 2005 (aged 20)	(Norwegian Football Federation) HamKam
2	DF	Luca Høyland	26 June 2006 (aged 19)	(Norwegian Football Federation) Skeid
3	DF	Vetle Auklend	22 March 2005 (aged 20)	(Norwegian Football Federation) Viking
4	DF	Rasmus Holten	20 February 2005 (aged 20)	(Norwegian Football Federation) Sogndal
5	DF	Håkon Røsten	21 February 2005 (aged 20)	(Norwegian Football Federation) Ranheim
6	MF	Kasper Sætherbø	21 January 2005 (aged 20)	(Norwegian Football Federation) Mjøndalen
7	MF	Markus Haaland	8 March 2005 (aged 20)	(Norwegian Football Federation) Brann
8	FW	Gustav Nyheim	13 February 2006 (aged 19)	(Norwegian Football Federation) Molde
9	FW	Julian Lægreid	8 March 2007 (aged 18)	(Norwegian Football Federation) Brann
10	MF	Sondre Granaas	30 August 2006 (aged 19)	(Norwegian Football Federation) Molde
11	FW	Bork Bang-Kittilsen	22 March 2005 (aged 20)	(Swedish Football Association) Mjällby
12	GK	Magnus Brøndbo	2 March 2005 (aged 20)	(Norwegian Football Federation) Bodø/Glimt
13	DF	Mathias Øren	21 April 2006 (aged 19)	(Norwegian Football Federation) Åsane
14	DF	Jonathan Norbye	26 March 2007 (aged 18)	(German Football Association) Arminia Bielefeld
15	MF	Ola Visted	30 March 2005 (aged 20)	(Norwegian Football Federation) Hødd
16	MF	Martin Håheim-Elveseter	29 December 2005 (aged 19)	(Norwegian Football Federation) Egersund
17	MF	Niklas Fuglestad	20 May 2006 (aged 19)	(Norwegian Football Federation) Moss
18	MF	Tobias Moi	3 March 2006 (aged 19)	(Norwegian Football Federation) Åsane
19	MF	Lars Remmem	18 February 2006 (aged 19)	(Norwegian Football Federation) Brann
20	FW	Magnus Holte	27 March 2006 (aged 19)	(Norwegian Football Federation) Hødd
21	GK	Einar Fauskanger	18 July 2008 (aged 17)	(Norwegian Football Federation) Haugesund

=== Saudi Arabia ===
Head coach: (Brazil) Marcos Soares

No.	Pos.	Player	Date of birth (age)	Club
1	GK	Hamed Al-Shanqiti	26 April 2005 (aged 20)	(Saudi Arabian Football Federation) Al-Ittihad
2	DF	Saud Al-Tumbukti	28 January 2005 (aged 20)	(Saudi Arabian Football Federation) Al-Riyadh
3	DF	Abdullah Al-Sahli	17 February 2005 (aged 20)	(Saudi Arabian Football Federation) Al-Batin
4	DF	Saud Harun	19 July 2005 (aged 20)	(Saudi Arabian Football Federation) Al-Hilal
5	DF	Mohammed Barnawi	7 August 2005 (aged 20)	(Saudi Arabian Football Federation) Al-Ittihad
6	DF	Saleh Barnawi	8 February 2007 (aged 18)	(Saudi Arabian Football Federation) Al-Hilal
7	FW	Amar Al-Yuhaybi	3 March 2006 (aged 19)	(Saudi Arabian Football Federation) Al-Ahli
8	MF	Rakan Al-Ghamdi	6 September 2005 (aged 20)	(Saudi Arabian Football Federation) Al-Nassr
9	FW	**Talal Haji**	16 September 2007 (aged 18)	(Saudi Arabian Football Federation) Al-Riyadh
10	FW	Ziyad Al-Ghamdi	16 February 2005 (aged 20)	(Saudi Arabian Football Federation) Al-Ettifaq
11	FW	Saad Haqawi	8 October 2005 (aged 19)	(Saudi Arabian Football Federation) Al-Nassr
12	DF	Nawaf Al-Ghulaimish	2 May 2005 (aged 20)	(Saudi Arabian Football Federation) Al-Shabab
13	MF	Bassam Hazazi	29 March 2005 (aged 20)	(Saudi Arabian Football Federation) Al-Nassr
14	MF	Farhah Al-Shamrani	27 February 2006 (aged 19)	(Saudi Arabian Football Federation) Al-Riyadh
15	MF	Eyad Housa	21 November 2006 (aged 18)	(Saudi Arabian Football Federation) Al-Qadsiah
16	GK	Mahmoud Al-Burayh	14 February 2006 (aged 19)	(Saudi Arabian Football Federation) Al-Fateh
17	MF	Abdulmalik Al-Marwani	19 June 2005 (aged 20)	(Saudi Arabian Football Federation) Al-Taawoun
18	FW	Ramez Al-Attar	17 January 2006 (aged 19)	(Saudi Arabian Football Federation) Al-Ahli
19	DF	Awad Aman	16 January 2005 (aged 20)	(Saudi Arabian Football Federation) Al-Nassr
20	FW	Thamer Al-Khaibari	3 December 2005 (aged 19)	(Saudi Arabian Football Federation) Neom
21	GK	Abdulrahman Al-Ghamdi	13 February 2006 (aged 19)	(Saudi Arabian Football Federation) Al-Taawoun
