= Mario Sandoval =

Mario Sandoval may refer to:

- Mario Sandoval Alarcón (1923-2003), Guatemalan politician
- Mario Sandoval (police officer) (born 1953), Argentine police officer
- Mario Sandoval (footballer, born 1991), Chilean football midfielder for Deportes Concepción
- Mario Sandoval (footballer, born 2007), Chilean football midfielder for Audax Italiano
