= 2025 FIFA U-20 World Cup final =

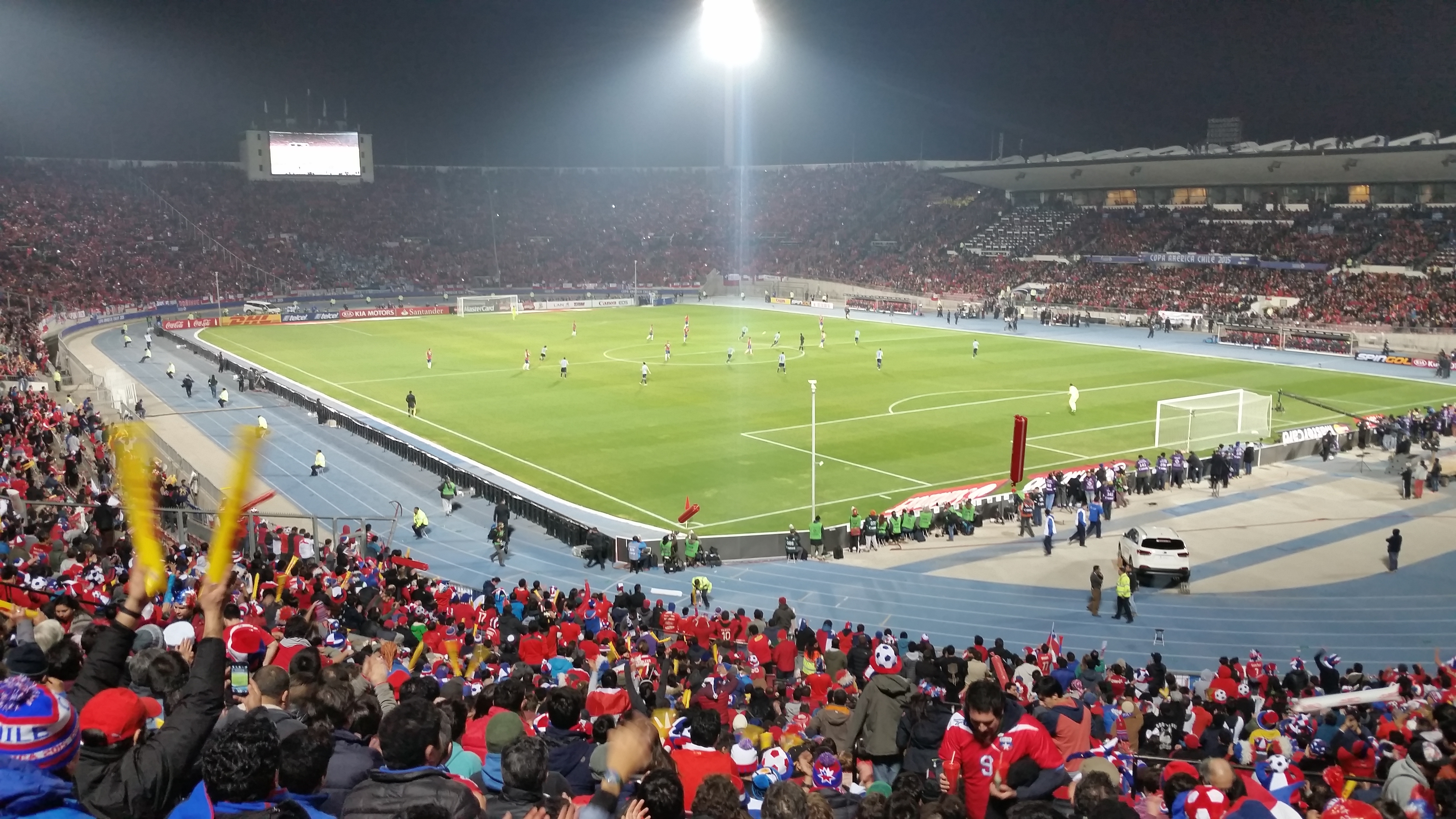
- The Estadio Nacional Julio Martínez Prádanos in Santiago hosted the final.
- Event: 2025 FIFA U-20 World Cup
Argentina	Morocco
(Argentina)	(Morocco)
0	2
- Date: 19 October 2025
- Venue: Estadio Nacional Julio Martínez Prádanos, Santiago
- Man of the Match: Yassir Zabiri (Morocco)
- Referee: Maurizio Mariani (Italy)
- Attendance: 43,253

The 2025 FIFA U-20 World Cup final was the final match and culmination of the 2025 FIFA U-20 World Cup, hosted by Chile. The match was played at the Estadio Nacional Julio Martínez Prádanos in Santiago on 19 October 2025, between Argentina and Morocco, being the eighth final for Argentina and the first for Morocco. In addition, Morocco become the first African country to reach the U-20 World Cup final since Ghana in 2009, in which they won and the first ever Arab nation to do so.

Morocco won the match after defeating Argentina 2–0, winning their first FIFA tournament title.

== Teams ==
Team	Previous finals appearances (bold indicates winners)
Argentina	7 (**1979**, 1983, **1995**, **1997**, **2001**, **2005**, **2007**)
Morocco	None

== Road to the final ==
Argentina
Round
Morocco
Opponent
Result
Group stage
Opponent
Result
Cuba
3–1
Match 1
Spain
2–0
Australia
4–1
Match 2
Brazil
2–1
Italy
1–0
Match 3
Mexico
0–1
**Group D winners**

Pos	Team	Pld	Pts
1	Argentina	3	**9**
2	Italy	3	**4**
3	Australia	3	**3**
4	Cuba	3	**1**

Source: FIFA
Final standings
**Group C winners**

Pos	Team	Pld	Pts
1	Morocco	3	**6**
2	Mexico	3	**5**
3	Spain	3	**4**
4	Brazil	3	**1**

Source: FIFA
Opponent
Result
Knockout stage
Opponent
Result
Nigeria
4–0
Round of 16
South Korea
2–1
Mexico
2–0
Quarter-finals
United States
3–1
Colombia
1–0
Semi-finals
France
1–1 (a.e.t.) (5–4 p)

== Match ==
=== Details ===
19 October 2025
20:00

Argentina	0–2	Morocco
	Report	Zabiri 12', 29'

Estadio Nacional Julio Martínez Prádanos, Santiago
Attendance: 43,253
Referee: Maurizio Mariani (Italy)

**Argentina**	**Morocco**

GK	1	Santino Barbi	(yellow card) 11'
CB	2	Tobías Ramírez
CB	15	Tomás Pérez		(substituted off) 46'
CB	6	Juan Villalba		(substituted off) 46'
RM	4	Dylan Gorosito		(substituted off) 82'
CM	8	Valentino Acuña		(substituted off) 33'
CM	5	Milton Delgado	(yellow card) 81'
LM	3	Julio Soler (c)
RF	7	Maher Carrizo	(yellow card) 75'
CF	9	Alejo Sarco		(substituted off) 60'
LF	20	Gianluca Prestianni	(yellow card) 33'
Substitutions:
MF	17	Mateo Silvetti		(substituted on) 33'
DF	14	Santiago Fernández		(substituted on) 46'
MF	18	Tobías Andrada		(substituted on) 46'
MF	11	Ian Subiabre	(yellow card) 74'	(substituted on) 60'
DF	16	Teo Rodríguez Pagano		(substituted on) 82'
Coach:
Diego Placente

GK	12	Ibrahim Gomis
RB	3	Ali Maamar
CB	4	Ismaël Baouf
CB	19	Smail Bakhty
LB	15	Fouad Zahouani
CM	18	Yassine Khalifi		(substituted off) 62'
CM	6	Naïm Byar
RW	7	Othmane Maamma	(yellow card) 71'	(substituted off) 74'
AM	8	Houssam Essadak (c)	(yellow card) 90+5'
LW	17	Gessime Yassine		(substituted off) 86'
CF	21	Yassir Zabiri		(substituted off) 86'
Substitutions:
FW	10	Saad El Haddad		(substituted on) 62'
FW	11	Ilias Boumassaoudi		(substituted on) 74'
FW	9	Younes El Bahraoui		(substituted on) 86'
FW	13	Taha Majni		(substituted on) 86'
Coach:
Mohamed Ouahbi

Assistant referees:
Daniele Bindoni (Italy)
Alberto Tegoni (Italy)
Fourth official:
Joe Dickerson (United States)
Reserve assistant referee:
Logan Brown (United States)

**Match rules**

- 90 minutes
- 30 minutes of extra time if necessary
- Penalty shoot-out if scores still level
- Maximum of twelve named substitutes
- Maximum of five substitutions, with a sixth allowed in extra time
- Maximum of three substitution opportunities, with a fourth allowed in extra time
- Maximum of one concussion substitution, granting the opposition an additional standalone substitution
