= László Pákozdi =

Hungarian footballer and manager (1916–1993)

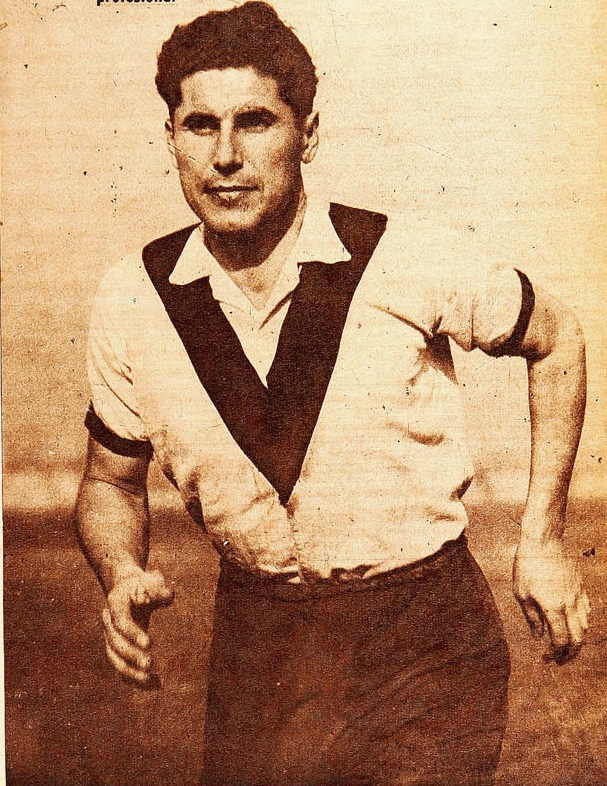

Personal information
- Full name: László Pákozdi Gröschl
- Date of birth: 30 June 1916
- Place of birth: Austria-Hungary
- Date of death: 23 March 1993 (aged 76)
- Place of death: Santiago, Chile
- Position: Defender

Senior career*
Years	Team	Apps	(Gls)
1936–1941	Elektromos TE		
1941–1943	Salgótarjáni SE		
1943–1944	Elektromos TE		
1947	Botafogo		
1947–1948	Santiago Morning		
1948	Universidad Católica		

International career
1939–1940	Hungary	9	(0)

Managerial career
- 1951–1952: Audax Italiano
- 1953–1955: Rangers
- 1956–1957: Audax Italiano
- 1957: Chile
- 1959: San Luis
- 1961–1962: O'Higgins
- 1963: Palestino
- 1964: Audax Italiano
- 1966: Atlético Grau
- 1967: Alianza Lima
- 1968: Unión La Calera
- * Club domestic league appearances and goals

László Pákozdi Gröschl (30 June 1916 – 23 March 1993), known in Spanish as Ladislao Pakozdi, was a Hungarian naturalized Chilean football player and manager.

== Club career ==
From 1936 to 1944, Pákozdi played for both Elektromos TE and Salgótarjáni SE in Hungary. After the World War II, he emigrated to Latin America and joined Botafogo in Brazil in 1947. Next he moved to Chile and played for Santiago Morning and Universidad Católica.

== International career ==
From 1939 to 1940, he made nine appearances for the Hungary national team.

== Managerial career ==
=== In Chile ===
He managed several clubs in the Chilean football. He began his managerial career in Audax Italiano, with whom he won the 1957 Primera División de Chile, the fourth title for the club. As a curiosity, in his playing career Pákozdi was characterized by having a strong shot, and as manager he used to take part in the training sessions. So, in an occasion, he injured the hand of the substitute goalkeeper, Donoso.

In addition, he managed Rangers de Talca, San Luis de Quillota, O'Higgins, Palestino and Unión La Calera.

=== In Peru ===
From 1966 to 1967 he managed both Atlético Grau and Alianza Lima in Peru, becoming the first European football manager in the Peruvian Primera División.

=== Chile national team ===
In 1957, Pákozdi managed Chile in six matches: two matches of the 1957 Copa Bernardo O'Higgins and four matches of the 1958 FIFA World Cup qualification.

Managed international matches
Date	Place	Opponent	Result	Competition
September 15	Santiago, Chile	Brazil	1–0	1957 Copa Bernardo O'Higgins
September 18	Santiago, Chile	Brazil	1–1	1957 Copa Bernardo O'Higgins
September 22	Santiago, Chile	Bolivia	2–1	1958 FIFA World Cup qualification
September 29	La Paz, Bolivia	Bolivia	0–3	1958 FIFA World Cup qualification
October 13	Santiago, Chile	Argentina	0–2	1958 FIFA World Cup qualification
October 20	Buenos Aires, Argentina	Argentina	0–4	1958 FIFA World Cup qualification

== Personal life ==
His original surname was Pfandler and was nicknamed Pupu. He made his home in Chile and acquired the Chilean nationality.

He is the father of the Chilean former tennis player Mario Pakozdi.

== Honours ==
=== Manager ===
Audax Italiano

- Primera División: 1957

Chile

- Copa Bernardo O'Higgins: 1957
