= Cristóbal Muñoz =

Cristóbal Muñoz may refer to:

- Cristóbal Muñoz (footballer, born 2005), Spanish football forward
- Cristóbal Muñoz (footballer, born 1999), Chilean football centre-back
