= Óscar Meneses =

Chilean football manager (born 1960)

Personal information
- Full name: Óscar Alberto Meneses Roa
- Date of birth: 7 March 1960 (age 66)
- Place of birth: Santiago, Chile
- Height: 1.72 m (5 ft 8 in)
- Position: Midfielder

Senior career*
Years	Team	Apps	(Gls)
1979–1982	Universidad Católica	121	(14)
1982–1983	Naval	64	(8)
1984	Trasandino	31	(4)
1985	Real Oviedo	6	(0)
1986	Unión San Felipe	23	(2)
1987	Provincial Osorno	28	(6)
1988	Rangers	21	(1)
1989	La Louvière	12	(1)

Managerial career
- 1990–1992: Universidad Católica (youth)
- 1993–1994: Audax Italiano
- 1999: Unión Española (assistant)
- 2003: Universidad Católica
- 2004: Universidad de Concepción
- 2005: Audax Italiano
- 2006: O'Higgins
- 2018: Veracruz (assistant)
- * Club domestic league appearances and goals

Óscar Alberto Meneses Roa (born 7 March 1960) is a Chilean football manager and former player.
