= Roberto Hernández (Chilean footballer) =

Chilean football manager and player

Personal information
- Full name: Roberto Alfonso Hernández Notario
- Date of birth: 8 April 1964 (age 62)
- Place of birth: Santiago, Chile
- Height: 1.73 m (5 ft 8 in)
- Position: Centre-back

Youth career
- Casa El Valle
- 1965–1969: Magallanes

Senior career*
Years	Team	Apps	(Gls)
1970–1972	Magallanes	42	(2)
1973	O'Higgins	34	(0)
1974–1977	Universidad Católica		
1978	Regional Antofagasta		
1979	Universidad Católica	3	(0)
1979	Trasandino		
1980	Ñublense		
1981	Santiago Wanderers		
1981	Ñublense		
1982	Ciclón de Tarija		

Managerial career
- 1987–1992: Municipal Las Condes
- 1993: Deportes La Serena
- 1994–1995: O'Higgins
- 1996: Audax Italiano
- 1997–1999: Universidad de Chile
- 2001: Colo-Colo
- 2002–2003: Unión Española
- 2003–2005: Audax Italiano
- 2009–2010: O'Higgins
- * Club domestic league appearances and goals

Roberto Alfonso Hernández Notario (born 8 April 1964) is a Chilean former football manager and footballer.

== Playing career ==
As a youth player, Hernández was with Casa El Valle and Magallanes in his city of birth. He joined the Magallanes youth ranks in 1965.

At senior level, he made his debut with Magallanes and played for several clubs in his homeland such as O'Higgins, Universidad Católica, Regional Antofagasta, among others.

His last club was Ciclón de Tarija in Bolivia.

== Managerial career ==
As a football coach, he began his career with Municipal Las Condes, winning the Cuarta División in 1987. At professional level, he first coached Deportes La Serena in 1993.

After leading O'Higgins and Audax Italiano, he became the manager of Universidad de Chile and Colo-Colo.

After coaching O'Higgins in 2010, he was Chile national team youth series’ director of football.

== Personal life ==
He is better known by his nickname Guagua Hernández (Baby).

== Honours ==
=== Player ===
Universidad Católica

- Segunda División de Chile: 1975

=== Manager ===
Municipal Las Condes

- Cuarta División de Chile: 1987

Universidad de Chile

- Copa Apertura: 1998
