= Felipe Salomoni =

Argentine footballer

Personal information
- Full name: Felipe Salomoni
- Date of birth: 28 March 2003 (age 23)
- Place of birth: Vicente López, Buenos Aires, Argentina
- Height: 1.79 m (5 ft 10 1/2 in)
- Position: Left wing-back

Team information
- Current team: Audax Italiano (on loan from Guaraní)

Youth career
- Defensores de Olivos
- 2014–2021: River Plate

Senior career*
Years	Team	Apps	(Gls)
2021–2023	River Plate	1	(0)
2023–	Guaraní	36	(0)
2024–2025	→ Al-Ain (loan)	14	(0)
2025–2026	→ Universidad de Chile (loan)	21	(1)
2026–	→ Audax Italiano (loan)	0	(0)
- * Club domestic league appearances and goals as of 21 June 2026

Felipe Salomoni (born 28 March 2003) is an Argentine professional footballer who plays as a left wing-back for Chilean club Audax Italiano on loan from Paraguayan club Guaraní.

== Career ==
Born in Vicente López, Buenos Aires, Salomoni was with Defensores de Olivos before joining the River Plate youth system in 2014. He made his professional debut under Marcelo Gallardo in the Argentine Primera División against Sarmiento de Junín on 30 August 2021. After suffering a Paget–Schroetter disease in September 2022, he returned to the reserve team in March 2023.

In July 2023, Salomoni left River Plate, moved to Paraguay and signed with Guaraní. In September 2024, he was loaned out to Emirati club Al-Ain. On 3 July 2025, he joined on loan to Universidad de Chile. He switched to Audax Italiano in August 2026.

== Personal life ==
He is the younger brother of the football defender Juan Pablo Salomoni.
