= Gino Iacoponi =

Italian naturalized Chilean footballer

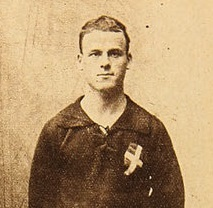

Personal information
- Full name: Gino Iacoponi
- Date of birth: 28 December 1899
- Place of birth: Livorno, Italy
- Place of death: Santiago, Chile
- Position: Forward

Senior career*
| Years | Team | Apps | (Gls) |
| 1919–1923 | Livorno | | |
| 1923–1933 | Audax Italiano | | |

International career
| 1924 | Chile | 1 | (0) |
- * Club domestic league appearances and goals

Gino Iacoponi (28 December 1899 – unknown) was an Italian naturalized Chilean footballer who played as a forward.

== Club career ==
A football forward, Iacoponi joined Livorno in 1919, alongside his older brother, Bruno, and the Chilean Félix Corte. They reached the national final against Inter Milan of the 1919–20 Prima Categoria, losing by 3–2. In 1922, they also won both the Central and South of Italy championships.

In September 1923, the Iacoponi brothers moved to Chile thanks to Félix Corte and joined Audax Italiano, then the team captain, winning the 1924 Primera División of the Liga Metropolitana.

A historical player of Audax Italiano, Gino took part in the 1933 Primera División de Chile, the first season of the Chilean professional football, being a starting player and scoring the second goal in the first match against Morning Star, a 3–1 win.

== International career ==
Iacoponi represented the Chile national team in a friendly match against Uruguay, a 0–1 loss, on 12 October 1924.

== Personal life ==
Born in Livorno, Italy, Gino moved to Chile alongside his older brother, Bruno, thanks to his Chilean friend Félix Corte. They made their home in Santiago and had a convenience store, a bar and a bus fleet, according to his great niece, Bianca Iacoponi, granddaughter of Bruno.

In Chile, his surname was frequently and wrongly written Yacopponi, Jacoponi or Giacoponi. He was nicknamed Giaco.
