= Juan Pablo Salomoni =

Argentine footballer

Personal information
- Full name: Juan Pablo Salomoni
- Date of birth: 7 October 1997 (age 29)
- Place of birth: Buenos Aires, Argentina
- Height: 1.88 m (6 ft 2 in)
- Position: Centre-back

Team information
- Current team: Unión La Calera

Youth career
- Estudiantes BA

Senior career*
Years	Team	Apps	(Gls)
2018–2019	Estudiantes BA	0	(0)
2021–2022	Deportivo Armenio	30	(1)
2023	Guillermo Brown	10	(1)
2024–2026	Beroe	80	(1)
2026–	Unión La Calera	0	(0)
- * Club domestic league appearances and goals as of 21 June 2026

Juan Pablo Salomoni (born 7 October 1997) is an Argentine professional footballer who plays as a centre-back for Liga de Primera club Unión La Calera.

== Career ==
Born in Buenos Aires, Argentina, Salomoni started his career with Estudiantes de Buenos Aires,

In July 2021, Salomoni signed with Deportivo Armenio. He switched to Guillermo Brown in January 2023.

In 2024, Salomoni moved to Europe and signed with Bulgarian club Beroe, becoming the team captain.

In July 2026, Salomoni returned to South America and joined Unión La Calera in the Chilean Primera División.

== Personal life ==
He is the older brother of the football left wing-back Felipe Salomoni.
