= Marcelo Zunino =

Chilean footballer (born 1967)

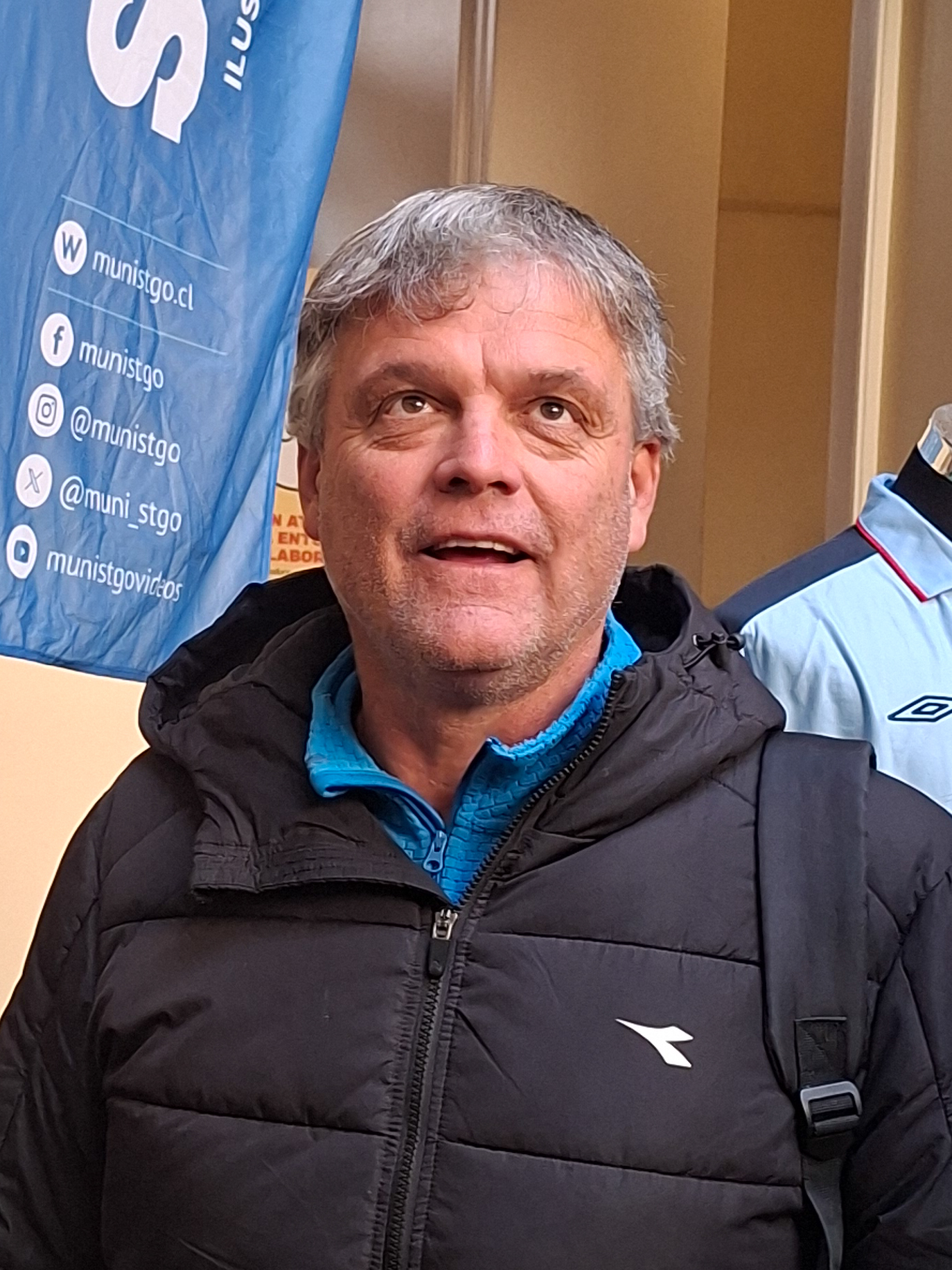
- Zunino in 2026.

Personal information
- Full name: Marcelo Antonio Zunino Poblete
- Date of birth: 30 January 1967 (age 59)
- Place of birth: Santiago, Chile
- Position: Centre-back

Youth career
- Audax Italiano

Senior career*
Years	Team	Apps	(Gls)
1986–1990	Audax Italiano	174	(11)
1991–1992	Unión Española	35	(0)
1993	Deportes Concepción	12	(0)
1994	Deportes Antofagasta	8	(0)
1995	Coquimbo Unido	21	(4)
1996	Provincial Osorno	23	(0)
1997–2001	Audax Italiano	135	(1)

Managerial career
- 2017–2017: Deportes Melipilla (assistant)
- * Club domestic league appearances and goals

Marcelo Antonio Zunino Poblete (born 30 January 1967) is a Chilean former football player who played as a centre-back. He is a historical player for Audax Italiano.

== Club career ==
A product of Audax Italiano, Zunino started his career in the 1986 Primera División de Chile. He spent four seasons with them in the Segunda División de Chile from 1987 to 1990.

The next years, Zunino played for Unión Española, Deportes Concepción, Deportes Antofagasta, Coquimbo Unido and Provincial Osorno, all of them in the Chilean top Division.

Zunino returned to Audax Italiano in 1997 until his retirement in 2001.

== Managerial career ==
Zunino served as assistant coach of Deportes Melipilla in 2016 and 2017.

In February 2026, Zunino assumed as sport manager of Tricolor Municipal de Paine.

== Political career ==
Zunino served as councillor for La Florida commune from 2004 to 2016.

Zunino was elected a member of the Regional Council of Santiago Metropolitan Region for the Santiago V Division in the 2021 Chilean general election as a member of National Renewal. He was reelected in the 2024 Chilean regional elections.

In February 2025, Zunino was charged with tax evasion during his stint as a civil servant for Municipality of La Florida from February to November 2021.

== Television career ==
Zunino has participed as a commentator about Audax Italiano in the program Show de Goles (Show of Goals) from TNT Sports Chile.

In 2014, Zunino competed in the reality show Generaciones Cruzadas (Crossways Generations) from Canal 13 alongside his daughter, Michelle.

In September 2020, Zunino participed in the reality series La Divina Comida (The Divine Dinner) from Chilevisión.

== Personal life ==
Zunino is of Italian descent.

Marcelo is the cousin of the Chilean journalist Carla Zunino.
