= Bruno Iacoponi =

Italian footballer

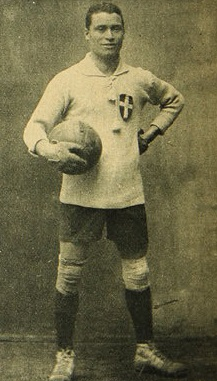

Personal information
- Full name: Bruno Iacoponi
- Date of birth: 23 July 1895
- Place of birth: Livorno, Italy
- Place of death: Santiago, Chile
- Position: Goalkeeper

Senior career*
Years	Team	Apps	(Gls)
1919–1923	Livorno		
1923–1930	Audax Italiano		

Managerial career
- 1946: Audax Italiano
- * Club domestic league appearances and goals

Bruno Iacoponi (23 July 1895 – unknown) was an Italian footballer who played as a Goalkeeper.

== Club career ==
A football goalkeeper, Iacoponi joined Livorno in 1919, alongside his younger brother, Gino, and the Chilean Félix Corte. They reached the national final against Inter Milan of the 1919–20 Prima Categoria, losing by 3–2. In 1922, they also won both the Central and South of Italy championships.

In September 1923, the Iacoponi brothers moved to Chile thanks to Félix Corte and joined Audax Italiano, then the team captain, winning the 1924 Primera División of the Liga Metropolitana. In the same year, they also faced Uruguay on 26 October representing a squad made up by players from the Liga Metropolitana.

A historical player of Audax Italiano, Bruno played for them until his retirement in 1930.

== Managerial career ==
Iacoponi led Audax Italiano in two matches in the 1946 Chilean Primera División.

== Personal life ==
Born in Livorno, Italy, Bruno moved to Chile alongside his younger brother, Gino, thanks to his Chilean friend Félix Corte. They made their home in Santiago and had a convenience store, a bar and a bus fleet, according to his granddaughter, Bianca Iacoponi.

In Chile, his surname was frequently and wrongly written Yacopponi, Jacoponi or Giacoponi. The Iacoponi brothers were nicknamed Giaco.

== Honours ==
=== Manager ===
Audax Italiano

- Chilean Primera División: 1946
