= Nicolás Aedo =

Chilean footballer

Personal information
- Full name: Nicolás Alejandro Aedo Muñoz
- Date of birth: 6 April 2001 (age 25)
- Place of birth: Puente Alto, Santiago, Chile
- Height: 1.68 m (5 ft 6 in)
- Position: Attacking midfielder

Team information
- Current team: Audax Italiano
- Number: 18

Youth career
- Audax Italiano

Senior career*
Years	Team	Apps	(Gls)
2020–	Audax Italiano	25	(0)
2023	→ Unión La Calera (loan)	8	(0)

International career
2014	Chile U15		
- * Club domestic league appearances and goals as of 25 September 2025

Nicolás Alejandro Aedo Muñoz (born 6 April 2001) is a Chile footballer who plays as an attacking midfielder for Chilean Primera División side Audax Italiano.

== Club career ==
Born in Puente Alto commune, Santiago de Chile, Aedo is a product of the Audax Italiano youth system. A first team member since 2020, he made his senior debut in the 2–1 away loss against Deportes Iquique for the Chilean Primera División on 10 October of the same year. During the 2023 Chilean Primera División, he played on loan for Unión La Calera.

== International career ==
Aedo represented Chile at under-15 level during 2014.

In November 2020, Aedo was called up to a training microcycle of the under 20's with views to the 2021 South American Championship.
