= Félix Corte =

Chilean footballer (1898–1982)

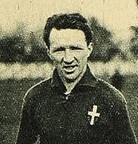

Personal information
- Full name: Félix Bautista Corte Bórquez
- Date of birth: 4 August 1898
- Place of birth: Valdivia, Chile
- Date of death: 21 April 1982 (aged 83)
- Place of death: Santiago, Chile
- Position: Forward

Youth career
- Internado Nacional

College career
Years	Team	Apps	(Gls)
1921–1922	University of Chile		

Senior career*
Years	Team	Apps	(Gls)
1914–1916	Internado FC		
1919–1920	Livorno	15	(?)
1921–1922	Internado FC		
1923–1925	Audax Italiano		
1925–1926	CD Scout		
1927–1928	Audax Italiano		

International career
1924	Chile	1	(0)
- * Club domestic league appearances and goals

Félix Bautista Corte Bórquez (4 August 1898 – 21 April 1982), also known as Giuseppe Corte, Felice Coste or Felice Carte, was a Chilean footballer who played as a forward.

== Club career ==
A football forward, Corte joined Internado FC, the previous club to Universidad de Chile, in 1914, winning both the Copa Excelsior and the Copa Independencia of the Asociación de Football de Santiago (AFS).

After taking part in the World War I from 1917 to 1918 as an Italian officer, he joined Livorno in 1919, becoming the first Chilean to play in the Italian top division. He joined the team alongside the Iacoponi brothers, Bruno, another Italian soldier, and Gino, who later played in Chile.

He made fifteen appearances for Livorno and they reached the national final against Inter Milan of the 1919–20 Prima Categoria, losing by 3–2.

Back in Chile, he rejoined Internado FC in 1921, winning the Copa Chile of the AFS. As a student of University of Chile, he also represented them in the Clásico Universitario against Pontifical Catholic University of Chile in 1921 and 1922.

In 1923, Corte joined Audax Italiano, becoming the team captain and called up the Iacoponi brothers, Bruno and Gino, both fellows in Livorno, winning the 1924 Primera División of the Liga Metropolitana.

After a stint with CD Scout from Punta Arenas from 1925 to 1926, he ended his career with Audax Italiano in 1927–28.

== International career ==
Corte represented the Chile national team in a friendly match against Uruguay, a 0–1 loss, on 12 October 1924. As a member of the Liga Metropolitana squad, he faced them again on 26 October, a 1–3 loss.

== Fencing ==
At the same he was a footballer, he developed a career in fencing alongside his brother Pablo, who became national champion many times.

== Personal life ==
Corte was born in Valdivia, Chile, to an Italian father, Felice Corte Da Forno, and a Chilean mother, Luisa Bórquez Patiño. His father came first to Argentina in 1889 from Pieve di Cadore, Veneto region. Subsequently, he moved to Los Andes and Valdivia in Chile.

He had seven siblings.

As a student, he attended the Internado Nacional Barros Arana, where he stood out in football, fencing and track and field.

Corte joined the Italian army in the World War I at the age of seventeen, after his father forged his identification due to his age, being known as Giuseppe Corte, Felice Coste or Felice Carte. In the war, he met Bruno Iacoponi, with whom he coincided in Livorno and Audax Italiano.

== Legacy ==
Corte was a founder member of Club Universitario de Deportes from Santiago in 1928, becoming the representative of the fencing area.

Some years, the Chilean Primera División cup was named "Trofeo Félix Corte" (Félix Corte Trophy).
