= Sebastián Mella =

Chilean footballer

Personal information
- Full name: Sebastián Ignacio Mella Almendra
- Date of birth: 31 July 2005 (age 21)
- Place of birth: Chiguayante, Chile
- Height: 1.85 m (6 ft 1 in)
- Position: Goalkeeper

Team information
- Current team: Huachipato
- Number: 1

Youth career
- Huachipato

Senior career*
Years	Team	Apps	(Gls)
2024–	Huachipato	9	(0)

International career
2025	Chile U20	5	(0)
- * Club domestic league appearances and goals as of 16 November 2026

Sebastián Ignacio Mella Almendra (born 31 July 2005) is a Chilean professional footballer who plays as a goalkeeper for Huachipato.

== Club career ==
A product of Huachipato, Mella made his professional debut in the 1–2 away victory against Imperial Unido on 4 September 2024 for the Copa Chile. In the Liga de Primera, he made his debut in the 2–1 home victory against Universidad de Chile on 8 February 2026 and later became the starting goalkeeper.

== International career ==
In 2025, Mella represented Chile at under-20 level in friendlies and the FIFA World Cup.

Mella received his first call-up to the Chile senior team for the 2026 FIFA Series matches against Cape Verde and New Zealand in March 2026.

== Honours ==
Huachipato

- Copa Chile: 2025
