= Gabriel Maureira =

Chilean footballer

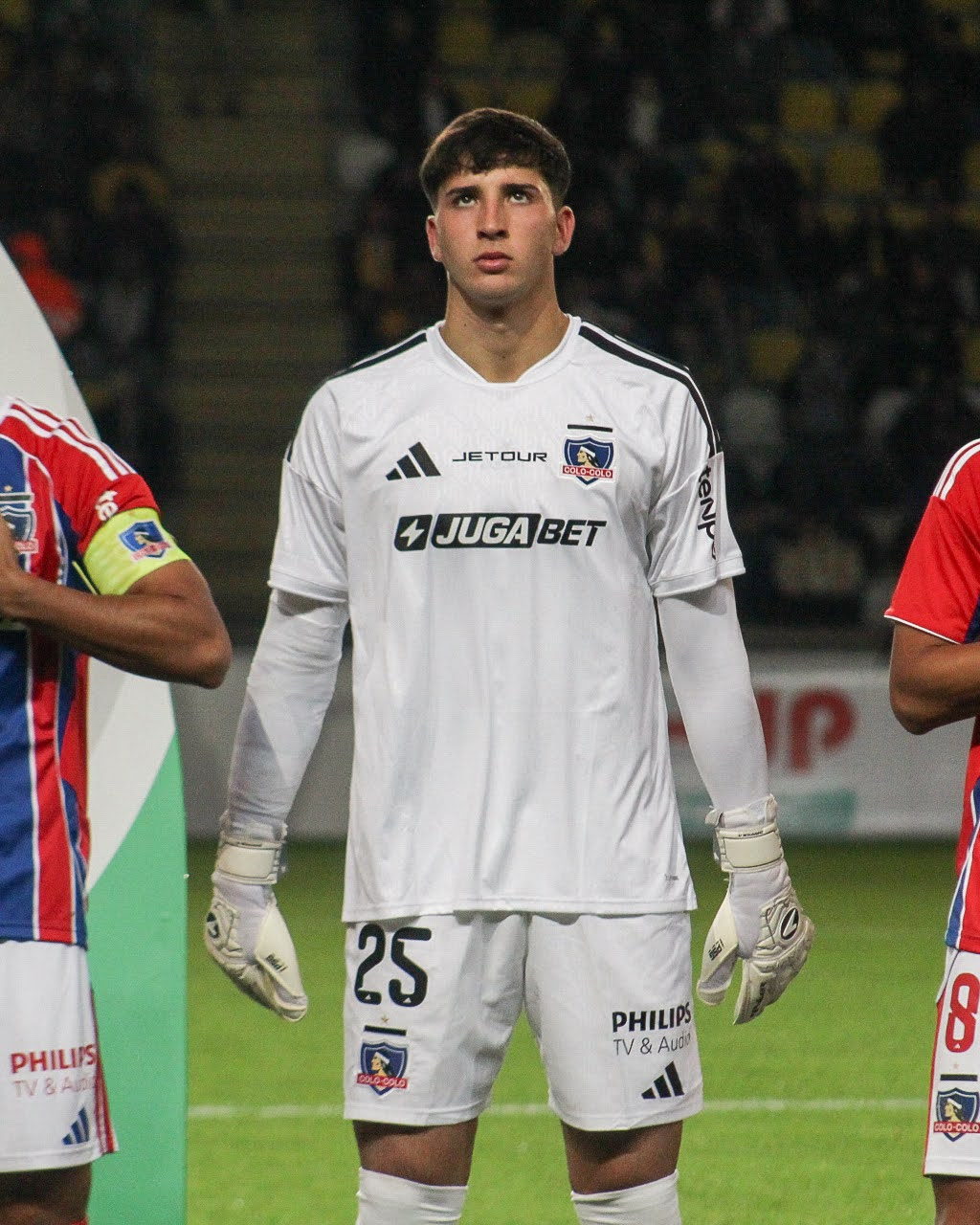
- Maureira with Colo-Colo in 2026

Personal information
- Date of birth: 6 February 2007 (age 19)
- Place of birth: Independencia, Santiago, Chile
- Height: 1.93 m (6 ft 4 in)
- Position: Goalkeeper

Team information
- Current team: Colo-Colo
- Number: 25

Youth career
- 2022–2025: Colo-Colo

Senior career*
Years	Team	Apps	(Gls)
2025–	Colo-Colo	8	(0)

International career^{‡}
2025–	Chile U20	4	(0)
- * Club domestic league appearances and goals as of 2 June 2026 ‡ National team caps and goals as of 12 June 2026

Gabriel Alonso Maureira Morales (born 6 February 2007) is a Chilean football goalkeeper who currently plays for Colo-Colo.

== Club career ==
Born in Independencia commune, Santiago de Chile, Maureira joined Colo-Colo's youth system following a mass goalkeeper trial held in November 2021. After being a regular starter at every youth level of the club, he made his unofficial debut for the first team on 22 January 2026 in a friendly against Peñarol at the 2026 Río de la Plata Series, saving a penalty during the shootout.

Maureira made his official debut on 19 April 2026 in a league match against Palestino, coming on in the 70th minute to replace the injured Fernando de Paul. Following de Paul's season-ending injury, Maureira retained his place in the starting lineup and became Colo-Colo's first choice goalkeeper.

== International career ==
A member of the Chile national under-20 team since 2025, Maureira was called up to the squad for the friendly match against Brazil on 6 June 2026.

Maureira was called up to the Chile under-20 squad for the 2026 South American Games, but he was replaced by José Alburquenque due to an injury.
