= Cristóbal Muñoz (footballer, born 1999) =

Chilean footballer

Personal information
- Full name: Cristóbal Felipe Muñoz Vásquez
- Date of birth: 11 October 1999 (age 27)
- Place of birth: Santiago, Chile
- Height: 1.83 m (6 ft 0 in)
- Position: Centre-back

Team information
- Current team: Audax Italiano
- Number: 3

Youth career
- 2011–2019: Audax Italiano

Senior career*
Years	Team	Apps	(Gls)
2016–	Audax Italiano	34	(0)
2021	→ Colchagua (loan)	11	(2)
- * Club domestic league appearances and goals as of 22 September 2025

Cristóbal Felipe Muñoz Vásquez (born 11 October 1999) is a Chilean footballer who plays as a centre-back for Chilean Primera División side Audax Italiano.

== Club career ==
Born in Santiago de Chile, Muñoz joined the Audax Italiano youth ranks at the age of 11 and was promoted to the first team at the age of 16. After having no chances to play, he was sent on loan to Colchagua in the Segunda División Profesional de Chile during 2021.

Back to Audax Italiano, he made his debut with the first team in the 2–0 away loss against Universidad de Chile for the Chilean Primera División on 3 October 2023 and got regularity the next season. On 17 August 2025, he suffered a right Achilles tendon rupture in the 1–3 away win against Universidad de Chile.
