= Selim Telib =

Egypt international footballer (born 2006)

Personal information
- Date of birth: 14 March 2006 (age 20)
- Place of birth: Berlin, Germany
- Height: 1.84 m (6 ft 0 in)
- Position: Central midfielder

Team information
- Current team: Hertha BSC
- Number: 47

Youth career
- 2012–2017: TeBo Berlin
- 2017–: Hertha BSC

Senior career*
Years	Team	Apps	(Gls)
2023–	Hertha BSC II	25	(2)
2024–	Hertha BSC	1	(0)

International career^{‡}
2022	Egypt U16	1	(0)
2023	Egypt U17	2	(0)
2024–	Egypt U20	1	(0)
- * Club domestic league appearances and goals as of 18 May 2026 ‡ National team caps and goals as of 14 November 2024.

Selim Telib (Arabic: سليم طلب; born 14 March 2006) is a professional footballer who plays as a central midfielder for 2. Bundesliga club Hertha BSC. Born in Germany, he represents Egypt at youth level.

== Career ==
Telib is a youth product of Tennis Borussia Berlin, before moving to the youth academy of Hertha BSC in 2017. He started his senior career with the Hertha reserves in 2022. On 2 August 2023, he signed his first professional contract with Hertha until 2027. He made his professional debut in a 3–1 win against VfL Osnabrück on September 13, 2026.

== International career ==
Selim was born in Berlin to an Egyptian father and a German mother, The Egyptian-origin player had previously joined the junior and youth teams in Germany, but in the end he chose to represent the Pharaohs.
