= Yassir Zabiri =

Moroccan footballer (born 2005)

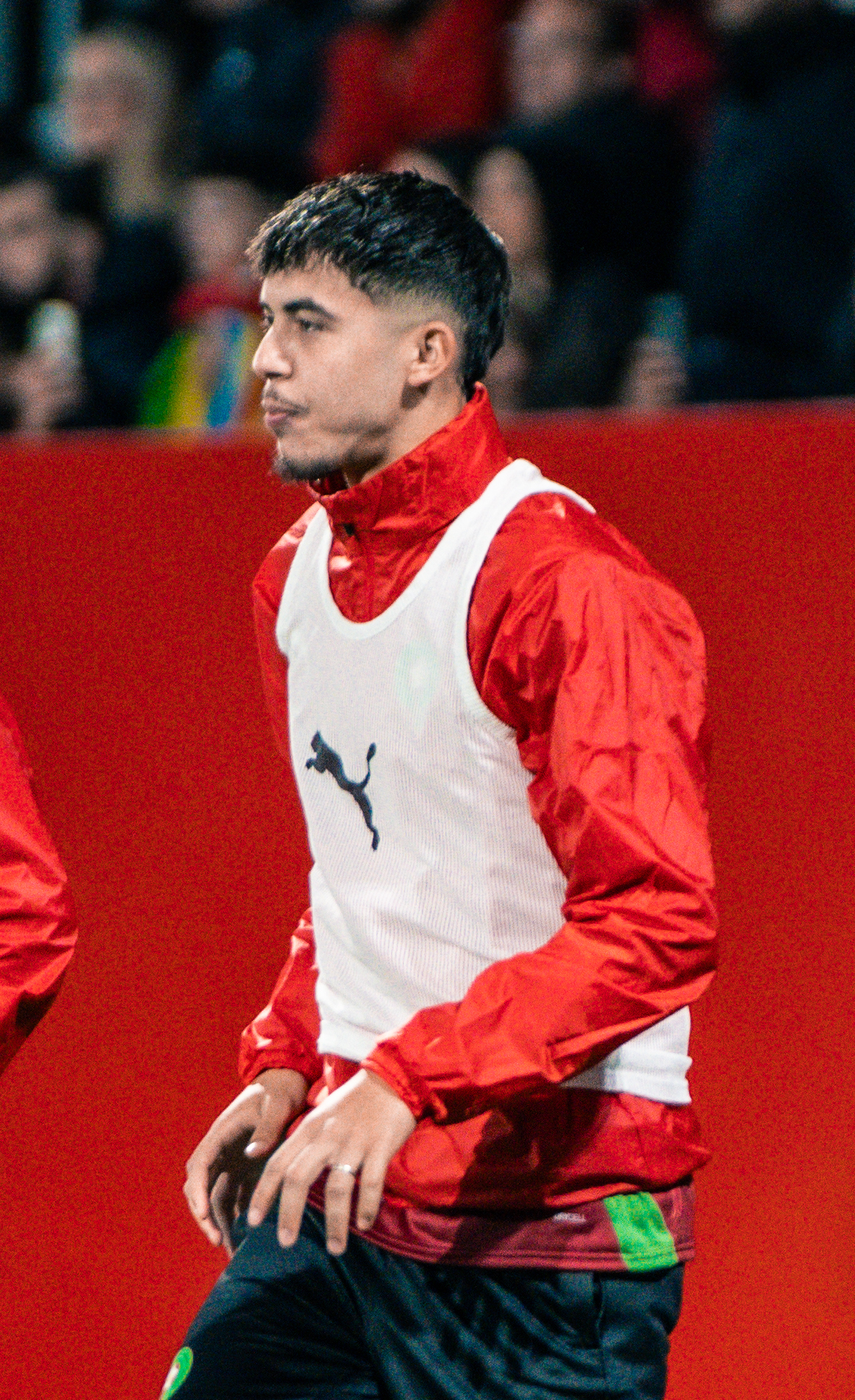
- Zabiri with Morocco in 2026

Personal information
- Full name: Mohamed Yassir Zabiri
- Date of birth: 23 February 2005 (age 21)
- Place of birth: Marrakesh, Morocco
- Height: 1.82 m (6 ft 0 in)
- Position: Forward

Team information
- Current team: Racing Santander (on loan from Rennes)
- Number: 21

Youth career
- 2015–2024: Mohammed VI Football Academy

Senior career*
Years	Team	Apps	(Gls)
2024	Union Touarga	11	(3)
2024–2026	Famalicão	17	(5)
2026–	Rennes	6	(0)
2026–	→ Racing Santander (loan)	13	(11)

International career^{‡}
2023–2025	Morocco U20	30	(19)
2026	Morocco U23	2	(2)
2026–	Morocco	3	(1)
Medal record
Men's football
Representing Morocco
FIFA U-20 World Cup
Winner	2025 Chile
U-20 Africa Cup of Nations
Runner-up	2025 Egypt
- * Club domestic league appearances and goals as of 22 November 2026 ‡ National team caps and goals as of 13 November 2026

Mohamed Yassir Zabiri (Arabic: محمد ياسر الزبيري; born 23 February 2005) is a Moroccan professional footballer who plays as a forward for La Liga club Racing Santander, on loan from Ligue 1 club Rennes, and the Morocco national team.

== Club career ==
A youth product of the Mohammed VI Football Academy, Zabiri began his senior career with Union de Touarga in the Botola in 2024. After a strong debut half-season, on 26 August 2024, he moved to Portugal, joining Primeira Liga club Famalicão on a four-year contract.

On 2 February 2026, Zabiri signed for Rennes in Ligue 1 until June 2029. On 29 July, however, he was loaned to La Liga side Racing Santander for one year. On 28 August 2026, Zabiri scored his first-ever professional career hat-trick against Elche, which ended in a 3–2 win.

== International career ==
Zabiri was part of Morocco U20s that came in second for the 2023 UNAF U-20 Tournament. The following year, be helped the U20s win the 2024 UNAF U-20 Tournament. He scored 12 goals in 21 matches to start with the Morocco U20s from 2023 to 2025.

In the 2025 FIFA U-20 World Cup, Zabiri finished as the joint top scorer with five goals, scoring a brace in a 2–0 victory over Argentina in the final. He was called up to the senior Morocco national team in March 2026. On 25 September 2026, Zabiri made his debut for the national team in a 2–0 win against Gabon. On 13 November 2026, Zabiri scored his first goal for the national team in a 5–1 win against Niger.

== Personal life ==
On 24 January 2026, Zabiri married Farah El Khalifi in a ceremony in Rabat. The pair had been engaged since September 2025.

== Career statistics ==
=== Club ===
As of match played 22 November 2026

Appearances and goals by club, season and competition
Club	Season	League			National cup (Note: Includes Taça de Portugal)		Total	
Club	Season	Division	Apps	Goals	Apps	Goals	Apps	Goals
Union Touarga	2023–24	Botola Pro	11	3	0	0	11	3
Famalicão	2024–25	Primeira Liga	5	1	1	2	6	3
Famalicão	2025–26	Primeira Liga	12	4	2	0	14	4
Famalicão	Total		17	5	3	2	20	7
Stade Rennais	2025–26	Ligue 1	6	0	0	0	6	0
Racing Santander (loan)	2026–27	La Liga	13	11	0	0	13	11
Career total			47	19	3	2	50	21

=== International ===
As of match played 13 November 2026

Appearances and goals by national team and year
National team	Year	Apps	Goals
Morocco	2026	3	1
Total		3	1

Scores and results list Morocco's goal tally first, score column indicates score after each Zabiri goal.

List of international goals scored by Yassir Zabiri
No.	Date	Venue	Opponent	Score	Result	Competition
1	13 November 2026	Stade Mohammed V, Casablanca, Morocco	Niger	1–0	5–1	2027 Africa Cup of Nations qualification

== Honours ==
Morocco U20

- FIFA U-20 World Cup: 2025
- U-20 Africa Cup of Nations runner-up: 2025

Individual

- FIFA U-20 World Cup Silver Ball: 2025
- FIFA U-20 World Cup Top scorer: 2025 (joint)
- La Liga U23 Player of the Month: September 2026
