= Audax Italiano =

Chilean football club

- Full name: Audax Club Sportivo Italiano, SADP
- Nicknames: Los Tanos; Los Itálicos; Audinos
- Founded: November 30, 1910; 115 years ago
- Ground: Estadio Bicentenario de La Florida; La Florida, Chile
- Capacity: 12,000
- Chairman: Gonzalo Cilley
- Manager: Gustavo Lema
- League: Liga de Primera
- 2025: Liga de Primera, 5th of 16
- Website: audaxitaliano.cl
Home colours	Away colours

Audax Club Sportivo Italiano (Spanish pronunciation: [ˈawðaks itaˈljano]) is a professional football club based in La Florida, Santiago, Chile. It was founded on 30 November 1910 by members of the Italian community in Chile as a cycling club named Audax Club Ciclista Italiano. The word Audax comes from Latin and means "bold" or "daring", a term commonly associated with cyclists in the early 20th century.

In 1921, brothers Domingo and Tito Fruttero established the club's football section, which joined the Liga Metropolitana that same year and won the competition in 1924. In 1927, Audax began competing in the Liga Central, renamed the Asociación de Football de Santiago in 1930, winning its top division in 1931 and 1932. Although originally founded as a cycling club and active in several other sports, Audax eventually became exclusively dedicated to football.

In 1933, Audax Italiano was one of the founding members of the Primera División. The club has won four league titles, in 1936, 1946, 1948 and 1957, making it the joint sixth-most successful club in the history of the Chilean top flight, alongside Magallanes and Everton.

Audax Italiano play their home matches at the Estadio Bicentenario de La Florida, which has a capacity of 12,000 spectators. The stadium was inaugurated in 1986 and completely rebuilt in 2008 for the 2008 FIFA U-20 Women's World Cup, hosting both the opening match and the final.

The club's traditional rivals are Unión Española and Palestino, with whom it contests the Clásico de colonias. Audax also historically contested the Clásico Criollo against Colo-Colo, so named because the two clubs were, at the time, the only sides to field exclusively Chilean players.

== History ==
=== Foundation and early success ===
Audax Italiano was founded on 30 November 1910 by members of Santiago's Italian community, led by Alberto Caffi, Ruggero Cozzi and Amato Ruggieri. Originally established as the Audax Club Ciclista Italiano, the organisation was primarily devoted to cycling. As its membership grew, the club expanded into other sports, and a football section was formally established in 1921, prompting the adoption of the name Audax Club Sportivo Italiano.

Audax quickly became a prominent force in Santiago football. It won the Copa Chile in 1922 and later joined the Liga Metropolitana, before entering the Liga Central following the reorganisation of Chilean football. The club won the 1931 championship and shared the final amateur title with Colo-Colo in 1932 after their deciding match was abandoned following the collapse of a stand at the Estadio Italiano.

In 1933, Audax embarked on an extensive tour of the Americas, playing 59 matches across several countries before returning to Chile. That same year, it became one of the founding members of Chile's professional league. After finishing runners-up in 1934 and 1935, Audax won its first Primera División championship in 1936 under player-manager Carlos Giudice.

=== 20th Century ===
Audax remained among Chile's leading clubs during the 1940s and 1950s. It won the Campeonato de Apertura in 1941 and added three further Primera División championships in 1946, 1948 and 1957. The club also came close to additional titles, notably losing the 1951 championship play-off to Unión Española at the Estadio Nacional.

Audax's fortunes declined from the 1960s onwards, despite players such as Carlos Reinoso, the league's leading scorer in 1968. The club was relegated for the first time in 1971 after losing a deciding match against Lota Schwager, returning to the top flight in 1976. Results remained inconsistent during the following decade. Audax reached the 1981 Copa Chile final but was relegated again in 1986 and subsequently spent almost a decade in the second tier. In 1987, the club also began playing its home matches in La Florida, establishing a lasting association with the commune.

Under Jorge Aravena, Audax finally returned to the Primera División in 1995. The club quickly re-established itself in the top flight, finishing fourth in 1996 and third in the 1997 Clausura. It reached the 1998 Copa Chile final, which also earned qualification for the 1998 Copa CONMEBOL, the club's first appearance in an official international competition.

=== Recent era ===
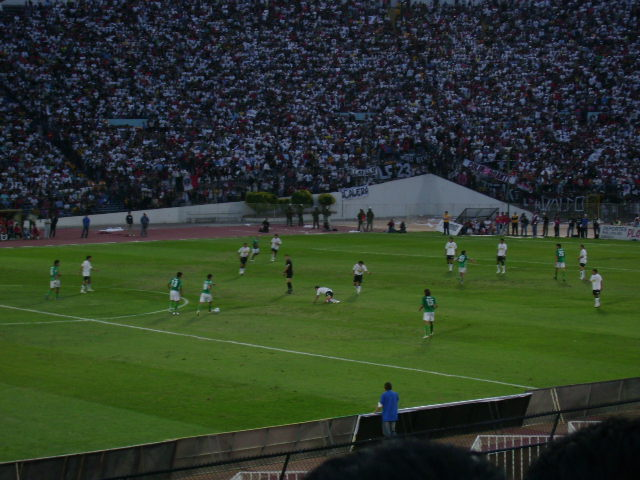
The second leg of the 2006 Clausura final between Audax Italiano and Colo-Colo at the Estadio Nacional.

After several uneven seasons, Audax experienced another period of prominence under manager Raúl Toro. The club reached the final of the 2006 Clausura, losing to Colo-Colo, but the campaign secured its first qualification for the Copa Libertadores.

Audax made its Libertadores debut in 2007, recording notable results against Alianza Lima and São Paulo but narrowly missing the knockout stage on goal difference. Domestically, the club finished third in the 2007 Apertura and topped the regular stage of the Clausura, while also competing in the 2007 Copa Sudamericana. These performances secured another Libertadores appearance in 2008.

In the 2008 Copa Libertadores, Audax advanced through the preliminary round before finishing bottom of a group containing Atlético Nacional, São Paulo and Sportivo Luqueño, although it defeated São Paulo 1–0 in Santiago. That year also saw the reopening of the renovated Estadio Bicentenario de La Florida, strengthening the club's institutional identification with the commune. Audax remained competitive in subsequent seasons, including a 14-match unbeaten run under Omar Labruna in 2010 that took the club to the final of the Pre-Libertadores play-off.

== Rivalries ==
As a club founded by immigrants, it has a special rivalry with the other immigrant clubs Unión Española (founded by Spaniards) and Palestino (founded by Palestinian Arabs).

These games are known as the "Diaspora Derby" (Spanish: Clásico de Colonias).

== Honours ==
Audax has been national champions four times, joint sixth alongside Magallanes. The club also achieved three Copa Chile runner-up finishes in 1981, 1998 and 2018.

The club had their first major success in 1936, when they won the league title. During the 1940s, Audax won two further titles in 1946 and 1948, and a fourth in 1957.

=== National ===
- Primera División de Chile
  - Winners (4): 1936, 1946, 1948, 1957
- Campeonato de Apertura
  - Winners (1): 1941

=== Regional ===
- Primera División (Asociación de Football de Santiago)
  - Winners (3): 1922, 1931, 1932
- Primera División (Liga Metropolitana)
  - Winners (1): 1924
- Copa Chile de la Asociación de Football de Santiago
  - Winners (1): 1922
- Copa Joaquín Prieto Concha
  - Winners (1): 1924
- Campeonato de Apertura de la Liga Metropolitana de Deportes
  - Winners (1): 1925
- Campeonato de Apertura de la Asociación de Football de Santiago
  - Winners (1): 1932
- Sección Argentina de la Copa Chile de la Asociación de Football de Santiago
  - Winners (1): 1922
- Copa Luis A. Poblete
  - Winners (1): 1922

== Performance in CONMEBOL competitions ==
- Copa Libertadores: 3 appearances

2007: Group stage
2008: Group stage
2022: Second stage

- Copa Sudamericana: 4 appearances

2007: Second preliminary round
2018: First round
2020: Second round
2023: Knockout round play-offs

- Copa CONMEBOL: 1 appearance

1998: First round

== Records ==
- Largest margin of victory:

In Primera División matches: 9–2 vs. Universidad Católica in 1945
In Copa Chile matches: 13–0 vs. Juventud Varsovia in 2010
In international matches: 3–1 Alianza Lima in 2007

- Largest margin of defeat:

In Primera División matches: 1–7 vs. Colo-Colo in 1939 & 0–6 vs. Santiago Wanderers in 1993
In international matches: 1–4 vs. Sportivo Luqueño in 2008

- Longest win streak: 24 games in 2007
- Most goals scored in international play: Rodolfo Moya & Carlos Villanueva (3 goals)
- Most goals scored in Primera División: Carlos Tello (101 goals)
- Most goals scored in one season in Primera División: José Luis Díaz (23 goals in 1999)
- Most goals scored in two short tournaments: Carlos Villanueva (30 goals in 2007)

== Players ==
=== Current squad ===
Current squad of Audax Italiano as of 12 September 2026 (edit)
Sources: Audax Official Web Site

No.		Position	Player
1	CHI	GK	Tomás Ahumada
2	CHI	MF	Vicente Zenteno
3	ARG	DF	Felipe Salomoni (loan from Guaraní)
5	CHI	DF	Cristóbal Muñoz
6	CHI	MF	Mario Sandoval
7	CHI	FW	Paolo Guajardo
8	CHI	MF	Marco Collao (c)
9	URU	FW	Diego Coelho
10	ARG	MF	Rodrigo Cabral (loan from Huracán)
11	ARG	FW	Franco Troyansky
12	CHI	GK	Cristóbal Piña
13	USA	DF	Enzo Ferrario
14	CHI	DF	Diego Monreal
15	CHI	DF	Tomás Cayuqueo
16	CHI	MF	Óliver Rojas
17	CHI	MF	Favian Loyola
18	CHI	MF	Nicolás Aedo

No.		Position	Player
19	CHI	MF	César Pinares
20	CHI	DF	Martín Jiménez
21	ARG	FW	Giovani Chiaverano (loan from Newell's Old Boys)
22	CHI	FW	Damián Pizarro (loan from Udinese)
24	CHI	MF	Nicolás Orellana
25	CHI	GK	Pedro Garrido
27	CHI	FW	Michael Vadulli
28	ARG	MF	Federico Mateos
29	ARG	DF	Marcelo Ortiz
30	CHI	MF	Ariel Uribe (loan from Unión Española)
32	CHI	MF	Bryan Soto (loan from Colo-Colo)
34	CHI	FW	Damián Jara
35	CHI	DF	Raimundo Rebolledo
36	CHI	DF	Tomás González
37	CHI	MF	Ítalo Pastén
38	CHI	MF	Tomás Leyton

Manager: Patricio Graff

=== Out on loan ===
Note: Flags indicate national team as defined under FIFA eligibility rules; some limited exceptions apply. Players may hold more than one non-FIFA nationality.

No.	Pos.	Nation	Player
—	GK	CHI	Martín Ballesteros (at Santiago City)
—	MF	CHI	Alessandro Riep (at Independiente Rivadavia)

No.	Pos.	Nation	Player
—	FW	CHI	Ignacio Fuenzalida (at Deportes Copiapó)

=== 2026 Winter Transfers ===
==== In ====
Note: Flags indicate national team as defined under FIFA eligibility rules; some limited exceptions apply. Players may hold more than one non-FIFA nationality.

No.	Pos.	Nation	Player
3	DF	ARG	Felipe Salomoni (loan from Guaraní)
19	MF	CHI	César Pinares (free)
22	FW	CHI	Damián Pizarro (loan from Udinese)

No.	Pos.	Nation	Player
30	FW	CHI	Ariel Uribe (loan from Unión Española)
—	FW	CHI	Andrés Torres (from Universidad de Chile)

==== Out ====
Note: Flags indicate national team as defined under FIFA eligibility rules; some limited exceptions apply. Players may hold more than one non-FIFA nationality.

No.	Pos.	Nation	Player
4	DF	CHI	Daniel Piña (to Juárez)
23	DF	CHI	Esteban Matus (to Olimpia)
31	GK	CHI	Martín Ballesteros (loan to Santiago City)

No.	Pos.	Nation	Player
33	FW	CHI	Ignacio Fuenzalida (loan to Deportes Copiapó)
—	DF	CHI	Matías Orellana (to Cobreloa)

=== Current coaching staff ===
Position	Name
Head coach	(Argentina) Gustavo Lema
Assistant coach	(Argentina) José Maria Bazán
Assistant coach	(Argentina) Matías Lema
Fitness coach	(Argentina) Hernán Petti
Fitness coach	(Chile) Álvaro Galizia
Fitness coach	(Chile) Fabián Venegas
Goalkeeping coach	(Chile) Diego Meneses
Video analyst	(Chile) Darío Quezada
Video analyst	(Chile) Gaspar Camaratta
Kinesiologist	(Chile) Diego Granić
Kinesiologist	(Chile) Mirko Maturana
Nutritionist	(Chile) Florencia Vargas
Kit man	(Chile) Bastian Salinas
Kit man	(Chile) Tomás Tapia
Coordinator	(Chile) Rodrigo Bórquez

== Notable players ==
- (Argentina) Claudio Borghi
- (Argentina) Franco Di Santo
- (Chile) (Italy) Félix Corte
- (Chile) Carlos Villanueva
- (Chile) Marcelo Zunino
- (Italy) Bruno Iacoponi
- (Italy) (Chile) Gino Iacoponi
- (Paraguay) Salvador Cabañas

== Managers ==
Interim coaches appear in italics.

- (Chile) Carlos Giudice (1936–37, 1939)
- (Argentina) Nicolás Lombardo (1939)
- (Chile) Raúl Marchant (1938, 1941–43)
- (Argentina) José Luis Boffi (1944–1945)
- (Chile) Raúl Marchant (1945–46)
- (Italy) Bruno Iacoponi (1946)
- (Argentina) Salvador Nocetti (1947–48)
- (Hungary) Ladislao Pakozdi (1951)
- (Italy) Mario Pretto (1953–54)
- (Argentina) Roberto Scarone (1955)
- (Hungary) Ladislao Pakozdi (1956–57)
- (Chile) Luis Tirado (1959)
- (Chile) Enrique Sorrel (1959–60)
- (Hungary) (Chile) Janos Schwanner (1960–61)
- (Argentina) Martín García Díaz (1962)
- (Chile) Hernán Carrasco (1963)
- (Hungary) Ladislao Pakozdi (1964)
- (Chile) Sergio Cruzat (1965)
- (Argentina) Salvador Biondi (1965–66)
- (Chile) Luis Álamos (1967–69)
- (Chile) Ramiro Cortés (1969)
- (Argentina) Salvador Biondi (1969–70)
- (Chile) José Santos Arias (1971)
- (Chile) Claudio Ramírez (1971)
- (Argentina) Donato Hernández (1972)
- (Chile) Jorge Venegas (1972)
- (Chile) Julio Menadier (1973)
- (Chile) José Cárdenas (1974)
- (Chile) Dante Pesce (1975)
- (Chile) Hernán Godoy (1975–76)
- (Uruguay) Adolfo Rodríguez (1976)
- (Chile) Hernán Godoy (1976–77)
- (Chile) Orlando Aravena (1977)
- (Chile) Armando Tobar (1978)
- (Argentina) (Chile) Néstor Isella (1978–79)
- (Argentina) (Chile) Vicente Cantatore (1979)
- (Chile) Aurelio Valenzuela (1979)
- (Argentina) (Chile) Salvador Biondi (1979)
- (Argentina) (Chile) Néstor Isella (1979–80)
- (Chile) Hernán Godoy (1980–81)
- (Chile) Hugo Berly (1981–82)
- (Chile) Pedro Morales (1982)
- (Chile) Sasha Mitjaew (1983)
- (Chile) Caupolicán Peña (1983)
- (Chile) Roque Mercury (1983)
- (Chile) Jorge Venegas (1984)
- (Chile) Jaime Campos (1984)
- (Chile) Hernán Godoy (1985)
- (Chile) Francisco Hormazábal (1985–86)
- (Chile) Isaac Carrasco (1986)
- (Chile) Rosauro Parra (1986)
- (Chile) Leonel Herrera (1987–88)
- (Chile) Victoriano Álvarez (1988)
- (Chile) Ramón Climent (1988)
- (Chile) Hernán Godoy (1988–90)
- (Chile) Rosauro Parra (1990)
- (Chile) Sasha Mitjaew (1990–91)
- (Chile) Victoriano Álvarez (1991)
- (Chile) José González (1992)
- (Chile) Miguel Hermosilla (1993)
- (Chile) Óscar Meneses (1993–94)
- (Chile) Jorge Aravena (1995)
- (Chile) Roberto Hernández (1996–97)
- (Argentina) Oscar Malbernat (1997–99)
- (Chile) Óscar del Solar (2000–01)
- (Chile) Hernán Godoy (2001–02)
- (Argentina) Claudio Borghi (2002–03)
- (Chile) Roberto Hernández (2003–05)
- (Chile) Jaime Pizarro (2005)
- (Chile) Óscar Meneses (2005)
- (Chile) Eduardo Ahumada (2005)
- (Chile) Raúl Toro (2006–08)
- (Argentina) Pablo Marini (2009–10)
- (Argentina) (Chile) Marcelo Barticciotto (2010)
- (Argentina) Omar Labruna (2010–12)
- (Argentina) Pablo Marini (2012–13)
- (Argentina) Jorge Luis Ghiso (2013)
- (Chile) Jaime Rubilar (2013–14)
- (Chile) Jorge Pellicer (2014–16)
- (Chile) Hugo Vilches (2016–18)
- (Chile) Juan José Ribera (2018–19)
- (Argentina) Francisco Meneghini (2020)
- (Chile) José Calderón (2020)
- (Argentina) Pablo Sánchez (2020–21)
- (Chile) Ronald Fuentes (2022)
- (Chile) Juan José Ribera (2022)
- (Argentina) Manuel Fernández (2023)
- (Chile) José Calderón (2023)
- (Argentina) Luca Marcogiuseppe (2023)
- (Chile) Francisco Arrué (2023)
- (Argentina) Walter Erviti (2024)
- (Chile) Nelson Tapia (2024)
- (Chile) Francisco Arrué (2024)
- (Chile) Juan José Ribera (2024–25)
- (Argentina) Gustavo Lema (2025–26)
- (Argentina) Pablo Álvarez (2026)
- (Argentina) Patricio Graff (2026–)
