= 1957 Campeonato Nacional Primera División =

Campeonato Nacional de Fútbol Profesional
- Dates: 11 May 1957 – 18 January 1958
- Champions: Audax Italiano (4th title)
- Relegated: San Luis
- Matches: 185
- Goals: 672 (3.63 per match)
- Top goalscorer: Gustavo Albella (27 goals)
- Biggest home win: Palestino 7–0 Magallanes (28 November)
- Highest attendance: 38,228 Colo-Colo 4–1 Universidad Católica (23 November)
- Total attendance: 1,343,458
- Average attendance: 7,262

The 1957 Campeonato Nacional de Fútbol Profesional, was the 25th season of top-flight football in Chile. Audax Italiano won their fourth title.

== Scores ==
	AUD	COL	EVE	FEB	GCR	MAG	OHI	PAL	RAN	SLU	UES	UCA	UCH	SWA
Audax		2–1	5–1	2–2	3–2	3–4	3–0	3–3	3–2	2–0	3–2	1–0	1–0	1–0
Colo-Colo	4–5		3–0	2–2	3–0	4–4	5–2	4–4	2–1	2–3	1–2	4–1	1–1	2–1
Everton	0–2	2–3		1–0	2–4	2–1	3–0	1–0	4–1	2–0	3–1	2–1	1–3	2–1
Ferrobádminton	1–2	3–2	2–3		3–2	4–0	4–0	2–1	0–1	2–0	2–3	0–1	1–2	1–3
Green Cross	3–1	3–1	2–4	1–2		4–2	1–1	3–2	2–2	0–2	2–1	4–1	4–4	5–1
Magallanes	3–2	1–2	1–1	2–1	3–1		1–0	3–1	2–1	0–2	1–0	1–2	0–3	1–0
O'Higgins	1–1	1–1	4–3	1–1	3–2	3–1		2–1	0–0	1–2	3–0	0–1	1–1	3–3
Palestino	2–1	1–2	8–3	1–1	3–3	7–0	4–3		2–0	2–1	3–2	4–1	5–2	1–3
Rangers	2–0	1–5	4–1	2–1	1–1	1–0	0–1	1–3		1–0	3–0	2–1	3–1	1–0
San Luis	1–2	2–1	0–2	2–2	3–3	6–2	3–0	0–0	2–1		4–3	3–0	1–1	1–0
U. Española	1–2	4–3	6–0	2–1	3–2	2–2	2–1	6–1	1–0	5–1		4–4	1–1	1–0
U. Católica	2–0	2–0	4–3	1–0	1–1	1–3	0–1	2–5	3–1	1–2	0–0		1–3	0–1
U. de Chile	4–0	3–2	3–3	0–1	4–2	2–2	2–1	1–1	2–2	1–1	3–1	1–1		3–2
S. Wanderers	1–1	2–0	3–0	3–1	2–1	3–3	2–1	4–3	0–1	0–0	3–1	3–3	2–0	

== Standings ==
Pos	Team	Pld	W	D	L	GF	GA	GD	Pts	Qualification or relegation
1	Audax Italiano	26	15	4	7	51	42	+9	34	Champions
2	Universidad de Chile	26	10	11	5	51	41	+10	31	
3	Palestino	26	11	6	9	68	54	+14	28	
4	Santiago Wanderers	26	11	5	10	43	37	+6	27	
5	Unión Española	26	11	4	11	54	49	+5	26	
6	Rangers	26	11	4	11	35	37	−2	26	
7	Everton	26	12	2	12	49	62	−13	26	
8	Colo-Colo	26	10	5	11	60	53	+7	25	
9	Magallanes	26	10	5	11	43	58	−15	25	
10	Green Cross	26	8	7	11	58	58	0	23	
11	Ferrobádminton	26	8	5	13	40	40	0	21	Relegation play-off
12	O'Higgins	26	7	7	12	34	47	−13	21	Relegation play-off
13	Universidad Católica	26	8	5	13	35	49	−14	21	Relegation play-off
14	San Luis	26	12	6	8	42	36	+6	17 (Note: San Luis got sanctioned due to a wrong player registration, with a 13 points reduction, after the relegation play-off were played.)	Relegated to Segunda División

=== Relegation play-off ===
Pos	Team	Pld	W	D	L	GF	GA	GD	Pts
1	O'Higgins	2	1	0	1	4	3	+1	2
2	Ferrobádminton	2	1	0	1	1	1	0	2
3	Universidad Católica	2	1	0	1	3	4	−1	2 (Note: Universidad Católica finally stayed in Primera, due to the sanction against San Luis.)

Notes:

Primera División de Chile
1957 champions
Audax Italiano
4th title

== Topscorer ==
Name	Team	Goals
(Argentina) Gustavo Albella	Green Cross	27
