= Rodrigo Godoy (Chilean footballer) =

Chilean footballer

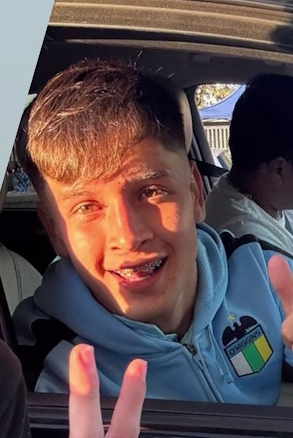
- Godoy with O'Higgins in 2025.

Personal information
- Full name: Rodrigo Alejandro Godoy Tapia
- Date of birth: 7 September 2005 (age 21)
- Place of birth: Graneros, Chile
- Height: 1.73 m (5 ft 8 in)
- Position: Left winger

Team information
- Current team: O'Higgins
- Number: 26

Youth career
- 2014–2024: O'Higgins

Senior career*
Years	Team	Apps	(Gls)
2025–	O'Higgins	21	(0)

International career^{‡}
2025	Chile U20	6	(0)
- * Club domestic league appearances and goals as of 20 September 2025 ‡ National team caps and goals as of 9 October 2025

Rodrigo Alejandro Godoy Tapia (born 7 September 2005) is a Chilean footballer who plays as a left winger for Chilean Primera División side O'Higgins.

== Club career ==
Born in Graneros, Chile, Godoy joined the O'Higgins youth ranks in 2014. With the under-20's, he took part in the 2023 U20 Copa Libertadores and won the 2024 Supercopa Proyección against Colo-Colo. He made his senior debut in the 3–1 win against Rangers de Talca for the Copa Chile on 26 January 2025 and signed his first professional contract on 18 February of the same year, becoming a regular player in the 2025 Primera División.

== International career ==
Godoy has represented Chile at under-20 level in friendlies against New Zealand and was included in the final squad for the 2025 FIFA U20 World Cup.
