= Mario Sandoval (police officer) =

Mario Sandoval was an Argentinian police officer and academic who is considered to be one of the most brutal torturers during the Argentine dictatorship of 1976-1983.

== Biography ==
Sandoval fled to France after the military junta fell and lived in France since 1985. In 1997 he was granted the citizenship of France. He had been an academic in Paris, teaching at the Sorbonne's Institute for Latin American Studies as an external lecturer between 1999 and 2005, and also lectured at the University of Paris-Est Marne-la-Vallée.

In the late 1990s and early 2000s, he was an advisor to the United Self-Defense Forces of Colombia (AUC), a far-right paramilitary group responsible for numerous massacres. He plays a role in the AUC's international relations, organizing meetings in Europe on their behalf.

On July 21, 2001, he took part in a secret gathering near the town of Santa Fe de Ralito. On that day, four paramilitary chiefs and some sixty political leaders gathered with the aim of "building a new Colombia" and, above all, transforming the AUC into a political player. According to Salvatore Mancuso, Mario Sandoval was even involved in drafting the document signed by the elected representatives and the paramilitaries.

In December 2019, he was extradited by France to stand trial in Argentina.

Prosecutors in Argentina based their extradition request on the case of student Hernán Abriata, who disappeared in 1976. The extradition was possible because the crimes he was accused of were committed before obtaining the French citizenship. He is also accused of involvement in 500 other cases. According to The New York Times, "Mr. Abriata was one of about 5,000 people who disappeared at the Higher School of Mechanics of the Navy, or ESMA".

The news of his extradition from France to Argentina was welcomed by Argentine human rights activists and relatives of victims of the dictatorship.

Sandoval was nicknamed Churrasco (Barbecue), due to his preferred method of torture being to electrocute people on metal bed frames.
