= Taha Majni =

Moroccan footballer (born 2007)

Personal information
- Full name: Mohammed Taha Majni
- Date of birth: 11 October 2007 (age 19)
- Place of birth: Casablanca, Morocco
- Height: 1.87 m (6 ft 2 in)
- Position: Defender

Team information
- Current team: Crystal Palace
- Number: 45

Youth career
- 2021–2025: UTS Rabat

Senior career*
Years	Team	Apps	(Gls)
2025–2026	UTS Rabat	19	(0)
2026–	Crystal Palace	0	(0)

International career
2024	Morocco U17	1	(0)
2025	Morocco U18	1	(0)
2025	Morocco U20	7	(0)
2026–	Morocco U23	2	(0)
Medal record
Men's football
Representing Morocco
FIFA U-20 World Cup
Winner	2025 Chile
- * Club domestic league appearances and goals as of 7 September 2026

Mohammed Taha Majni (Arabic: محمد طه المجني; born 11 October 2007) is a Moroccan professional footballer who plays as a defender for Premier League club Crystal Palace.

== Club career ==
=== UTS Rabat ===
Majni was born in Casablanca and trained at UTS Rabat. He was described by the Moroccan press as a "son of Touarga", having completed all his youth training at the Rabat-based club.

Majni was promoted to the reserve team in the off-season of 2025–26, when he was only seventeen years old. He was integrated into a youth project, including Houssam Essadak, Fouad Zahouani and Adam Chakir, which aimed to launch several talented young players into the professional squad, coached by Abdelouahed Zamrat.

During the 2024–25 season, Majni made his professional debut in the Excellence Cup, qualifying for the quarter-finals against Wydad AC (2–0), then reaching the final after a semi-final victory against Wydad Fès (1–0). Majni played in each of these matches, reaching the final which they lost against Olympique Dcheira in Berrechid (2–1).

=== Crystal Palace ===
On 7 September 2026, Crystal Palace announced they had signed Majni, becoming the first player to directly move from a Botola Pro club to a Premier League club.

== International career ==
In March 2024, Majni was called up by Michaël Lebaillif to the Morocco under-17 team for a double friendly against Tunisia.

In September 2025, Majni was called up by Mohamed Ouahbi to take part in the FIFA U-20 World Cup held in Chile. He was the youngest member of the Moroccan squad, being only seventeen years old. His team defeated Spain and Brazil and finished first in their group. During this competition, they reached the final after playing the entirety of the victorious semi-final against France. Morocco defeated Argentina 2–0 in the final, claiming their first-ever world title.

== Honours ==
UTS Rabat

- Excellence Cup runners-up: 2024–25

Morocco U20

- FIFA U-20 World Cup: 2025
