= Haruna Aliyu =

Nigerian footballer (born 2006)

Personal information
- Date of birth: January 2, 2006 (age 20)
- Place of birth: Nigeria
- Position: Centre-back

Team information
- Current team: Wikki Tourists F.C. (on loan from Grass Runner FC)

Senior career*
Years	Team	Apps	(Gls)
2022–2024	Doma United F.C.	45	(0)
2025–	Grass Runner FC	–	(–)
2025–	→ Wikki Tourists F.C. (loan)	3	(0)

International career
2025–	Nigeria U-20		
- * Club domestic league appearances and goals

Haruna Aliyu (born 2 January 2006) is a Nigerian professional footballer who plays as a centre-back for Wikki Tourists F.C., on loan from Grass Runner FC, and the Nigeria U-20 national team.

== Early life ==
Little is publicly documented about Aliyu's early life or youth career prior to his senior debut.

== Club career ==
=== Doma United ===
Aliyu began his professional career with Doma United F.C. in the Nigeria Professional Football League. He made 18 league appearances during the 2022–23 season and 27 in the 2023–24 season.

=== Grass Runner FC and loan to Wikki Tourists ===
Aliyu is contracted to Grass Runner FC, a club competing in Nigeria's Nationwide League One. In 2025, he joined Wikki Tourists F.C. on loan in the Nigeria Professional Football League. His performances for Wikki earned media recognition and led to his call-up to the Nigeria U-20 World Cup squad.

== International career ==
In September 2025, Aliyu was named to the Nigeria U-20 squad for the 2025 FIFA U-20 World Cup in Chile, replacing injured defender Marvelous Freedom. He had earlier featured in a WAFU B qualifying match against Niger, which Nigeria won 3–1.

Aliyu is a left-footed centre-back, noted for his composure, positional awareness, and defensive solidity.
