= Mario Sandoval (footballer, born 2007) =

Chilean footballer

Personal information
- Full name: Mario Eduardo Sandoval Molina
- Date of birth: 7 August 2007 (age 19)
- Place of birth: Quinta Normal, Santiago, Chile
- Height: 1.77 m (5 ft 10 in)
- Position: Midfielder

Team information
- Current team: Audax Italiano
- Number: 6

Youth career
- 2013–2024: Audax Italiano

Senior career*
Years	Team	Apps	(Gls)
2024–	Audax Italiano	20	(0)

International career^{‡}
2023	Chile U16	2	(0)
2025–	Chile U20	10	(0)
- * Club domestic league appearances and goals as of 23 February 2026 ‡ National team caps and goals as of 12 June 2026

Mario Eduardo Sandoval Molina (born 7 August 2007) is a Chilean footballer who plays as a midfielder for Chilean Primera División side Audax Italiano.

== Club career ==
Born in Quinta Normal commune, Santiago de Chile, Sandoval joined the Audax Italiano youth ranks in 2013. He made his senior debut in the 1–2 loss against Everton de Viña del Mar on 28 August 2024 for the Chilean Primera División, aged 17, and signed his first professional contract on 27 March 2025.

== International career ==
Sandoval represented Chile at under-16 level in the 2023 UEFA's youth development tournament.

In 2025, Sandoval represented the under-20's at the FIFA U20 World Cup. He was the youngest player in the squad and made 3 appearances at the group stage. In February 2026, he was called up to a training microcycle with views to the 2027 South American Championship..

Sandoval was called up to the Chile under-20 squad for the friendly matches against Brazil on 6 and 9 June 2026. In September of the same year, he represented them at the South American Games.
