= Houssam Essadak =

Moroccan footballer

Hossam Essadak
Personal information
- Date of birth: 30 July 2005 (age 21)
- Place of birth: Casablanca, Morocco
- Height: 1.80 m (5 ft 11 in)
- Position: Attacking midfielder

Team information
- Current team: Union Touarga
- Number: 31

Youth career
- –2024: Mohammed VI Football Academy

Senior career*
Years	Team	Apps	(Gls)
2024–	Union Touarga	25	(3)

International career^{‡}
2022–	Morocco U20	18	(1)
2025–	Morocco A'	0	(0)
Medal record
Men's football
Representing Morocco
FIFA U-20 World Cup
Winner	2025 Chile
- * Club domestic league appearances and goals as of 18 May 2025 ‡ National team caps and goals as of 18 May 2025

Hossam Essadak (Arabic: حسام الصادق; born 30 July 2005) is a Moroccan professional footballer who plays the role of an attacking midfielder for Union Touarga and the Morocco A' national team.

== Club career ==
Essadak was developed at the Mohammed VI Football Academy.

On 31 January 2024, he signed for Union Touarga. He made his professional debut a week later in the Botola Pro against MC Oujda, a 2–0 victory. Two months later, he earned his first start against Fath Union Sport, in a 1–1 draw. At the end of the 2023–24 season, he scored his first professional goal in a 3–1 away win against Olympic Safi.

== International career ==
In November 2024, Essadak was part of the Morocco U20 squad who won the UNAF U-20 Tournament at home, qualifying for the 2025 U-20 Africa Cup of Nations.

In April 2025, he was called up by coach Mohamed Ouahbi for the Africa U-20 Cup of Nations. On 15 May 2025, Essadak helped Morocco reach the final with a 1–0 win over Egypt U20, being named man of the match.

== Honours ==
Morocco

- African Nations Championship: 2024

Morocco U20

- U-20 Africa Cup of Nations runner-up: 2025
- UNAF U-20 Tournament: 2024
- FIFA U-20 World Cup: 2025

Individual

- Africa U-20 Cup of Nations Team of the Tournament: 2025
