= 2025–26 Mamelodi Sundowns F.C. season =

South African football team season

Mamelodi Sundowns
2025–26 season
- Owner: Patrice Motsepe
- Chairman: Tlhopie Motsepe
- Head coach: Miguel Cardoso
- Stadium: Lucas Masterpieces Moripe Stadium; Loftus Versfeld Stadium
- Premiership: Runners Up
- MTN 8: Semi-finals
- Nedbank Cup: Round Of 16
- Champions League: Winners
- FIFA Club World Cup: Group Stage
Home colours	Away colours	Third colours

The 2025-26 season was the Mamelodi Sundowns 30th consecutive Season in the South African Premiership.During this season the club will have participated in the following competitions: 2025 FIFA Club World Cup, 2025–26 South African Premiership, 2025 MTN 8, 2025–26 Nedbank Cup, 2025–26 CAF Champions League.

== Players ==
As of September 27, 2026

Note: Flags indicate national team as defined under FIFA eligibility rules; some limited exceptions apply. Players may hold more than one non-FIFA nationality.

No.	Pos.	Nation	Player
1	GK	UGA	Denis Onyango
2	DF	RSA	Malibongwe Khoza
3	DF	RSA	Khulumani Ndamane
4	MF	RSA	Teboho Mokoena
5	DF	ZIM	Divine Lunga
6	DF	RSA	Aubrey Modiba
9	FW	BRA	Arthur Sales
10	MF	POR	Nuno Santos
11	MF	CHI	Marcelo Allende
12	FW	COL	Brayan León
13	FW	RSA	Iqraam Rayners
14	FW	RSA	Monnapule Saleng
15	MF	RSA	Bathusi Aubaas
17	FW	RSA	Tashreeq Matthews
18	MF	RSA	Themba Zwane (captain)
19	MF	RSA	Thabo Cele
20	DF	RSA	Grant Kekana
21	MF	RSA	Sphelele Mkhulise
22	DF	RSA	Thabang Matuludi
23	DF	RSA	Fawaaz Basadien

No.	Pos.	Nation	Player
24	DF	RSA	Keanu Cupido
25	DF	RSA	Khuliso Mudau
26	GK	RSA	Reyaad Pieterse
27	DF	RSA	Thapelo Morena
28	DF	RSA	Zuko Mdunyelwa
29	FW	RSA	Antonio van Wyk
30	GK	RSA	Ronwen Williams (vice-captain)
31	GK	RSA	Ricardo Goss
33	FW	RSA	Cassius Mailula
34	MF	RSA	Tsiki Ntsabeleng
35	FW	RSA	Lebo Mothiba
37	DF	RSA	Kegan Johannes
38	FW	RSA	Siyanda Ndlovu
40	DF	RSA	Mothobi Mvala
43	FW	RSA	Kutlwano Letlhaku
44	MF	RSA	Gomolemo Kekana
45	DF	RSA	Wandile Dube
46	FW	RSA	Bennet Mokoena
47	DF	RSA	Deano van Rooyen

=== Players under contract ===
Note: Flags indicate national team as defined under FIFA eligibility rules; some limited exceptions apply. Players may hold more than one non-FIFA nationality.

No.	Pos.	Nation	Player
—	MF	ARG	Matías Esquivel
—	FW	RSA	Jody Ah Shene
—	FW	RSA	Siyabonga Mabena

=== Out on loan ===
Note: Flags indicate national team as defined under FIFA eligibility rules; some limited exceptions apply. Players may hold more than one non-FIFA nationality.

No.	Pos.	Nation	Player
—	GK	RSA	Jody February (at Siwelele until 30 June 2027)
—	MF	RSA	Terrence Mashego (at Stellenbosch until 30 June 2027)

No.	Pos.	Nation	Player
—	MF	RSA	Neo Maema (at Simba until 30 June 2027)
—	MF	RSA	Thato Sibiya (at Lille until 30 June 2027)

== Competitions ==
=== Premiership ===
==== League Position ====
Pos	Team	Pld	W	D	L	GF	GA	GD	Pts	Qualification or relegation
1	Orlando Pirates (C)	30	21	6	3	58	12	+46	69	Qualification for CAF Champions League
2	Mamelodi Sundowns	30	20	8	2	57	21	+36	68	Qualification for CAF Champions League
3	Kaizer Chiefs	30	15	9	6	33	19	+14	54	Qualification for CAF Confederation Cup
4	AmaZulu	30	13	8	9	32	28	+4	47	
5	Sekhukhune United	30	11	11	8	32	27	+5	44	
6	Lamontville Golden Arrows	30	11	8	11	34	33	+1	41	
7	Polokwane City	30	9	13	8	21	21	0	40	
8	Durban City	30	10	9	11	25	26	−1	39	Qualification for CAF Confederation Cup
9	Stellenbosch	30	9	10	11	26	30	−4	37	
10	Siwelele	30	8	13	9	24	28	−4	37	
11	Richards Bay	30	7	13	10	23	30	−7	34	
12	TS Galaxy	30	8	8	14	30	38	−8	32	
13	Chippa United	30	6	10	14	24	44	−20	28	
14	Marumo Gallants	30	4	13	13	21	38	−17	25	
15	Magesi (R)	30	5	9	16	24	43	−19	24	Qualification for Playoffs
16	Orbit College (R)	30	6	6	18	21	47	−26	24	Relegation to National First Division

Source: Premier Soccer League
(C) Champions; (R) Relegated

==== Matches ====
9 August 2025 1	Chippa United	1-1	Mamelodi Sundowns	East London
15:00	Khaya Mfecane 65'; Seun Ndlovu (yellow card) 90+7'	Report	Sales 32'; Mokoena (yellow card) 90+1'	Stadium: Buffalo City Stadium; Referee: (South Africa) Philangenkosi Khumalo

12 August 2025 2	Mamelodi Sundowns	2-0	AmaZulu	Pretoria
19:30	Rayners 53'; Matthews 90+1'	Report		Stadium: Loftus Versfeld Stadium; Referee: (South Africa) Siyabulela Qunta

20 August 2025 3	Magesi	0-2	Mamelodi Sundowns	Seshego
19:30	Tlou Masegela (yellow card) 53'; Lehlohonolo Mtshali (yellow card) 73' (yellow-red card) 79'	Report	Kekana (yellow card) 1'; Adams 73'; Shalulile 87'	Stadium: Seshego Stadium; Referee: (South Africa) Tshidiso Mkwanazi

=== MTN 8 ===
3 August 2025 Quarter-finals	Mamelodi Sundowns	4–0	Richards Bay	Pretoria
18:00	Rayners 10' 54'; Simphiwe Mcineka 45+2' (o.g.); Modiba (yellow card) 72'; Mabena 76'	Report		Stadium: Lucas Moripe Stadium; Referee: (South Africa) T H Ndzandzeka

16 August 2025 Semi-finals First Leg	Orlando Pirates	1–1	Mamelodi Sundowns	Soweto
15:00	Maswanganyi (yellow card) 61'; Sebelebele 87'	Report	Mokoena 36' (yellow card) 72'	Stadium: Orlando Stadium; Referee: (South Africa) L Badi

23 August 2025 Semi-finals Second Leg	Mamelodi Sundowns	1–1	Orlando Pirates	Pretoria
15:00 SAST	Rayners 17'	Report	Sebelebele 73'	Stadium: Lucas Masterpieces Moripe Stadium
	Penalties
	Mokoena (penalty missed); Allende (penalty missed); Mothiba (penalty scored)		(penalty scored) Hotto; (penalty scored) Mariko; (penalty scored) Mbule; (penalty scored) Mabasa

2–2 on aggregate; Orlando Pirates won 4–1 on penalties.

=== Nedbank Cup ===
4 February 2026 Round of 32	Mamelodi Sundowns	2–1	Gomora United	Pretoria
19:00 SAST	Shalulile 41'; Morena 61'	Report	Maoke 45+2'	Stadium: Loftus Versfeld Stadium

21 February 2026 Round of 16	TS Galaxy	2–0	Mamelodi Sundowns	KwaMhlanga
15:00 SAST	Ngwenya 19' Zindoga 33' (pen.)	Report		Stadium: Solomon Mahlangu Stadium

=== CAF Champions League ===
==== Qualifying Rounds ====
Second Round; First Leg	–

=== FIFA Club World Cup ===
==== Group Stage ====
Pos	Team	Pld	W	D	L	GF	GA	GD	Pts	Qualification
1	(Germany) Borussia Dortmund	3	2	1	0	5	3	+2	7	Advance to knockout stage
2	(Brazil) Fluminense	3	1	2	0	4	2	+2	5	Advance to knockout stage
3	(South Africa) Mamelodi Sundowns	3	1	1	1	4	4	0	4	
4	(South Korea) Ulsan HD	3	0	0	3	2	6	−4	0	

Source: FIFA
Rules for classification: Group stage tiebreakers

17 June 2025 1	Ulsan HD (South Korea)	0–1	(South Africa) Mamelodi Sundowns	Orlando, United States
7:05 pm EDT (Note: The Ulsan HD vs Mamelodi Sundowns match, originally scheduled for 6:00 pm EDT, was delayed to 7:05 pm due to adverse weather conditions.)	Bojanić (yellow card) 55'	Report	Rayners 36'; Mokoena (yellow card) 85'	Stadium: Inter&Co Stadium; Attendance: 3,412; Referee: Clément Turpin (France)

21 June 2025 2	Mamelodi Sundowns (South Africa)	3–4	(Germany) Borussia Dortmund	Cincinnati, United States
12:00 EDT (UTC−4)	Ribeiro 11'; Rayners 62'; Matthews (yellow card) 66'; Mothiba 90'; Allende (yellow card) 90+5'	Report	Nmecha 16'; Guirassy 34'; Bellingham 45'; Mudau 59' (o.g.); Chukwuemeka (yellow card) 64'; Beier (yellow card) 85'	Stadium: TQL Stadium; Attendance: 14,006; Referee: Juan Gabriel Benítez (Paraguay)

25 June 2025 3	Mamelodi Sundowns (South Africa)	0–0	(Brazil) Fluminense	Miami Gardens, United States
15:00 EDT (UTC−4)	Mokoena (yellow card) 10'; Letlhaku (yellow card) 90+6'	Report	Arias (yellow card) 88'; Bernal (yellow card) 89'; Renê (yellow card) 90+5'	Stadium: Hard Rock Stadium; Attendance: 14,312; Referee: Anthony Taylor (England)
