= 2025 FIFA Club World Cup squads =

Club squads of 2025 FIFA Club World Cup

The 2025 FIFA Club World Cup was an international soccer tournament held in the United States from June 14 to July 13, 2025. The 32 clubs involved in the tournament were required to register an initial squad of between 26 and 35 players, including three goalkeepers. Only players in these squads were eligible to take part in the tournament.

A provisional squad list of between 26 and 50 players, including four goalkeepers, had to be submitted by each club to FIFA. The provisional lists were not made public by FIFA, with changes allowed prior to the submission of the final list (including for newly registered players). From June 1 to 10, 2025, the member associations of all participating clubs implemented an extraordinary transfer window to allow for the registration of newly signed players. From the provisional squad, the final list of at least 26 and at most 35 players per club was submitted to FIFA by 10 June, four days prior to the opening match of the tournament. FIFA published the final lists with squad numbers on their website on June 11. During the competition, clubs could make limited changes to their final list from June 27 to July 3, should the club's member association have a transfer window open during this period. However, no player could appear for two clubs during the tournament. In the event that a goalkeeper on the submitted squad list suffered from an injury or illness prior to or during the tournament, that player could be replaced at any time. The club doctor and the FIFA Tournament Medical Lead had to both confirm that the injury or illness was severe enough to prevent the player from participating in the tournament.

Players could wear squad numbers between 1 and 99, provided they were registered with the same number in the club's most recent domestic league season. While clubs could name up to 35 players, only 26 players (11 starters and 15 substitutes) could be selected to participate in each match.

As the tournament started four days after the conclusion of an international window, clubs were only required to arrive three to five days before their first match. This scheduling was criticized for giving players an inadequate amount of rest prior to the start of the tournament. While clubs were required to submit their official squads to FIFA, not all registered players necessarily traveled to the tournament. (Note: For example, Porto named an official 34-player initial list, while only 28 players were part of the traveling squad.)

The position listed for each player is per the official squad list published by FIFA. The age listed for each player is as of June 14, 2025, the first day of the tournament. The nationality for each player reflects the national team they are eligible for as defined under FIFA eligibility rules.

== Player eligibility and transfer rules ==
During the duration of the tournament, participating clubs were not required to release players to their national teams for tournaments in the FIFA calendar (namely the 2025 CONCACAF Gold Cup). However, clubs were still required to release players for the international window immediately prior to the tournament, from June 2 to 10, 2025.

In order to be eligible, all players in each squad had to be duly registered with their club in accordance with the both regulations of FIFA and the relevant member association. Clubs are also required to field their strongest teams throughout the competition.

The potential impact of transfers on the tournament was questioned, as the transfer window was open in many leagues during the tournament, and thus players in the tournament could potentially be moved to a different club during the tournament, including to other participating clubs. In addition, many player contracts in Europe expired on June 30, which could have affected the participation of some players. In view of this, in October 2024 the FIFA Council finalized the rules on transfers for the tournament, with the intent to "equalise inconsistencies created by differences in registration periods and domestic-season timings between participating clubs to the greatest extent possible". Therefore, all member associations of participating clubs were given the option of opening an extraordinary registration window from June 1 to 10, 2025, which applied to all clubs of the relevant member association. This allowed for clubs to register new signings prior to the start of the competition, instead of being limited by the usual transfer window dates, often which opened on July 1. While opening the additional window remained at the full discretion of the member associations, all twenty associations with participating clubs did so.

Additionally, as the transfer window for many FIFA member associations opened during the course of the tournament, clubs could make changes to the final list between June 27 to July 3, 2025, subject to the following conditions:

- Clubs could replace players whose contracts expired during the tournament.
- Clubs could register up to two additional players to their final list, not counting towards the 35-player limit.
- No more than six players in total could be added.
- Any player added had to be registered for their club with the relevant member association during that association's standard registration window.
- Any player added was only eligible to play in the next match if FIFA was notified at least 48 hours before kick-off.

However, for players and coaches with a contract ending or transfer planned during the tournament, FIFA's objective was to "encourage clubs and players whose contracts are expiring to find an appropriate solution to facilitate the players' participation".

While players typically could only be registered with up to three clubs during a single season, and be eligible to play official matches for two clubs within this period, matches at the Club World Cup did not count towards this restriction. Should two clubs have included the same player on their respective provisional lists, the FIFA general secretariat would have decided which club the player would represent after hearing all concerned parties. While clubs could make changes to their final list during the competition, no player could represent multiple clubs during the tournament.

== Group A ==
=== Al Ahly ===
Manager: (Spain) José Riveiro

Egyptian club Al Ahly named a 28-player final squad.

No.	Pos.	Nation	Player	Date of birth (age)
1	GK	(Egypt) EGY	Mohamed El Shenawy (captain)	December 18, 1988 (aged 36)
2	DF	(Egypt) EGY	Khaled Abdelfattah	January 22, 1999 (aged 26)
3	DF	(Egypt) EGY	Omar Kamal	September 29, 1993 (aged 31)
4	DF	(Egypt) EGY	Ahmed Ramadan	March 23, 1997 (aged 28)
5	MF	(Tunisia) TUN	Mohamed Ali Ben Romdhane	September 6, 1999 (aged 25)
6	DF	(Egypt) EGY	Yasser Ibrahim	February 10, 1993 (aged 32)
7	MF	(Egypt) EGY	Trézéguet	October 1, 1994 (aged 30)
8	MF	(Egypt) EGY	Hamdy Fathy	September 29, 1994 (aged 30)
9	FW	(Palestine) PLE	Wessam Abou Ali	January 4, 1999 (aged 26)
10	FW	(Slovenia) SLO	Nejc Gradišar	August 6, 2002 (aged 22)
11	DF	(Egypt) EGY	Karim El Debes	June 3, 2003 (aged 22)
13	MF	(Egypt) EGY	Marwan Attia	August 1, 1998 (aged 26)
14	MF	(Egypt) EGY	Hussein El Shahat	June 21, 1992 (aged 32)
15	DF	(Morocco) MAR	Achraf Dari	May 6, 1999 (aged 26)
17	MF	(Morocco) MAR	Achraf Bencharki	September 24, 1994 (aged 30)
19	MF	(Egypt) EGY	Mohamed Magdy	March 6, 1996 (aged 29)
22	MF	(Egypt) EGY	Emam Ashour	February 20, 1998 (aged 27)
23	MF	(Mali) MLI	Aliou Dieng	October 16, 1997 (aged 27)
24	MF	(Egypt) EGY	Ahmed Reda Hashem	February 19, 2000 (aged 25)
25	MF	(Egypt) EGY	Zizo	January 10, 1996 (aged 29)
26	GK	(Egypt) EGY	Mohamed Seha	May 1, 2001 (aged 24)
27	DF	(Egypt) EGY	Mostafa El Aash	October 11, 2000 (aged 24)
29	MF	(Egypt) EGY	Taher Mohamed	March 7, 1997 (aged 28)
30	DF	(Egypt) EGY	Mohamed Hany	February 2, 1996 (aged 29)
31	GK	(Egypt) EGY	Mostafa Shobeir	May 15, 2000 (aged 25)
36	MF	(Egypt) EGY	Ahmed Nabil Koka	July 4, 2001 (aged 23)
37	GK	(Egypt) EGY	Mostafa Makhlouf	March 11, 2003 (aged 22)
54	DF	(Morocco) MAR	Yahya Attiyat Allah	March 2, 1995 (aged 30)

=== Inter Miami CF ===
Manager: (Argentina) Javier Mascherano

American club Inter Miami CF named a 29-player final squad.

No.	Pos.	Nation	Player	Date of birth (age)
1	GK	(United States) USA	Drake Callender	October 7, 1997 (aged 27)
2	DF	(Argentina) ARG	Gonzalo Luján	April 27, 2001 (aged 24)
5	MF	(Spain) ESP	Sergio Busquets	July 16, 1988 (aged 36)
6	DF	(Argentina) ARG	Tomás Avilés	February 3, 2004 (aged 21)
7	FW	(Haiti) HAI	Fafà Picault	February 23, 1991 (aged 34)
8	MF	(Venezuela) VEN	Telasco Segovia	April 2, 2003 (aged 22)
9	FW	(Uruguay) URU	Luis Suárez	January 24, 1987 (aged 38)
10	FW	(Argentina) ARG	Lionel Messi (captain)	June 24, 1987 (aged 37)
11	MF	(Argentina) ARG	Baltasar Rodríguez	July 9, 2003 (aged 21)
14	DF	(Paraguay) PAR	David Martínez	January 21, 1998 (aged 27)
15	DF	(United States) USA	Ryan Sailor	November 27, 1998 (aged 26)
17	DF	(Jamaica) JAM	Ian Fray	August 31, 2002 (aged 22)
18	DF	(Spain) ESP	Jordi Alba	March 21, 1989 (aged 36)
19	GK	(Argentina) ARG	Oscar Ustari	July 3, 1986 (aged 38)
21	FW	(Argentina) ARG	Tadeo Allende	February 20, 1999 (aged 26)
22	FW	(Brazil) BRA	Leo Afonso	July 13, 2001 (aged 23)
25	GK	(United States) USA	William Yarbrough	March 20, 1989 (aged 36)
26	DF	(United States) USA	Tyler Hall	February 5, 2006 (aged 19)
29	FW	(Ecuador) ECU	Allen Obando	June 13, 2006 (aged 19)
30	MF	(United States) USA	Benjamin Cremaschi	March 2, 2005 (aged 20)
32	DF	(Greece) GRE	Noah Allen	April 28, 2004 (aged 21)
34	GK	(Argentina) ARG	Rocco Ríos Novo	June 4, 2002 (aged 23)
37	DF	(Uruguay) URU	Maximiliano Falcón	May 1, 1997 (aged 28)
41	MF	(Honduras) HON	David Ruiz	February 8, 2004 (aged 21)
42	MF	(Italy) ITA	Yannick Bright	September 3, 2001 (aged 23)
55	MF	(Argentina) ARG	Federico Redondo	January 18, 2003 (aged 22)
57	DF	(Argentina) ARG	Marcelo Weigandt	January 11, 2000 (aged 25)
62	DF	(Dominican Republic) DOM	Israel Boatwright	June 2, 2005 (aged 20)
81	MF	(United States) USA	Santiago Morales	February 9, 2007 (aged 18)

=== Palmeiras ===
Manager: (Portugal) Abel Ferreira

Brazilian club Palmeiras named a 29-player final squad.

No.	Pos.	Nation	Player	Date of birth (age)
1	GK	(Brazil) BRA	Mateus	May 2, 2002 (aged 23)
2	DF	(Brazil) BRA	Marcos Rocha	December 11, 1988 (aged 36)
3	DF	(Brazil) BRA	Bruno Fuchs	April 1, 1999 (aged 26)
4	DF	(Argentina) ARG	Agustín Giay	January 16, 2004 (aged 21)
5	MF	(Argentina) ARG	Aníbal Moreno	May 13, 1999 (aged 26)
6	DF	(Brazil) BRA	Vanderlan	September 7, 2002 (aged 22)
7	MF	(Brazil) BRA	Felipe Anderson	April 15, 1993 (aged 32)
8	MF	(Colombia) COL	Richard Ríos	June 2, 2000 (aged 25)
9	FW	(Brazil) BRA	Vitor Roque	February 28, 2005 (aged 20)
10	FW	(Brazil) BRA	Paulinho	July 15, 2000 (aged 24)
12	DF	(Brazil) BRA	Mayke	November 10, 1992 (aged 32)
13	DF	(Brazil) BRA	Micael	August 12, 2000 (aged 24)
14	GK	(Brazil) BRA	Marcelo Lomba	December 18, 1986 (aged 38)
15	DF	(Paraguay) PAR	Gustavo Gómez (captain)	May 6, 1993 (aged 32)
17	FW	(Uruguay) URU	Facundo Torres	April 13, 2000 (aged 25)
18	FW	(Brazil) BRA	Maurício	June 22, 2001 (aged 23)
21	GK	(Brazil) BRA	Weverton	December 13, 1987 (aged 37)
22	DF	(Uruguay) URU	Joaquín Piquerez	August 24, 1998 (aged 26)
23	MF	(Brazil) BRA	Raphael Veiga	June 19, 1995 (aged 29)
26	DF	(Brazil) BRA	Murilo	March 27, 1997 (aged 28)
30	MF	(Brazil) BRA	Lucas Evangelista	February 6, 1995 (aged 30)
31	FW	(Brazil) BRA	Luighi	April 30, 2006 (aged 19)
32	MF	(Uruguay) URU	Emiliano Martínez	August 17, 1999 (aged 25)
34	DF	(Brazil) BRA	Kaiky Naves	May 8, 2002 (aged 23)
39	FW	(Brazil) BRA	Thalys	February 22, 2005 (aged 20)
40	MF	(Brazil) BRA	Allan	April 19, 2004 (aged 21)
41	FW	(Brazil) BRA	Estêvão	April 24, 2007 (aged 18)
42	FW	(Argentina) ARG	José Manuel López	December 6, 2000 (aged 24)
43	DF	(Brazil) BRA	Luiz Benedetti	June 7, 2006 (aged 19)

=== Porto ===
Manager: (Argentina) Martín Anselmi

Portuguese club Porto named a 34-player final squad. Goalkeeper Samuel Portugal was replaced by Gonçalo Ribeiro on June 21.

No.	Pos.	Nation	Player	Date of birth (age)
4	DF	(Brazil) BRA	Otávio	April 21, 2002 (aged 23)
5	DF	(Spain) ESP	Iván Marcano	June 23, 1987 (aged 37)
6	MF	(Canada) CAN	Stephen Eustáquio	December 21, 1996 (aged 28)
7	FW	(Brazil) BRA	William Gomes	March 15, 2006 (aged 19)
9	FW	(Spain) ESP	Samu Aghehowa	May 5, 2004 (aged 21)
10	MF	(Portugal) POR	Fábio Vieira	May 30, 2000 (aged 25)
11	FW	(Brazil) BRA	Pepê	February 24, 1997 (aged 28)
12	DF	(Nigeria) NGR	Zaidu Sanusi	June 13, 1997 (aged 28)
14	GK	(Portugal) POR	Cláudio Ramos	November 16, 1991 (aged 33)
15	MF	(Portugal) POR	Vasco Sousa	April 3, 2003 (aged 22)
17	MF	(Spain) ESP	Gabri Veiga	May 27, 2002 (aged 23)
19	FW	(Cameroon) CMR	Danny Namaso	August 28, 2000 (aged 24)
20	MF	(Portugal) POR	André Franco	April 12, 1998 (aged 27)
22	MF	(Argentina) ARG	Alan Varela	July 4, 2001 (aged 23)
23	DF	(Portugal) POR	João Mário	January 3, 2000 (aged 25)
24	DF	(Argentina) ARG	Nehuén Pérez	June 24, 2000 (aged 24)
25	MF	(Argentina) ARG	Tomás Pérez	August 26, 2005 (aged 19)
27	FW	(Turkey) TUR	Deniz Gül	July 2, 2004 (aged 20)
47	FW	(Spain) ESP	Ángel Alarcón	May 15, 2004 (aged 21)
51	GK	(Portugal) POR	Diogo Fernandes	February 17, 2005 (aged 20)
52	DF	(Portugal) POR	Martim Fernandes	January 18, 2006 (aged 19)
68	MF	(Portugal) POR	André Oliveira	October 1, 2005 (aged 19)
70	FW	(Portugal) POR	Gonçalo Borges	March 29, 2001 (aged 24)
73	DF	(Portugal) POR	Gabriel Brás	March 25, 2004 (aged 21)
74	DF	(Portugal) POR	Francisco Moura	August 16, 1999 (aged 25)
79	FW	(Croatia) CRO	Leonardo Vonić	July 10, 2003 (aged 21)
86	FW	(Portugal) POR	Rodrigo Mora	May 5, 2007 (aged 18)
87	FW	(Colombia) COL	Brayan Caicedo	August 14, 2006 (aged 18)
88	MF	(Angola) ANG	Domingos Andrade	May 7, 2003 (aged 22)
90	MF	(Portugal) POR	Gil Martins	May 12, 2006 (aged 19)
91	GK	(Portugal) POR	Gonçalo Ribeiro (from June 21)	January 15, 2006 (aged 19)
92	MF	(Portugal) POR	João Teixeira	April 9, 2006 (aged 19)
94	GK	(Brazil) BRA	Samuel Portugal (until June 21)	March 29, 1994 (aged 31)
97	DF	(Portugal) POR	Zé Pedro	June 6, 1997 (aged 28)
99	GK	(Portugal) POR	Diogo Costa (captain)	September 19, 1999 (aged 25)

== Group B ==
=== Atlético Madrid ===
Manager: (Argentina) Diego Simeone

Spanish club Atlético Madrid named a 34-player final squad.

No.	Pos.	Nation	Player	Date of birth (age)
1	GK	(Argentina) ARG	Juan Musso	May 6, 1994 (aged 31)
2	DF	(Uruguay) URU	José María Giménez	January 20, 1995 (aged 30)
3	DF	(Spain) ESP	César Azpilicueta	August 28, 1989 (aged 35)
4	MF	(England) ENG	Conor Gallagher	February 6, 2000 (aged 25)
5	MF	(Argentina) ARG	Rodrigo De Paul	May 24, 1994 (aged 31)
6	MF	(Spain) ESP	Koke (captain)	January 8, 1992 (aged 33)
7	FW	(France) FRA	Antoine Griezmann	March 21, 1991 (aged 34)
8	MF	(Spain) ESP	Pablo Barrios	June 15, 2003 (aged 21)
9	FW	(Norway) NOR	Alexander Sørloth	December 5, 1995 (aged 29)
10	FW	(Argentina) ARG	Ángel Correa	March 9, 1995 (aged 30)
11	MF	(France) FRA	Thomas Lemar	November 12, 1995 (aged 29)
12	MF	(Brazil) BRA	Samuel Lino	December 23, 1999 (aged 25)
13	GK	(Slovenia) SLO	Jan Oblak	January 7, 1993 (aged 32)
14	MF	(Spain) ESP	Marcos Llorente	January 30, 1995 (aged 30)
15	DF	(France) FRA	Clément Lenglet	June 17, 1995 (aged 29)
16	DF	(Argentina) ARG	Nahuel Molina	April 6, 1998 (aged 27)
17	MF	(Spain) ESP	Rodrigo Riquelme	April 2, 2000 (aged 25)
18	FW	(Spain) ESP	Carlos Martín	April 22, 2002 (aged 23)
19	FW	(Argentina) ARG	Julián Alvarez	January 31, 2000 (aged 25)
20	MF	(Belgium) BEL	Axel Witsel	January 12, 1989 (aged 36)
21	DF	(Spain) ESP	Javi Galán	November 19, 1994 (aged 30)
22	FW	(Argentina) ARG	Giuliano Simeone	December 18, 2002 (aged 22)
23	DF	(Mozambique) MOZ	Reinildo Mandava	January 21, 1994 (aged 31)
24	DF	(Spain) ESP	Robin Le Normand	November 11, 1996 (aged 28)
27	DF	(Greece) GRE	Ilias Kostis	February 27, 2003 (aged 22)
29	MF	(Spain) ESP	Javi Serrano	January 16, 2003 (aged 22)
30	DF	(Spain) ESP	Javier Boñar	June 3, 2005 (aged 20)
31	GK	(Spain) ESP	Antonio Gomis	May 20, 2003 (aged 22)
32	FW	(Spain) ESP	Adrián Niño	June 19, 2004 (aged 20)
34	GK	(Spain) ESP	Salvi Esquivel	September 30, 2005 (aged 19)
37	MF	(Spain) ESP	Jano Monserrate	January 28, 2006 (aged 19)
38	MF	(Spain) ESP	Taufik Seidu	January 20, 2008 (aged 17)
40	MF	(Spain) ESP	Rayane Belaid	February 11, 2005 (aged 20)
47	FW	(Spain) ESP	Omar Janneh	August 23, 2006 (aged 18)

=== Botafogo ===
Manager: (Portugal) Renato Paiva

Brazilian club Botafogo named a 35-player final squad.

No.	Pos.	Nation	Player	Date of birth (age)
1	GK	(Brazil) BRA	Raul	July 28, 1997 (aged 27)
2	DF	(Brazil) BRA	Vitinho	July 23, 1999 (aged 25)
4	DF	(Uruguay) URU	Mateo Ponte	May 24, 2003 (aged 22)
5	MF	(Brazil) BRA	Danilo Barbosa	February 28, 1996 (aged 29)
6	MF	(Brazil) BRA	Patrick de Paula	September 8, 1999 (aged 25)
7	FW	(Brazil) BRA	Artur	February 15, 1998 (aged 27)
8	MF	(Argentina) ARG	Álvaro Montoro	April 17, 2007 (aged 18)
9	FW	(Brazil) BRA	Rwan Cruz	May 20, 2001 (aged 24)
10	MF	(Venezuela) VEN	Jefferson Savarino	November 11, 1996 (aged 28)
11	FW	(Brazil) BRA	Matheus Martins	July 16, 2003 (aged 21)
12	GK	(Brazil) BRA	John Victor	February 13, 1996 (aged 29)
13	DF	(Brazil) BRA	Alex Telles	December 15, 1992 (aged 32)
15	DF	(Angola) ANG	Bastos	March 27, 1991 (aged 34)
16	FW	(Brazil) BRA	Nathan Fernandes	February 16, 2005 (aged 20)
17	MF	(Brazil) BRA	Marlon Freitas (captain)	March 27, 1995 (aged 30)
18	MF	(Brazil) BRA	Kauê	October 22, 2004 (aged 20)
19	FW	(Brazil) BRA	Kayke	June 19, 2006 (aged 18)
20	DF	(Argentina) ARG	Alexander Barboza	March 16, 1995 (aged 30)
21	DF	(Brazil) BRA	Marçal	February 19, 1989 (aged 36)
23	MF	(Uruguay) URU	Santiago Rodríguez	January 8, 2000 (aged 25)
24	GK	(Brazil) BRA	Léo Linck	March 3, 2001 (aged 24)
25	MF	(Brazil) BRA	Allan	January 8, 1991 (aged 34)
26	MF	(Brazil) BRA	Gregore	March 2, 1994 (aged 31)
28	MF	(Brazil) BRA	Newton	March 12, 2000 (aged 25)
30	FW	(Argentina) ARG	Joaquín Correa	August 13, 1994 (aged 30)
31	DF	(Brazil) BRA	Kaio Pantaleão	September 8, 1995 (aged 29)
32	DF	(Brazil) BRA	Jair Cunha	March 7, 2005 (aged 20)
39	FW	(Uruguay) URU	Gonzalo Mastriani	April 28, 1993 (aged 32)
40	GK	(Ecuador) ECU	Cristhian Loor	March 9, 2006 (aged 19)
47	FW	(Brazil) BRA	Jeffinho	December 30, 1999 (aged 25)
57	DF	(Brazil) BRA	David Ricardo	December 21, 2002 (aged 22)
66	DF	(Brazil) BRA	Cuiabano	February 16, 2003 (aged 22)
77	MF	(Brazil) BRA	Kauan Lindes	November 28, 2003 (aged 21)
98	FW	(Brazil) BRA	Arthur Cabral	April 25, 1998 (aged 27)
99	FW	(Brazil) BRA	Igor Jesus	February 25, 2001 (aged 24)

=== Paris Saint-Germain ===
Manager: (Spain) Luis Enrique

French club Paris Saint-Germain named a 27-player final squad.

No.	Pos.	Nation	Player	Date of birth (age)
1	GK	(Italy) ITA	Gianluigi Donnarumma	February 25, 1999 (aged 26)
2	DF	(Morocco) MAR	Achraf Hakimi	November 4, 1998 (aged 26)
3	DF	(France) FRA	Presnel Kimpembe	August 13, 1995 (aged 29)
4	DF	(Brazil) BRA	Lucas Beraldo	November 24, 2003 (aged 21)
5	DF	(Brazil) BRA	Marquinhos (captain)	May 14, 1994 (aged 31)
7	FW	(Georgia (country)) GEO	Khvicha Kvaratskhelia	February 12, 2001 (aged 24)
8	MF	(Spain) ESP	Fabián Ruiz	April 3, 1996 (aged 29)
9	FW	(Portugal) POR	Gonçalo Ramos	June 20, 2001 (aged 23)
10	FW	(France) FRA	Ousmane Dembélé	May 15, 1997 (aged 28)
14	FW	(France) FRA	Désiré Doué	June 3, 2005 (aged 20)
17	MF	(Portugal) POR	Vitinha	February 13, 2000 (aged 25)
19	MF	(South Korea) KOR	Lee Kang-in	February 19, 2001 (aged 24)
20	MF	(Brazil) BRA	Gabriel Moscardo	September 28, 2005 (aged 19)
21	DF	(France) FRA	Lucas Hernandez	February 14, 1996 (aged 29)
24	MF	(France) FRA	Senny Mayulu	May 17, 2006 (aged 19)
25	DF	(Portugal) POR	Nuno Mendes	June 19, 2002 (aged 22)
29	FW	(France) FRA	Bradley Barcola	September 2, 2002 (aged 22)
33	MF	(France) FRA	Warren Zaïre-Emery	March 8, 2006 (aged 19)
39	GK	(Russia) RUS	Matvey Safonov	February 25, 1999 (aged 26)
42	DF	(France) FRA	Yoram Zague	May 15, 2006 (aged 19)
43	DF	(France) FRA	Noham Kamara	January 22, 2007 (aged 18)
45	DF	(Morocco) MAR	Naoufel El Hannach	December 7, 2006 (aged 18)
49	FW	(France) FRA	Ibrahim Mbaye	January 24, 2008 (aged 17)
50	GK	(France) FRA	Lucas Lavallée	February 18, 2003 (aged 22)
51	DF	(Ecuador) ECU	Willian Pacho	October 16, 2001 (aged 23)
80	GK	(Spain) ESP	Arnau Tenas	May 30, 2001 (aged 24)
87	MF	(Portugal) POR	João Neves	September 27, 2004 (aged 20)

=== Seattle Sounders FC ===
Manager: (United States) Brian Schmetzer

American club Seattle Sounders FC named a 26-player final squad.

No.	Pos.	Nation	Player	Date of birth (age)
3	DF	(United States) USA	Travian Sousa	September 19, 2001 (aged 23)
5	DF	(Cameroon) CMR	Nouhou Tolo	June 23, 1997 (aged 27)
6	MF	(Brazil) BRA	João Paulo	March 8, 1991 (aged 34)
7	MF	(United States) USA	Cristian Roldan	June 3, 1995 (aged 30)
9	FW	(United States) USA	Jesús Ferreira	December 24, 2000 (aged 24)
10	FW	(Argentina) ARG	Pedro de la Vega	February 7, 2001 (aged 24)
11	MF	(Slovakia) SVK	Albert Rusnák	July 7, 1994 (aged 30)
13	FW	(United States) USA	Jordan Morris	October 26, 1994 (aged 30)
14	FW	(United States) USA	Paul Rothrock	January 9, 1999 (aged 26)
15	DF	(Jamaica) JAM	Jon Bell	August 26, 1997 (aged 27)
16	DF	(El Salvador) ESA	Alex Roldán	July 28, 1996 (aged 28)
18	MF	(Mexico) MEX	Obed Vargas	August 5, 2005 (aged 19)
19	FW	(United States) USA	Danny Musovski	November 30, 1995 (aged 29)
20	DF	(South Korea) KOR	Kim Kee-hee	July 13, 1989 (aged 35)
21	MF	(United States) USA	Reed Baker-Whiting	March 31, 2005 (aged 20)
24	GK	(Switzerland) SUI	Stefan Frei (captain)	April 20, 1986 (aged 39)
25	DF	(United States) USA	Jackson Ragen	September 24, 1998 (aged 26)
26	GK	(United States) USA	Andrew Thomas	September 1, 1998 (aged 26)
28	DF	(Colombia) COL	Yeimar Gómez Andrade	June 30, 1992 (aged 32)
29	GK	(United States) USA	Jacob Castro	December 18, 1999 (aged 25)
33	DF	(United States) USA	Cody Baker	January 7, 2004 (aged 21)
75	MF	(United States) USA	Danny Leyva	May 5, 2003 (aged 22)
77	FW	(England) ENG	Ryan Kent	November 11, 1996 (aged 28)
85	DF	(United States) USA	Kalani Kossa-Rienzi	June 27, 2002 (aged 22)
93	FW	(Ivory Coast) CIV	Georgi Minoungou	July 25, 2002 (aged 22)
95	FW	(Guyana) GUY	Osaze De Rosario	July 19, 2001 (aged 23)

== Group C ==
=== Auckland City ===
Manager: (New Zealand) Paul Posa / (New Zealand) Ivan Vicelich (interim) (Note: Auckland City announced that manager Paul Posa would remain in New Zealand during the first two weeks of June due to personal reasons, with Ivan Vicelich serving as the interim manager. Posa returned as manager ahead of the club's second match of the tournament.)

New Zealand club Auckland City named a 27-player final squad. As the only amateur club in the competition, not all squad members were able to secure time off work to travel to the tournament.

No.	Pos.	Nation	Player	Date of birth (age)
1	GK	(New Zealand) NZL	Conor Tracey	April 13, 1997 (aged 28)
2	DF	(New Zealand) NZL	Mario Ilich (captain)	June 23, 1995 (aged 29)
3	DF	(New Zealand) NZL	Adam Mitchell	June 1, 1996 (aged 29)
4	DF	(New Zealand) NZL	Christian Gray	November 29, 1996 (aged 28)
5	DF	(New Zealand) NZL	Nikko Boxall	February 24, 1992 (aged 33)
6	MF	(New Zealand) NZL	Jackson Manuel	February 24, 2003 (aged 22)
7	FW	(New Zealand) NZL	Myer Bevan	April 23, 1997 (aged 28)
8	MF	(Spain) ESP	Gerard Garriga	May 28, 1993 (aged 32)
9	FW	(New Zealand) NZL	Angus Kilkolly	April 18, 1996 (aged 29)
10	FW	(New Zealand) NZL	Dylan Manickum	June 16, 1992 (aged 32)
11	FW	(New Zealand) NZL	Ryan De Vries	September 14, 1991 (aged 33)
12	DF	(Kosovo) KOS	Regont Murati	May 14, 1996 (aged 29)
13	DF	(New Zealand) NZL	Nathan Lobo	December 16, 2002 (aged 22)
14	MF	(New Zealand) NZL	Jordan Vale	January 15, 1994 (aged 31)
15	MF	(New Zealand) NZL	Jeremy Foo	March 7, 2007 (aged 18)
16	FW	(New Zealand) NZL	Joseph Lee	July 12, 2002 (aged 22)
17	FW	(Colombia) COL	Jerson Lagos	November 1, 2002 (aged 22)
18	GK	(Uruguay) URU	Sebastián Ciganda	August 30, 1993 (aged 31)
19	DF	(Republic of Ireland) IRL	Dylan Connolly	May 16, 2000 (aged 25)
20	MF	(New Zealand) NZL	Matt Ellis	February 27, 2001 (aged 24)
21	DF	(New Zealand) NZL	Adam Bell	February 12, 2004 (aged 21)
22	MF	(China) CHN	Zhou Tong	January 12, 1990 (aged 35)
23	DF	(New Zealand) NZL	Alfie Rogers	February 6, 1995 (aged 30)
24	GK	(New Zealand) NZL	Nathan Garrow	November 29, 2004 (aged 20)
25	MF	(New Zealand) NZL	Michael den Heijer	April 14, 1996 (aged 29)
26	FW	(New Zealand) NZL	David Yoo	December 7, 1999 (aged 25)
27	FW	(New Zealand) NZL	Haris Zeb	May 15, 2001 (aged 24)

=== Bayern Munich ===
Manager: (Belgium) Vincent Kompany

German club Bayern Munich named a 32-player final squad. Leroy Sané left the squad on 30 June after signing with a new club.

No.	Pos.	Nation	Player	Date of birth (age)
1	GK	(Germany) GER	Manuel Neuer (captain)	March 27, 1986 (aged 39)
2	DF	(France) FRA	Dayot Upamecano	October 27, 1998 (aged 26)
3	DF	(South Korea) KOR	Kim Min-jae	November 15, 1996 (aged 28)
4	DF	(Germany) GER	Jonathan Tah	February 11, 1996 (aged 29)
6	MF	(Germany) GER	Joshua Kimmich	February 8, 1995 (aged 30)
7	FW	(Germany) GER	Serge Gnabry	July 14, 1995 (aged 29)
8	MF	(Germany) GER	Leon Goretzka	February 6, 1995 (aged 30)
9	FW	(England) ENG	Harry Kane	July 28, 1993 (aged 31)
10	FW	(Germany) GER	Leroy Sané (until 30 June)	January 11, 1996 (aged 29)
11	FW	(France) FRA	Kingsley Coman	June 13, 1996 (aged 29)
15	DF	(England) ENG	Eric Dier	January 15, 1994 (aged 31)
16	MF	(Portugal) POR	João Palhinha	July 9, 1995 (aged 29)
17	FW	(France) FRA	Michael Olise	December 12, 2001 (aged 23)
18	GK	(Israel) ISR	Daniel Peretz	July 10, 2000 (aged 24)
20	MF	(Germany) GER	Tom Bischof	June 28, 2005 (aged 19)
22	DF	(Portugal) POR	Raphaël Guerreiro	December 22, 1993 (aged 31)
23	DF	(France) FRA	Sacha Boey	September 13, 2000 (aged 24)
24	FW	(Croatia) CRO	Gabriel Vidović	December 1, 2003 (aged 21)
25	FW	(Germany) GER	Thomas Müller	September 13, 1989 (aged 35)
27	MF	(Austria) AUT	Konrad Laimer	May 27, 1997 (aged 28)
30	DF	(Germany) GER	Cassiano Kiala	January 11, 2009 (aged 16)
35	MF	(Germany) GER	Maurice Krattenmacher	August 11, 2005 (aged 19)
36	FW	(Germany) GER	Wisdom Mike	September 24, 2008 (aged 16)
40	GK	(Germany) GER	Jonas Urbig	August 8, 2003 (aged 21)
41	FW	(Sweden) SWE	Jonah Kusi-Asare	July 4, 2007 (aged 17)
42	MF	(Germany) GER	Jamal Musiala	February 26, 2003 (aged 22)
44	DF	(Croatia) CRO	Josip Stanišić	April 2, 2000 (aged 25)
45	MF	(Germany) GER	Aleksandar Pavlović	May 3, 2004 (aged 21)
46	MF	(Germany) GER	Lennart Karl	February 22, 2008 (aged 17)
47	MF	(Portugal) POR	David Santos Daiber	January 10, 2007 (aged 18)
48	GK	(Germany) GER	Leon Klanac	March 1, 2007 (aged 18)
49	DF	(Morocco) MAR	Adam Aznou	June 2, 2006 (aged 19)

=== Benfica ===
Manager: (Portugal) Bruno Lage

Portuguese club Benfica named a 30-player final squad.

No.	Pos.	Nation	Player	Date of birth (age)
1	GK	(Ukraine) UKR	Anatoliy Trubin	August 1, 2001 (aged 23)
3	DF	(Spain) ESP	Álvaro Carreras	March 23, 2003 (aged 22)
4	DF	(Portugal) POR	António Silva	October 30, 2003 (aged 21)
8	MF	(Norway) NOR	Fredrik Aursnes	December 10, 1995 (aged 29)
10	MF	(Turkey) TUR	Orkun Kökçü	December 29, 2000 (aged 24)
11	FW	(Argentina) ARG	Ángel Di María	February 14, 1988 (aged 37)
14	FW	(Greece) GRE	Vangelis Pavlidis	November 21, 1998 (aged 26)
17	FW	(Turkey) TUR	Kerem Aktürkoğlu	October 21, 1998 (aged 26)
18	MF	(Luxembourg) LUX	Leandro Barreiro	January 3, 2000 (aged 25)
19	FW	(Italy) ITA	Andrea Belotti	December 20, 1993 (aged 31)
21	FW	(Norway) NOR	Andreas Schjelderup	June 1, 2004 (aged 21)
25	FW	(Argentina) ARG	Gianluca Prestianni	January 31, 2006 (aged 19)
26	DF	(Sweden) SWE	Samuel Dahl	March 4, 2003 (aged 22)
27	FW	(Portugal) POR	Bruma	October 24, 1994 (aged 30)
30	DF	(Argentina) ARG	Nicolás Otamendi (captain)	February 12, 1988 (aged 37)
47	FW	(Portugal) POR	Tiago Gouveia	June 18, 2001 (aged 23)
50	GK	(Portugal) POR	Diogo Ferreira	February 10, 2007 (aged 18)
58	DF	(Portugal) POR	Rui Silva	March 18, 2007 (aged 18)
61	MF	(Portugal) POR	Florentino Luís	August 19, 1999 (aged 25)
64	DF	(Portugal) POR	Gonçalo Oliveira	July 4, 2006 (aged 18)
66	DF	(United States) USA	Joshua Wynder	May 2, 2005 (aged 20)
68	MF	(Portugal) POR	João Veloso	June 26, 2005 (aged 19)
71	DF	(Portugal) POR	Leandro Santos	September 28, 2005 (aged 19)
75	GK	(Portugal) POR	André Gomes	October 20, 2004 (aged 20)
81	DF	(Albania) ALB	Adrian Bajrami	April 5, 2002 (aged 23)
83	MF	(Portugal) POR	Rafael Luís	February 18, 2005 (aged 20)
84	FW	(Portugal) POR	João Rego	June 20, 2005 (aged 19)
85	MF	(Portugal) POR	Renato Sanches	August 18, 1997 (aged 27)
86	MF	(Portugal) POR	Diogo Prioste	March 26, 2004 (aged 21)
94	FW	(Portugal) POR	Eduardo Fernandes	March 24, 2007 (aged 18)

=== Boca Juniors ===
Manager: (Argentina) Miguel Ángel Russo

Argentine club Boca Juniors named a 35-player final squad.

No.	Pos.	Nation	Player	Date of birth (age)
1	GK	(Argentina) ARG	Sergio Romero	February 22, 1987 (aged 38)
3	DF	(Uruguay) URU	Marcelo Saracchi	April 23, 1998 (aged 27)
4	DF	(Argentina) ARG	Nicolás Figal	April 3, 1994 (aged 31)
5	MF	(Argentina) ARG	Rodrigo Battaglia	July 12, 1991 (aged 33)
6	DF	(Argentina) ARG	Marcos Rojo	March 20, 1990 (aged 35)
7	FW	(Argentina) ARG	Exequiel Zeballos	April 24, 2002 (aged 23)
8	MF	(Chile) CHI	Carlos Palacios	July 20, 2000 (aged 24)
9	FW	(Argentina) ARG	Milton Giménez	August 12, 1996 (aged 28)
10	FW	(Uruguay) URU	Edinson Cavani (captain)	February 14, 1987 (aged 38)
11	FW	(Argentina) ARG	Lucas Janson	August 16, 1994 (aged 30)
12	GK	(Argentina) ARG	Leandro Brey	September 21, 2002 (aged 22)
13	GK	(Argentina) ARG	Javier García	January 29, 1987 (aged 38)
14	MF	(Argentina) ARG	Ignacio Miramón	June 12, 2003 (aged 22)
15	MF	(Chile) CHI	Williams Alarcón	November 29, 2000 (aged 24)
16	FW	(Uruguay) URU	Miguel Merentiel	February 24, 1996 (aged 29)
17	DF	(Peru) PER	Luis Advíncula	March 2, 1990 (aged 35)
18	DF	(Colombia) COL	Frank Fabra	February 22, 1991 (aged 34)
19	MF	(Argentina) ARG	Agustín Martegani	May 20, 2000 (aged 25)
20	MF	(Argentina) ARG	Alan Velasco	July 27, 2002 (aged 22)
21	MF	(Spain) ESP	Ander Herrera	August 14, 1989 (aged 35)
22	MF	(Argentina) ARG	Kevin Zenón	July 30, 2001 (aged 23)
23	DF	(Argentina) ARG	Lautaro Blanco	February 19, 1999 (aged 26)
24	DF	(Argentina) ARG	Juan Barinaga	October 10, 2000 (aged 24)
25	GK	(Argentina) ARG	Agustín Marchesín	March 16, 1988 (aged 37)
26	DF	(Argentina) ARG	Marco Pellegrino	July 18, 2002 (aged 22)
27	MF	(Argentina) ARG	Malcom Braida	May 17, 1997 (aged 28)
30	MF	(Argentina) ARG	Tomás Belmonte	May 27, 1998 (aged 27)
32	DF	(Argentina) ARG	Ayrton Costa	July 12, 1999 (aged 25)
33	FW	(Argentina) ARG	Brian Aguirre	January 6, 2003 (aged 22)
34	DF	(Argentina) ARG	Mateo Mendía	February 3, 2004 (aged 21)
38	MF	(Argentina) ARG	Camilo Rey Domenech	March 10, 2006 (aged 19)
40	DF	(Argentina) ARG	Lautaro Di Lollo	March 10, 2004 (aged 21)
42	DF	(Switzerland) SUI	Lucas Blondel	September 14, 1996 (aged 28)
43	MF	(Argentina) ARG	Milton Delgado	June 16, 2005 (aged 19)
51	MF	(Argentina) ARG	Santiago Dalmasso	June 18, 2004 (aged 20)

== Group D ==
=== Chelsea ===
Manager: (Italy) Enzo Maresca

English club Chelsea named an initial 28-player final squad. New signing João Pedro was added to the squad during the tournament's second registration period on July 2.

No.	Pos.	Nation	Player	Date of birth (age)
1	GK	(Spain) ESP	Robert Sánchez	November 18, 1997 (aged 27)
3	DF	(Spain) ESP	Marc Cucurella	July 22, 1998 (aged 26)
4	DF	(England) ENG	Tosin Adarabioyo	September 24, 1997 (aged 27)
5	DF	(France) FRA	Benoît Badiashile	March 26, 2001 (aged 24)
6	DF	(England) ENG	Levi Colwill	February 26, 2003 (aged 22)
7	FW	(Portugal) POR	Pedro Neto	March 9, 2000 (aged 25)
8	MF	(Argentina) ARG	Enzo Fernández	January 17, 2001 (aged 24)
9	FW	(England) ENG	Liam Delap	February 8, 2003 (aged 22)
10	MF	(England) ENG	Cole Palmer	May 6, 2002 (aged 23)
11	FW	(England) ENG	Noni Madueke	March 10, 2002 (aged 23)
12	GK	(Denmark) DEN	Filip Jörgensen	April 16, 2002 (aged 23)
14	MF	(Portugal) POR	Dário Essugo	March 14, 2005 (aged 20)
15	FW	(Senegal) SEN	Nicolas Jackson	June 20, 2001 (aged 23)
17	MF	(Brazil) BRA	Andrey Santos	May 3, 2004 (aged 21)
18	FW	(France) FRA	Christopher Nkunku	November 14, 1997 (aged 27)
19	DF	(France) FRA	Mamadou Sarr	August 29, 2005 (aged 19)
20	FW	(Brazil) BRA	João Pedro (from July 2)	September 26, 2001 (aged 23)
22	MF	(England) ENG	Kiernan Dewsbury-Hall	September 6, 1998 (aged 26)
23	DF	(England) ENG	Trevoh Chalobah	July 5, 1999 (aged 25)
24	DF	(England) ENG	Reece James (captain)	December 8, 1999 (aged 25)
25	MF	(Ecuador) ECU	Moisés Caicedo	November 2, 2001 (aged 23)
27	DF	(France) FRA	Malo Gusto	May 19, 2003 (aged 22)
30	DF	(Argentina) ARG	Aarón Anselmino	April 29, 2005 (aged 20)
32	FW	(England) ENG	Tyrique George	February 4, 2006 (aged 19)
34	DF	(England) ENG	Josh Acheampong	May 5, 2006 (aged 19)
38	FW	(Spain) ESP	Marc Guiu	January 4, 2006 (aged 19)
39	GK	(Belgium) BEL	Mike Penders	July 31, 2005 (aged 19)
44	GK	(United States) USA	Gabriel Slonina	May 15, 2004 (aged 21)
45	MF	(Belgium) BEL	Roméo Lavia	January 6, 2004 (aged 21)

=== Espérance de Tunis ===
Manager: (Tunisia) Maher Kanzari

Tunisian club Espérance de Tunis named a 32-player final squad.

No.	Pos.	Nation	Player	Date of birth (age)
1	GK	(Tunisia) TUN	Amenallah Memmiche	April 20, 2004 (aged 21)
2	MF	(Tunisia) TUN	Mohamed Ben Ali	February 16, 1995 (aged 30)
3	DF	(Tunisia) TUN	Koussay Smiri	July 17, 2004 (aged 20)
4	MF	(Tunisia) TUN	Wael Derbali	June 18, 2003 (aged 21)
5	DF	(Tunisia) TUN	Yassine Meriah (captain)	July 2, 1993 (aged 31)
6	DF	(Tunisia) TUN	Hamza Jelassi	September 29, 1991 (aged 33)
8	MF	(Tunisia) TUN	Houssem Tka	August 16, 2000 (aged 24)
9	FW	(Brazil) BRA	Rodrigo Rodrigues	June 18, 1996 (aged 28)
10	MF	(Brazil) BRA	Yan Sasse	June 24, 1997 (aged 27)
11	MF	(Algeria) ALG	Youcef Belaïli	March 14, 1992 (aged 33)
12	FW	(Tunisia) TUN	Haythem Dhaou	January 12, 2005 (aged 20)
13	DF	(Tunisia) TUN	Raed Bouchniba	September 25, 2003 (aged 21)
14	MF	(Nigeria) NGR	Onuche Ogbelu	May 10, 2003 (aged 22)
15	DF	(Algeria) ALG	Mohamed Amine Tougai	January 22, 2000 (aged 25)
16	GK	(Tunisia) TUN	Mokhtar Ifaoui	March 2, 2003 (aged 22)
17	MF	(Tunisia) TUN	Zakaria El Ayeb	January 15, 2003 (aged 22)
19	FW	(Tunisia) TUN	Achref Jabri	December 26, 2001 (aged 23)
20	DF	(Tunisia) TUN	Mohamed Amine Ben Hamida	December 15, 1995 (aged 29)
21	MF	(Ivory Coast) CIV	Abdramane Konaté	June 25, 2006 (aged 18)
22	DF	(Tunisia) TUN	Ayman Ben Mohamed	December 8, 1994 (aged 30)
24	FW	(South Africa) RSA	Elias Mokwana	September 8, 1999 (aged 25)
25	DF	(Sweden) SWE	Elyas Bouzaiene	September 8, 1997 (aged 27)
26	GK	(Tunisia) TUN	Mohamed Sedki Debchi	October 28, 1999 (aged 25)
28	FW	(Tunisia) TUN	Zinedine Kada	August 1, 2005 (aged 19)
30	FW	(Tunisia) TUN	Koussay Maacha	May 21, 2007 (aged 18)
32	GK	(Tunisia) TUN	Bechir Ben Saïd	November 29, 1992 (aged 32)
35	DF	(Tunisia) TUN	Aziz Koudhai	August 7, 2004 (aged 20)
36	FW	(Tunisia) TUN	Chiheb Jebali	May 26, 1996 (aged 29)
37	FW	(Belgium) BEL	Mohamed Mouhli	September 13, 1998 (aged 26)
38	MF	(Tunisia) TUN	Khalil Guenichi	December 11, 2002 (aged 22)
39	FW	(Tunisia) TUN	Rayane Hamrouni	January 29, 2003 (aged 22)
40	FW	(Mali) MLI	Aboubacar Diakité	December 31, 2006 (aged 18)

=== Flamengo ===
Manager: (Brazil) Filipe Luís

Brazilian club Flamengo named a 35-player final squad.

No.	Pos.	Nation	Player	Date of birth (age)
1	GK	(Argentina) ARG	Agustín Rossi	August 21, 1995 (aged 29)
2	DF	(Uruguay) URU	Guillermo Varela	March 24, 1993 (aged 32)
3	DF	(Brazil) BRA	Léo Ortiz	January 3, 1996 (aged 29)
4	DF	(Brazil) BRA	Léo Pereira	January 31, 1996 (aged 29)
5	MF	(Chile) CHI	Erick Pulgar	January 15, 1994 (aged 31)
6	DF	(Brazil) BRA	Ayrton Lucas	June 19, 1997 (aged 27)
7	FW	(Brazil) BRA	Luiz Araújo	June 2, 1996 (aged 29)
8	MF	(Brazil) BRA	Gerson (captain)	May 20, 1997 (aged 28)
9	FW	(Brazil) BRA	Pedro	June 20, 1997 (aged 27)
10	MF	(Uruguay) URU	Giorgian de Arrascaeta	June 1, 1994 (aged 31)
11	FW	(Brazil) BRA	Everton	March 22, 1996 (aged 29)
13	DF	(Brazil) BRA	Danilo	July 15, 1991 (aged 33)
17	DF	(Uruguay) URU	Matías Viña	November 9, 1997 (aged 27)
18	MF	(Uruguay) URU	Nicolás de la Cruz	June 1, 1997 (aged 28)
19	FW	(Brazil) BRA	Lorran	July 4, 2006 (aged 18)
20	MF	(Brazil) BRA	Matheus Gonçalves	August 18, 2005 (aged 19)
21	MF	(Italy) ITA	Jorginho	December 20, 1991 (aged 33)
23	FW	(Brazil) BRA	Juninho	November 21, 1996 (aged 28)
25	GK	(Brazil) BRA	Matheus Cunha	May 24, 2001 (aged 24)
26	DF	(Brazil) BRA	Alex Sandro	January 26, 1991 (aged 34)
27	FW	(Brazil) BRA	Bruno Henrique	December 30, 1990 (aged 34)
29	MF	(Brazil) BRA	Allan	March 3, 1997 (aged 28)
30	FW	(Brazil) BRA	Michael	March 12, 1996 (aged 29)
33	DF	(Brazil) BRA	Cleiton	April 25, 2003 (aged 22)
43	DF	(Brazil) BRA	Wesley França	September 6, 2003 (aged 21)
47	FW	(Brazil) BRA	Guilherme Gomes	February 2, 2006 (aged 19)
49	GK	(Brazil) BRA	Dyogo Alves	January 9, 2004 (aged 21)
50	FW	(Ecuador) ECU	Gonzalo Plata	November 1, 2000 (aged 24)
51	DF	(Brazil) BRA	Daniel Sales	June 23, 2006 (aged 18)
52	MF	(Brazil) BRA	Evertton Araújo	February 28, 2003 (aged 22)
56	MF	(Brazil) BRA	Pablo Lúcio	April 12, 2007 (aged 18)
58	GK	(Brazil) BRA	Léo Nannetti	August 21, 2007 (aged 17)
61	DF	(Brazil) BRA	João Victor	January 1, 2007 (aged 18)
64	FW	(Brazil) BRA	Wallace Yan	February 8, 2005 (aged 20)
79	MF	(Brazil) BRA	Joshua	May 26, 2007 (aged 18)

=== Los Angeles FC ===
Manager: (United States) Steve Cherundolo

American club Los Angeles FC named a 31-player final squad.

No.	Pos.	Nation	Player	Date of birth (age)
1	GK	(France) FRA	Hugo Lloris	December 26, 1986 (aged 38)
4	DF	(Colombia) COL	Eddie Segura	February 2, 1997 (aged 28)
5	DF	(Brazil) BRA	Marlon	September 7, 1995 (aged 29)
6	MF	(Brazil) BRA	Igor Jesus	March 7, 2003 (aged 22)
8	MF	(United States) USA	Mark Delgado	May 16, 1995 (aged 30)
9	FW	(France) FRA	Olivier Giroud	September 30, 1986 (aged 38)
11	MF	(United States) USA	Timothy Tillman	January 4, 1999 (aged 26)
12	GK	(Canada) CAN	Thomas Hasal	July 9, 1999 (aged 25)
14	DF	(Spain) ESP	Sergi Palencia	March 23, 1996 (aged 29)
15	DF	(Italy) ITA	Lorenzo Dellavalle	April 4, 2004 (aged 21)
17	FW	(United States) USA	Jeremy Ebobisse	February 14, 1997 (aged 28)
18	GK	(Mexico) MEX	David Ochoa	January 16, 2001 (aged 24)
20	MF	(Ghana) GHA	Yaw Yeboah	March 28, 1997 (aged 28)
21	DF	(Canada) CAN	Ryan Raposo	March 5, 1999 (aged 26)
23	MF	(United States) USA	Frankie Amaya	September 26, 2000 (aged 24)
24	DF	(United States) USA	Ryan Hollingshead	April 16, 1991 (aged 34)
25	DF	(Luxembourg) LUX	Maxime Chanot	November 21, 1989 (aged 35)
26	FW	(Netherlands) NED	Javairô Dilrosun	June 22, 1998 (aged 26)
27	FW	(El Salvador) ESA	Nathan Ordaz	January 12, 2004 (aged 21)
29	DF	(Ukraine) UKR	Artem Smolyakov	May 29, 2003 (aged 22)
30	FW	(Venezuela) VEN	David Martínez	February 7, 2006 (aged 19)
31	GK	(United States) USA	Cabral Carter	July 5, 2004 (aged 20)
33	DF	(United States) USA	Aaron Long (captain)	October 12, 1992 (aged 32)
43	MF	(United States) USA	Adam Saldana	February 7, 2002 (aged 23)
45	DF	(United States) USA	Kenny Nielsen	February 13, 2002 (aged 23)
56	MF	(United States) USA	Jude Terry	October 8, 2008 (aged 16)
70	MF	(Guatemala) GUA	Matt Evans	May 25, 2006 (aged 19)
77	FW	(United States) USA	Adrian Wibowo	January 17, 2006 (aged 19)
80	MF	(Norway) NOR	Odin Thiago Holm	January 18, 2003 (aged 22)
91	DF	(United States) USA	Nkosi Tafari	March 23, 1997 (aged 28)
99	FW	(Gabon) GAB	Denis Bouanga	November 11, 1994 (aged 30)

== Group E ==
=== Inter Milan ===
Manager: (Romania) Cristian Chivu

Italian club Inter Milan named a 33-player final squad.

No.	Pos.	Nation	Player	Date of birth (age)
1	GK	(Switzerland) SUI	Yann Sommer	December 17, 1988 (aged 36)
2	MF	(Netherlands) NED	Denzel Dumfries	April 18, 1996 (aged 29)
6	DF	(Netherlands) NED	Stefan de Vrij	February 5, 1992 (aged 33)
7	MF	(Poland) POL	Piotr Zieliński	May 20, 1994 (aged 31)
8	MF	(Croatia) CRO	Petar Sučić	October 25, 2003 (aged 21)
9	FW	(France) FRA	Marcus Thuram	August 6, 1997 (aged 27)
10	FW	(Argentina) ARG	Lautaro Martínez (captain)	August 22, 1997 (aged 27)
11	MF	(Brazil) BRA	Luis Henrique	December 14, 2001 (aged 23)
12	GK	(Italy) ITA	Raffaele Di Gennaro	October 3, 1993 (aged 31)
13	GK	(Spain) ESP	Josep Martínez	May 27, 1998 (aged 27)
15	DF	(Italy) ITA	Francesco Acerbi	February 10, 1988 (aged 37)
16	MF	(Italy) ITA	Davide Frattesi	September 22, 1999 (aged 25)
20	MF	(Turkey) TUR	Hakan Çalhanoğlu	February 8, 1994 (aged 31)
21	MF	(Albania) ALB	Kristjan Asllani	March 9, 2002 (aged 23)
22	MF	(Armenia) ARM	Henrikh Mkhitaryan	January 21, 1989 (aged 36)
23	MF	(Italy) ITA	Nicolò Barella	February 7, 1997 (aged 28)
28	DF	(France) FRA	Benjamin Pavard	March 28, 1996 (aged 29)
30	DF	(Brazil) BRA	Carlos Augusto	January 7, 1999 (aged 26)
31	DF	(Germany) GER	Yann Aurel Bisseck	November 29, 2000 (aged 24)
32	DF	(Italy) ITA	Federico Dimarco	November 10, 1997 (aged 27)
36	DF	(Italy) ITA	Matteo Darmian	December 2, 1989 (aged 35)
40	GK	(Italy) ITA	Alessandro Calligaris	March 7, 2005 (aged 20)
42	DF	(Argentina) ARG	Tomás Palacios	April 28, 2003 (aged 22)
45	FW	(Argentina) ARG	Valentín Carboni	March 5, 2005 (aged 20)
48	DF	(Italy) ITA	Gabriele Re Cecconi	April 25, 2006 (aged 19)
49	FW	(Italy) ITA	Giacomo De Pieri	December 29, 2006 (aged 18)
52	MF	(Italy) ITA	Thomas Berenbruch	May 31, 2005 (aged 20)
58	DF	(Italy) ITA	Matteo Cocchi	February 1, 2007 (aged 18)
59	MF	(Poland) POL	Nicola Zalewski	January 23, 2002 (aged 23)
70	FW	(Italy) ITA	Sebastiano Esposito	July 2, 2002 (aged 22)
94	FW	(Italy) ITA	Pio Esposito	June 28, 2005 (aged 19)
95	DF	(Italy) ITA	Alessandro Bastoni	April 13, 1999 (aged 26)
99	FW	(Iran) IRI	Mehdi Taremi (Note: Though named in the squad, Mehdi Taremi did not join up with the squad as he was forced to remain in Iran during the June 2025 Israeli strikes on Iran.)	July 18, 1992 (aged 32)

=== Monterrey ===
Manager: (Spain) Domènec Torrent

Mexican club Monterrey named a 30-player final squad.

No.	Pos.	Nation	Player	Date of birth (age)
1	GK	(Argentina) ARG	Esteban Andrada	January 26, 1991 (aged 34)
2	DF	(Mexico) MEX	Ricardo Chávez	November 19, 1994 (aged 30)
3	DF	(Mexico) MEX	Gerardo Arteaga	September 7, 1998 (aged 26)
4	DF	(Mexico) MEX	Víctor Guzmán	March 7, 2002 (aged 23)
5	MF	(Mexico) MEX	Fidel Ambríz	March 21, 2003 (aged 22)
6	MF	(Colombia) COL	Nelson Deossa	February 6, 2000 (aged 25)
7	FW	(Mexico) MEX	Germán Berterame	November 13, 1998 (aged 26)
8	MF	(Spain) ESP	Óliver Torres	November 10, 1994 (aged 30)
10	MF	(Spain) ESP	Sergio Canales	February 16, 1991 (aged 34)
11	FW	(Mexico) MEX	Alfonso Alvarado	March 15, 2000 (aged 25)
13	DF	(Mexico) MEX	Carlos Salcedo	September 29, 1993 (aged 31)
14	DF	(Mexico) MEX	Érick Aguirre	February 23, 1997 (aged 28)
15	DF	(Mexico) MEX	Héctor Moreno	January 17, 1988 (aged 37)
16	FW	(Colombia) COL	Johan Rojas	September 20, 2002 (aged 22)
17	MF	(Mexico) MEX	Jesús Manuel Corona	January 6, 1993 (aged 32)
19	MF	(Mexico) MEX	Jordi Cortizo	June 30, 1996 (aged 28)
20	FW	(Mexico) MEX	Alfonso González	September 5, 1994 (aged 30)
21	DF	(Mexico) MEX	Luis Reyes	April 3, 1991 (aged 34)
22	GK	(Mexico) MEX	Luis Cárdenas	September 15, 1993 (aged 31)
23	DF	(Mexico) MEX	Gustavo Sánchez	May 3, 2000 (aged 25)
25	GK	(Uruguay) URU	Santiago Mele	September 6, 1997 (aged 27)
29	MF	(Argentina) ARG	Lucas Ocampos	July 11, 1994 (aged 30)
30	MF	(Argentina) ARG	Jorge Rodríguez	September 15, 1995 (aged 29)
31	FW	(Mexico) MEX	Roberto de la Rosa	January 4, 2000 (aged 25)
32	DF	(Mexico) MEX	Tony Leone	April 28, 2004 (aged 21)
33	DF	(Colombia) COL	Stefan Medina	June 14, 1992 (aged 33)
36	FW	(Mexico) MEX	Joaquín Moxica	January 27, 2006 (aged 19)
37	MF	(Mexico) MEX	Íker Fimbres	June 2, 2005 (aged 20)
41	GK	(Mexico) MEX	Santiago Pérez	May 8, 2004 (aged 21)
93	DF	(Spain) ESP	Sergio Ramos (captain)	March 30, 1986 (aged 39)

=== River Plate ===
Manager: (Argentina) Marcelo Gallardo

Argentine club River Plate named a 34-player final squad.

No.	Pos.	Nation	Player	Date of birth (age)
1	GK	(Argentina) ARG	Franco Armani (captain)	October 16, 1986 (aged 38)
2	DF	(Argentina) ARG	Federico Gattoni	February 16, 1999 (aged 26)
4	DF	(Argentina) ARG	Gonzalo Montiel	January 1, 1997 (aged 28)
5	MF	(Argentina) ARG	Matías Kranevitter	May 21, 1993 (aged 32)
6	DF	(Argentina) ARG	Germán Pezzella	June 27, 1991 (aged 33)
7	MF	(Paraguay) PAR	Matías Rojas	November 3, 1995 (aged 29)
8	MF	(Argentina) ARG	Maximiliano Meza	December 15, 1992 (aged 32)
9	FW	(Colombia) COL	Miguel Borja	January 26, 1993 (aged 32)
10	MF	(Argentina) ARG	Manuel Lanzini	February 15, 1993 (aged 32)
11	FW	(Argentina) ARG	Facundo Colidio	January 4, 2000 (aged 25)
13	DF	(Argentina) ARG	Lautaro Rivero	November 1, 2003 (aged 21)
14	DF	(Argentina) ARG	Leandro González Pírez	February 26, 1992 (aged 33)
15	FW	(Argentina) ARG	Sebastián Driussi	February 9, 1996 (aged 29)
16	DF	(Argentina) ARG	Fabricio Bustos	April 28, 1996 (aged 29)
17	DF	(Chile) CHI	Paulo Díaz	August 25, 1994 (aged 30)
18	MF	(Argentina) ARG	Pity Martínez	June 13, 1993 (aged 32)
19	FW	(Chile) CHI	Gonzalo Tapia	February 18, 2002 (aged 23)
20	DF	(Argentina) ARG	Milton Casco	April 11, 1988 (aged 37)
21	DF	(Argentina) ARG	Marcos Acuña	October 28, 1991 (aged 33)
22	MF	(Colombia) COL	Kevin Castaño	September 29, 2000 (aged 24)
24	MF	(Argentina) ARG	Enzo Pérez	February 22, 1986 (aged 39)
25	GK	(Argentina) ARG	Conan Ledesma	February 13, 1993 (aged 32)
26	MF	(Argentina) ARG	Ignacio Fernández	January 12, 1990 (aged 35)
27	FW	(Argentina) ARG	Bautista Dadín	May 20, 2006 (aged 19)
28	DF	(Argentina) ARG	Lucas Martínez Quarta	May 10, 1996 (aged 29)
29	MF	(Argentina) ARG	Rodrigo Aliendro	February 16, 1991 (aged 34)
30	FW	(Argentina) ARG	Franco Mastantuono	August 14, 2007 (aged 17)
31	MF	(Argentina) ARG	Santiago Simón	June 13, 2002 (aged 23)
34	MF	(Argentina) ARG	Giuliano Galoppo	June 18, 1999 (aged 25)
35	MF	(Argentina) ARG	Giorgio Costantini	April 16, 2006 (aged 19)
37	GK	(Argentina) ARG	Lucas Lavagnino	August 22, 2004 (aged 20)
38	FW	(Argentina) ARG	Ian Subiabre	January 1, 2007 (aged 18)
39	MF	(Argentina) ARG	Santiago Lencina	September 4, 2005 (aged 19)
41	GK	(Argentina) ARG	Santiago Beltrán	October 4, 2004 (aged 20)

=== Urawa Red Diamonds ===
Manager: (Poland) Maciej Skorża

Japanese club Urawa Red Diamonds named a 32-player final squad.

No.	Pos.	Nation	Player	Date of birth (age)
1	GK	(Japan) JPN	Shūsaku Nishikawa	June 18, 1986 (aged 38)
3	DF	(Brazil) BRA	Danilo Boza	May 6, 1998 (aged 27)
4	DF	(Japan) JPN	Hirokazu Ishihara	February 26, 1999 (aged 26)
5	DF	(Norway) NOR	Marius Høibråten	January 23, 1995 (aged 30)
6	MF	(Japan) JPN	Taishi Matsumoto	August 22, 1998 (aged 26)
7	FW	(Japan) JPN	Hiroki Abe	January 28, 1999 (aged 26)
8	MF	(Brazil) BRA	Matheus Sávio	April 15, 1997 (aged 28)
9	MF	(Japan) JPN	Genki Haraguchi	May 9, 1991 (aged 34)
10	MF	(Japan) JPN	Shōya Nakajima	August 23, 1994 (aged 30)
11	MF	(Sweden) SWE	Samuel Gustafson	January 11, 1995 (aged 30)
12	FW	(Brazil) BRA	Thiago Santana	February 4, 1993 (aged 32)
13	MF	(Japan) JPN	Ryōma Watanabe	October 2, 1996 (aged 28)
14	MF	(Japan) JPN	Takahiro Sekine (captain)	April 19, 1995 (aged 30)
16	GK	(Japan) JPN	Ayumi Niekawa	May 12, 1994 (aged 31)
17	FW	(Japan) JPN	Hiiro Komori	August 6, 2000 (aged 24)
18	FW	(Japan) JPN	Toshiki Takahashi	January 20, 1998 (aged 27)
21	MF	(Japan) JPN	Tomoaki Ōkubo	July 23, 1998 (aged 26)
22	MF	(Japan) JPN	Kai Shibato	November 24, 1995 (aged 29)
24	MF	(Japan) JPN	Yūsuke Matsuo	July 23, 1997 (aged 27)
25	MF	(Japan) JPN	Kaito Yasui	February 9, 2000 (aged 25)
26	DF	(Japan) JPN	Takuya Ogiwara	November 23, 1999 (aged 25)
27	FW	(Japan) JPN	Toshikazu Teruuchi	November 8, 2006 (aged 18)
28	DF	(Japan) JPN	Kenta Nemoto	December 13, 2002 (aged 22)
31	GK	(Japan) JPN	Shun Yoshida	November 28, 1996 (aged 28)
35	DF	(Japan) JPN	Rikito Inoue	March 9, 1997 (aged 28)
39	MF	(Japan) JPN	Junpei Hayakawa	December 5, 2005 (aged 19)
41	FW	(Japan) JPN	Rio Nitta	April 10, 2003 (aged 22)
44	GK	(Japan) JPN	Alex Keita Malcolm	June 11, 2008 (aged 17)
45	DF	(Japan) JPN	Yoshitaka Tanaka	April 5, 2008 (aged 17)
46	MF	(Japan) JPN	Takeshi Wada	June 5, 2009 (aged 16)
77	MF	(Japan) JPN	Takurō Kaneko	July 30, 1997 (aged 27)
88	MF	(Japan) JPN	Yōichi Naganuma	April 14, 1997 (aged 28)

== Group F ==
=== Borussia Dortmund ===
Manager: (Croatia) Niko Kovač

German club Borussia Dortmund named a 30-player final squad.

No.	Pos.	Nation	Player	Date of birth (age)
1	GK	(Switzerland) SUI	Gregor Kobel	December 6, 1997 (aged 27)
2	DF	(Brazil) BRA	Yan Couto	June 3, 2002 (aged 23)
3	DF	(Germany) GER	Waldemar Anton	July 20, 1996 (aged 28)
5	DF	(Algeria) ALG	Ramy Bensebaini	April 16, 1995 (aged 30)
7	FW	(United States) USA	Giovanni Reyna	November 13, 2002 (aged 22)
8	MF	(Germany) GER	Felix Nmecha	October 10, 2000 (aged 24)
9	FW	(Guinea) GUI	Serhou Guirassy	March 12, 1996 (aged 29)
10	FW	(Germany) GER	Julian Brandt (captain)	May 2, 1996 (aged 29)
13	MF	(Germany) GER	Pascal Groß	June 15, 1991 (aged 33)
14	FW	(Germany) GER	Maximilian Beier	October 17, 2002 (aged 22)
16	FW	(Belgium) BEL	Julien Duranville	May 5, 2006 (aged 19)
17	MF	(England) ENG	Carney Chukwuemeka	October 20, 2003 (aged 21)
20	MF	(Austria) AUT	Marcel Sabitzer	March 17, 1994 (aged 31)
24	DF	(Sweden) SWE	Daniel Svensson	February 12, 2002 (aged 23)
25	DF	(Germany) GER	Niklas Süle	September 3, 1995 (aged 29)
26	DF	(Norway) NOR	Julian Ryerson	November 17, 1997 (aged 27)
27	FW	(Germany) GER	Karim Adeyemi	January 18, 2002 (aged 23)
31	GK	(Germany) GER	Silas Ostrzinski	November 19, 2003 (aged 21)
33	GK	(Germany) GER	Alexander Meyer	April 13, 1991 (aged 34)
37	FW	(United States) USA	Cole Campbell	February 20, 2006 (aged 19)
38	MF	(Germany) GER	Kjell Wätjen	February 16, 2006 (aged 19)
39	DF	(Italy) ITA	Filippo Mané	March 8, 2005 (aged 20)
40	FW	(Italy) ITA	Samuele Inacio	April 2, 2008 (aged 17)
41	FW	(United States) USA	Mathis Albert	May 21, 2009 (aged 16)
42	DF	(Germany) GER	Almugera Kabar	June 6, 2006 (aged 19)
43	FW	(England) ENG	Jamie Gittens	August 8, 2004 (aged 20)
44	DF	(France) FRA	Soumaïla Coulibaly	October 14, 2003 (aged 21)
46	MF	(Germany) GER	Ayman Azhil	April 10, 2001 (aged 24)
47	DF	(Germany) GER	Elias Benkara	April 29, 2007 (aged 18)
77	MF	(England) ENG	Jobe Bellingham	September 23, 2005 (aged 19)

=== Fluminense ===
Manager: (Brazil) Renato Gaúcho

Brazilian club Fluminense named a 32-player final squad.

No.	Pos.	Nation	Player	Date of birth (age)
1	GK	(Brazil) BRA	Fábio	September 30, 1980 (aged 44)
2	DF	(Brazil) BRA	Samuel Xavier	June 6, 1990 (aged 35)
3	DF	(Brazil) BRA	Thiago Silva (captain)	September 22, 1984 (aged 40)
4	DF	(Brazil) BRA	Ignácio	December 1, 1996 (aged 28)
5	MF	(Uruguay) URU	Facundo Bernal	August 21, 2003 (aged 21)
6	DF	(Brazil) BRA	Renê	September 14, 1992 (aged 32)
7	FW	(Venezuela) VEN	Yeferson Soteldo	June 30, 1997 (aged 27)
8	MF	(Brazil) BRA	Matheus Martinelli	October 5, 2001 (aged 23)
9	FW	(Brazil) BRA	Everaldo	July 5, 1991 (aged 33)
10	MF	(Brazil) BRA	Ganso	October 12, 1989 (aged 35)
11	FW	(Brazil) BRA	Keno	September 10, 1989 (aged 35)
12	DF	(Colombia) COL	Gabriel Fuentes	February 9, 1997 (aged 28)
14	FW	(Argentina) ARG	Germán Cano	January 2, 1988 (aged 37)
16	MF	(Brazil) BRA	Nonato	March 3, 1998 (aged 27)
17	FW	(Uruguay) URU	Agustín Canobbio	October 1, 1998 (aged 26)
18	MF	(Paraguay) PAR	Rubén Lezcano	February 9, 2004 (aged 21)
19	FW	(Uruguay) URU	Joaquín Lavega	February 3, 2005 (aged 20)
21	FW	(Colombia) COL	Jhon Arias	September 21, 1997 (aged 27)
22	DF	(Argentina) ARG	Juan Pablo Freytes	January 11, 2000 (aged 25)
23	DF	(Brazil) BRA	Guga	August 29, 1998 (aged 26)
26	DF	(Brazil) BRA	Manoel	February 26, 1990 (aged 35)
27	GK	(Brazil) BRA	Marcelo Pitaluga	December 20, 2002 (aged 22)
28	FW	(Brazil) BRA	Riquelme	March 13, 2007 (aged 18)
29	DF	(Brazil) BRA	Thiago Santos	September 5, 1989 (aged 35)
35	MF	(Brazil) BRA	Hércules	October 20, 2000 (aged 24)
37	MF	(Brazil) BRA	Isaque	February 24, 2007 (aged 18)
45	MF	(Brazil) BRA	Lima	June 11, 1996 (aged 29)
50	GK	(Brazil) BRA	Gustavo Ramalho	September 16, 2002 (aged 22)
55	MF	(Brazil) BRA	Wallace Davi	May 10, 2007 (aged 18)
77	FW	(Brazil) BRA	Paulo Baya	July 26, 1999 (aged 25)
90	FW	(Colombia) COL	Kevin Serna	December 17, 1997 (aged 27)
98	GK	(Brazil) BRA	Vitor Eudes	October 21, 1998 (aged 26)

=== Mamelodi Sundowns ===
Manager: (Portugal) Miguel Cardoso

South African club Mamelodi Sundowns named a 35-player final squad.

No.	Pos.	Nation	Player	Date of birth (age)
1	GK	(Uganda) UGA	Denis Onyango	May 15, 1985 (aged 40)
2	DF	(South Africa) RSA	Malibongwe Khoza	March 16, 2004 (aged 21)
4	MF	(South Africa) RSA	Teboho Mokoena	January 24, 1997 (aged 28)
5	DF	(South Africa) RSA	Mosa Lebusa	October 10, 1992 (aged 32)
6	MF	(South Africa) RSA	Aubrey Modiba	July 22, 1995 (aged 29)
7	MF	(Argentina) ARG	Matías Esquivel	March 22, 1999 (aged 26)
8	MF	(South Africa) RSA	Jayden Adams	May 5, 2001 (aged 24)
9	FW	(Brazil) BRA	Arthur Sales	July 3, 2002 (aged 22)
10	FW	(Brazil) BRA	Lucas Ribeiro	October 9, 1998 (aged 26)
11	MF	(Chile) CHI	Marcelo Allende	April 7, 1999 (aged 26)
12	MF	(South Africa) RSA	Neo Maema	December 1, 1995 (aged 29)
13	FW	(South Africa) RSA	Iqraam Rayners	December 19, 1995 (aged 29)
14	DF	(South Africa) RSA	Terrence Mashego	June 28, 1996 (aged 28)
15	MF	(South Africa) RSA	Bathusi Aubaas	May 14, 1995 (aged 30)
16	FW	(South Africa) RSA	Kutlwano Letlhaku	March 25, 2006 (aged 19)
17	FW	(South Africa) RSA	Tashreeq Matthews	September 12, 2000 (aged 24)
18	MF	(South Africa) RSA	Themba Zwane (captain)	August 3, 1989 (aged 35)
20	DF	(South Africa) RSA	Grant Kekana	October 31, 1992 (aged 32)
21	MF	(South Africa) RSA	Sphelele Mkhulise	February 19, 1996 (aged 29)
22	MF	(South Africa) RSA	Siyabonga Mabena	February 18, 2007 (aged 18)
24	DF	(South Africa) RSA	Keanu Cupido	January 15, 1998 (aged 27)
25	DF	(South Africa) RSA	Khuliso Mudau	April 26, 1995 (aged 30)
26	GK	(South Africa) RSA	Reyaad Pieterse	February 17, 1992 (aged 33)
27	DF	(South Africa) RSA	Thapelo Morena	August 6, 1993 (aged 31)
28	DF	(South Africa) RSA	Zuko Mdunyelwa	July 9, 1999 (aged 25)
29	DF	(Zimbabwe) ZIM	Divine Lunga	May 28, 1995 (aged 30)
30	GK	(South Africa) RSA	Ronwen Williams	January 21, 1992 (aged 33)
33	FW	(South Africa) RSA	Thapelo Maseko	November 11, 2003 (aged 21)
34	DF	(South Africa) RSA	Mothobi Mvala	June 14, 1994 (aged 31)
35	FW	(South Africa) RSA	Lebo Mothiba	January 28, 1996 (aged 29)
37	DF	(South Africa) RSA	Kegan Johannes	March 31, 2001 (aged 24)
38	FW	(Namibia) NAM	Peter Shalulile	October 23, 1993 (aged 31)
45	MF	(South Africa) RSA	Ntando Nkosi	April 30, 2004 (aged 21)
46	MF	(South Africa) RSA	Thato Sibiya	June 23, 2006 (aged 18)
50	GK	(South Africa) RSA	Sanele Tshabalala	May 12, 1998 (aged 27)

=== Ulsan HD ===
Manager: (South Korea) Kim Pan-gon

South Korean club Ulsan HD named a 29-player final squad.

No.	Pos.	Nation	Player	Date of birth (age)
3	DF	(South Korea) KOR	Kang Min-woo	March 2, 2006 (aged 19)
4	DF	(South Korea) KOR	Seo Myung-gwan	November 23, 2002 (aged 22)
5	MF	(South Korea) KOR	Jung Woo-young	December 14, 1989 (aged 35)
6	MF	(Sweden) SWE	Darijan Bojanić	December 28, 1994 (aged 30)
7	MF	(South Korea) KOR	Ko Seung-beom	April 24, 1994 (aged 31)
10	MF	(South Korea) KOR	Kim Min-woo	February 25, 1990 (aged 35)
11	MF	(South Korea) KOR	Um Won-sang	January 6, 1999 (aged 26)
13	DF	(South Korea) KOR	Kang Sang-woo	October 7, 1993 (aged 31)
14	MF	(South Korea) KOR	Lee Jin-hyun	August 26, 1997 (aged 27)
16	MF	(South Korea) KOR	Lee Hui-gyun	April 29, 1998 (aged 27)
17	MF	(Sweden) SWE	Gustav Ludwigson	October 20, 1993 (aged 31)
18	FW	(South Korea) KOR	Heo Yool	April 12, 2001 (aged 24)
19	DF	(South Korea) KOR	Kim Young-gwon (captain)	February 27, 1990 (aged 35)
21	GK	(South Korea) KOR	Jo Hyeon-woo	September 25, 1991 (aged 33)
22	MF	(South Korea) KOR	Kim Min-hyeok	August 16, 1992 (aged 32)
23	GK	(South Korea) KOR	Moon Jung-in	March 16, 1998 (aged 27)
24	DF	(South Korea) KOR	Yoon Jong-gyu	March 20, 1998 (aged 27)
26	DF	(South Korea) KOR	Park Min-seo	September 15, 2000 (aged 24)
27	MF	(South Korea) KOR	Lee Chung-yong	July 2, 1988 (aged 36)
28	DF	(South Korea) KOR	Lee Jae-ik	May 21, 1999 (aged 26)
30	MF	(South Korea) KOR	Yoon Jae-seok	October 22, 2003 (aged 21)
31	GK	(South Korea) KOR	Ryu Seong-min	January 3, 2004 (aged 21)
36	MF	(Venezuela) VEN	Matías Lacava	October 24, 2002 (aged 22)
41	MF	(South Korea) KOR	Park Sang-jun	November 19, 2003 (aged 21)
66	DF	(Poland) POL	Miłosz Trojak	May 5, 1994 (aged 31)
72	MF	(South Korea) KOR	Baek In-woo	November 29, 2006 (aged 18)
96	DF	(South Korea) KOR	Choi Seok-hyun	January 13, 2003 (aged 22)
97	MF	(Brazil) BRA	Erick Farias	January 3, 1997 (aged 28)
99	FW	(Brazil) BRA	Yago Cariello	July 27, 1999 (aged 25)

== Group G ==
=== Al Ain ===
Manager: (Serbia) Vladimir Ivić

Emirati club Al Ain named a 33-player final squad.

No.	Pos.	Nation	Player	Date of birth (age)
1	GK	(Portugal) POR	Rui Patrício	February 15, 1988 (aged 37)
3	DF	(United Arab Emirates) UAE	Kouame Autonne	September 22, 2000 (aged 24)
4	DF	(Morocco) MAR	Yahya Ben Khaleq	September 14, 2001 (aged 23)
5	MF	(South Korea) KOR	Park Yong-woo	September 10, 1993 (aged 31)
6	MF	(United Arab Emirates) UAE	Yahia Nader	September 11, 1998 (aged 26)
7	MF	(Paraguay) PAR	Matías Segovia	January 4, 2003 (aged 22)
8	MF	(United Arab Emirates) UAE	Mohammed Abbas	September 30, 2002 (aged 22)
9	FW	(Togo) TOG	Kodjo Fo-Doh Laba	January 27, 1992 (aged 33)
10	FW	(Paraguay) PAR	Kaku	January 11, 1995 (aged 30)
11	MF	(United Arab Emirates) UAE	Jonatas Santos	December 16, 2001 (aged 23)
13	FW	(Morocco) MAR	Houssine Rahimi	February 4, 2002 (aged 23)
14	DF	(Slovenia) SLO	Marcel Ratnik	December 23, 2003 (aged 21)
15	MF	(Brazil) BRA	Erik	February 18, 2001 (aged 24)
16	DF	(United Arab Emirates) UAE	Khalid Al-Hashemi	March 18, 1997 (aged 28)
17	GK	(United Arab Emirates) UAE	Khalid Eisa (captain)	September 15, 1989 (aged 35)
19	MF	(Argentina) ARG	Mateo Sanabria	March 31, 2004 (aged 21)
20	MF	(Argentina) ARG	Matías Palacios	May 10, 2002 (aged 23)
21	MF	(Morocco) MAR	Soufiane Rahimi	June 2, 1996 (aged 29)
25	DF	(Egypt) EGY	Ramy Rabia	May 20, 1993 (aged 32)
28	MF	(Morocco) MAR	Nassim Chadli	July 28, 2001 (aged 23)
29	DF	(Portugal) POR	Fábio Cardoso	April 19, 1994 (aged 31)
30	MF	(United Arab Emirates) UAE	Hazim Abbas	March 18, 2005 (aged 20)
35	GK	(Nigeria) NGR	Hassan Muhammed	July 21, 2006 (aged 18)
36	DF	(Argentina) ARG	Facundo Zabala	January 2, 1999 (aged 26)
41	GK	(Bosnia and Herzegovina) BIH	Vedad Alibašić	July 27, 2005 (aged 19)
46	DF	(Mali) MLI	Dramane Koumare	January 23, 2005 (aged 20)
56	DF	(Senegal) SEN	Amadou Niang	August 3, 2005 (aged 19)
70	MF	(Mali) MLI	Abdoul Karim Traoré	January 11, 2005 (aged 20)
72	FW	(Sudan) SDN	Mohamed Awadalla	July 16, 2002 (aged 22)
77	FW	(Nigeria) NGR	Rilwanu Sarki	February 2, 2004 (aged 21)
80	MF	(Nigeria) NGR	Joshua Udoh	July 5, 2007 (aged 17)
97	DF	(Austria) AUT	Adis Jašić	February 12, 2003 (aged 22)
99	FW	(Republic of the Congo) CGO	Josna Loulendo	January 15, 2004 (aged 21)

=== Juventus ===
Manager: (Croatia) Igor Tudor

Italian club Juventus named a 35-player final squad.

No.	Pos.	Nation	Player	Date of birth (age)
2	DF	(Portugal) POR	Alberto Costa	September 29, 2003 (aged 21)
3	DF	(Brazil) BRA	Bremer	March 18, 1997 (aged 28)
4	DF	(Italy) ITA	Federico Gatti	June 24, 1998 (aged 26)
5	MF	(Italy) ITA	Manuel Locatelli (captain)	January 8, 1998 (aged 27)
6	DF	(England) ENG	Lloyd Kelly	October 6, 1998 (aged 26)
7	FW	(Portugal) POR	Francisco Conceição	December 14, 2002 (aged 22)
8	MF	(Netherlands) NED	Teun Koopmeiners	February 28, 1998 (aged 27)
9	FW	(Serbia) SRB	Dušan Vlahović	January 28, 2000 (aged 25)
10	FW	(Turkey) TUR	Kenan Yıldız	May 4, 2005 (aged 20)
11	FW	(Argentina) ARG	Nicolás González	April 6, 1998 (aged 27)
14	FW	(Poland) POL	Arkadiusz Milik	February 28, 1994 (aged 31)
15	DF	(France) FRA	Pierre Kalulu	June 5, 2000 (aged 25)
16	MF	(United States) USA	Weston McKennie	August 28, 1998 (aged 26)
17	MF	(Montenegro) MNE	Vasilije Adžić	May 12, 2006 (aged 19)
18	MF	(Serbia) SRB	Filip Kostić	November 1, 1992 (aged 32)
19	MF	(France) FRA	Khéphren Thuram	March 26, 2001 (aged 24)
20	FW	(France) FRA	Randal Kolo Muani	December 5, 1998 (aged 26)
22	FW	(United States) USA	Timothy Weah	February 22, 2000 (aged 25)
23	GK	(Italy) ITA	Carlo Pinsoglio	March 16, 1990 (aged 35)
24	DF	(Italy) ITA	Daniele Rugani	July 29, 1994 (aged 30)
26	MF	(Brazil) BRA	Douglas Luiz	May 9, 1998 (aged 27)
27	DF	(Italy) ITA	Andrea Cambiaso	February 20, 2000 (aged 25)
29	GK	(Italy) ITA	Michele Di Gregorio	July 27, 1997 (aged 27)
36	FW	(Italy) ITA	Lorenzo Anghelè	February 26, 2005 (aged 20)
37	DF	(Italy) ITA	Nicolò Savona	March 19, 2003 (aged 22)
38	GK	(Italy) ITA	Giovanni Daffara	December 5, 2004 (aged 20)
40	DF	(Sweden) SWE	Jonas Rouhi	January 7, 2004 (aged 21)
41	DF	(Spain) ESP	Javier Gil	May 3, 2006 (aged 19)
43	MF	(Italy) ITA	Augusto Owusu	January 28, 2005 (aged 20)
48	FW	(Italy) ITA	Alessandro Pietrelli	January 5, 2003 (aged 22)
51	FW	(Belgium) BEL	Samuel Mbangula	January 16, 2004 (aged 21)
56	FW	(Italy) ITA	Nicolò Cudrig	August 7, 2002 (aged 22)
57	FW	(Italy) ITA	Tommaso Mancini	July 23, 2004 (aged 20)
58	MF	(Italy) ITA	Stefano Turco	January 24, 2005 (aged 20)
64	GK	(Italy) ITA	Giovanni Garofani	October 20, 2002 (aged 22)

=== Manchester City ===
Manager: (Spain) Pep Guardiola

English club Manchester City named a 27-player final squad.

No.	Pos.	Nation	Player	Date of birth (age)
3	DF	(Portugal) POR	Rúben Dias	May 14, 1997 (aged 28)
4	MF	(Netherlands) NED	Tijjani Reijnders	July 29, 1998 (aged 26)
5	DF	(England) ENG	John Stones	May 28, 1994 (aged 31)
6	DF	(Netherlands) NED	Nathan Aké	February 18, 1995 (aged 30)
7	FW	(Egypt) EGY	Omar Marmoush	February 7, 1999 (aged 26)
9	FW	(Norway) NOR	Erling Haaland	July 21, 2000 (aged 24)
11	MF	(Belgium) BEL	Jérémy Doku	May 27, 2002 (aged 23)
13	GK	(England) ENG	Marcus Bettinelli	May 24, 1992 (aged 33)
14	MF	(Spain) ESP	Nico González	January 3, 2002 (aged 23)
16	MF	(Spain) ESP	Rodri	June 22, 1996 (aged 28)
18	GK	(Germany) GER	Stefan Ortega	November 6, 1992 (aged 32)
19	MF	(Germany) GER	İlkay Gündoğan	October 24, 1990 (aged 34)
20	MF	(Portugal) POR	Bernardo Silva (captain)	August 10, 1994 (aged 30)
21	DF	(Algeria) ALG	Rayan Aït-Nouri	June 6, 2001 (aged 24)
22	DF	(Brazil) BRA	Vitor Reis	January 12, 2006 (aged 19)
24	DF	(Croatia) CRO	Joško Gvardiol	January 23, 2002 (aged 23)
25	DF	(Switzerland) SUI	Manuel Akanji	July 19, 1995 (aged 29)
26	MF	(Brazil) BRA	Savinho	April 10, 2004 (aged 21)
27	MF	(Portugal) POR	Matheus Nunes	August 27, 1998 (aged 26)
29	MF	(France) FRA	Rayan Cherki	August 17, 2003 (aged 21)
30	MF	(Argentina) ARG	Claudio Echeverri	January 2, 2006 (aged 19)
31	GK	(Brazil) BRA	Ederson	August 17, 1993 (aged 31)
45	DF	(Uzbekistan) UZB	Abdukodir Khusanov	February 29, 2004 (aged 21)
47	MF	(England) ENG	Phil Foden	May 28, 2000 (aged 25)
52	FW	(Norway) NOR	Oscar Bobb	July 12, 2003 (aged 21)
75	MF	(England) ENG	Nico O'Reilly	March 21, 2005 (aged 20)
82	DF	(England) ENG	Rico Lewis	November 21, 2004 (aged 20)

=== Wydad AC ===
Manager: (Morocco) Mohamed Amine Benhachem

Moroccan club Wydad AC named a 29-player final squad.

No.	Pos.	Nation	Player	Date of birth (age)
1	GK	(Morocco) MAR	Youssef El Motie	December 16, 1994 (aged 30)
2	DF	(Morocco) MAR	Mohamed Moufid	January 12, 2000 (aged 25)
4	FW	(South Africa) RSA	Thembinkosi Lorch	July 22, 1993 (aged 31)
5	MF	(Morocco) MAR	Ismail Moutaraji	February 1, 2000 (aged 25)
7	MF	(Martinique) MTQ	Mickaël Malsa	October 12, 1995 (aged 29)
8	FW	(Netherlands) NED	Mohamed Rayhi	July 1, 1994 (aged 30)
9	FW	(Ghana) GHA	Samuel Obeng	May 15, 1997 (aged 28)
10	MF	(Brazil) BRA	Arthur	February 24, 2005 (aged 20)
11	FW	(Morocco) MAR	Nordin Amrabat	March 31, 1987 (aged 38)
12	GK	(Morocco) MAR	Mehdi Benabid	January 24, 1998 (aged 27)
14	DF	(Morocco) MAR	Abdelmounaim Boutouil	January 9, 1998 (aged 27)
16	DF	(Morocco) MAR	Jamal Harkass (captain)	November 24, 1995 (aged 29)
17	FW	(Morocco) MAR	Zakaria Fathi	August 14, 1998 (aged 26)
18	DF	(Morocco) MAR	Fahd Moufi	May 5, 1996 (aged 29)
19	MF	(Morocco) MAR	El Mehdi El Moubarik	January 22, 2001 (aged 24)
21	FW	(South Africa) RSA	Cassius Mailula	June 12, 2001 (aged 24)
22	DF	(Netherlands) NED	Bart Meijers	January 10, 1997 (aged 28)
23	MF	(Morocco) MAR	Oussama Zemraoui	March 1, 2002 (aged 23)
24	DF	(Morocco) MAR	Ayoub Boucheta	December 3, 1993 (aged 31)
25	MF	(Burkina Faso) BFA	Stephane Aziz Ki	March 6, 1996 (aged 29)
26	FW	(Tanzania) TAN	Selemani Mwalimu	January 19, 2006 (aged 19)
27	MF	(Morocco) MAR	Ismael Benktib	July 4, 1998 (aged 26)
29	FW	(Morocco) MAR	Hamza Hannouri	January 22, 1998 (aged 27)
33	MF	(Brazil) BRA	Pedrinho	January 1, 2004 (aged 21)
34	MF	(Morocco) MAR	Yassine Bennani	July 17, 2008 (aged 16)
36	GK	(Morocco) MAR	Omar Aqzdaou	March 16, 2003 (aged 22)
44	MF	(Morocco) MAR	Rayane Mahtou	February 1, 2005 (aged 20)
72	DF	(Brazil) BRA	Guilherme Ferreira	December 2, 1999 (aged 25)
99	FW	(Syria) SYR	Omar Al Somah	March 23, 1989 (aged 36)

== Group H ==
=== Al-Hilal ===
Manager: (Italy) Simone Inzaghi

Saudi club Al-Hilal named an initial 35-player final squad. New loan signing Abderrazak Hamdallah was added to the squad during the tournament's second registration period on July 2.

No.	Pos.	Nation	Player	Date of birth (age)
3	DF	(Senegal) SEN	Kalidou Koulibaly	June 20, 1991 (aged 33)
4	DF	(Saudi Arabia) KSA	Khalifah Al-Dawsari	January 2, 1999 (aged 26)
5	DF	(Saudi Arabia) KSA	Ali Al-Bulaihi	November 21, 1989 (aged 35)
6	MF	(Brazil) BRA	Renan Lodi	April 8, 1998 (aged 27)
7	MF	(Saudi Arabia) KSA	Khalid Al-Ghannam	November 8, 2000 (aged 24)
8	MF	(Portugal) POR	Rúben Neves	March 13, 1997 (aged 28)
9	FW	(Serbia) SRB	Aleksandar Mitrović	September 16, 1994 (aged 30)
10	FW	(Morocco) MAR	Abderrazak Hamdallah (from July 2)	December 17, 1990 (aged 34)
11	FW	(Brazil) BRA	Marcos Leonardo	May 2, 2003 (aged 22)
12	DF	(Saudi Arabia) KSA	Yasser Al-Shahrani	May 25, 1992 (aged 33)
15	MF	(Saudi Arabia) KSA	Mohammed Al-Qahtani	July 23, 2002 (aged 22)
16	MF	(Saudi Arabia) KSA	Nasser Al-Dawsari	December 19, 1998 (aged 26)
17	GK	(Saudi Arabia) KSA	Mohammed Al-Rubaie	August 14, 1997 (aged 27)
18	MF	(Saudi Arabia) KSA	Musab Al-Juwayr	June 20, 2003 (aged 21)
20	DF	(Portugal) POR	João Cancelo	May 27, 1994 (aged 31)
22	MF	(Serbia) SRB	Sergej Milinković-Savić	February 27, 1995 (aged 30)
24	DF	(Saudi Arabia) KSA	Moteb Al-Harbi	February 20, 2000 (aged 25)
27	MF	(Brazil) BRA	Kaio César	February 15, 2004 (aged 21)
28	MF	(Saudi Arabia) KSA	Mohamed Kanno	September 22, 1994 (aged 30)
29	MF	(Saudi Arabia) KSA	Salem Al-Dawsari (captain)	August 19, 1991 (aged 33)
31	DF	(Saudi Arabia) KSA	Rayan Al-Ghamdi	January 3, 2006 (aged 19)
33	MF	(Saudi Arabia) KSA	Mohammed bin Muhaysh	March 2, 2006 (aged 19)
34	DF	(Saudi Arabia) KSA	Saleh Barnawi	February 8, 2007 (aged 18)
36	DF	(Saudi Arabia) KSA	Saud Haroun	July 19, 2005 (aged 19)
37	GK	(Morocco) MAR	Yassine Bounou	April 5, 1991 (aged 34)
38	FW	(Saudi Arabia) KSA	Turki Al-Ghumayl	February 2, 2005 (aged 20)
39	MF	(Saudi Arabia) KSA	Abdulaziz Hadhood	March 10, 2005 (aged 20)
40	GK	(Saudi Arabia) KSA	Ahmad Abu Rasen	November 2, 2003 (aged 21)
43	DF	(Saudi Arabia) KSA	Saad Al-Muthary	December 6, 2006 (aged 18)
50	GK	(Saudi Arabia) KSA	Abdulelah Al-Ghamdi	August 14, 2006 (aged 18)
77	MF	(Brazil) BRA	Malcom	February 26, 1997 (aged 28)
78	DF	(Saudi Arabia) KSA	Ali Lajami	April 24, 1996 (aged 29)
87	DF	(Saudi Arabia) KSA	Hassan Al-Tombakti	February 9, 1999 (aged 26)
88	DF	(Saudi Arabia) KSA	Hamad Al-Yami	May 17, 1999 (aged 26)
89	MF	(Saudi Arabia) KSA	Abdulellah Al-Malki	October 11, 1994 (aged 30)
99	FW	(Saudi Arabia) KSA	Abdullah Al-Hamdan	September 13, 1999 (aged 25)

=== Pachuca ===
Manager: (Mexico) Jaime Lozano

Mexican club Pachuca named a 30-player final squad.

No.	Pos.	Nation	Player	Date of birth (age)
2	DF	(Argentina) ARG	Sergio Barreto	April 20, 1999 (aged 26)
3	DF	(Mexico) MEX	Alonso Aceves	March 28, 2001 (aged 24)
4	DF	(Brazil) BRA	Eduardo Bauermann	February 13, 1996 (aged 29)
5	MF	(Mexico) MEX	Pedro Pedraza	April 30, 2000 (aged 25)
6	MF	(Uruguay) URU	Santiago Homenchenko	August 30, 2003 (aged 21)
7	FW	(Mexico) MEX	Emilio Rodríguez	April 21, 2003 (aged 22)
8	DF	(Mexico) MEX	Bryan González	April 10, 2003 (aged 22)
9	FW	(Mexico) MEX	Illian Hernández	April 12, 2000 (aged 25)
10	FW	(Brazil) BRA	John Kennedy	May 18, 2002 (aged 23)
11	FW	(Morocco) MAR	Oussama Idrissi	February 26, 1996 (aged 29)
12	FW	(Mexico) MEX	Alexéi Domínguez	January 3, 2005 (aged 20)
13	GK	(Mexico) MEX	Sebastián Jurado	September 28, 1997 (aged 27)
14	DF	(Mexico) MEX	Carlos Sánchez	April 13, 2002 (aged 23)
15	MF	(Mexico) MEX	Israel Luna	March 23, 2002 (aged 23)
16	DF	(Uruguay) URU	Federico Pereira	February 24, 2000 (aged 25)
18	MF	(Argentina) ARG	Agustín Palavecino	November 9, 1996 (aged 28)
19	MF	(Mexico) MEX	Javier Eduardo López	September 17, 1994 (aged 30)
21	DF	(Mexico) MEX	José Castillo	December 2, 2001 (aged 23)
22	DF	(Argentina) ARG	Gustavo Cabral (captain)	October 14, 1985 (aged 39)
23	FW	(Venezuela) VEN	Salomón Rondón	September 16, 1989 (aged 35)
24	DF	(Mexico) MEX	Luis Rodríguez	January 21, 1991 (aged 34)
25	GK	(Mexico) MEX	Carlos Moreno	January 29, 1998 (aged 27)
26	MF	(Mexico) MEX	Alan Bautista	June 11, 2002 (aged 23)
27	MF	(Mexico) MEX	Brian García	October 31, 1997 (aged 27)
28	MF	(Mexico) MEX	Elías Montiel	October 7, 2005 (aged 19)
29	FW	(Brazil) BRA	Kenedy	February 8, 1996 (aged 29)
30	FW	(Colombia) COL	Avilés Hurtado	April 20, 1987 (aged 38)
31	GK	(Mexico) MEX	José Eulogio	February 11, 2004 (aged 21)
32	MF	(Mexico) MEX	Víctor Guzmán	February 3, 1995 (aged 30)
35	DF	(Mexico) MEX	Jorge Berlanga	July 18, 2003 (aged 21)

=== Real Madrid ===
Manager: (Spain) Xabi Alonso

Spanish club Real Madrid named a 34-player final squad.

No.	Pos.	Nation	Player	Date of birth (age)
1	GK	(Belgium) BEL	Thibaut Courtois	May 11, 1992 (aged 33)
2	DF	(Spain) ESP	Dani Carvajal	January 11, 1992 (aged 33)
3	DF	(Brazil) BRA	Éder Militão	January 18, 1998 (aged 27)
4	DF	(Austria) AUT	David Alaba	June 24, 1992 (aged 32)
5	MF	(England) ENG	Jude Bellingham	June 29, 2003 (aged 21)
6	MF	(France) FRA	Eduardo Camavinga	November 10, 2002 (aged 22)
7	FW	(Brazil) BRA	Vinícius Júnior	July 12, 2000 (aged 24)
8	MF	(Uruguay) URU	Federico Valverde	July 22, 1998 (aged 26)
9	FW	(France) FRA	Kylian Mbappé	December 20, 1998 (aged 26)
10	MF	(Croatia) CRO	Luka Modrić (captain)	September 9, 1985 (aged 39)
11	FW	(Brazil) BRA	Rodrygo	January 9, 2001 (aged 24)
12	DF	(England) ENG	Trent Alexander-Arnold	October 7, 1998 (aged 26)
13	GK	(Ukraine) UKR	Andriy Lunin	February 11, 1999 (aged 26)
14	MF	(France) FRA	Aurélien Tchouaméni	January 27, 2000 (aged 25)
15	MF	(Turkey) TUR	Arda Güler	February 25, 2005 (aged 20)
16	FW	(Brazil) BRA	Endrick	July 21, 2006 (aged 18)
17	DF	(Spain) ESP	Lucas Vázquez	July 1, 1991 (aged 33)
19	MF	(Spain) ESP	Dani Ceballos	August 7, 1996 (aged 28)
20	DF	(Spain) ESP	Fran García	August 14, 1999 (aged 25)
21	FW	(Morocco) MAR	Brahim Díaz	August 3, 1999 (aged 25)
22	DF	(Germany) GER	Antonio Rüdiger	March 3, 1993 (aged 32)
23	DF	(France) FRA	Ferland Mendy	June 8, 1995 (aged 30)
24	DF	(Spain) ESP	Dean Huijsen	April 14, 2005 (aged 20)
26	GK	(Spain) ESP	Fran González	June 24, 2005 (aged 19)
29	DF	(Morocco) MAR	Yusi	October 7, 2005 (aged 19)
30	FW	(Spain) ESP	Gonzalo García	March 24, 2004 (aged 21)
31	DF	(Spain) ESP	Jacobo Ramón	January 6, 2005 (aged 20)
34	GK	(Spain) ESP	Sergio Mestre	February 13, 2005 (aged 20)
35	DF	(Spain) ESP	Raúl Asencio	February 13, 2003 (aged 22)
36	MF	(Spain) ESP	Chema Andrés	April 25, 2005 (aged 20)
41	DF	(Spain) ESP	Jesús Fortea	March 26, 2007 (aged 18)
43	DF	(Spain) ESP	Diego Aguado	February 7, 2007 (aged 18)
44	MF	(Spain) ESP	Víctor Muñoz	July 13, 2003 (aged 21)
50	MF	(Spain) ESP	Mario Martín	March 5, 2004 (aged 21)

=== Red Bull Salzburg ===
Manager: (Germany) Thomas Letsch

Austrian club Red Bull Salzburg named a 28-player final squad.

No.	Pos.	Nation	Player	Date of birth (age)
1	GK	(Austria) AUT	Alexander Schlager	February 1, 1996 (aged 29)
2	DF	(Denmark) DEN	Jacob Rasmussen	May 28, 1997 (aged 28)
5	MF	(Mali) MLI	Soumaila Diabate	November 22, 2004 (aged 20)
6	DF	(Austria) AUT	Samson Baidoo	March 31, 2004 (aged 21)
8	FW	(Japan) JPN	Sōta Kitano	August 13, 2004 (aged 20)
9	FW	(Austria) AUT	Karim Onisiwo	March 17, 1992 (aged 33)
11	FW	(Belgium) BEL	Yorbe Vertessen	January 8, 2001 (aged 24)
13	DF	(Germany) GER	Frans Krätzig	January 14, 2003 (aged 22)
14	MF	(Denmark) DEN	Maurits Kjærgaard	June 26, 2003 (aged 21)
15	MF	(Mali) MLI	Mamady Diambou	November 11, 2002 (aged 22)
16	MF	(Japan) JPN	Takumu Kawamura	August 28, 1999 (aged 25)
18	MF	(Denmark) DEN	Mads Bidstrup (captain)	February 25, 2001 (aged 24)
20	FW	(Ghana) GHA	Edmund Baidoo	January 30, 2006 (aged 19)
21	FW	(Serbia) SRB	Petar Ratkov	August 18, 2003 (aged 21)
22	DF	(Austria) AUT	Stefan Lainer	August 27, 1992 (aged 32)
23	DF	(France) FRA	Joane Gadou	January 17, 2007 (aged 18)
28	FW	(Denmark) DEN	Adam Daghim	September 28, 2005 (aged 19)
30	MF	(Israel) ISR	Oscar Gloukh	April 1, 2004 (aged 21)
36	DF	(Sweden) SWE	John Mellberg	July 30, 2006 (aged 18)
37	DF	(Austria) AUT	Tim Trummer	November 10, 2005 (aged 19)
38	MF	(Austria) AUT	Valentin Sulzbacher	March 11, 2005 (aged 20)
41	GK	(Germany) GER	Jonas Krumrey	November 25, 2003 (aged 21)
43	FW	(Switzerland) SUI	Enrique Aguilar	January 27, 2007 (aged 18)
44	DF	(Austria) AUT	Jannik Schuster	May 16, 2006 (aged 19)
45	FW	(Mali) MLI	Dorgeles Nene	December 23, 2002 (aged 22)
49	FW	(Mali) MLI	Moussa Yeo	June 1, 2004 (aged 21)
52	GK	(Austria) AUT	Christian Zawieschitzky	May 2, 2007 (aged 18)
92	GK	(Austria) AUT	Salko Hamzić	September 17, 2006 (aged 18)

== Statistics ==
=== Player representation by nation ===
Players	Nation
142	Brazil
103	Argentina
54	Spain
50	Portugal
41	Mexico
39	United States
36	France; Italy
35	Germany
32	Morocco
31	South Africa
29	Japan
27	South Korea
25	England; Saudi Arabia
24	Uruguay
23	Egypt; Tunisia
21	New Zealand
15	Colombia
13	Austria

Nations with fewer than 10 players
Players	Nation
9	Belgium; Sweden
8	Mali; Netherlands; Norway; United Arab Emirates
6	Chile; Croatia; Paraguay; Switzerland; Turkey; Venezuela
5	Denmark; Ecuador; Nigeria; Serbia
4	Algeria; Poland
3	Canada; Ghana; Greece; Senegal; Slovenia; Ukraine
2	Albania; Angola; Cameroon; Ivory Coast; El Salvador; Israel; Luxembourg
1	Armenia; Bosnia and Herzegovina; Burkina Faso; China; Congo; Dominican Republic; Gabon; Georgia; Guatemala; Guinea; Guyana; Haiti; Honduras; Iran; Jamaica; Kosovo; Martinique; Montenegro; Mozambique; Namibia; Palestine; Peru; Republic of Ireland; Russia; Slovakia; Syria; Tanzania; Togo; Uganda; Uzbekistan; Zimbabwe

=== Coaches representation by country ===
No.	Country	Coaches
5	Argentina	Javier Mascherano (Inter Miami CF), Martín Anselmi (Porto), Diego Simeone (Atlético Madrid), Miguel Ángel Russo (Boca Juniors), Marcelo Gallardo (River Plate)
5	Spain	José Riveiro (Al Ahly), Luis Enrique (Paris Saint-Germain), Domènec Torrent (Monterrey), Pep Guardiola (Manchester City), Xabi Alonso (Real Madrid)
4	Portugal	Abel Ferreira (Palmeiras), Renato Paiva (Botafogo), Bruno Lage (Benfica), Miguel Cardoso (Mamelodi Sundowns)
2	Brazil	Filipe Luís (Flamengo), Renato Gaúcho (Fluminense)
2	Croatia	Niko Kovač (Borussia Dortmund), Igor Tudor (Juventus)
2	Italy	Enzo Maresca (Chelsea), Simone Inzaghi (Al Hilal)
2	United States	Brian Schmetzer (Seattle Sounders FC), Steve Cherundolo (Los Angeles FC)
1	Belgium	Vincent Kompany (Bayern Munich)
1	Germany	Thomas Letsch (Red Bull Salzburg)
1	Mexico	Jaime Lozano (Pachuca)
1	Morocco	Mohamed Amine Benhachem (Wydad AC)
1	New Zealand	Paul Posa / Ivan Vicelich (Auckland City)
1	Poland	Maciej Skorża (Urawa Red Diamonds)
1	Romania	Cristian Chivu (Inter Milan)
1	Serbia	Vladimir Ivić (Al Ain)
1	South Korea	Kim Pan-gon (Ulsan HD)
1	Tunisia	Maher Kanzari (Espérance de Tunis)

=== Average age of squads ===
Club	Avg. age	Oldest player	Youngest player
(Brazil) Palmeiras	25.8	(Brazil) Marcelo Lomba (38 years, 178 days)	(Brazil) Estêvão (18 years, 51 days)
(Portugal) Porto	23.4	(Spain) Iván Marcano (37 years, 356 days)	(Portugal) Rodrigo Mora (18 years, 40 days)
(Egypt) Al Ahly	27.3	(Egypt) Mohamed El Shenawy (36 years, 178 days)	(Egypt) Karim El Debes (22 years, 11 days)
(United States) Inter Miami CF	26	(Argentina) Oscar Ustari (38 years, 346 days)	(United States) Santiago Morales (18 years, 125 days)
(France) Paris Saint-Germain	23.1	(Brazil) Marquinhos (31 years, 31 days)	(France) Ibrahim Mbaye (17 years, 141 days)
(Spain) Atlético Madrid	26.2	(Belgium) Axel Witsel (36 years, 153 days)	(Spain) Taufik Seidu (17 years, 145 days)
(Brazil) Botafogo	25.9	(Brazil) Marçal (36 years, 115 days)	(Argentina) Álvaro Montoro (18 years, 58 days)
(United States) Seattle Sounders FC	26.6	(Switzerland) Stefan Frei (39 years, 55 days)	(Mexico) Obed Vargas (19 years, 313 days)
(Germany) Bayern Munich	24.8	(Germany) Manuel Neuer (39 years, 79 days)	(Germany) Cassiano Kiala (16 years, 154 days)
(New Zealand) Auckland City	27.1	(China) Zhou Tong (35 years, 153 days)	(New Zealand) Jeremy Foo (18 years, 99 days)
(Argentina) Boca Juniors	27.3	(Argentina) Javier García (38 years, 136 days)	(Argentina) Camilo Rey Domenech (19 years, 96 days)
(Portugal) Benfica	23.4	(Argentina) Nicolás Otamendi (37 years, 122 days)	(Portugal) Eduardo Fernandes (18 years, 82 days)
(Brazil) Flamengo	25.5	(Brazil) Bruno Henrique (34 years, 166 days)	(Brazil) Léo Nannetti (17 years, 297 days)
(Tunisia) Espérance de Tunis	24.5	(Tunisia) Hamza Jelassi (33 years, 258 days)	(Tunisia) Koussay Maacha (18 years, 24 days)
(England) Chelsea	22.7	(England) Tosin Adarabioyo (27 years, 263 days)	(England) Josh Acheampong (19 years, 40 days)
(United States) Los Angeles FC	26	(France) Olivier Giroud (38 years, 257 days)	(United States) Jude Terry (16 years, 249 days)
(Argentina) River Plate	27.9	(Argentina) Enzo Pérez (39 years, 112 days)	(Argentina) Franco Mastantuono (17 years, 304 days)
(Japan) Urawa Red Diamonds	26.3	(Japan) Shūsaku Nishikawa (38 years, 361 days)	(Japan) Takeshi Wada (16 years, 9 days)
(Mexico) Monterrey	27.9	(Spain) Sergio Ramos (39 years, 76 days)	(Mexico) Joaquín Moxica (19 years, 138 days)
(Italy) Inter Milan	26.2	(Italy) Francesco Acerbi (37 years, 124 days)	(Italy) Matteo Cocchi (18 years, 133 days)
(Brazil) Fluminense	27.8	(Brazil) Fábio (44 years, 257 days)	(Brazil) Wallace Davi (18 years, 35 days)
(Germany) Borussia Dortmund	23.6	(Germany) Alexander Meyer (34 years, 62 days)	(United States) Mathis Albert (16 years, 24 days)
(South Korea) Ulsan HD	27.1	(South Korea) Lee Chung-yong (36 years, 347 days)	(South Korea) Baek In-woo (18 years, 197 days)
(South Africa) Mamelodi Sundowns	27.4	(Uganda) Denis Onyango (40 years, 30 days)	(South Africa) Siyabonga Mabena (18 years, 116 days)
(England) Manchester City	25.5	(Germany) İlkay Gündoğan (34 years, 233 days)	(Brazil) Vitor Reis (19 years, 153 days)
(Morocco) Wydad AC	26.4	(Morocco) Nordin Amrabat (38 years, 75 days)	(Morocco) Yassine Bennani (16 years, 332 days)
(United Arab Emirates) Al Ain	24.4	(Portugal) Rui Patrício (37 years, 119 days)	(Nigeria) Joshua Udoh (17 years, 344 days)
(Italy) Juventus	24.3	(Italy) Carlo Pinsoglio (35 years, 90 days)	(Montenegro) Vasilije Adžić (19 years, 33 days)
(Spain) Real Madrid	24.5	(Croatia) Luka Modrić (39 years, 278 days)	(Spain) Jesús Fortea (18 years, 80 days)
(Saudi Arabia) Al Hilal	25.8	(Saudi Arabia) Ali Al-Bulaihi (35 years, 205 days)	(Saudi Arabia) Saleh Barnawi (18 years, 126 days)
(Mexico) Pachuca	26.3	(Argentina) Gustavo Cabral (39 years, 243 days)	(Mexico) Elías Montiel (19 years, 250 days)
(Austria) Red Bull Salzburg	21.9	(Austria) Karim Onisiwo (33 years, 89 days)	(Austria) Christian Zawieschitzky (18 years, 43 days)
