= Malibongwe Khoza =

South African soccer player

Personal information
- Full name: Malibongwe Prince Khoza
- Date of birth: 16 March 2004 (age 22)
- Place of birth: Mamelodi, Gauteng, South Africa
- Height: 1.91 m (6 ft 3 in)
- Position: Defender

Team information
- Current team: Mamelodi Sundowns
- Number: 42

Youth career
- 2016–2024: Mamelodi Sundowns Academy

Senior career*
Years	Team	Apps	(Gls)
2024–	Mamelodi Sundowns		

International career
2024	South Africa A		
2025–	South Africa		
- * Club domestic league appearances and goals

Malibongwe Prince Khoza (born 16 March 2004) is a South African professional footballer who plays as a centre‑back and defensive midfielder for Mamelodi Sundowns and the South Africa national team.

== Early career ==
Khoza was born in Mamelodi, Gauteng and developed through local football structures before being identified by Mamelodi Sundowns’ youth system at the age of 12 years-old. His physical profile, standing at 191 cm, and comfort on the ball made him a standout prospect from an early age. Khoza played for the Sundowns DDC team in the PSL Reserve League before making his senior debut.

== Club career ==
Khoza was promoted to the Sundowns senior team in August 2024 signning a 5-year contract and quickly established himself as a reliable option in defence.

His breakout came during the 2024/25 season, where he became a regular starter and contributed to Sundowns’ league campaign and CAF Champions League fixtures. His ability to play both as a centre‑back and holding midfielder has been highlighted by coaches, including Miguel Cardoso, who praised his maturity and consistency.

Khoza won his first premiership man of the match against Siwelele in a 3–0 win on 9 September 2026.

== International career ==
Khoza's versatility earned him a place in the South Africa squad for the 2024 African Nations Championship (CHAN), where he was deployed in midfield and delivered a man of the match performance in a 1-all draw against Algeria.

He received his first senior call‑up during the 2026 FIFA World Cup qualifiers, marking a significant milestone in his international career. He made his debut against Zimbabwe on 10 October 2025 at the Moses Mabhida Stadium in Durban.

== Honours ==
Mamelodi Sundowns

- South African Premier Division: 2024–25
- MTN 8: 2026
- CAF Champions League: 2025–26
- FIFA African–Asian–Pacific Cup: 2026
