= Gomolemo =

Gomolemo is a unisex given name of Sotho-Tswana origin meaning blessings. Notable people with the name include:

- Gomolemo Kekana (born 2006), South African soccer player
- Gomolemo Motswaledi (1970–2014), Motswana politician
