= Mamelodi Sundowns Academy =

- Full name: Mamelodi Sundowns Academy
- Founded: 2011; 15 years ago
- Owner: Patrice Motsepe
- Chairman: Tlhopie Motsepe
- Head of Academy: (Brazil) Paulo Cardoso
- League: PSL Reserve League; Gauteng Development League
- 1st
- Website: sundownsfc.co.za
Home colours	Away colours

Active departments of Mamelodi Sundowns
- Football (Men's): Football B (Men's)
- Football (Women's): Football B (Women's)

Mamelodi Sundowns Academy is a South African football reserve team based in Mamelodi, Pretoria in the Gauteng province. The U/23 team plays in the PSL Reserve League and the junior teams in the Gauteng Development Leagues.

It is the academy of Mamelodi Sundowns. In 2016 the U17 team won the Gothia Cup.

Paulo Cardoso is the Head of Academy.

== Diski Challenge team ==
They won their maiden PSL Reserves title during the 2016/17 season. As the MultiChoice Diski Challenge (MDC) champions, they won a trip to the Netherlands.

In the 2023-24 season they finished as runners-up with 66 points to Stellenbosch's 67 points.

== Academy ==
In 2016 they won the Gothia Cup defeating English side Kinetic Academy 2–0 in the final. The team scored 20 goals and only conceded 4 in the tournament. In they same year, they finished as runner's up in the J-League U/17 Cup after losing 1–0 to Mtsumoto.

=== Engen Knockout Challenge ===
In 2023 they won the Engen Knockout Challenge defeating TS Galaxy 5-4 via penalties after a goalless draw.

In July 2024 they lost their Engen Knockout Challenge title to Kaizer Chiefs after a 2-0 loss in the final played at Wits Marks Park.

=== Gauteng Development League ===
In 2024 the U/15 won the top 8 cup while the U/13 and U/19s were runners-ups. In 2024 the under 15 and 17 won the Gauteng Development League. The under 13 and 19 teams were runners up in the league.

In 2025 the U/15 team defended their Top 8 cup and under 13, 15, 17, and 19 won league titles. The under 14 team were runners-ups in the league.

in 2026 the U/13 and U/15 won the top 8.

== Honours ==
U/20

- PSL Reserve League: 2016/17; Runners-up: 2023/24
- Gothia Cup: 2016
- J-League U/17 Cup: Runners-Up: 2016
- Diski Challenge Shield: Runners-up: 2018, 2019
- Engen Knockout Challenge: 2023; Runners-Up: 2024

U/17

- Gauteng Development League: 2024, 2025; Runners-up: 2021

U/15

- Gauteng Development League: 2020, 2024, 2025; Runners-up: 2021, 2022, 2023
- GDL Top 8: 2024, 2025, 2026

U/13

- Gauteng Development League: 2026; Runners-up: 2024
- GDL Top 8: 2026

== Notable players ==
Players from the academy that went on to play for Bafana Bafana:

- Percy Tau
- Keagan Dolly
- Motjeka Madisha
- Themba Zwane
- Thabo Moloisane

=== FIFA U-17 World Cup ===
List of players that were called up for a FIFA U-17 World Cup while playing for the academy. In brackets, the tournament played:

- Walter Kubheka (2015)
- Thendo Mukumela (2015)
- Notha Ngcobo (2015)
- Liam Marithinus (2025)
- Kamohelo Maraletse (2025)
- Lebogang Mswane (2025)
- Omphemetse Sekgoto (2025)
- Selwyn Stevens (2025)

=== FIFA U-20 World Cup ===
List of players that were called up for a FIFA U-20 World Cup while playing for the academy. In brackets, the tournament played:

- Keletso Makgalwa (2017)
- Thendo Mukumela (2017)
- Khulekani Kubheka (2017)
- Malebogo Modise (2017) and (2019)
- Glen Baadjies (2019)
- Promise Mkhuma (2019)
- Siphesihle Mkhize (2019)
- Brendon Moloisane (2019)
- Gomolemo Kekana (2025)
- Kutlwano Letlhaku (2025)
- Siyabonga Mabena (2025)
- Thato Sibiya (2025)
- Asekho Tiwani (2025)

== See also ==
- Mamelodi Sundowns F.C.
