= Gomolemo Kekana =

South African soccer player (born 2006)

Personal information
- Full name: Gomolemo Leviy Kekana
- Date of birth: 7 July 2006 (age 20)
- Place of birth: Zebediela, South Africa
- Position: Midfielder

Team information
- Current team: Mamelodi Sundowns Academy
- Number: 24

Youth career
- –: Alex Royal Tigers
- –: Wanderers Warriors
- –2023: TS Galaxy Academy
- 2024–: Mamelodi Sundowns Academy

International career
Years	Team	Apps	(Gls)
–2023	South Africa U17		
2024–	South Africa U20	7	(1)

Gomolemo Leviy Kekana (born 7 July 2006) is a South African soccer player who plays as a midfielder for PSL Reserve League side Mamelodi Sundowns Academy.

== Youth career ==
=== TS Galaxy Academy ===
Kekana helped the academy to a runners-up position at the 2023 Gauteng ENGEN Knockout Challenge as the side went down 5–4 via penalties to the Mamelodi Sundowns Academy after a goalless draw. He was voted the midfielder of the tournament as well as player of the tournament.

=== Mamelodi Sundowns Academy ===
Kekana joined Mamelodi Sundowns Academy in 2024 and played in the PSL Reserve. He was nominated for the player of the season award at the end of the 2024/25 season. He was part of the team that were runners-up at the 2024 Gauteng ENGEN Knockout Challenge where he was named midfielder of the tournament for a second consecutive tournament.

== Youth international career ==
Kekana competed with the South Africa U-17 at the 2023 U-17 Africa Cup of Nations and the South Africa U-20 team at the 2024 COSAFA U-20 Cup when the side won their ninth title. He scored the winning goal to help the side win their maiden U-20 Africa Cup of Nations against Morocco in 2025. He was voted the man of the match in a 2–1 win against the United States at the 2025 FIFA U-20 World Cup after scoring the equaliser in a come from behind win.

== Honours ==
South Africa U-20

- U-20 Africa Cup of Nations: 2025
- COSAFA U-20 Cup: 2024

TS Galaxy Academy

- Gauteng ENGEN Knockout Challenge: Runners-Up: 2023

Mamelodi Sundowns Academy

- Gauteng ENGEN Knockout Challenge: Runners-Up: 2024
- PSL Reserve League Third: 2024/25

Individual

- 2023 Gauteng ENGEN Knockout Challenge: Player of the Tournament
- 2023 Gauteng ENGEN Knockout Challenge: Midfielder of the Tournament
- 2024 Gauteng ENGEN Knockout Challenge: Midfielder of the Tournament
