= Kutlwano Letlhaku =

South African soccer player

Personal information
- Date of birth: 25 March 2006 (age 20)
- Place of birth: South Africa
- Height: 1.73 m (5 ft 8 in)
- Position: Winger

Team information
- Current team: Mamelodi Sundowns
- Number: 16

Youth career
- –2023: Transnet School of Excellence
- 2023–2024: Mamelodi Sundowns Academy

Senior career*
Years	Team	Apps	(Gls)
2024–	Mamelodi Sundowns	16	(3)

International career
2024–	South Africa U20	8	(1)
2026–	South Africa U23	2	(0)
- * Club domestic league appearances and goals as of 3 January 2026

Kutlwano Letlhaku (born 25 March 2006) is a South African soccer player who plays as a winger for Premier Soccer League side Mamelodi Sundowns.

== Club career ==
He started his career at the Transnet School of Excellence before joing the Mamelodi Sundowns Academy playing in the PSL Reserve.

Mamelodi Sundowns

He made his professional debut on 17 March 2024 against Maritzburg United in a Nedbank Cup match eight days before his 18th birthday.

He made his Club World Cup debut against Borussia Dortmund and provided the assist for the third goal in a 4–3 loss He played both legs of the 2025–26 CAF Champions League final where his side won their second continental title and first since 2016.

== International career ==
Letlhaku was part of the South Africa U-20 team that won the 2024 COSAFA U-20 Cup and the 2025 U-20 Africa Cup of Nations. He played in three matches at the 2025 FIFA U-20 World Cup.

== Honours ==
Mamelodi Sundowns

- South African Premiership: 2024–25
- MTN 8: 2026
- CAF Champions League: 2025–26
- FIFA African–Asian–Pacific Cup: 2026

South Africa U-20

- COSAFA U-20 Youth Championship: 2024
- U-20 Africa Cup of Nations: 2025
