= Khulekani Kubheka =

South African soccer player (born 1999)

Personal information
- Full name: Khulekani Walter Kubheka
- Date of birth: 7 January 1999 (age 27)
- Place of birth: Germiston, Gauteng, South Africa
- Height: 1.90 m (6 ft 3 in)
- Position: Goalkeeper

Youth career
- Mamelodi Sundowns

Senior career*
Years	Team	Apps	(Gls)
2018–2019	Mamelodi Sundowns	0	(0)
2018–2019	→ Cape Umoya United (loan)	1	(0)
- M Tigers

International career
2014–2015	South Africa U17		
2017–2019	South Africa U20		
- South Africa U23
- * Club domestic league appearances and goals

Khulekani Walter Kubheka (born 7 January 1999) is a South African former soccer player who played as a goalkeeper.

== Early life ==
Born in Germiston in the Gauteng province of South Africa, Kubheka was educated at Clapham High School in Pretoria, before going on to study Transport and Logistics Management at the University of South Africa.

== Club career ==
After going to watch his elder brother play in a match at the age of ten, Kubheka was asked to play in goal, as the team's main goalkeeper had failed to arrive. Naturally a centre-back, he switched between both positions until the age of fourteen, when he settled as a goalkeeper in the academy of Mamelodi Sundowns.

Having signed a contract extension in mid-2018, Kubheka joined National First Division club Cape Umoya United on loan in September 2018. His one appearance for Cape Umoya United would be the only game he would play professionally, before dropping down to Mamelodi Sundowns feeder team M Tigers.

== International career ==
Kubheka was called up to the South Africa under-20 side for the 2017 edition of the COSAFA U-20 Challenge Cup. Despite being suspended for the semi-final and final match, South Africa went on to win the tournament. Amajita would retain their title at the 2018 COSAFA U-20 Cup, with Kubheka saving two penalties in the 4–3 penalty shoot-out win against Zimbabwe.

He later received a call-up to the under-20 squad for the 2019 U-20 Africa Cup of Nations, where he captained the side to a third-place finish. At the 2019 FIFA U-20 World Cup, Kubheka was lauded for his performances, with coach Thabo Senong calling him the "pillar of our team", and that he had "played a massive role to get us into the World Cup." Despite a good performance in South Africa's 1–1 draw with Portugal, this was the only point they would earn, finishing bottom of their group.

== Career statistics ==
=== Club ===
Appearances and goals by club, season and competition
Club	Season	League			National Cup		League Cup		Continental		Other		Total	
Club	Season	Division	Apps	Goals	Apps	Goals	Apps	Goals	Apps	Goals	Apps	Goals	Apps	Goals
Mamelodi Sundowns	2018–19	ABSA Premiership	0	0	0	0	0	0	0	0	0	0	0	0
Cape Umoya United (loan)	2018–19	National First Division	1	0	0	0	0	0	–		0	0	1	0
Total			1	0	0	0	0	0	0	0	0	0	1	0
