= Riquelme Felipe =

Brazilian footballer (born 2007)

Personal information
- Full name: Riquelme Felipe Silva de Almeida
- Date of birth: 13 March 2007 (age 19)
- Place of birth: Araçatuba, Brazil
- Position: Right winger

Team information
- Current team: Fluminense
- Number: 28

Youth career
- 2017–: Fluminense

Senior career*
Years	Team	Apps	(Gls)
2025–	Fluminense	19	(0)
- * Club domestic league appearances and goals as of 13 December 2025

Riquelme Felipe Silva de Almeida (born 13 March 2007), known as Riquelme Felipe, is a Brazilian footballer who plays as a right winger for Série A club Fluminense.

== Club career ==
Born in Araçatuba in the Brazilian state of São Paulo, Riquelme joined the academy of professional club Fluminense at the age of ten. He signed his first professional contract with the club in April 2023, notably signing the deal alongside club president Mário Bittencourt at the club's headquarters in Laranjeiras, a rarity for youth players.

He made his unofficial debut for the club in a pre-season friendly against Boavista, scoring once in a 2–0 win. After helping Fluminense to win the Copa do Brasil Sub-17, scoring in the final against São Paulo, he was promoted to the under-20 team alongside teammates Isaque and Matheus Reis. On 15 October 2024, he was named by English newspaper The Guardian as one of the best players born in 2007 worldwide.

On 1 December 2024, Riquelme Felipe was first included in a competitive matchday squad, remaining unused in a 1–1 draw away to Athletico Paranaense in the Campeonato Brasileiro Série A. He made his debut on 12 January 2025 on the first day of the Campeonato Carioca season, starting in a goalless draw at home to Sampaio Corrêa.
