= Kegan Johannes =

South African soccer player (born 2001)

Personal information
- Date of birth: 31 March 2001 (age 25)
- Place of birth: Cape Town, South Africa
- Height: 1.80 m (5 ft 11 in)
- Position: Defender

Team information
- Current team: Mamelodi Sundowns
- Number: 37

Youth career
- Ajax Cape Town

Senior career*
| Years | Team | Apps | (Gls) |
| 2019–2021 | Cape Town Spurs | 62 | (4) |
| 2021–2024 | SuperSport United | 58 | (4) |
| 2024– | Mamelodi Sundowns | 5 | (0) |

International career^{‡}
| 2019 | South Africa U23 | 3 | (0) |
| 2022– | South Africa | 6 | (0) |
- * Club domestic league appearances and goals as of 3 January 2026 ‡ National team caps and goals as of 18 August 2025

Kegan Johannes (born 31 March 2001) is a South African soccer player who plays as a defender for Mamelodi Sundowns in the Premier Soccer League.

He hails from Bishop Lavis. He played youth soccer for Ajax Cape Town, which was rebranded Cape Town Spurs. He made his debut in 2019 and signed for the first team in March 2019. He represented South Africa U23 in their successful qualification for the 2020 Olympic Games.

Johannes joined SuperSport United in the summer of 2021, and during the forthcoming season he was "fast emerging as one of the best defenders" of the league, according to IOL.

Johannes was called up to Bafana Bafana for the 2022 COSAFA Cup. Here, South Africa lost to Mozambique on penalty shootouts. In a consolation tournament known as the Plate, Johannes captained the team to win the plate final against Botswana. Subsequently, SuperSport United refused to let Johannes or any other of their players join the South African team for the 2022 African Nations Championship qualification against Comoros, citing that the 2022-23 South African Premier Division start was too close.

In 2024, Johannes signed for South Africa's biggest club Mamelodi Sundowns.

== Honours ==
Mamelodi Sundowns

- CAF Champions League: 2025–26
