= Thato Sibiya =

South African soccer player (born 2006)

Personal information
- Full name: Thato Majoro Sibiya
- Date of birth: 23 June 2006 (age 20)
- Place of birth: Kagiso, Gauteng, South Africa
- Height: 1.75 m (5 ft 9 in)
- Position: Left-back

Team information
- Current team: Lille B (on loan from Mamelodi Sundowns)

Youth career
- 2018–2023: Panorama F.C.
- 2024–2025: Mamelodi Sundowns Academy

Senior career*
Years	Team	Apps	(Gls)
2026–	Mamelodi Sundowns	1	(0)
2026–	→ Lille B (loan)	0	(0)

International career
2023	South Africa U17	1	(0)
2024–2025	South Africa U20	8	(0)
- * Club domestic league appearances and goals as of 23:55, 17 August 2026 (UTC)

Thato Majoro Sibiya (born 23 June 2006) is a South African professional soccer player who plays as a left-back for Championnat National 2 club Lille B on loan from South African Premiership club Mamelodi Sundowns.

== Playing career ==
Sibiya started his playing career at Panorama F.C. as a 12-year-old.

=== Mamelodi Sundowns ===
In 2024, Sibiya joined the Mamelodi Sundowns Academy. He moved to the senior team during the 2025–26 season, and was an unused substitute at the 2025 FIFA Club World Cup.

Sibiya made his debut for Mamelodi Sundowns on 19 January 2026 during the 2–0 victory against Orbit College. He made his continental debut against Al Hilal from Sudan on 30 January 2026 was part of the team which won the 2026 CAF Champions League final against AS FAR from Morocco.

==== Loan to Lille ====
On 26 August 2026, Sibiya went on a season long loan to Ligue 1 side Lille.

== International career ==
Sibiya has represented South Africa at both U17 and U20 level and was part of the team that won the 2025 U-20 Africa Cup of Nations. He was later selected to play at the 2025 FIFA U-20 World Cup.

== Personal life ==
Sibiya is from Kagiso, Gauteng and went to Krugersdorp High School.

== Career statistics ==
As of match played 30 January 2026

Appearances and goals by club, season and competition
Club	Season	League			Domestic cup (Note: Includes Nedbank Cup and Coupe de France)		Continental		Total	
Club	Season	Division	Apps	Goals	Apps	Goals	Apps	Goals	Apps	Goals
Mamelodi Sundowns	2025–26	South African Premiership	1	0	1	0	2 (Note: Appearances in CAF Champions League)	0	4	0
Lille (loan)	2026–27	Ligue 1	0	0	0	0	0	0	0	0
Career total			1	0	1	0	2	0	4	0

== Honours ==
South Africa

- U-20 Africa Cup of Nations: 2025

Mamelodi Sundowns

- CAF Champions League: 2025–26
- South African Premiership: runner-up 2025–26
