= PSL Reserve League =

DStv Diski Challenge
- Organising body: Premier Soccer League
- Founded: 2014; 12 years ago
- Countries: South Africa
- Number of clubs: 16
- League cup: Diski Challenge Shield
- Current champions: Orlando Pirates U23 (1st title)
- Most championships: Golden Arrows and Stellenbosch (2 titles)
- Broadcaster(s): Supersport

The PSL Reserve League also known as DStv Diski Challenge for sponsorship reason, is the youth reserve team league for the top South African football (soccer) teams in the Premiership.

== History ==
=== Establishment ===
PSL Reserve League was established in 2014 by Multichoice to develop Youth football in South Africa. It has developed many players for the senior teams and some having to represent the national team. Mamelodi Sundowns, Kaizer Chiefs and Orlando Pirates the most clubs who have developed young players and become football superstars. The likes of Keegan Dolly who have played in France for Ligue 1 side Montpellier, Percy Tau also played for Premier League side Brighton & Hove Albion FC, Sphelele Mkhulise are all the products of Mamelodi Sundowns. Kaizer Chiefs are no strangers in developing young players as they have done so in the past before the Reserve League was formed. Njabulo Blom who have played in MLS in the USA. Siyabonga Ngezana who plays in Romanian League for FCSB. Orlando Pirates have also produced a star player of their own Lyle Foster who plays for Premier league side Burnely FC, Relebohile Mofokeng who plays for Belgian Pro League side Royale Union Saint-Gilloise, Mbekezeli Mbokazi who plays for Major League Soccer side Chicago Fire FC and Mohau Nkota who plays for Saudi Pro League side Al-Ettifaq Club.

=== Format ===
When the reserve league was formed in 2014, all 16 teams were placed in two groups of 8 teams. Top 4 qualified for knockout stages, quarterfinals, Semi-finals and finals.

That all changed in 2017/18 season, adopting a two-round home and away league basic. All teams to play 30 games, 15 home games and 15 away games. The team with the most points wins the league.

== Sponsorship ==
PSL Reserve League was sponsored by Multichoice Company from 2017/18 season to 2019/20 season, it was known as Multichoice Diski Challenge. In the 2020/2021 Season DStv announced that they were going to sponsor the Premiership as well as the PSL Reserve League.

== Broadcasting ==
The DStv Diski Challenge is broadcast by Supersport every weekends. Supersport only show 4 matches, 2 on Saturdays and 2 on Sundays.

== Champions ==
Season	Champions
2014/15	Amatuks U21
2015/16	Golden Arrows U21
2016/17	Mamelodi Sundowns U21
2017/18	Golden Arrows U21
2018/19	Bloemfontein Celtic U21
2019/20	Bidvest Wits U21
2020/21	AmaZulu U23
2021/22	Stellenbosch U23
2022/23	Supersport United U23
2023/24	Stellenbosch U23
2024/25	Kaizer Chiefs U23
2025/26	Orlando Pirates U23

=== Results by team ===
Club	Wins	Years won
Stellenbosch U23	2	2021–22, 2023–24
Golden Arrows U21	2	2015–16, 2017–18
AmaTuks U21	1	2014–15
AmaZulu U23	1	2020–21
Bidvest Wits U21	1	2019–20
Bloemfontein Celtic U21	1	2018–19
Kaizer Chiefs U23	1	2024–25
Mamelodi Sundowns U21	1	2014–15
SuperSport U23	1	2022–23
Orlando Pirates U23	1	2025-26
