= Espérance Sportive de Tunis in international football =

Espérance de Tunis in international football
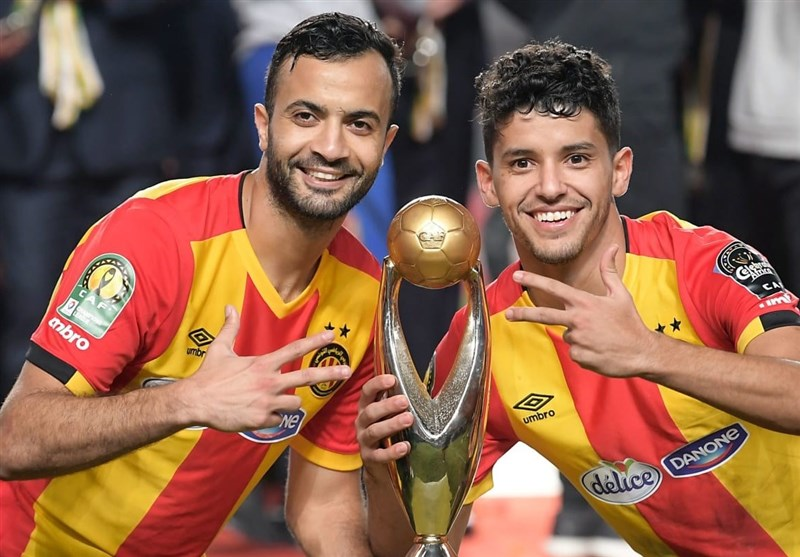
- Espérance Sportive de Tunis, CAF Champions League Champions in 2018
- Club: Espérance de Tunis
- Top scorer: Anice Badri (19)
- First entry: 1971 African Cup of Champions Clubs
- Latest entry: 2023–24 CAF Champions League

Titles
- Champions League: 4: 1994; 2011; 2018; 2019
- Cup Winners' Cup: 1: 1998
- CAF Cup: 1: 1997
- Super Cup: 1: 1995
- Afro-Asian Cup: 1: 1995

For the official article, check Espérance Sportive de Tunis.

Espérance de Tunis, a Tunisian professional association football club, has gained entry to Confederation of African Football (CAF) competitions on several occasions. They have represented Tunisia in the Champions League on twenty four occasions, the Confederation Cup on one occasion, the now-defunct Cup Winners' Cup four separate occasions, and the now-defunct CAF Cup one occasion.

== History ==
=== Achieved three CAF Champions League (2010–2020) ===
The beginning was in the 2010 CAF Champions League where Espérance de Tunis reached the first final in ten years, The beginning of the journey was against East End Lions and ended with a score of 5–4, in the next round against ASFA Yennenga It ended in victory back and forth with 7–2 on Aggregate, in the last match before the group stage against the Sudanese club Al-Merrikh SC ended with a 4–1 victory on Aggregate, in the group stage draw, Espérance de Tunis fell in Group A with TP Mazembe, ES Sétif and Dynamos where did finish in first place with 13 points. Espérance faced Al Ahly SC from Egypt in the semi-final and lost the first leg 2–1 away from home. In need of a win in the second leg, Espérance were victorious 1–0 and reached the final on the away goals rule. In the final against TP Mazembe, Esperance received a heavy defeat in the first leg 5–0 at Stade Frederic Kibassa Maliba and in the second leg ended 1–1. In the same version, Nigerian striker Michael Eneramo won top goalscorers with 8 goals.

In the next version the goal was to achieve the title, in the first round against ASPAC FC from Benin where they won 5–2 on Aggregate, in the second round against ASC Diaraf won back and forth with 6–0 on Aggregate to qualify for the group stage. were drawn in Group B with Wydad Casablanca, MC Alger and Al Ahly SC finished in first place with 10 points to qualify for the semi-final, where they faced Al-Hilal Club ended with a 3–0 victory on Aggregate. to face in the final Wydad Casablanca Where finished the first leg 0–0 draw and in the second leg at Stade 7 November, Harrison Afful scored the winning goal and won the second title in its history after 17 years. To guarantee a seat in the FIFA Club World Cup for the first time where Espérance finished sixth after losing against Monterrey 3–2. On 25 February 2012, Espérance de Tunis faced Maghreb de Fès the CAF Confederation Cup champion in the CAF Super Cup final and ended in a 4–3 loss on penalties.

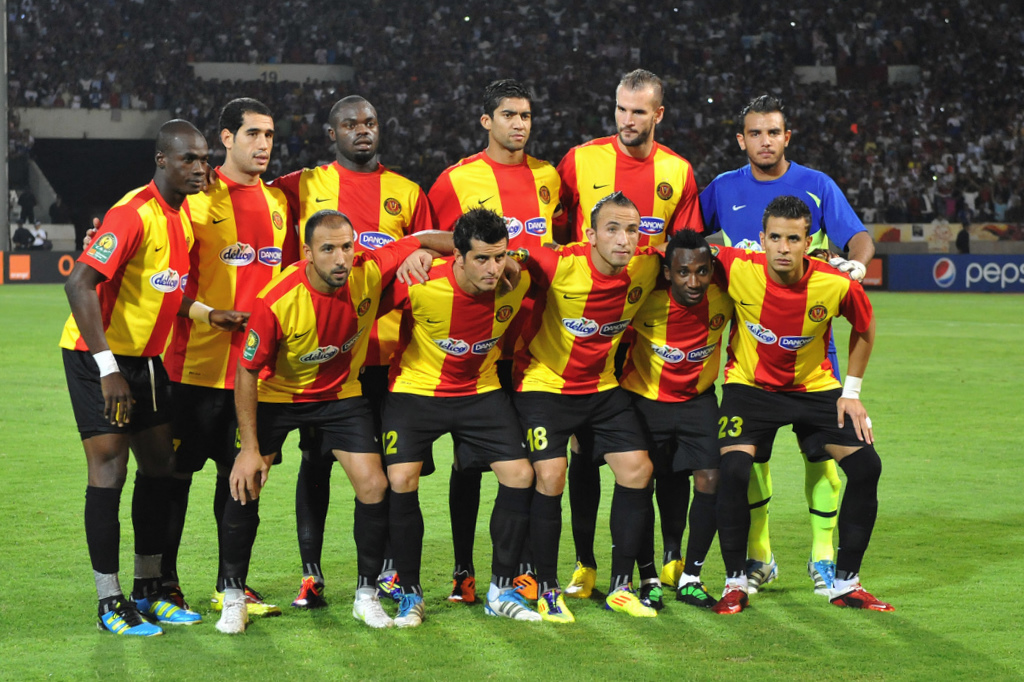
Espérance Sportive de Tunis, CAF Champions League Champions in 2011

In 2012 CAF Champions League Espérance de Tunis reached the final for the third time in a row, this time against Al Ahly SC of Egypt in the first leg at Borg El Arab Stadium, which ended in a 1–1 draw. As for the second leg, the surprise happened and Al Ahly SC won 1–2. after that Espérance de Tunis level appeared to decline, as in 2013 it was eliminated in the semi-final against Orlando Pirates on the away goals rule. in 2014 from the group stage included ES Sétif, CS Sfaxien and Al-Ahly Benghazi. and in 2015, the worst Where was eliminated in the second round against Al-Merrikh SC. In the 2018 CAF Champions League, Espérance de Tunis returned to its high level in the Preliminary round. It was easy to qualify against ASAC Concorde and in the first round against the Kenyan Gor Mahia, Espérance qualified to the group stage with the goal of Anice Badri. Where he finished second behind Al-Ahly to face in the Quarter-finals Étoile du Sahel where they won 3–1 on Aggregate, and in the Semi-finals Espérance won against Primeiro de Agosto 4–3 on Aggregate to reach the final after 6 years against the same Egyptian club Al-Ahly, but this time Espérance de Tunis won the title 4–3 on Aggregate. to qualify for the FIFA Club World Cup, where finished fifth after winning against Guadalajara 6–5 on penalties. Then in the 2019 CAF Super Cup against Raja Casablanca, played for the first time outside Africa in Qatar at Thani bin Jassim Stadium. ended with a 2–1 defeat.

== CAF competitions ==
Espérance de Tunis results in CAF competition
Season	Competition	Round	Opposition	Home	Away	Aggregate
1971	Cup of Champions Clubs	First round	(Libya) Al-Ahly Benghazi	0–0	1–0	1–0
1971	Cup of Champions Clubs	Second round	(Egypt) Al-Ismaily	Walkover		
1980	Cup Winners' Cup	First round	(Niger) Ader Club	Walkover		
1980	Cup Winners' Cup	Second round	(Republic of Upper Volta) RC Kadiogo	Walkover		
1981	Cup Winners' Cup	First round	(Niger) Zoundourma	Walkover		
1986	Cup of Champions Clubs	First round	(Sudan) Al-Merrikh	1–0	1–2	2–2 (a)
1986	Cup of Champions Clubs	Second round	(Algeria) JS Kabylie	1–0	1–2	2–2 (a)
1986	Cup of Champions Clubs	Quarter-finals	(Ivory Coast) Africa Sports	2–1	0–1	2–2 (a)
1987	Cup Winners' Cup	First round	(Mauritania) ASC Garde Nationale	4–0	3–1	7–1
1987	Cup Winners' Cup	Second round	(Egypt) Al-Tersana	2–0	0–0	2–0
1987	Cup Winners' Cup	Quarter-finals	(Morocco) FAR Rabat	3–1	0–1	3–2
1987	Cup Winners' Cup	Semi-finals	(Nigeria) Abiola Babes	2–0	0–1	2–1
1987	Cup Winners' Cup	Final	(Kenya) Gor Mahia	2–2	1–1	3–3 (a)
1989	Cup of Champions Clubs	First round	(Burkina Faso) Étoile Filante	2–1	0–0	2–1
1989	Cup of Champions Clubs	Second round	(Algeria) MC Oran	3–2	1–3	4–5
1990	Cup of Champions Clubs	First round	(Mali) Stade Malien	2–0	1–0	3–0
1990	Cup of Champions Clubs	Second round	(Egypt) Al Ahly	0–0	0–0	0–0 (4–2 p)
1990	Cup of Champions Clubs	Quarter-finals	(Nigeria) Iwuanyanwu Nationale	1–1	1–2	2–3
1994	Cup of Champions Clubs	First round	(Burkina Faso) Étoile Filante	5–0	3–2	8–2
1994	Cup of Champions Clubs	Second round	(Mali) Stade Malien	3–0	1–0	4–0
1994	Cup of Champions Clubs	Quarter-finals	(Nigeria) Iwuanyanwu Nationale	3–0	1–1	4–1
1994	Cup of Champions Clubs	Semi-finals	(Algeria) MC Oran	3–1	2–2	5–3
1994	Cup of Champions Clubs	Final	(Egypt) Zamalek	3–1	0–0	3–1
1995	Cup of Champions Clubs	First round	(Burkina Faso) Étoile Filante	4–1	1–1	5–2
1995	Cup of Champions Clubs	Second round	(Mauritius) Fire Brigade SC	2–0	2–0	4–0
1995	Cup of Champions Clubs	Quarter-finals	(Egypt) Ismaily	0–1	0–0	0–1
1995	Afro-Asian Cup	Final	(Thailand) Thai Farmers Bank	3–0	1–1	4–1
1997	CAF Cup	First round	(Togo) ASKO Kara	7–0	1–3	8–3
1997	CAF Cup	Second round	(Burkina Faso) US Forces Armées	4–1	1–1	5–2
1997	CAF Cup	Quarter-finals	(Cameroon) Coton Sport	4–1	1–3	5–4
1997	CAF Cup	Semi-finals	(Uganda) Kampala City	6–0	3–1	9–1
1997	CAF Cup	Final	(Angola) Petro Atlético	2–0	0–1	2–1
1998	Cup Winners' Cup	First round	(Mali) Stade Malien	1–0	2–1	3–1
1998	Cup Winners' Cup	Second round	(Uganda) Express Red Eagles	2–0	0–1	2–1
1998	Cup Winners' Cup	Quarter-finals	(Gabon) Mbilinga FC	2–0	2–0	4–0
1998	Cup Winners' Cup	Semi-finals	(Morocco) Wydad Casablanca	4–1	0–2	4–3
1998	Cup Winners' Cup	Final	(Angola) Primeiro de Agosto	3–1	1–1	4–2
1999	Champions League	First round	(Libya) Al-Mahalah	2–0	2–1	4–1
1999	Champions League	Second round	(Sudan) Al-Hilal	5–0	3–3	8–3
1999	Champions League	Group stage	(Ivory Coast) ASEC Mimosas	3–0	0–1	1st place
1999	Champions League	Group stage	(Zimbabwe) Dynamos Harare	1–0	2–0	1st place
1999	Champions League	Group stage	(Réunion) SS Saint-Louisienne	5–0	2–0	1st place
1999	Champions League	Final	(Morocco) Raja Casablanca	0–0	0–0	0–0 (3–4 p)
2000	Champions League	First round	(Rwanda) APR FC	7–0		7–0
2000	Champions League	Second round	(Mali) Djoliba AC	3–2	1–1	4–3
2000	Champions League	Group stage	(Cameroon) Sable FC	4–0	2–1	1st place
2000	Champions League	Group stage	(Ivory Coast) Africa Sports	2–0	1–2	1st place
2000	Champions League	Group stage	(South Africa) Mamelodi Sundowns	3–2	0–2	1st place
2000	Champions League	Final	(Ghana) Hearts of Oak	1–2	1–3	2–5
2001	Champions League	First round	(Niger) JS du Ténéré	1–0	3–1	4–1
2001	Champions League	Second round	(Kenya) Tusker FC	1–0	1–2	2–2 (a)
2001	Champions League	Group stage	(South Africa) Mamelodi Sundowns	0–0	0–0	1st place
2001	Champions League	Group stage	(Democratic Republic of the Congo) TP Mazembe	2–1	2–3	1st place
2001	Champions League	Group stage	(Nigeria) Julius Berger	3–2	1–1	1st place
2001	Champions League	Semi-finals	(Egypt) Al Ahly	1–1	0–0	1–1 (a)
2002	Champions League	First round	(Chad) Tourbillon FC	5–1	3–1	8–2
2002	Champions League	Second round	(Libya) Al Madina	4–0	1–2	5–2
2002	Champions League	Group stage	(Mozambique) Costa do Sol	4–1	1–0	3rd place
2002	Champions League	Group stage	(Egypt) Zamalek	1–1	0–1	3rd place
2002	Champions League	Group stage	(Ivory Coast) ASEC Mimosas	2–0	1–3	3rd place
2003	Champions League	First round	(Rwanda) Rayon Sport	5–0	2–2	7–2
2003	Champions League	Second round	(Zimbabwe) Highlanders FC	6–0	1–1	7–1
2003	Champions League	Group stage	(Cameroon) Canon Yaoundé	2–1	1–1	1st place
2003	Champions League	Group stage	(Algeria) USM Alger	2–0	1–0	1st place
2003	Champions League	Group stage	(Angola) AS Aviação	1–0	0–0	1st place
2003	Champions League	Semi-finals	(Egypt) Ismaily	1–3	1–3	2–6
2004	Champions League	First round	(Niger) Sahel SC	4–0	1–0	5–0
2004	Champions League	Second round	(Cameroon) Coton Sport	3–0	0–1	3–1
2004	Champions League	Group stage	(South Africa) Supersport United	2–0	2–1	1st place
2004	Champions League	Group stage	(Senegal) Jeanne d'Arc	5–0	1–2	1st place
2004	Champions League	Group stage	(Algeria) USM Alger	2–1	0–3	1st place
2004	Champions League	Semi-finals	(Nigeria) Enyimba	1–1	1–1	2–2 (5–6 p)
2005	Champions League	First round	(Sudan) Al-Hilal	5–1	0–2	5–3
2005	Champions League	Second round	(South Africa) Kaizer Chiefs	4–0	1–2	5–2
2005	Champions League	Group stage	(Tunisia) Étoile du Sahel	1–1	0–0	4th place
2005	Champions League	Group stage	(Ivory Coast) ASEC Mimosas	0–0	0–1	4th place
2005	Champions League	Group stage	(Egypt) Zamalek	1–2	1–1	4th place
2006	Confederation Cup	First round	(Senegal) ASC CS Sucrière	3–0	1–0	4–0
2006	Confederation Cup	Second round	(Egypt) Al-Ittihad Al-Iskandary	1–0	0–1	1–1 (a)
2006	Confederation Cup	Play-off round	(Morocco) Raja Casablanca	2–0	0–0	2–0
2006	Confederation Cup	Group stage	(Tunisia) Étoile du Sahel	1–3	0–1	2nd place
2006	Confederation Cup	Group stage	(Democratic Republic of the Congo) FC Saint Eloi Lupopo	1–0	2–2	2nd place
2006	Confederation Cup	Group stage	(Equatorial Guinea) Renacimiento FC	5–0	1–1	2nd place
2007	Champions League	Preliminary round	(Chad) Renaissance FC	4–0	2–1	6–1
2007	Champions League	First round	(Zambia) Zanaco FC	2–0	4–1	6–1
2007	Champions League	Second round	(Tanzania) Young Africans FC	3–0	0–0	3–0
2007	Champions League	Group stage	(Ivory Coast) ASEC Mimosas	0–0	0–2	4th place
2007	Champions League	Group stage	(Sudan) Al-Hilal	1–1	0–2	4th place
2007	Champions League	Group stage	(Egypt) Al Ahly	1–0	0–3	4th place
2008	Confederation Cup	First round	(Morocco) Rachad Bernoussi	2–0	1–3	3–3 (a)
2008	Confederation Cup	Second round	(Togo) US Masséda	6–1	0–1	6–2
2008	Confederation Cup	Play-off round	(Tunisia) Étoile du Sahel	0–0	0–2	0–2
2010	Champions League	Preliminary Round	(Sierra Leone) East End Lions	3–2	2–2	5–4
2010	Champions League	First round	(Burkina Faso) ASFA Yennenga	4–1	3–1	7–2
2010	Champions League	Second round	(Sudan) Al-Merrikh	3–0	1–1	4–1
2010	Champions League	Group stage	(Algeria) ES Sétif	2–2	1–0	1st place
2010	Champions League	Group stage	(Zimbabwe) Dynamos	1–0	1–0	1st place
2010	Champions League	Group stage	(Democratic Republic of the Congo) TP Mazembe	3–0	1–2	1st place
2010	Champions League	Semi-finals	(Egypt) Al Ahly	1–0	1–2	2–2 (a)
2010	Champions League	Final	(Democratic Republic of the Congo) TP Mazembe	1–1	0–5	1–6
2011	Champions League	First round	(Benin) ASPAC	5–0	0–2	5–2
2011	Champions League	Second round	(Senegal) Diaraf	5–0	1–0	6–0
2011	Champions League	Group stage	(Algeria) MC Alger	4–0	1–1	1st place
2011	Champions League	Group stage	(Egypt) Al-Ahly	1–0	1–1	1st place
2011	Champions League	Group stage	(Morocco) Wydad Casablanca	0–0	2–2	1st place
2011	Champions League	Semi-finals	(Sudan) Al-Hilal	2–0	1–0	3–0
2011	Champions League	Final	(Morocco) Wydad Casablanca	1–0	0–0	1–0
2012	Champions League	First round	(The Gambia) Brikama United	3–1	1–1	4–2
2012	Champions League	Second round	(Zimbabwe) Dynamos	6–0	1–1	7–1
2012	Champions League	Group stage	(Nigeria) Sunshine Stars	1–0	2–0	1st place
2012	Champions League	Group stage	(Algeria) ASO Chlef	3–2	0–1	1st place
2012	Champions League	Group stage	(Tunisia) Étoile du Sahel	Annulled	Suspended	1st place
2012	Champions League	Semi-finals	(Democratic Republic of the Congo) TP Mazembe	1–0	0–0	1–0
2012	Champions League	Final	(Egypt) Al Ahly	1–2	1–1	2–3
2013	Champions League	First round	(Angola) Primeiro de Agosto	1–0	1–0	2–0
2013	Champions League	Second round	(Algeria) JSM Béjaïa	1–0	0–0	1–0
2013	Champions League	Group stage	(Angola) Recreativo do Libolo	3–2	0–1	1st place
2013	Champions League	Group stage	(Cameroon) Coton Sport	2–0	2–1	1st place
2013	Champions League	Group stage	(Ivory Coast) Séwé Sport	1–0	1–0	1st place
2013	Champions League	Semi-finals	(South Africa) Orlando Pirates	1–1	0–0	1–1 (a)
2014	Champions League	First round	(Kenya) Gor Mahia	5–0	3–2	8–2
2014	Champions League	Second round	(Mali) AS Real Bamako	3–0	1–1	4–1
2014	Champions League	Group stage	(Algeria) ES Sétif	1–2	2–2	3rd place
2014	Champions League	Group stage	(Libya) Al-Ahly Benghazi	1–0	2–3	3rd place
2014	Champions League	Group stage	(Tunisia) CS Sfaxien	2–1	0–1	3rd place
2015	Champions League	First round	(Cameroon) Cosmos de Bafia	3–1	1–0	4–1
2015	Champions League	Second round	(Sudan) Al-Merrikh	2–1	0–1	2–2 (a)
2015	Confederation Cup	Play-off round	(Ghana) Hearts of Oak	4–0	1–1	5–1
2015	Confederation Cup	Group stage	(Egypt) Al-Ahly	0–1	0–3	4th place
2015	Confederation Cup	Group stage	(Tunisia) Étoile du Sahel	0–1	1–2	4th place
2015	Confederation Cup	Group stage	(Mali) Stade Malien	1–2	1–0	4th place
2016	Confederation Cup	First round	(Chad) Renaissance FC	5–0	2–0	7–0
2016	Confederation Cup	Second round	(Tanzania) Azam	3–0	1–2	4–2
2016	Confederation Cup	Play-off round	(Algeria) MO Béjaïa	1–1	0–0	1–1 (a)
2017	Champions League	First round	(Guinea) Horoya	3–1	1–2	4–3
2017	Champions League	Group stage	(Democratic Republic of the Congo) AS Vita Club	3–1	2–2	1st place
2017	Champions League	Group stage	(Ethiopia) Saint George	4–0	0–0	1st place
2017	Champions League	Group stage	(South Africa) Mamelodi Sundowns	0–0	2–1	1st place
2017	Champions League	Quarter-finals	(Egypt) Al-Ahly	2–2	1–2	3–4
2018	Champions League	Preliminary round	(Mauritania) ASAC Concorde	5–0	1–1	6–1
2018	Champions League	First round	(Kenya) Gor Mahia	1–0	0–0	1–0
2018	Champions League	Group stage	(Egypt) Al-Ahly	0–1	0–0	2nd place
2018	Champions League	Group stage	(Botswana) Township Rollers	4–1	0–0	2nd place
2018	Champions League	Group stage	(Uganda) Kampala City	3–2	1–0	2nd place
2018	Champions League	Quarter-finals	(Tunisia) Étoile du Sahel	2–1	1–0	3–1
2018	Champions League	Semi-finals	(Angola) Primeiro de Agosto	4–2	0–1	4–3
2018	Champions League	Final	(Egypt) Al-Ahly	3–0	1–3	4–3
2018–19	Champions League	Group stage	(Guinea) Horoya	2–0	1–1	1st place
2018–19	Champions League	Group stage	(Zimbabwe) FC Platinum	2–0	2–1	1st place
2018–19	Champions League	Group stage	(South Africa) Orlando Pirates	2–0	0–0	1st place
2018–19	Champions League	Quarter-finals	(Algeria) CS Constantine	3–1	3–2	6–3
2018–19	Champions League	Semi-finals	(Democratic Republic of the Congo) TP Mazembe	1–0	0–0	1–0
2018–19	Champions League	Final	(Morocco) Wydad Casablanca	1–0	1–1	Abandoned (Note: With the score 1–0 in favor of Espérance de Tunis in the 59th minute, Walid El Karti scored a goal for Wydad Casablanca which was subsequently ruled offside by the linesman. Due to a failure of the video assistant referee system, a review of the decision could not be conducted. Believing the goal was valid, Wydad Casablanca protested the decision and the match was interrupted. After 80 minutes of stoppage, the referee ruled the match as a forfeit by Wydad Casablanca and awarded to Espérance de Tunis, securing them the CAF Champions League title. However, on 5 June 2019 the CAF Executive Committee ordered a replay of the second leg at a neutral venue, requiring Espérance de Tunis to return the trophy and medals. However, the decision to order a replay of the second leg was thrown out by the Court of Arbitration for Sport (CAS) on 31 July 2019, who required CAF to refer the case to its proper disciplinary structures for a decision. On 7 August 2019, Espérance de Tunis were again officially declared champions after the CAF Disciplinary Board ruled that Wydad Casablanca "is considered to have lost the game in the 2nd leg.")
2019–20	Champions League	First round	(Chad) Elect-Sport	2–1	1–1	3–2
2019–20	Champions League	Group stage	(Morocco) Raja Casablanca	2–2	2–0	1st place
2019–20	Champions League	Group stage	(Algeria) JS Kabylie	1–0	0–1	1st place
2019–20	Champions League	Group stage	(Democratic Republic of the Congo) AS Vita Club	0–0	2–0	1st place
2019–20	Champions League	Quarter-finals	(Egypt) Zamalek	1–0	1–3	2–3
2020–21	Champions League	First round	(Libya) Al Ahly Benghazi	3–2	0–0	3–2
2020–21	Champions League	Group stage	(Senegal) Teungueth	2–1	1–2	1st place
2020–21	Champions League	Group stage	(Algeria) MC Alger	1–1	1–1	1st place
2020–21	Champions League	Group stage	(Egypt) Zamalek	3–1	1–0	1st place
2020–21	Champions League	Quarter-finals	(Algeria) CR Belouizdad	2–0	0–2	2–2 (3–2 p)
2020–21	Champions League	Semi-finals	(Egypt) Al-Ahly	0–1	0–3	0–4
2021–22	Champions League	Second round	(Libya) Al Ittihad	1–0	0–0	1–0
2021–22	Champions League	Group stage	(Botswana) Jwaneng Galaxy	4–0	3–0	1st place
2021–22	Champions League	Group stage	(Algeria) CR Belouizdad	2–1	1–1	1st place
2021–22	Champions League	Group stage	(Tunisia) Étoile du Sahel	0–0	2–0	1st place
2021–22	Champions League	Quarter-finals	(Algeria) ES Sétif	0–1	0–0	0–1
2022–23	Champions League	Second round	(Nigeria) Plateau United	1–0	1–2	2–2
2022–23	Champions League	Group stage	(Sudan) Al Merrikh	1–0	1–1	1st place
2022–23	Champions League	Group stage	(Algeria) CR Belouizdad	0–0	1–0	1st place
2022–23	Champions League	Group stage	(Egypt) Zamalek	2–0	1–3	1st place
2022–23	Champions League	Quarter-finals	(Algeria) JS Kabylie	1–1	1–0	2–1
2022–23	Champions League	Semi-finals	(Egypt) Al Ahly	0–3	0–1	0–4
2023–24	Champions League	Second round	AS Douanes Burkina Faso	0–0	1–0	1–0
2023–24	Champions League	Group stage	(Tunisia) Étoile du Sahel	2–0	2–0	2nd place
2023–24	Champions League	Group stage	(Sudan) Al Hilal	1–0	1–3	2nd place
2023–24	Champions League	Group stage	(Angola) Petro de Luanda	0–0	0–0	2nd place
2023–24	Champions League	Quarter-finals	(Ivory Coast) ASEC Mimosas	0–0	0–0	0–0 (4–2 p)
2023–24	Champions League	Semi-finals	(South Africa) Mamelodi Sundowns	1–0	1–0	2–0
2023–24	Champions League	Final	(Egypt) Al Ahly	0–0	0–1	0–1
2024–25	Champions League	Second round	(Somalia) Dekedaha	8–0	4–1	12–1
2024–25	Champions League	Group stage	(Mali) Djoliba	4–0	1–0	1st place
2024–25	Champions League	Group stage	(Angola) Sagrada Esperança	4–1	0–0	1st place
2024–25	Champions League	Group stage	(Egypt) Pyramids	2–0	1–2	1st place
2024–25	Champions League	Quarter-finals	(South Africa) Mamelodi Sundowns	0–0	0–1	0–1
2025–26	Champions League	First round	(Niger) AS FAN	4–1	3–0	7–1
2025–26	Champions League	Second round	(Burkina Faso) Rahimo	3–0	1–0	4–0
2025–26	Champions League	Group stage	(Mali) Stade Malien	0–0	0–1	2nd place
2025–26	Champions League	Group stage	(Angola) Petro de Luanda	2–0	1–1	2nd place
2025–26	Champions League	Group stage	(Tanzania) Simba	1–0	2–2	2nd place
2025–26	Champions League	Quarter-finals	(Egypt) Al Ahly	1–0	3–2	4–2
2025–26	Champions League	Semi-finals	(South Africa) Mamelodi Sundowns	0–1	0–1	0–2

== CAF Super Cup ==
Year	Opponent	Score	Venue
1995	(Zaire) DC Motema Pembe	3–0	Alexandria Stadium, Alexandria
1999	(Ivory Coast) ASEC Mimosas	1–3	Stade Félix Houphouët-Boigny, Abidjan
2012	(Morocco) Maghreb de Fès	1–1, 3–4 (P)	Stade Olympique de Radès, Tunis
2019	(Morocco) Raja Casablanca	1–2	Thani bin Jassim Stadium, Al Rayyan
2020	(Egypt) Zamalek	1–3	Thani bin Jassim Stadium, Al Rayyan

== FIFA Club World Cup ==
Year	Round	Opponent	Score	Attendance	Venue
2011	Quarter-final	(Qatar) Al-Sadd	1–2	21,251	Toyota Stadium, Toyota, Japan
2011	Match for fifth place	(Mexico) Monterrey	2–3	13,639	Toyota Stadium, Toyota, Japan
2018	Second round	(United Arab Emirates) Al-Ain	0–3	21,333	Hazza bin Zayed Stadium, Al Ain, United Arab Emirates
2018	Match for fifth place	(Mexico) Guadalajara	1–1, 6–5 (P)	5,883	Hazza bin Zayed Stadium, Al Ain, United Arab Emirates
2019	Second round	(Saudi Arabia) Al-Hilal	0–1	7,726	Jassim bin Hamad Stadium, Doha, Qatar
2019	Match for fifth place	(Qatar) Al-Sadd	6–2	15,037	Khalifa International Stadium, Doha, Qatar

== Non-CAF competitions ==
Non-CAF competition record
Season	Competition	Round	Opposition	Score
1971	Maghreb Cup Winners Cup	Semi-finals	(Algeria) MC Alger	0–3 (Stade d'El Annasser, Algiers)
1971	Maghreb Cup Winners Cup	Third place	(Morocco) FAR de Rabat	2–4 (Stade d'El Annasser, Algiers)
1972	Maghreb Champions Cup	First leg	(Morocco) FAR de Rabat	0–0 (Rabat)
1972	Maghreb Champions Cup	Second leg	(Morocco) FAR de Rabat	1–1 (Tunis)
1972	Maghreb Champions Cup	First leg	(Algeria) CR Belcourt	2–2 (Tunis)
1972	Maghreb Champions Cup	Second leg	(Algeria) CR Belcourt	3–2 (Stade d'El Annasser, Algiers)
1975	Maghreb Champions Cup	Semi-finals	(Morocco) Raja Beni Mellal	2–3 (Casablanca)
1975	Maghreb Champions Cup	Third place	(Algeria) JS Kabylie	0–0 (4–3 p) Casablanca)
1976	Maghreb Champions Cup	Semi-finals	(Algeria) MC Alger	0–1 (Tunis)
1976	Maghreb Champions Cup	Third place	(Morocco) Mouloudia Oujda	4–2 (Tunis)
1992	Arab Club Championship	Group stage	(Palestine) Hilal Al-Quds	7–0 (Doha)
1992	Arab Club Championship	Group stage	(Qatar) Al-Arabi	1–1 (Doha)
1992	Arab Club Championship	Group stage	(Saudi Arabia) Al Shabab	2–3 (Doha)
1995	Arab Club Championship	Group stage	(Sudan) Al-Hilal (Omdurman)	1–0 (Riyadh)
1995	Arab Club Championship	Group stage	(Saudi Arabia) Al-Hilal	1–1 (Riyadh)
1995	Arab Club Championship	Group stage	(Bahrain) East Riffa	0–1 (Riyadh)
1995	Arab Club Championship	Group stage	(Palestine) Jabal Al-Mukaber	7–0 (Riyadh)
1995	Arab Club Championship	Semi-finals	(Algeria) CR Belouizdad	1–0 (Riyadh)
1995	Arab Club Championship	Final	(Saudi Arabia) Al-Hilal	0–1 (Riyadh)
1996	Arab Super Cup	Round 1	(Saudi Arabia) Al-Riyadh	1–1 (Stade El Menzah, Tunis)
1996	Arab Super Cup	Round 2	(Saudi Arabia) Al-Hilal	2–0 (Stade El Menzah, Tunis)
2003–04	Arab Champions League	First round	(Sudan) Al-Hilal Club	3–1 (Al-Hilal Stadium, Omdurman); 6–0 (Stade du 7 Novembre, Tunis)
2003–04	Arab Champions League	Second round	(Algeria) USM Blida	2–1 (Stade Olympique de Radès, Tunis)
2003–04	Arab Champions League	Second round	(Egypt) Zamalek SC	0–3 (Cairo)
2003–04	Arab Champions League	Second round	(Tunisia) CS Sfaxien	1–0 (Stade Hamda Laouani, Kairouan)
2003–04	Arab Champions League	Second round	(Egypt) Zamalek SC	1–2 (Stade Olympique de Radès, Tunis)
2003–04	Arab Champions League	Second round	(Tunisia) CS Sfaxien	1–3 (Stade Olympique de Radès, Tunis)
2003–04	Arab Champions League	Second round	(Algeria) USM Blida	5–0 (Stade Mustapha Tchaker, Blida)
2008–09	Arab Champions League	Round 32	(Libya) Al-Ahly Tripoli	0–0 (Stade Olympique de Radès, Tunis); 0–0 (9–8 p) Tripoli Stadium, Tripoli)
2008–09	Arab Champions League	Round 16	(Yemen) Al-Hilal Al-Sahili	2–1 (Al Ulufi Stadium, Al Hudaydah); 6–1 (Stade du 7 Novembre, Tunis)
2008–09	Arab Champions League	Quarter-finals	(Egypt) Ismaily	2–1 (Ismailia Stadium, Ismailia); 1–2 (4–3 p) Stade du 7 Novembre, Tunis)
2008–09	Arab Champions League	Semi-finals	(Algeria) ES Sétif	1–0 (Stade 8 Mai 1945, Sétif); 2–0 (Stade Olympique de Radès, Tunis)
2008–09	Arab Champions League	Final	(Morocco) Wydad Casablanca	1–0 (Stade Mohamed V, Casablanca); 1–1 (Stade Olympique de Radès, Tunis)
2008-09	North African Cup Winners Cup	First leg	(Morocco) Maghreb de Fès	4–4 (Fès)
2008-09	North African Cup Winners Cup	Second leg	(Morocco) Maghreb de Fès	1–0 (Tunis)
2008-09	North African Cup Winners Cup	First leg	(Algeria) JSM Béjaïa	0–0 (Béjaïa)
2008-09	North African Cup Winners Cup	Second leg	(Algeria) JSM Béjaïa	2–1 (Stade Olympique de Radès, Tunis)
2009	North African Cup of Champions	First leg	(Libya) Al-Ittihad Tripoli	2–1 (Tunis)
2009	North African Cup of Champions	Second leg	(Libya) Al-Ittihad Tripoli	2–2 (Tripoli)
2009	North African Cup of Champions	First leg	(Algeria) ES Sétif	1–1 (Sétif)
2009	North African Cup of Champions	Second leg	(Algeria) ES Sétif	1–1 p(5-6) (Stade Olympique de Radès, Tunis)
2017	Arab Club Championship	Group stage	(Iraq) Naft Al-Wasat	1–0 (Borg El Arab Stadium, Alexandria)
2017	Arab Club Championship	Group stage	(Sudan) Al-Merrikh	2–0 (Borg El Arab Stadium, Alexandria)
2017	Arab Club Championship	Group stage	(Saudi Arabia) Al-Hilal	3–2 (Borg El Arab Stadium, Alexandria)
2017	Arab Club Championship	Semi-finals	(Morocco) Fath Union Sport	2–1 (Alexandria Stadium, Alexandria)
2017	Arab Club Championship	Final	(Jordan) Al-Faisaly	3–2 (Alexandria Stadium, Alexandria)
2018–19	Arab Club Champions Cup	First round	(Egypt) Al Ittihad Alexandria	1–1 (Alexandria Stadium, Alexandria); 2–2 (Stade Olympique de Radès, Tunis)
2019–20	Arab Club Champions Cup	First round	(Lebanon) Nejmeh	1–1 (Camille Chamoun Sports City Stadium, Beirut); 2–0 (Stade Olympique de Radès, Tunis)
2019–20	Arab Club Champions Cup	Second round	(Morocco) Olympic Safi	1–1 (Stade El Massira, Safi); 1–1 (2–4 p) Stade Olympique de Radès, Tunis)
2023	Arab Club Championship	Group stage	(Saudi Arabia) Ittihad Jeddah	1–2 (Taïf)
2023	Arab Club Championship	Group stage	(Iraq) Al-Shorta	0–0 (Taïf)
2023	Arab Club Championship	Group stage	(Tunisia) CS Sfaxien	0–0 (Baha)

== Statistics ==
=== By season ===
Information correct as of 25 May 2024.
Key

- Pld = Played
- W = Games won
- D = Games drawn
- L = Games lost
- F = Goals for
- A = Goals against
- Grp = Group stage
- PR = Preliminary round
- R1 = First round
- R2 = Second round
- POR = Play-off round
- R16 = Round of 16
- QF = Quarter-final
- SF = Semi-final

Key to colours and symbols:

W	Winners
RU	Runners-up

Espérance de Tunis record in African football by season
Season	Competition	Pld	W	D	L	GF	GA	GD	Round
1971	African Cup of Champions Clubs	2	1	1	0	1	0	+1	R2
1980	African Cup Winners' Cup	0	0	0	0	0	0	0	R2
1981	African Cup Winners' Cup	0	0	0	0	0	0	0	R1
1986	African Cup of Champions Clubs	6	3	0	3	6	6	0	QF
1987	African Cup Winners' Cup	10	5	3	2	17	7	+10	RU
1989	African Cup of Champions Clubs	4	2	1	1	6	6	0	R2
1990	African Cup of Champions Clubs	6	2	3	1	5	3	+2	QF
1994	African Cup of Champions Clubs	10	7	3	0	24	7	+17	W
1995	African Cup of Champions Clubs	6	3	2	1	9	3	+6	QF
1995	CAF Super Cup	1	1	0	0	3	0	+3	W
1995	Afro-Asian Club Championship	2	1	1	0	4	1	+3	W
1997	CAF Cup	10	6	1	3	29	11	+18	W
1998	African Cup Winners' Cup	10	7	1	2	17	7	+10	W
1999	CAF Super Cup	1	0	0	1	1	3	−2	RU
1999	CAF Champions League	12	8	3	1	25	5	+20	RU
2000	CAF Champions League	11	6	1	4	25	15	+10	RU
2001	CAF Champions League	12	5	5	2	15	11	+4	SF
2002	CAF Champions League	10	6	1	3	22	10	+12	Grp
2003	CAF Champions League	12	6	4	2	23	11	+12	SF
2004	CAF Champions League	12	7	2	3	22	10	+12	SF
2005	CAF Champions League	10	2	4	4	13	10	+3	Grp
2006	CAF Confederation Cup	12	6	3	3	17	8	+9	Grp
2007	CAF Champions League	12	6	3	3	17	10	+7	Grp
2008	CAF Confederation Cup	6	2	1	3	9	7	+2	POR
2010	CAF Champions League	16	9	4	3	28	19	+9	RU
2011	CAF Champions League	14	8	5	1	24	6	+18	W
2012	CAF Super Cup	1	0	1	0	1	1	0	RU
2012	CAF Champions League	12	6	4	2	20	9	+11	RU
2013	CAF Champions League	12	8	3	1	13	5	+8	SF
2014	CAF Champions League	10	5	2	3	20	12	+8	Grp
2015	CAF Champions League	4	3	0	1	6	3	+3	R2
2015	CAF Confederation Cup	8	2	1	5	8	10	−2	Grp
2016	CAF Confederation Cup	6	3	2	1	12	3	+9	POR
2017	CAF Champions League	10	4	4	2	18	11	+7	QF
2018	CAF Champions League	16	9	4	3	26	12	+14	W
2019	CAF Super Cup	1	0	0	1	1	2	−1	RU
2018–19	CAF Champions League	12	8	4	0	18	6	+12	W
2020	CAF Super Cup	1	0	0	1	1	3	−2	RU
2019–20	CAF Champions League	10	5	3	2	12	8	+4	QF
2020–21	CAF Champions League	12	5	3	4	14	14	0	SF
2021–22	CAF Champions League	10	5	4	1	13	3	+10	QF
2022–23	CAF Champions League	12	5	3	4	10	11	–1	SF
2023	African Football League	4	2	0	2	4	2	+2	SF
2023–24	CAF Champions League	14	6	6	2	9	4	+5	RU
2024–25	CAF Champions League							+	QF
2025–26	CAF Champions League							+	SF
Total		362	185	96	79	568	295	+273	

=== By competition ===
==== In Africa ====
As of 25 May 2024:

CAF competitions
Competition	Seasons	Played	Won	Drawn	Lost	Goals For	Goals Against	Last season played
CAF Champions League	28	289	150	82	57	451	230	2023–24
CAF Cup Winners' Cup (defunct)	2	20	12	4	4	34	14	1998
CAF Confederation Cup	4	32	13	7	12	46	28	2016
CAF Cup (defunct)	1	10	6	1	3	29	11	1997
CAF Super Cup	5	5	1	1	3	7	9	2020
African Football League	1	4	2	0	2	4	2	2023
Afro-Asian Club Championship (defunct)	1	2	1	1	0	4	1	1995
FIFA Club World Cup	3	6	1	1	4	10	12	2019
Total	45	368	186	97	85	585	307	

==== Non-CAF competitions ====
As of 2 August 2023:

Non-CAF competitions
Competition	Seasons	Played	Won	Drawn	Lost	Goals For	Goals Against	Last season played
Arab Champions League	6	29	13	10	6	53	31	2023
Arab Super Cup (defunct)	2	3	1	1	1	5	4	2018
Maghreb Champions Cup (defunct)	3	8	1	2	5	11	12	1976
Maghreb Cup Winners Cup (defunct)	1	2	0	0	2	4	5	1970
Total	12	42	15	14	13	73	52	

== Statistics by country ==
Statistics correct as of game against Elect-Sport on 27 September 2019

=== CAF competitions ===
Country	Club	P	W	D	L	GF	GA	GD
Algeria	JS Kabylie	6	3	1	2	5	4	+1
Algeria	ES Sétif	6	1	3	2	7	8	-1
Algeria	CR Belouizdad	6	3	2	1	5	3	+2
Algeria	MC Oran	4	2	1	1	9	8	+1
Algeria	USM Alger	4	3	0	1	5	4	+1
Algeria	MC Alger	4	1	3	0	7	3	+4
Algeria	ASO Chlef	2	1	0	1	3	3	0
Algeria	JSM Béjaïa	2	1	1	0	1	0	+1
Algeria	MO Béjaïa	2	0	2	0	1	1	0
Algeria	CS Constantine	2	2	0	0	6	3	+3
Subtotal		38	18	13	8	49	37	+12
Angola	Primeiro de Agosto	6	4	1	1	10	5	+5
Angola	Atlético Aviação	2	1	1	0	1	0	+1
Angola	Recreativo do Libolo	2	1	0	1	3	3	0
Angola	Petro de Luanda	2	1	0	1	2	1	+1
Subtotal		12	7	2	3	16	9	+7
Burkina Faso	Étoile Filante	6	4	2	0	15	5	+10
Burkina Faso	US Forces Armées	2	1	1	0	5	2	+3
Burkina Faso	ASFA Yennenga	2	2	0	0	7	2	+5
Subtotal		10	7	3	0	27	9	+18
Cameroon	Coton Sport	6	4	0	2	12	6	+6
Cameroon	Sable FC	2	2	0	0	6	1	+5
Cameroon	Canon Yaoundé	2	1	1	0	3	2	+1
Cameroon	Cosmos de Bafia	2	2	0	0	4	1	+3
Subtotal		12	9	1	2	25	10	+15
(Democratic Republic of the Congo) RD Congo	TP Mazembe							-
(Democratic Republic of the Congo) RD Congo	AS Vita Club	4	2	2	0	7	3	+4
(Democratic Republic of the Congo) RD Congo	FC Saint Eloi Lupopo	2	1	1	0	3	2	+1
(Democratic Republic of the Congo) RD Congo	DC Motema Pembe	1	1	0	0	3	0	+3
Subtotal								+
Egypt	Al-Ahly SC							-
Egypt	Zamalek SC	13	5	3	5	16	16	+0
Egypt	Ismaily SC	4	0	1	3	2	7	-5
Egypt	Ittihad Al-Iskandary	2	1	0	1	1	1	+0
Egypt	Al-Tersana	2	1	1	0	2	0	+2
Subtotal								-15
Ivory Coast	ASEC Mimosas							-
Ivory Coast	Africa Sports	4	2	0	2	5	4	+1
Ivory Coast	Séwé FC	2	2	0	0	2	0	+2
Subtotal								+
Mali	Stade Malien	8	7	0	1	12	3	+9
Mali	Djoliba AC	2	1	1	0	4	3	+1
Mali	Real Bamako	2	1	1	0	4	1	+3
Subtotal		12	9	2	1	19	6	+13
Morocco	Raja Casablanca	7	2	4	1	7	4	+3
Morocco	Wydad Casablanca	8	3	4	1	9	6	+3
Morocco	FAR Rabat	2	1	0	1	3	2	+1
Morocco	Maghreb de Fès	1	0	1	0	1	1	+0
Morocco	Rachad Bernoussi	2	1	0	1	3	3	+0
Subtotal		20	7	9	4	23	16	+7
Nigeria	Heartland FC	4	1	2	1	6	4	+2
Nigeria	Julius Berger FC	2	1	1	0	4	3	+1
Nigeria	Abiola Babes	2	1	0	1	2	1	+1
Nigeria	Sunshine Stars FC	2	2	0	0	3	0	+3
Nigeria	Enyimba FC	2	0	2	0	2	2	0
Nigeria	Plateau United FC	2	1	0	1	2	2	0
Subtotal		14	6	5	3	19	12	+7
Niger	JS du Ténéré	2	2	0	0	4	1	+3
Niger	Sahel SC	2	2	0	0	5	0	+5
Subtotal		4	4	0	0	9	1	+8
South Africa	Kaizer Chiefs	2	1	0	1	5	2	+3
South Africa	Supersport United	2	2	0	0	4	1	+3
South Africa	Orlando Pirates	4	1	3	0	3	1	+2
South Africa	Mamelodi Sundowns	8	4	3	1	7	5	+2
Subtotal		16	8	6	2	19	9	+10
Tanzania	Young Africans FC	2	1	1	0	3	0	+3
Tanzania	Azam FC	2	1	0	1	4	2	+2
Subtotal		4	2	1	1	7	2	+5
Tunisia	Étoile du Sahel	16	7	4	5	16	11	+5
Tunisia	CS Sfaxien	2	1	0	1	2	2	0
Subtotal		18	8	4	6	18	13	+5
Total		0	0	0	0	0	0	0

=== Non-CAF competitions ===
Result summary by country
Country	Pld	W	D	L	GF	GA	GD
Algeria	13	5	5	3	18	13	+5
Egypt	6	1	2	3	7	11	−4
Iraq	1	1	0	0	1	0	+1
Jordan	1	1	0	0	3	2	+1
Lebanon	2	1	1	0	3	1	+2
Libya	4	1	3	0	2	1	+0
Morocco	12	4	6	2	20	18	+2
Saudi Arabia	7	2	2	3	10	10	0
Sudan	3	2	0	1	9	3	+6
Tunisia	2	1	0	1	2	3	−1
Yemen	2	2	0	0	8	2	+6
Palestine	2	2	0	0	14	0	+14
Total	47	22	12	13	86	56	+30

== African competitions goals ==
Statistics correct as of game against Zamalek on 7 March 2023.

P	Player	TOTAL	CCL	CWC	~~CAC~~ CCC	SC FCWC
1	(Tunisia) Ali Zitouni	24	23	-	1	-
2	(Tunisia) Anice Badri	16	14	–	–	2
3	(Cameroon) Yannick N'Djeng	16	15	–	–	1
4	(Tunisia) Haythem Jouini	14	10	–	4	–
=	(Tunisia) Oussama Darragi	14	13	–	–	1
6	(Tunisia) Taha Yassine Khenissi	12	10	–	2	–
7	(Tunisia) Mohamed Ali Ben Romdhane	11	11	–	-	–
=	(Nigeria) Mickael Eneramo	11	8	–	3	–
9	(Tunisia) Moïne Chaâbani	10	6	–	4	–
10	(Tunisia) Wajdi Bouazzi	9	9	–	–	–
=	(Tunisia) Hassen Gabsi	9	9	–	–	–
=	(Tunisia) Youssef Msakni	9	9	–	–	–
=	(Tunisia) Radhi Jaïdi	9	9	–	–	–
=	(Tunisia) Mourad Melki	9	9	–	–	–
=	(Algeria) Youcef Belaïli	9	7	–	–	2
16	(Tunisia) Amine Ltaïef	8	8	–	–	–
17	(Tunisia) Ayadi Hamrouni	7	7	–	–	–
=	(Ivory Coast) (United Arab Emirates) Ibrahim Diaky	7	7	–	–	–
19	(Ivory Coast) Fousseny Coulibaly	6	6	–	–	–
=	(Tunisia) Maher Kanzari	6	6	–	–	–
=	(Tunisia) Skander Souayah	6	6	–	–	–
=	(Tunisia) Ali Ben Neji	6	6	–	–	–
=	(Brazil) Marcos	6	6	–	–	–
=	(Ghana) Harrison Afful	6	5	–	1	–
=	(Tunisia) Kamel Zaiem	6	5	–	1	–
=	(Tunisia) Saad Bguir	6	5	–	1	–
27	(Tunisia) Iheb Msakni	5	5	–	–	–
=	(Tunisia) Jawhar Mnari	5	5	–	–	–
=	(Tunisia) Ahmed Akaïchi	5	5	–	–	–
=	(Nigeria) edett ajou	5	5	–	–	–
=	(Brazil) Reinaldo Illiloya	5	5	–	–	–
=	(Tunisia) Ghailene Chaalali	5	2	–	3	–
=	(Tunisia) Idriss Mhirsi	5	4	–	1	–
34	(Tunisia) Walid Hichri	4	4	–	–	–
=	(Zambia) Kenneth Malitoli	4	4	-	-	-
=	(Tunisia) Khaled Ayari	4	4	–	–	–
=	(Tunisia) Bilel Mejri	4	4	–	–	–
=	(Algeria) Raouf Benguit	4	3	–	–	1
=	(Tunisia) Khalil Chemmam	4	3	–	–	1
=	(Libya) Hamdou Elhouni	4	1	–	–	3
=	(Morocco) Hicham Aboucherouane	4	2	–	2	–
40	(Tunisia) Mohamed Ali Yacoubi	3	3	–	–	–
=	(Tunisia) Salema Kasdaoui	3	3	–	–	–
=	(Tunisia) Khaled Mouelhi	3	2	–	–	1
=	(Nigeria) Emem Eduok	3	–	–	3	–
44	(Cameroon) Franck Kom	2	2	–	–	–
=	(Tunisia) Karim Aouadhi	2	2	–	–	–
=	(Cameroon) Guy Toindouba	2	2	–	–	–
=	(Tunisia) Mejdi Traoui	2	2	–	–	–

P	Player	TOTAL	CCL	CWC	~~CAC~~ CCC	SC FCWC
=	(Tunisia) Ferjani Sassi	2	2	–	–	–
=	(Ivory Coast) Ibrahim Ouattara	2	2	–	–	–
=	(Tunisia) Chamseddine Dhaouadi	2	2	–	–	–
=	(Algeria) Fedi Ben Choug	2	2	–	–	–
=	(Tunisia) Chakib Lachkham	2	2	–	–	–
=	(Tunisia) Fakhreddine Ben Youssef	3	1	–	2	–
=	(Tunisia) Ilyes Jelassi	2	–	–	2	–
=	(Tunisia) Sameh Derbali	2	1	–	–	1
41	(Tunisia) Edem Rjaïbi	1	1	–	–	–
=	(Cameroon) Banana Yaya	1	1	–	–	–
=	(Mali) Dramane Traoré	1	1	–	–	–
=	(Tunisia) Khaled Gharsellaoui	1	1	–	–	–
=	(Algeria) Antar Yahia	1	1	–	–	–
=	(Tunisia) Aymen Ben Omar	1	1	–	–	–
=	(Tunisia) Zied Derbali	1	1	–	–	–
=	(Tunisia) Skander Cheikh	1	1	–	–	–
=	(Tunisia) Ali Machani	1	1	–	–	–
=	(Algeria) Billel Bensaha	1	1	–	–	–
=	(Tunisia) Iheb Mbarki	1	1	–	–	–
=	(Tunisia) Arbi Jabeur	1	1	–	–	–
=	(Tunisia) Saif Jerbi	1	1	–	–	–
=	(Tunisia) Maher Ben Sghaïer	1	1	–	–	–
=	(Tunisia) Houcine Erbeia	1	1	–	–	–
=	(Tunisia) Mohamed Amine Meskini	1	1	–	–	–
=	(Tunisia) Walid Tayeb	1	1	–	–	–
=	(Tunisia) Wassim Naghmouchi	1	–	–	1	–
=	Own Goals	1	1	–	–	–
Totals		265	212	0	20	13

=== Hat-tricks ===
N	Date	Player	Match	Score	Time of goals
1	26 January 2007	Amine Ltaïef	Espérance de Tunis – Renaissance FC	4–0	16', 22', 47'
2	10 September 2011	Yannick N'Djeng	Espérance de Tunis – MC Alger	4–0	21', 43', 55'
3	10 March 2014	Haythem Jouini	Espérance de Tunis – Gor Mahia	5–0	45', 49', 57'
4	17 December 2019	Hamdou Elhouni	Al-Sadd – Espérance de Tunis	2–6	6', 42', 74'
5	12 February 2022	Mohamed Ali Ben Romdhane	Espérance de Tunis – Jwaneng Galaxy	4–0	1', 29', 32'
6	21 September 2024	Youcef Belaïli	Espérance de Tunis – Dekedaha	8–0	18', 45', 51'
7	18 January 2025	Achref Jabri	Espérance de Tunis – Sagrada Esperança	4–1	16', 55', 59'

=== Two goals one match ===
N	Date	Player	Match	Score
1	28 Aug 2010	Eneramo	Espérance de Tunis – TP Mazembe	3–0
2	19 Mar 2011	Y.Msakni	Espérance de Tunis – ASPAC	5–0
3	23 Apr 2011	Darragi	Espérance de Tunis – ASC Diaraf	5–0
4	28 Apr 2012	Y.Msakni	Espérance de Tunis – Dynamos	6–0
5	20 Jul 2012	Mouelhi	Espérance de Tunis – ASO Chlef	3–2
6	14 Sep 2013	N'Djeng	Espérance de Tunis – CRD Libolo	3–2
7	9 Aug 2014	Akaïchi	ES Sétif – Espérance de Tunis	2–2
8	5 Apr 2015	N'Djeng	Espérance de Tunis – Cosmos de Bafia	3–1
9	17 May 2015	Eduok	Espérance de Tunis – Hearts of Oak	4–0
10	19 Mar 2016	Mhirsi	Espérance de Tunis – Renaissance	5–0
11	11 Mar 2017	Sassi	Espérance de Tunis – Horoya	3–1
12	2 Jun 2017	Khenissi	Mamelodi Sundowns – Espérance de Tunis	1–2

N	Date	Player	Match	Score
13	1 Jul 2017	Khenissi	AS Vita Club – Espérance de Tunis	2–2
14	21 Feb 2018	Badri	Espérance de Tunis – ASAC Concorde	5–0
15	15 May 2018	Badri	Espérance de Tunis – Township Rollers	4–1
16	9 Nov 2018	Bguir	Espérance de Tunis – Al-Ahly	3–0
17	18 Jan 2019	Khenissi	Espérance de Tunis – FC Platinum	2–0
18	13 Apr 2019	Bguir	Espérance de Tunis – CS Constantine	3–1
19	17 Dec 2019	Badri	Al-Sadd – Espérance de Tunis	2–6
20	6 Mar 2021	Ben Romdhane	Espérance de Tunis – Zamalek	3–1
21	19 Mar 2022	Eduwo	Jwaneng Galaxy – Espérance de Tunis	0–3
22	15 Sep 2024	Belaïli	Dekedaha – Espérance de Tunis	1–4
23	21 Sep 2025	Diakité	AS FAN – Espérance de Tunis	0–3

== Non-CAF competitions goals ==
P	Player	Arab Club Champions Cup	Afro-Asian Club Championship	Arab Super Cup
=	(Tunisia) Taha Yassine Khenissi	4	0	0
=	(Tunisia) Wajdi Bouazzi	3	0	0
=	(Tunisia) Ben Younès	3	0	0
=	(Tunisia) Ali Zitouni	3	0	0
=	(Tunisia) Hassen Gabsi	2	0	1
=	(Tunisia) Anice Badri	2	0	0
=	(Tunisia) Amine Ltaïef	2	0	0
=	(Tunisia) Oussama Darragi	3	0	0
=	(Tunisia) Abdelkader Ben Hassen	0	3	0
=	(Tunisia) Jamel Bouhlal	2	0	0
=	(Tunisia) Souayah	1	0	0
=	(Tunisia) El Kamel Ben Abdelaziz	1	0	0
=	(Tunisia) Abdeljabar Machouche	1	0	0

P	Player	Arab Club Champions Cup	Afro-Asian Club Championship	Arab Super Cup
=	(Tunisia) Mourad Melki	1	0	0
=	(Tunisia) Bilel Lahmar	1	0	0
=	(Tunisia) Binié	1	0	0
=	(Tunisia) Abdelhamid Kenzari	1	0	0
=	(Tunisia) Radhi Jaïdi	1	0	0
=	(Tunisia) Issam Jemâa	1	0	0
=	(Tunisia) Hamdi Harbaoui	2	0	0
=	(Tunisia) Jawhar Mnari	1	0	0
=	(Zambia) Kenneth Malitoli	5	0	0
=	(Tunisia) Khalil Chemmam	2	0	0
=	(Tunisia) Ben Mrad	1	0	0
=	(Tunisia) Naoufel Youssefi	1	0	0
=	(Tunisia) Kamel Zaiem	1	0	0

P	Player	Arab Club Champions Cup	Afro-Asian Club Championship	Arab Super Cup
=	(Tunisia) Khaled Ayari	1	0	0
=	(Tunisia) Khaled Badra	1	0	0
=	(Ivory Coast) Oussou Konan Anicet	1	0	0
=	(Tunisia) Zine El Abidine Souissi	1	0	0
=	(Nigeria) Mickael Eneramo	4	0	0
=	(Tunisia) Farid Matri	1	0	0
=	(Tunisia) Haythem Jouini	1	0	0
=	(Tunisia) Ghailene Chaalali	1	0	0
=	(Tunisia) Khalil Chemmam	2	0	0
=	(Cameroon) Franck Kom	1	0	0
=	(Tunisia) Zoubeir Boughnia	1	0	0
=	(Tunisia) Saad Bguir	2	0	0
=	(Tunisia) Chamseddine Dhaouadi	1	0	0

P	Player	Arab Club Champions Cup	Afro-Asian Club Championship	Arab Super Cup
=	(Tunisia) Abdelmajid Gobantini	1	0	0
=	(Tunisia) Lotfi Laroussi	1	0	0
=	(Tunisia) Ayadi Hamrouni	6	1	1
=	(Tunisia) Nabil Maâloul	4	0	0
=	(Tunisia) Ali Ben Neji	4	0	0
=	(Tunisia) Taha Yassine Khenissi	4	0	0
=	(Nigeria) Othmane Amando	4	0	0
=	(Tunisia) Hassan Feddou	3	0	0
=	(Tunisia) Bessam Jridi	3	0	0
=	(Tunisia) Tarek Thabet	4	0	1
=	(Algeria) Youcef Belaïli	1	0	0
=	(Cameroon) Henri Bienvenu	2	0	0
=	(Tunisia) Syam Ben Youssef	1	0	0
=	(Tunisia) Iskandar Al Sheikh	1	0	0
=	(Tunisia) Bilel Mejri	1	0	0
=	(Algeria) Abdelkader Bedrane	1	0	0
=	(Libya) Hamdou Elhouni	1	0	0
=	(Ghana) Kwame Bonsu	1	0	0
