= 2025 CAF Champions League final =

African football tournament final

- Event: 2024–25 CAF Champions League
Mamelodi Sundowns	Pyramids
(South Africa)	(Egypt)
2	3

First leg
Mamelodi Sundowns	Pyramids
1	1
- Date: 24 May 2025
- Venue: Loftus Versfeld Stadium, Pretoria
- Referee: Mahmood Ismail (Sudan)
- Attendance: 50,000
- Weather: Sunny; 19 °C (66 °F); 51% humidity

Second leg
Pyramids	Mamelodi Sundowns
2	1
- Date: 1 June 2025
- Venue: 30 June Stadium, Cairo
- Referee: Omar Artan (Somalia)
- Attendance: 25,000
- Weather: Clear weather 27 °C (81 °F); 43% humidity

The 2025 CAF Champions League final were the final matches of the 2024–25 CAF Champions League, the 61st edition of Africa's premier club football tournament organized by the Confederation of African Football (CAF), and the 29th edition under the current CAF Champions League title.

Pyramids defeated Mamelodi Sundowns 3-2 on aggregate to win their first CAF Champions League title.

== Teams ==
In the following table, finals until 1996 were in the African Cup of Champions Club era, since 1997 were in the CAF Champions League era.

Team	Zone	Previous finals appearances (bold indicates winners)
(South Africa) Mamelodi Sundowns	COSAFA (Southern Africa)	2 (2001, **2016**)
(Egypt) Pyramids	UNAF (North Africa)	none

== Venues ==
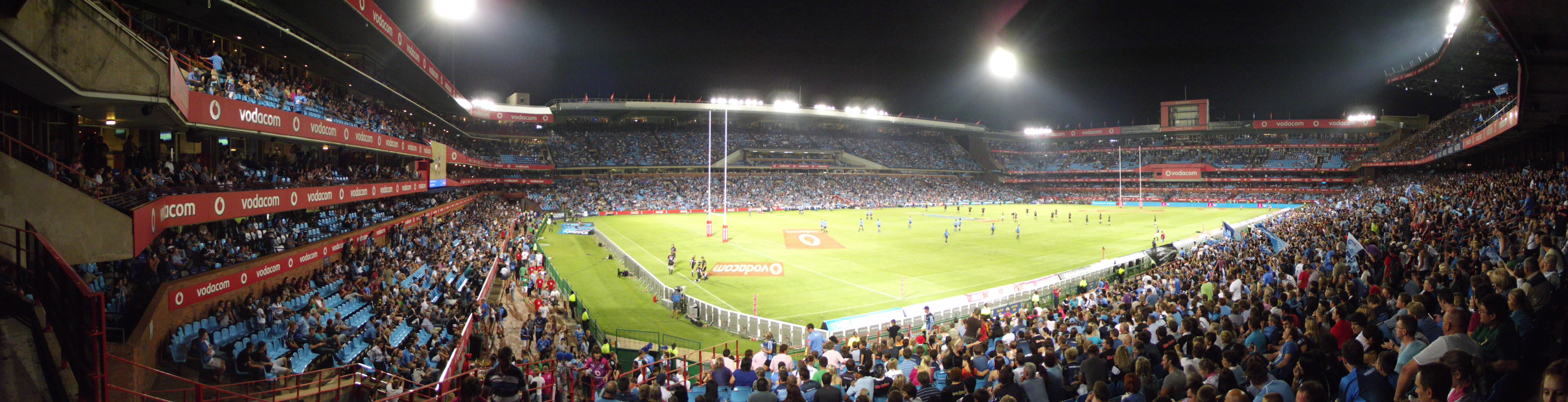
Loftus Versfeld Stadium in Pretoria, South Africa, hosted the first leg.

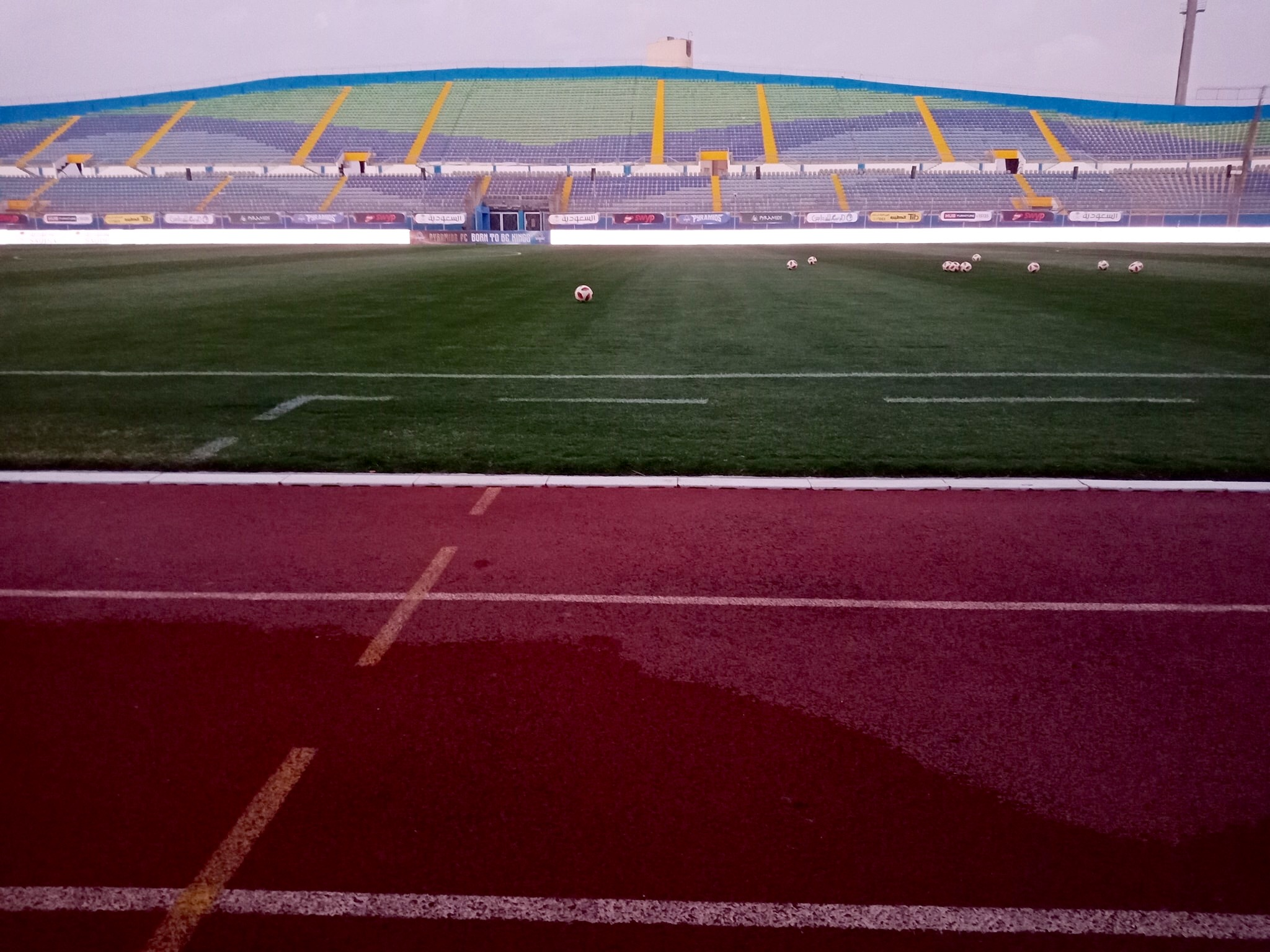
30 June Stadium in Cairo, Egypt, hosted the second leg.

== Road to the final ==
Note: In all results below, the score of the finalist is given first (H: home; A: away).

(South Africa) Mamelodi Sundowns				Round	(Egypt) Pyramids			
Opponent	Agg	1st leg	2nd leg	Qualifying rounds	Opponent	Agg	1st leg	2nd leg
Bye				First round	(Tanzania) JKU	9–1	6–0 (A)	3–1 (H)
(Eswatini) Mbabane Swallows	8–0	4–0 (A)	4–0 (H)	Second round	(Rwanda) APR	4–2	1–1 (A)	3–1 (H)
Opponent	Result			Group stage	Opponent	Result		
(Democratic Republic of the Congo) AS Maniema Union	0–0 (H)			Matchday 1	(Angola) Sagrada Esperança	5–1 (H)		
(Morocco) AS FAR	1–1 (A)			Matchday 2	(Mali) Djoliba	0–0 (A)		
(Morocco) Raja CA	1–0 (H)			Matchday 3	(Tunisia) Espérance de Tunis	0–2 (A)		
(Morocco) Raja CA	0–1 (A)			Matchday 4	(Tunisia) Espérance de Tunis	2–1 (H)		
(Democratic Republic of the Congo) AS Maniema Union	2–1 (A)			Matchday 5	(Angola) Sagrada Esperança	1–0 (A)		
(Morocco) AS FAR	1–1 (H)			Matchday 6	(Mali) Djoliba	6–0 (H)		
**Group B runners-up**: Pos / Team / Pld / Pts; 1 / (Morocco) AS FAR / 6 / **10**; **2** / (South Africa) Mamelodi Sundowns / **6** / **9**; 3 / (Morocco) Raja CA / 6 / **8**; 4 / (Democratic Republic of the Congo) AS Maniema Union / 6 / **3**; Source: CAF				Final standings	**Group D runners-up**: Pos / Team / Pld / Pts; 1 / (Tunisia) Espérance de Tunis / 6 / **13**; **2** / (Egypt) Pyramids / **6** / **13**; 3 / (Angola) Sagrada Esperança / 6 / **5**; 4 / (Mali) Djoliba / 6 / **2**; Source: CAF			
Opponent	Agg	1st leg	2nd leg	Knockout stage	Opponent	Agg	1st leg	2nd leg
(Tunisia) Espérance de Tunis	1–0	1–0 (H)	0–0 (A)	Quarter-finals	(Morocco) AS FAR	4–3	4–1 (H)	0–2 (A)
(Egypt) Al Ahly	1–1 (a)	0–0 (H)	1–1 (A)	Semi-finals	(South Africa) Orlando Pirates	3–2	0–0 (A)	3–2 (H)

== Format ==
The final was played on a home-and-away two-legged basis.

If the aggregate score was tied after the second leg, the away goals rule was applied, and if still tied, extra time was not played, and a penalty shoot-out was used to determine the winner.

== Matches ==
=== First leg ===
==== Details ====
24 May 2025
15:00 UTC+2

Mamelodi Sundowns (South Africa)	1–1	(Egypt) Pyramids
Ribeiro 54'	Report	El Karti 90+4'

Loftus Versfeld Stadium, Pretoria
Attendance: 50,000
Referee: Mahmood Ismail (Sudan)

**Mamelodi Sundowns**	**Pyramids**

GK	30	(South Africa) Ronwen Williams (c)
DF	5	(South Africa) Mosa Lebusa
DF	20	(South Africa) Grant Kekana
DF	25	(South Africa) Khuliso Mudau
DF	6	(South Africa) Aubrey Modiba
MF	4	(South Africa) Teboho Mokoena
MF	11	(Chile) Marcelo Allende
FW	10	(Brazil) Lucas Ribeiro	(substituted off) 84'
FW	17	(South Africa) Tashreeq Matthews	(substituted off) 37'
FW	9	(Brazil) Arthur Sales	(substituted off) 78'
FW	13	(South Africa) Iqraam Rayners	(substituted off) 78'
Substitutes:
GK	1	(Uganda) Denis Onyango
DF	27	(South Africa) Thapelo Morena	(substituted on) 84'
DF	29	(Zimbabwe) Divine Lunga
MF	12	(South Africa) Neo Maema	(substituted on) 78'
MF	15	(South Africa) Bathusi Aubaas
MF	18	(South Africa) Themba Zwane
MF	26	(South Africa) Jayden Adams	(substituted on) 37'
MF	34	(South Africa) Mothobi Mvala
FW	38	(Namibia) Peter Shalulile	(substituted on) 78'
Manager:
(Portugal) Miguel Cardoso

GK	1	(Egypt) Ahmed El Shenawy (c)
DF	3	(Egypt) Mahmoud Marei
DF	4	(Egypt) Ahmed Samy
DF	15	(Morocco) Mohamed Chibi
DF	21	(Egypt) Mohamed Hamdy
MF	7	(Burkina Faso) Blati Touré
MF	14	(Egypt) Mohanad Lasheen
MF	18	(Morocco) Walid El Karti
FW	30	(Egypt) Ibrahim Adel		(substituted off) 88'
FW	31	(Egypt) Ahmed Atef	(yellow card) 47'	(substituted off) 80'
FW	9	(Democratic Republic of the Congo) Fiston Mayele		(substituted off) 88'
Substitutes:
GK	22	(Egypt) Sherif Ekramy
DF	5	(Egypt) Ali Gabr
DF	12	(Egypt) Ahmed Tawfik
DF	29	(Egypt) Karim Hafez		(substituted on) 88'
MF	13	(Egypt) Mahmoud Dunga
MF	27	(Egypt) Youssef Obama
FW	10	(Egypt) Ramadan Sobhi		(substituted on) 80'
FW	33	(Egypt) Marwan Hamdy		(substituted on) 88'
FW	35	(Egypt) Abdel Rahman Magdy
Manager:
(Croatia) Krunoslav Jurčić

Assistant referees:
Mohammed Ibrahim (Sudan)
Ahmed Abdel Razek (Djibouti)
Fourth official:
Pacifique Ndabihawenimana (Burundi)
Video assistant referee:
Daniel Nii Laryea (Ghana)
Assistant video assistant referees:
Salima Mukansanga (Rwanda)
Gabriel Camara (Senegal)

**Match rules**
- 90 minutes.
- Nine named substitutes, of which up to five may be used. (Note: Each team was only given three opportunities to make substitutions, excluding substitutions made at half-time.)

==== Statistics ====
First half
Statistic	Mamelodi Sundowns	Pyramids
Goals scored	0	0
Total shots	5	4
Shots on target	1	1
Saves	1	1
Ball possession	61%	39%
Corner kicks	2	2
Offsides	0	2
Yellow cards	0	0
Red cards	0	0

Second half
Statistic	Mamelodi Sundowns	Pyramids
Goals scored	1	1
Total shots	4	6
Shots on target	1	2
Saves	1	0
Ball possession	57%	43%
Corner kicks	1	1
Offsides	1	2
Yellow cards	0	1
Red cards	0	0

Overall
Statistic	Mamelodi Sundowns	Pyramids
Goals scored	1	1
Total shots	9	10
Shots on target	2	3
Saves	2	1
Ball possession	59%	41%
Corner kicks	3	3
Offsides	1	4
Yellow cards	0	1
Red cards	0	0

=== Second leg ===
==== Details ====
1 June 2025
20:00 UTC+3

Pyramids (Egypt)	2–1	(South Africa) Mamelodi Sundowns
Mayele 23'; Samy 56'	Report	Rayners 75'

30 June Stadium, Cairo
Attendance: 25,000
Referee: Omar Artan (Somalia)

**Pyramids**	**Mamelodi Sundowns**

GK	1	(Egypt) Ahmed El Shenawy (c)
DF	3	(Egypt) Mahmoud Marei
DF	4	(Egypt) Ahmed Samy
DF	15	(Morocco) Mohamed Chibi	(yellow card) 38'	(substituted off) 89'
DF	21	(Egypt) Mohamed Hamdy
MF	7	(Burkina Faso) Blati Touré		(substituted off) 90+2'
MF	14	(Egypt) Mohanad Lasheen
MF	18	(Morocco) Walid El Karti
FW	10	(Egypt) Ramadan Sobhi		(substituted off) 78'
FW	31	(Egypt) Ahmed Atef Otta	(yellow card) 26'
FW	9	(Democratic Republic of the Congo) Fiston Mayele
Substitutes:
GK	22	(Egypt) Sherif Ekramy
DF	5	(Egypt) Ali Gabr		(substituted on) 90+2'
DF	12	(Egypt) Ahmed Tawfik		(substituted on) 89'
DF	29	(Egypt) Karim Hafez
MF	27	(Egypt) Youssef Obama
FW	11	(Egypt) Mostafa Fathi
FW	30	(Egypt) Ibrahim Adel		(substituted on) 78'
FW	33	(Egypt) Marwan Hamdy
FW	35	(Egypt) Abdel Rahman Magdy
Manager:
(Croatia) Krunoslav Jurčić

GK	30	(South Africa) Ronwen Williams (c)
DF	5	(South Africa) Mosa Lebusa		(substituted off) 64'
DF	20	(South Africa) Grant Kekana
DF	25	(South Africa) Khuliso Mudau
DF	6	(South Africa) Aubrey Modiba	(yellow card) 26'	(substituted off) 46'
MF	4	(South Africa) Teboho Mokoena	(yellow card) 69'
MF	26	(South Africa) Jayden Adams		(substituted off) 64'
MF	11	(Chile) Marcelo Allende
FW	10	(Brazil) Lucas Ribeiro
FW	17	(South Africa) Tashreeq Matthews		(substituted off) 64'
FW	13	(South Africa) Iqraam Rayners		(substituted off) 78'
Substitutes:
GK	1	(Uganda) Denis Onyango
DF	27	(South Africa) Thapelo Morena		(substituted on) 64'
DF	29	(Zimbabwe) Divine Lunga		(substituted on) 46'
MF	15	(South Africa) Bathusi Aubaas
MF	18	(South Africa) Themba Zwane
MF	34	(South Africa) Mothobi Mvala
FW	9	(Brazil) Arthur Sales		(substituted on) 64'
FW	35	(South Africa) Lebo Mothiba		(substituted on) 78'
FW	38	(Namibia) Peter Shalulile		(substituted on) 64'
Manager:
(Portugal) Miguel Cardoso

Assistant referees:
Gilbert Cheruiyot (Kenya)
Stephen Yiembe (Kenya)
Fourth official:
Djindo Louis Houngnandande (Benin)
Video assistant referee:
Bamlak Tessema Weyesa (Ethiopia)
Assistant video assistant referees:
Abd Al Aziz Yasir (Sudan)
Carine Atezambong Fomo (Cameroon)

**Match rules**
- 90 minutes.
- Penalty shoot-out if tied on aggregate and away goals.
- Nine named substitutes, of which up to five may be used.

==== Statistics ====
First half
Statistic	Pyramids	Mamelodi Sundowns
Goals scored	1	0
Total shots	6	5
Shots on target	3	1
Saves	1	2
Ball possession	39%	61%
Corner kicks	2	1
Offsides	1	0
Yellow cards	2	1
Red cards	0	0

Second half
Statistic	Pyramids	Mamelodi Sundowns
Goals scored	1	1
Total shots	4	5
Shots on target	1	3
Saves	2	0
Ball possession	33%	67%
Corner kicks	0	6
Offsides	2	1
Yellow cards	0	1
Red cards	0	0

Overall
Statistic	Pyramids	Mamelodi Sundowns
Goals scored	2	1
Total shots	10	10
Shots on target	4	4
Saves	3	2
Ball possession	36%	64%
Corner kicks	2	7
Offsides	3	1
Yellow cards	2	2
Red cards	0	0

== See also ==
- 2025 CAF Confederation Cup final
- 2025 CAF Super Cup
