= 2024–25 CAF Champions League qualifying rounds =

- Dates: 16 August – 22 September 2024

Tournament statistics
- Matches played: 85
- Goals scored: 194 (2.28 per match)

The 2024–25 CAF Champions League qualifying rounds began on 16 August and ended on 22 September 2024. 59 teams competed in the qualifying rounds to decide the 16 places in the group stage of the 2024–25 CAF Champions League.

All times are local.

== Draw ==
The draw for the qualifying rounds was held on 11 July 2024, 12:00 GMT (15:00 local time, UTC+3), at the CAF headquarters in Cairo, Egypt.

The entry round of the 59 teams entered into the draw was determined by their performances in the CAF competitions for the previous five seasons (CAF 5-year ranking points shown in parentheses).

Entry round	Second round (5 teams)	First round (54 teams)
Teams	(Egypt) Al Ahly (87 pts); (Tunisia) Espérance de Tunis (61 pts); (South Africa) Mamelodi Sundowns (54 pts); (Angola) Petro de Luanda (39 pts); (Democratic Republic of the Congo) TP Mazembe (38 pts)	(Algeria) CR Belouizdad (37 pts); (Morocco) Raja CA (35 pts); (Tanzania) Young Africans (31 pts); (Egypt) Pyramids (29 pts); (Sudan) Al Hilal (25 pts); (South Africa) Orlando Pirates (16 pts); (Sudan) Al Merrikh (9 pts); (Angola) Sagrada Esperança (8 pts); (Botswana) Jwaneng Galaxy (8 pts); (Morocco) AS FAR (8 pts); (Tunisia) US Monastir (8 pts); (Algeria) MC Alger (6 pts); (Togo) ASKO Kara (4 pts); (Libya) Al Nasr (2 pts) (Note: Libyan teams were listed as Libya 1 and Libya 2 during the draw; as their identity was still unknown by the time of the draw.); (Senegal) Teungueth (2 pts); (Libya) Al Ahly Benghazi (1 pt); (Mali) Djoliba (1 pt); (Nigeria) Enugu Rangers (1 pt); (Ivory Coast) San Pédro (0.5 pts); (Benin) Coton FC; (Burkina Faso) AS Douanes; (Burundi) Vital'O; (Cameroon) Victoria United; (Central African Republic) Red Star de Bangui; (Chad) AS PSI; (Comoros) US Zilimadjou; (Republic of the Congo) AC Léopards; (Djibouti) Arta Solar; (Democratic Republic of the Congo) AS Maniema Union; (Equatorial Guinea) Deportivo Mongomo; (Eswatini) Mbabane Swallows; (Ethiopia) CBE; (Ghana) Samartex; (Guinea) Milo; (Ivory Coast) Stade d'Abidjan; (Kenya) Gor Mahia; (Liberia) Watanga; (Madagascar) Disciples FC; (Malawi) Nyasa Big Bullets; (Mauritania) FC Nouadhibou; (Mozambique) Ferroviário da Beira; (Namibia) African Stars; (Niger) AS GNN; (Nigeria) Remo Stars; (Rwanda) APR; (Seychelles) Saint Louis Suns United; (Sierra Leone) Bo Rangers; (Somalia) Dekedaha; (South Sudan) Al Merreikh Bentiu; (Tanzania) Azam; (Uganda) SC Villa; (Zambia) Red Arrows; (Zanzibar) JKU; (Zimbabwe) Ngezi Platinum

== Format ==
In the qualifying rounds, each tie was played on a home-and-away two-legged basis. If the aggregate score was tied after the second leg, the away goals rule was applied, and if still tied, extra time was not played, and a penalty shoot-out was used to determine the winner (Regulations III. 13 & 14).

== Schedule ==
The schedule of the competition was as follows.

Schedule for the 2024–25 CAF Champions League qualifying rounds
Round	Draw date	First leg	Second leg
First round	11 July 2024	16–18 August 2024	23–25 August 2024
Second round	11 July 2024	13–15 September 2024	20–22 September 2024

== Bracket ==
The bracket of the draw was announced by the CAF on 11 July 2024. The 16 winners of the second round advanced to the group stage.

First round					Second round
1	(South Sudan) Al Merreikh Bentiu	1	1	2
4	(Kenya) Gor Mahia	0	5	5
4	(Kenya) Gor Mahia	0	5	5	(Kenya) Gor Mahia	0	0	0
					(Egypt) Al Ahly	3	3	6

First round					Second round
1	(Djibouti) Arta Solar	0	4	4
4	(Somalia) Dekedaha	2	3	5
4	(Somalia) Dekedaha	2	3	5	(Somalia) Dekedaha	1	0	1
					(Tunisia) Espérance de Tunis	4	8	12

First round
1	(Uganda) SC Villa	1	1	2
4	(Ethiopia) CBE	2	1	3
3	(Burundi) Vital'O	0	0	0
2	(Tanzania) Young Africans	4	6	10

Second round
(Ethiopia) CBE	0	0	0
(Tanzania) Young Africans	1	6	7

First round
1	(Tanzania) Azam	1	0	1
4	(Rwanda) APR	0	2	2
3	(Zanzibar) JKU	0	1	1
2	(Egypt) Pyramids	6	3	9

Second round
(Rwanda) APR	1	1	2
(Egypt) Pyramids	1	3	4

First round					Second round
1	(Eswatini) Mbabane Swallows	1	0	1
4	(Mozambique) Ferroviário da Beira	0	0	0
4	(Mozambique) Ferroviário da Beira	0	0	0	(Eswatini) Mbabane Swallows	0	0	0
					(South Africa) Mamelodi Sundowns	4	4	8

First round					Second round
1	(Zimbabwe) Ngezi Platinum	0	0	0 (3)
4	(Democratic Republic of the Congo) AS Maniema Union (p)	0	0	0 (4)
4	(Democratic Republic of the Congo) AS Maniema Union (p)	0	0	0 (4)	(Democratic Republic of the Congo) AS Maniema Union	2	0	2
					(Angola) Petro de Luanda	1	0	1

First round					Second round
1	(Malawi) Nyasa Big Bullets	2	0	2
4	(Zambia) Red Arrows	1	2	3
4	(Zambia) Red Arrows	1	2	3	(Zambia) Red Arrows	0	1	1
					(Democratic Republic of the Congo) TP Mazembe	2	2	4

First round
1	(Namibia) African Stars	1	0	1 (5)
4	(Botswana) Jwaneng Galaxy (p)	0	1	1 (6)
3	(Madagascar) Disciples FC	0	0	0
2	(South Africa) Orlando Pirates	0	4	4

Second round
(Botswana) Jwaneng Galaxy	0	0	0
(South Africa) Orlando Pirates	2	1	3

First round
1	(Comoros) US Zilimadjou	0	1	1
4	(Nigeria) Enugu Rangers	1	1	2
3	(Seychelles) Saint Louis Suns United	0	0	0
2	(Angola) Sagrada Esperança	1	3	4

Second round
(Nigeria) Enugu Rangers	1	1	2
(Angola) Sagrada Esperança	0	3	3

First round
1	(Burkina Faso) AS Douanes (a)	0	1	1
4	(Benin) Coton FC	0	1	1
3	(Republic of the Congo) AC Léopards	0	0	0
2	(Algeria) CR Belouizdad	2	1	3

Second round
(Burkina Faso) AS Douanes	1	0	0 (3)
(Algeria) CR Belouizdad (p)	0	1	1 (4)

First round
1	(Cameroon) Victoria United	0	0	0
4	(Ghana) Samartex	1	1	2
3	(Niger) AS GNN	1	0	1
2	(Morocco) Raja CA	2	5	7

Second round
(Ghana) Samartex	2	0	2
(Morocco) Raja CA	2	2	4

First round
1	(Chad) AS PSI	0	0	0
4	(Tunisia) US Monastir	1	2	3
3	(Liberia) Watanga	0	0	0
2	(Algeria) MC Alger	2	2	4

Second round
(Tunisia) US Monastir	1	0	1
(Algeria) MC Alger	0	2	2

First round
1	(Central African Republic) Red Star de Bangui	0	—	—
4	(Mali) Djoliba	0	—	w/o
3	(Equatorial Guinea) Deportivo Mongomo	2	0	2
2	(Togo) ASKO Kara	2	1	3

Second round
(Mali) Djoliba	1	1	2
(Togo) ASKO Kara	0	0	0

First round
1	(Ivory Coast) Stade d'Abidjan (p)	1	1	2 (5)
4	(Senegal) Teungueth	1	1	2 (4)
3	(Guinea) Milo (a)	0	1	1
2	(Mauritania) FC Nouadhibou	0	1	1

Second round
(Ivory Coast) Stade d'Abidjan	2	1	3
(Guinea) Milo	0	2	2

First round
1	(Sierra Leone) Bo Rangers	1	0	1
4	(Ivory Coast) San Pédro	1	1	2
3	(Libya) Al Ahly Benghazi	0	1	1
2	(Sudan) Al Hilal	1	1	2

Second round
(Ivory Coast) San Pédro	2	0	2
(Sudan) Al Hilal	2	1	3

First round
1	(Libya) Al Nasr	0	0	0
4	(Sudan) Al Merrikh	0	2	2
3	(Nigeria) Remo Stars	2	0	2
2	(Morocco) AS FAR	1	2	3

Second round
(Sudan) Al Merrikh	2	0	2
(Morocco) AS FAR	2	2	4

== First round ==
The first round, also called the first preliminary round, included the 54 teams that did not receive byes to the second round.

Team 1	Agg.	Team 2	1st leg	2nd leg
El Merriekh Bentiu (South Sudan)	2–5	(Kenya) Gor Mahia	1–0	1–5
Arta Solar (Djibouti)	4–5	(Somalia) Dekedaha	0–2	4–3
SC Villa (Uganda)	2–3	(Ethiopia) CBE	1–2	1–1
Vital'O (Burundi)	0–10	(Tanzania) Young Africans	0–4	0–6
Azam (Tanzania)	1–2	(Rwanda) APR	1–0	0–2
JKU (Zanzibar)	1–9	(Egypt) Pyramids	0–6	1–3
Mbabane Swallows (Eswatini)	1–0	(Mozambique) Ferroviário da Beira	1–0	0–0
Ngezi Platinum (Zimbabwe)	0–0 (3–4 p)	(Democratic Republic of the Congo) AS Maniema Union	0–0	0–0
Nyasa Big Bullets (Malawi)	2–3	(Zambia) Red Arrows	2–1	0–2
African Stars (Namibia)	1–1 (5–6 p)	(Botswana) Jwaneng Galaxy	1–0	0–1
Disciples FC (Madagascar)	0–4	(South Africa) Orlando Pirates	0–0	0–4
US Zilimadjou (Comoros)	1–2	(Nigeria) Enugu Rangers	0–1	1–1
Saint Louis Suns United (Seychelles)	0–4	(Angola) Sagrada Esperança	0–1	0–3
AS Douanes (Burkina Faso)	1–1 (a)	(Benin) Coton FC	0–0	1–1
AC Léopards (Republic of the Congo)	0–3	(Algeria) CR Belouizdad	0–2	0–1
Victoria United (Cameroon)	0–2	(Ghana) Samartex	0–1	0–1
AS GNN (Niger)	1–7	(Morocco) Raja CA	1–2	0–5
AS PSI (Chad)	0–3	(Tunisia) US Monastir	0–1	0–2
Watanga (Liberia)	0–4	(Algeria) MC Alger	0–2	0–2
Red Star de Bangui (Central African Republic)	w/o (Note: Djoliba won on a walkover after Red Star de Bangui withdrew from the competition citing financial reasons.)	(Mali) Djoliba	0–0	—
Deportivo Mongomo (Equatorial Guinea)	2–3	(Togo) ASKO Kara	2–2	0–1
Stade d'Abidjan (Ivory Coast)	2–2 (5–4 p)	(Senegal) Teungueth	1–1	1–1
Milo (Guinea)	1–1 (a)	(Mauritania) FC Nouadhibou	0–0	1–1
Bo Rangers (Sierra Leone)	1–2	(Ivory Coast) San Pédro	1–1	0–1
Al Ahly Benghazi (Libya)	1–2	(Sudan) Al Hilal	0–1	1–1
Al Nasr (Libya)	0–2	(Sudan) Al Merrikh	0–0	0–2
Remo Stars (Nigeria)	2–3	(Morocco) AS FAR	2–1	0–2

Notes:

18 August 2024
15:00 UTC+2

El Merriekh Bentiu (South Sudan)	1–0	(Kenya) Gor Mahia
Elfaki 64'	Report

Juba Stadium, Juba
Referee: Keren Yocette (Seychelles)
25 August 2024
15:00 UTC+3

Gor Mahia (Kenya)	5–1	(South Sudan) Al Merreikh Bentiu
Ochieng Oduor 11'; A. Onyango 21'; Omija 35'; R. Onyango 80', 90'	Report	Akinbinu 7'

Nyayo National Stadium, Nairobi
Referee: Julian Nii Akwa Nunoo (Ghana)

Gor Mahia won 5–2 on aggregate.

16 August 2024
18:00 UTC+3

Arta Solar (Djibouti)	0–2	(Somalia) Dekedaha
	Report	Adan 17'; Bilal 31'

Azam Complex Stadium, Dar es Salaam (Tanzania)
Referee: Brighton Chimene (Zimbabwe)
23 August 2024
19:00 UTC+3

Dekedaha (Somalia)	3–4	(Djibouti) Arta Solar
Adepoju 11', 90+1' (pen.); Adan 32'	Report	Dadzie 1', 81', 83'; Fahmi 30'

Azam Complex Stadium, Dar es Salaam (Tanzania)
Referee: Clement Franklin Kpan (Ivory Coast)

Dekedaha won 5–4 on aggregate.

17 August 2024
16:00 UTC+3

SC Villa (Uganda)	1–2	(Ethiopia) CBE
Ngonde 69'	Report	Piter 20'; Gidey 55'

Mandela National Stadium, Kampala
Referee: Hillary Hambaba (Zambia)
24 August 2024
15:00 UTC+3

CBE (Ethiopia)	1–1	(Uganda) SC Villa
Hamid 64'	Report	Kakande 78' (pen.)

Abebe Bikila Stadium, Addis Ababa

CBE won 3–2 on aggregate.

17 August 2024
16:00 UTC+3

Vital'O (Burundi)	0–4	(Tanzania) Young Africans
	Report	Dube 6'; Chama 69'; Mzize 74'; Aziz Ki 90'

Azam Complex Stadium, Dar es Salaam (Tanzania)
Referee: Moussa Diou (Mauritania)
24 August 2024
19:00 UTC+3

Young Africans (Tanzania)	6–0	(Burundi) Vital'O
Zouzoua 14' (pen.); Mzize 48'; Chama 52'; Dube 72'; Aziz Ki 80'; Yahya 87'	Report

Azam Complex Stadium, Dar es Salaam

Young Africans won 10–0 on aggregate.

18 August 2024
18:00 UTC+3

Azam (Tanzania)	1–0	(Rwanda) APR
Blanco 57' (pen.)	Report

Azam Complex Stadium, Dar es Salaam
Referee: Thulani Sibandze (Eswatini)
24 August 2024
18:00 UTC+2

APR (Rwanda)	2–0	(Tanzania) Azam
Ruboneka 45'; Mugisha 62'	Report

Amahoro Stadium, Kigali

APR won 2–1 on aggregate.

18 August 2024
20:00 UTC+3

JKU (Zanzibar)	0–6	(Egypt) Pyramids
	Report	Mayele 8'; El Karti 13'; Lasheen 25', 55'; Adel 31'; Zalaka 87'

30 June Stadium, Cairo (Egypt)
Referee: Mohamed Ali Moussa (Niger)
24 August 2024
20:00 UTC+3

Pyramids (Egypt)	3–1	(Zanzibar) JKU
Saber 54'; El Gabbas 70'; Lakay 74'	Report	Simba 57'

30 June Stadium, Cairo

Pyramids won 9–1 on aggregate.

16 August 2024
19:00 UTC+2

Mbabane Swallows (Eswatini)	1–0	(Mozambique) Ferroviário da Beira
Madja 46'	Report

Lucas Moripe Stadium, Pretoria (South Africa)
Referee: Ashebir Seboka Wordofa (Ethiopia)
25 August 2024
15:00 UTC+2

Ferroviário da Beira (Mozambique)	0–0	(Eswatini) Mbabane Swallows
	Report

Campo da ABB, Maputo
Referee: Joseph Odey Ogabor (Nigeria)

Mbabane Swallows won 1–0 on aggregate.

17 August 2024
15:00 UTC+2

Ngezi Platinum (Zimbabwe)	0–0	(Democratic Republic of the Congo) AS Maniema Union
	Report

National Heroes Stadium, Lusaka (Zambia)
Referee: Aldair Lopes (Guinea-Bissau)
25 August 2024
15:30 UTC+1

AS Maniema Union (Democratic Republic of the Congo)	0–0	(Zimbabwe) Ngezi Platinum
	Report
Penalties
	4–3

Stade des Martyrs, Kinshasa
Referee: Peter Waweru (Kenya)

0–0 on aggregate. AS Maniema Union won 4–3 on penalties.

18 August 2024
15:00 UTC+2

Nyasa Big Bullets (Malawi)	2–1	(Zambia) Red Arrows
Adebare Babatunde 78'; Phiri 83'	Report	Banda 57'

Bingu National Stadium, Lilongwe
Referee: Abdou Abdel Mefire (Cameroon)
24 August 2024
15:00 UTC+2

Red Arrows (Zambia)	2–0	(Malawi) Nyasa Big Bullets
Phiri 71'; Katema 86'	Report

National Heroes Stadium, Lusaka
Referee: Amir Loussif (Tunisia)

Red Arrows won 3–2 on aggregate.

17 August 2024
15:00 UTC+2

African Stars (Namibia)	1–0	(Botswana) Jwaneng Galaxy
Stephanus 6'	Report

Botswana National Stadium, Gaborone (Botswana)
24 August 2024
16:00 UTC+2

Jwaneng Galaxy (Botswana)	1–0	(Namibia) African Stars
Kebatho 69'	Report
Penalties
	6–5

Botswana National Stadium, Gaborone
Referee: Bertrand Manirakiza (Burundi)

1–1 on aggregate. Jwaneng Galaxy won 6–5 on penalties.

18 August 2024
15:00 UTC+4

Disciples FC (Madagascar)	0–0	(South Africa) Orlando Pirates
	Report

Stade de Cote d'Or, Saint Pierre (Mauritius)
Referee: Pousri Armi Alfred (Chad)
23 August 2024
19:30 UTC+2

Orlando Pirates (South Africa)	4–0	(Madagascar) Disciples FC
Monyane 9'; Mofokeng 25'; Maswanganyi 28'; Kimvuidi 90'	Report

Orlando Stadium, Johannesburg
Referee: Ring Nyier Akech Malong (South Sudan)

Orlando Pirates won 4–0 on aggregate.

18 August 2024
15:00 UTC+1

US Zilimadjou (Comoros)	0–1	(Nigeria) Enugu Rangers
	Report	Uwumiro 21'

Godswill Akpabio International Stadium, Uyo (Nigeria)
23 August 2024
15:00 UTC+1

Enugu Rangers (Nigeria)	1–1	(Comoros) US Zilimadjou
Agu 79' (pen.)	Report	M. Youssouf 85'

Godswill Akpabio International Stadium, Uyo
Referee: Moses Forkpah (Liberia)

Enugu Rangers won 2–1 on aggregate.

17 August 2024
18:00 UTC+4

Saint Louis Suns United (Seychelles)	0–1	(Angola) Sagrada Esperança
	Report	Dala Sebastião 47'

Stade de Cote d'Or, Saint Pierre (Mauritius)
24 August 2024
15:30 UTC+1

Sagrada Esperança (Angola)	3–0	(Seychelles) Saint Louis Suns United
Mussa 7' (pen.), 68'; Celso 63'	Report

Estádio 11 de Novembro, Luanda

Sagrada Esperança won 4–0 on aggregate.

17 August 2024
16:00 UTC+0

AS Douanes (Burkina Faso)	0–0	(Benin) Coton FC
	Report

Stade du 26 Mars, Bamako (Mali)
Referee: Lotfi Bekouassa (Algeria)
25 August 2024
14:00 UTC+1

Coton FC (Benin)	1–1	(Burkina Faso) AS Douanes
Idriss 90'	Report	Sanou 18'

Stade de l'Amitié, Cotonou
Referee: Leonidas Lenine Da Graca (Cape Verde)

1–1 on aggregate. AS Douanes won on away goals.

18 August 2024
14:30 UTC+1

AC Léopards (Republic of the Congo)	0–2	(Algeria) CR Belouizdad
	Report	Boussouf 32'; Khacef 84'

Stade Alphonse Massemba-Débat, Brazzaville
Referee: Ousmane Diakate (Mali)
25 August 2024
20:00 UTC+1

CR Belouizdad (Algeria)	1–0	(Republic of the Congo) AC Léopards
Benguit 24'	Report

Mustapha Tchaker Stadium, Blida

CR Belouizdad won 3–0 on aggregate.

18 August 2024
15:00 UTC+1

Victoria United (Cameroon)	0–1	(Ghana) Samartex
	Report	Mamah 46'

Japoma Stadium, Douala
Referee: Saddam Houssein Mansour (Djibouti)
25 August 2024
15:00 UTC+0

Samartex (Ghana)	1–0	(Cameroon) Victoria United
Afful 8'	Report

Accra Sports Stadium, Accra

Samartex won 2–0 on aggregate.

17 August 2024
16:00 UTC+1

AS GNN (Niger)	1–2	(Morocco) Raja CA
Jules 37' (pen.)	Report	Bougrine 20'; Zila 66'

Stade Général Seyni Kountché, Niamey
Referee: Godfrey Nkhakananga (Malawi)
24 August 2024
20:00 UTC+1

Raja CA (Morocco)	5–0	(Niger) AS GNN
Zrida 28'; Zerhouni 33'; Boulacsoute 45+2'; Ennafati 54'; Bougrine 67'	Report

Larbi Zaouli Stadium, Casablanca
Referee: Abdoulaye Manet (Guinea)

Raja CA won 7–1 on aggregate.

18 August 2024
15:00 UTC+1

AS PSI (Chad)	0–1	(Tunisia) US Monastir
	Report	Zeguei 31'

Ahmadou Ahidjo Stadium, Yaoundé (Cameroon)
Referee: Alhaji Musa Kabia (Sierra Leone)
25 August 2024
17:00 UTC+1

US Monastir (Tunisia)	2–0	(Chad) AS PSI
Hadj Khalifa 28'; Ghorbel 90+2'	Report

Hammadi Agrebi Stadium, Tunis
Referee: Keabetswe Dintwa (Botswana)

US Monastir won 3–0 on aggregate.

18 August 2024
20:00 UTC+1

Watanga (Liberia)	0–2	(Algeria) MC Alger
	Report	Draoui 4'; Zunon 41'

Nelson Mandela Stadium, Algiers (Algeria)
Referee: Jose Asangono (Equatorial Guinea)
22 August 2024
20:00 UTC+1

MC Alger (Algeria)	2–0	(Liberia) Watanga
Bayazid 16'; Benhaoua 88'	Report

Mustapha Tchaker Stadium, Blida
Referee: Yannick Malala Kabanga (DR Congo)

MC Alger won 4–0 on aggregate.

17 August 2024
15:00 UTC+1

Red Star de Bangui (Central African Republic)	0–0	(Mali) Djoliba
	Report

Reunification Stadium, Douala (Cameroon)
Referee: Ahmed Arajiga (Tanzania)

Djoliba won on a walkover after Red Star de Bangui withdrew.

18 August 2024
15:00 UTC+1

Deportivo Mongomo (Equatorial Guinea)	2–2	(Togo) ASKO Kara
Nababa 25'; Diarra 64'	Report	Abalo 47'; Ayawotse 90'

Estadio de Mongomo, Mongomo
Referee: Jelly Chavani (South Africa)
25 August 2024
16:00 UTC+0

ASKO Kara (Togo)	1–0	(Equatorial Guinea) Deportivo Mongomo
Musah 7'	Report

Stade de Kégué, Lomé
Referee: Abdulrazg Ahmed (Libya)

ASKO Kara won 3–2 on aggregate.

17 August 2024
16:00 UTC+0

Stade d'Abidjan (Ivory Coast)	1–1	(Senegal) Teungueth
Guèye 90+4'	Report	Traoré 72' (o.g.)

Felix Houphouet Boigny Stadium, Abidjan
24 August 2024
17:00 UTC+0

Teungueth (Senegal)	1–1	(Ivory Coast) Stade d'Abidjan
Ciss 50'	Report	? 19'
Penalties
	4–5

Stade Lat-Dior, Thiès

2–2 on aggregate. Stade d'Abidjan won 5–4 on penalties.

16 August 2024
16:00 UTC+0

Milo (Guinea)	0–0	(Mauritania) FC Nouadhibou
	Report

Stade du 26 Mars, Bamako (Mali)
Referee: Jean Ouattara (Burkina Faso)
25 August 2024
17:00 UTC+0

FC Nouadhibou (Mauritania)	1–1	(Guinea) Milo
Bessam 5'	Report	Salia 15'

Stade Cheikha Ould Boïdiya, Nouakchott
Referee: Naim Hosni (Tunisia)

1–1 on aggregate. Milo won on away goals.

17 August 2024
16:00 UTC+0

Bo Rangers (Sierra Leone)	1–1	(Ivory Coast) San Pédro
M. Lamin 48'	Report	Dosso 73'

Bo Stadium, Bo
25 August 2024
16:00 UTC+0

San Pédro (Ivory Coast)	1–0	(Sierra Leone) Bo Rangers
Karamoko 80'	Report

Laurent Pokou Stadium, San Pédro

San Pédro won 2–1 on aggregate.

18 August 2024
19:00 UTC+2

Al Ahly Benghazi (Libya)	0–1	(Sudan) Al Hilal
	Report	Girumugisha 70'

Benina Martyrs Stadium, Benghazi
Referee: Aklesso Gnama (Togo)
25 August 2024
15:00 UTC+2

Al Hilal (Sudan)	1–1	(Libya) Al Ahly Benghazi
Khedr 77'	Report	Robia 14'

Juba Stadium, Juba (South Sudan)
Referee: Andofetra Rakotojaona (Madagascar)

Al Hilal won 2–1 on aggregate.

17 August 2024
21:30 UTC+2

Al Nasr (Libya)	0–0	(Sudan) Al Merrikh
	Report

Benina Martyrs Stadium, Benghazi
24 August 2024
15:00 UTC+2

Al Merrikh (Sudan)	2–0	(Libya) Al Nasr
Qabbani 45+2', 75'	Report

Juba Stadium, Juba (South Sudan)

Al Merrikh won 2–0 on aggregate.

18 August 2024
16:00 UTC+1

Remo Stars (Nigeria)	2–1	(Morocco) AS FAR
Junior 19'; Ismail 67'	Report	Beya 50'

Remo Stars Stadium, Sagamu
Referee: Mashood Ssali (Uganda)
25 August 2024
21:00 UTC+1

AS FAR (Morocco)	2–0	(Nigeria) Remo Stars
Beya 52'; Zouhzouh 80' (pen.)	Report

Moulay Hassan Stadium, Rabat

AS FAR won 3–2 on aggregate.

== Second round ==
The second round, also called the second preliminary round, included 32 teams: the 5 teams that received byes to this round, and the 27 winners of the first round.

Team 1	Agg.	Team 2	1st leg	2nd leg
Gor Mahia (Kenya)	0–6	(Egypt) Al Ahly	0–3	0–3
Dekedaha (Somalia)	1–12	(Tunisia) Espérance de Tunis	1–4	0–8
CBE (Ethiopia)	0–7	(Tanzania) Young Africans	0–1	0–6
APR (Rwanda)	2–4	(Egypt) Pyramids	1–1	1–3
Mbabane Swallows (Eswatini)	0–8	(South Africa) Mamelodi Sundowns	0–4	0–4
AS Maniema Union (Democratic Republic of the Congo)	2–1	(Angola) Petro de Luanda	2–1	0–0
Red Arrows (Zambia)	1–4	(Democratic Republic of the Congo) TP Mazembe	0–2	1–2
Jwaneng Galaxy (Botswana)	0–3	(South Africa) Orlando Pirates	0–2	0–1
Enugu Rangers (Nigeria)	2–3	(Angola) Sagrada Esperança	1–0	1–3
AS Douanes (Burkina Faso)	1–1 (3–4 p)	(Algeria) CR Belouizdad	1–0	0–1
Samartex (Ghana)	2–4	(Morocco) Raja CA	2–2	0–2
US Monastir (Tunisia)	1–2	(Algeria) MC Alger	1–0	0–2
Djoliba (Mali)	2–0	(Togo) ASKO Kara	1–0	1–0
Stade d'Abidjan (Ivory Coast)	3–2	(Guinea) Milo	2–0	1–2
San Pédro (Ivory Coast)	2–3	(Sudan) Al Hilal	2–2	0–1
Al Merrikh (Sudan)	2–4	(Morocco) AS FAR	2–2	0–2

15 September 2024
15:00 UTC+3

Gor Mahia (Kenya)	0–3	(Egypt) Al Ahly
	Report	Rabia 14'; Tau 15', 73'

Nyayo National Stadium, Nairobi
Referee: Stevie Jean Brandy Baillache (Mauritius)
21 September 2024
19:00 UTC+3

Al Ahly (Egypt)	3–0	(Kenya) Gor Mahia
Rabia 23'; Abou Ali 54'; Taher 90+1'	Report

Cairo International Stadium, Cairo
Referee: Jean-Jacques Ndala Ngambo (DR Congo)

Al Ahly won 6–0 on aggregate.

15 September 2024
17:00 UTC+1

Dekedaha (Somalia)	1–4	(Tunisia) Espérance de Tunis
Adepoju 45+2'	Report	Sasse 27'; Belaïli 50', 76'; Meriah 66'

Hammadi Agrebi Stadium, Tunis (Tunisia)
Referee: Boubou Traoré (Mali)
21 September 2024
19:00 UTC+1

Espérance de Tunis (Tunisia)	8–0	(Somalia) Dekedaha
Sasse 7'; Sowe 12'; Belaïli 18', 45', 51'; Tougai 69' (pen.); Derbali 74'; Jelassi 78'	Report

Hammadi Agrebi Stadium, Tunis
Referee: Aklesso Gnama (Togo)

Espérance de Tunis won 12–1 on aggregate.

14 September 2024
15:00 UTC+3

CBE (Ethiopia)	0–1	(Tanzania) Young Africans
	Report	Dube 45'

Abebe Bikila Stadium, Addis Ababa
Referee: Issa Sy (Senegal)
21 September 2024
19:30 UTC+2

Young Africans (Tanzania)	6–0	(Ethiopia) CBE
Chama 35'; Mzize 46'; Aziz Ki 75', 90+3'; Yahya 87'; Abuya 90+1'	Report

Amaan Stadium, Zanzibar
Referee: Abdel Aziz Mohamed Bouh (Mauritania)

Young Africans won 7–0 on aggregate.

14 September 2024
18:00 UTC+2

APR (Rwanda)	1–1	(Egypt) Pyramids
Chibi 50' (o.g.)	Report	Mayele 83'

Amahoro Stadium, Kigali
Referee: Daniel Nii Laryea (Ghana)
21 September 2024
21:00 UTC+3

Pyramids (Egypt)	3–1	(Rwanda) APR
Chibi 45'; Mayele 67'; Hafez 90+2' (pen.)	Report	Seidu 10'

30 June Stadium, Cairo
Referee: Alhadi Allaou Mahamat (Chad)

Pyramids won 4–2 on aggregate.

14 September 2024
20:00 UTC+2

Mbabane Swallows (Eswatini)	0–4	(South Africa) Mamelodi Sundowns
	Report	Ribeiro 3' (pen.), 53'; Lebusa 17'; Rayners 40'

Lucas Moripe Stadium, Pretoria (South Africa)
Referee: Omar Abdulkadir Artan (Somalia)
21 September 2024
18:00 UTC+2

Mamelodi Sundowns (South Africa)	4–0	(Eswatini) Mbabane Swallows
Kodisang 42'; Khoza 60'; Lorch 63'; Mkhulise 67'	Report

Lucas Moripe Stadium, Pretoria
Referee: Sadok Selmi (Tunisia)

Mamelodi Sundowns won 8–0 on aggregate.

14 September 2024
15:00 UTC+1

AS Maniema Union (Democratic Republic of the Congo)	2–1	(Angola) Petro de Luanda
Baisala 14'; Balako 90+3'	Report	Vidinho 71'

Stade des Martyrs, Kinshasa
Referee: Joseph Odey Ogabor (Nigeria)
21 September 2024
16:00 UTC+1

Petro de Luanda (Angola)	0–0	(Democratic Republic of the Congo) AS Maniema Union
	Report

Estádio 11 de Novembro, Luanda
Referee: Younoussa Tawel Camaea (Guinea)

AS Maniema Union won 2–1 on aggregate.

14 September 2024
15:00 UTC+2

Red Arrows (Zambia)	0–2	(Democratic Republic of the Congo) TP Mazembe
	Report	Kabwit 66'; Ngimbi 72'

Levy Mwanawasa Stadium, Ndola
Referee: Ahmed Arajiga (Tanzania)
21 September 2024
15:00 UTC+2

TP Mazembe (Democratic Republic of the Congo)	2–1	(Zambia) Red Arrows
Zemanga 10'; Ameka 84'	Report	Banda 74' (pen.)

Stade TP Mazembe, Lubumbashi
Referee: Jalal Jayed (Morocco)

Mazembe won 4–1 on aggregate.

14 September 2024
16:00 UTC+2

Jwaneng Galaxy (Botswana)	0–2	(South Africa) Orlando Pirates
	Report	Mabaso 45+3'; Hotto 77'

Botswana National Stadium, Gaborone
Referee: Jose Asangono (Equatorial Guinea)
21 September 2024
18:00 UTC+2

Orlando Pirates (South Africa)	1–0	(Botswana) Jwaneng Galaxy
Saleng 90+3'	Report

Orlando Stadium, Johannesburg
Referee: Adissa Ligali (Benin)

Orlando Pirates won 3–0 on aggregate.

13 September 2024
15:00 UTC+1

Enugu Rangers (Nigeria)	1–0	(Angola) Sagrada Esperança
Ogunleye 78'	Report

Godswill Akpabio International Stadium, Uyo
Referee: Lahlou Benbraham (Algeria)
22 September 2024
15:30 UTC+1

Sagrada Esperança (Angola)	3–1	(Nigeria) Enugu Rangers
Abel 6'; Teixeira 32'; Pimpão 66'	Report	Ogbonna 37'

Estádio 11 de Novembro, Luanda
Referee: Lamin Jammeh (Gambia)

Sagrada Esperança won 3–2 on aggregate.

14 September 2024
16:00 UTC+0

AS Douanes (Burkina Faso)	1–0	(Algeria) CR Belouizdad
Pitroipa 84'	Report

Stade Mamadou Konaté, Bamako (Mali)
Referee: William Oloya (Uganda)
20 September 2024
18:00 UTC+1

CR Belouizdad (Algeria)	1–0	(Burkina Faso) AS Douanes
Meziane 34'	Report
Penalties
Benguit (penalty missed); Chaabi (penalty scored); Zerrouki (penalty scored); Khacef (penalty scored); Mahious (penalty scored)	4–3	(penalty scored) Pitroipa; (penalty scored) Nikièma; (penalty scored) Banao; (penalty missed) Mu. Traoré; (penalty missed) S. Ouattara

Miloud Hadefi Stadium, Oran
Referee: Mitiku Tewodros (Ethiopia)

1–1 on aggregate. CR Belouizdad won 4–3 on penalties.

15 September 2024
15:00 UTC+0

Samartex (Ghana)	2–2	(Morocco) Raja CA
Gyetuah 37'; Ephson 44'	Report	Zrida 20'; Boulacsoute 63'

Accra Sports Stadium, Accra
Referee: Jelly Alfred Chavani (South Africa)
21 September 2024
20:00 UTC+1

Raja CA (Morocco)	2–0	(Ghana) Samartex
Zila 40'; Zerhouni 88'	Report

Larbi Zaouli Stadium, Casablanca
Referee: Messie Nkounkou (Congo)

Raja CA won 4–2 on aggregate.

13 September 2024
18:00 UTC+1

US Monastir (Tunisia)	1–0	(Algeria) MC Alger
Ghezala 23' (o.g.)	Report

Hammadi Agrebi Stadium, Tunis
Referee: Amin Omar (Egypt)
21 September 2024
20:00 UTC+1

MC Alger (Algeria)	2–0	(Tunisia) US Monastir
Naidji 71'; Orkuma 82' (o.g.)	Report

Ali La Pointe Stadium, Algiers
Referee: Abongile Tom (South Africa)

MC Alger won 2–1 on aggregate.

14 September 2024
16:00 UTC+0

Djoliba (Mali)	1–0	(Togo) ASKO Kara
Simpara 19' (pen.)	Report

Stade du 26 Mars, Bamako
Referee: Dickens Mimisa (Kenya)
22 September 2024
16:00 UTC+0

ASKO Kara (Togo)	0–1	(Mali) Djoliba
	Report	Simpara 89'

Stade de Kégué, Lomé
Referee: Mohamed Diraneh Guedi (Djibouti)

Djoliba won 2–0 on aggregate.

15 September 2024
19:00 UTC+0

Stade d'Abidjan (Ivory Coast)	2–0	(Guinea) Milo
Koné 35' (pen.); Traoré 60'	Report

Felix Houphouet Boigny Stadium, Abidjan
Referee: Mutaz Ibrahim (Libya)
22 September 2024
16:00 UTC+0

Milo (Guinea)	2–1	(Ivory Coast) Stade d'Abidjan
A. Bangoura 47'; S. Bangoura 56'	Report	Kore 34'

Stade Mamadou Konaté, Bamako (Mali)
Referee: Jeannot Franck Bito (Cameroon)

Stade d'Abidjan won 3–2 on aggregate.

15 September 2024
16:00 UTC+0

San Pédro (Ivory Coast)	2–2	(Sudan) Al Hilal
Bedi 32'; Bamba 58'	Report	Abdelrahman 42', 84'

Laurent Pokou Stadium, San Pédro
Referee: Lenine Delgado dos Santos Rocha (Cape Verde)
22 September 2024
19:00 UTC+0

Al Hilal (Sudan)	1–0	(Ivory Coast) San Pédro
Abdelrahman 45'	Report

Stade Cheikha Ould Boïdiya, Nouakchott (Mauritania)
Referee: Godfrey Nkhakananga (Malawi)

Al Hilal won 3–2 on aggregate.

14 September 2024
15:00 UTC+2

Al Merrikh (Sudan)	2–2	(Morocco) AS FAR
Saadeldin 27'; Gbane 38'	Report	Hrimat 79' (pen.); Hadraf 88' (pen.)

Juba Stadium, Juba (South Sudan)
Referee: Pierre Atcho (Gabon)
22 September 2024
19:00 UTC+1

AS FAR (Morocco)	2–0	(Sudan) Al Merrikh
Hammoudan 44'; Beya 61'	Report

Moulay Hassan Stadium, Rabat
Referee: Clement Franklin Kpan (Ivory Coast)

AS FAR won 4–2 on aggregate.

== See also ==
- 2024–25 CAF Confederation Cup qualifying rounds
