= 2024–25 CAF Champions League knockout stage =

- Dates: 1 April – 1 June 2025

Tournament statistics
- Matches played: 14
- Goals scored: 23 (1.64 per match)
- Attendance: 437,000 (31,214 per match)

The 2024–25 CAF Champions League knockout stage started on 1 April with the quarter-finals and ended on 1 June 2025 with the second leg of the final to decide the champions of the 2024–25 CAF Champions League. 8 teams competed in the knockout stage.

Times are local.

== Round and draw dates ==
The schedule was as follows.

Round	Draw date	First leg	Second leg
Quarter-finals	20 February 2025	1 April 2025	8 April 2025
Semi-finals	20 February 2025	18–19 April 2025	25–26 April 2025
Final	20 February 2025	24 May 2025	1 June 2025

== Format ==
Each tie in the knockout phase was played over two legs, with each team playing one leg at home. The team that scored more goals on aggregate over the two legs advanced to the next round. If the aggregate score is level, the away goals rule was applied, i.e. the team that scored more goals away from home over the two legs advanced. If away goals were also equal, then extra time was not played and the winners were decided by a penalty shoot-out (Regulations III. 26 & 27). The mechanism of the draws for each round was as follows:

- In the draw for the quarter-finals, the four group winners were seeded, and the four group runners-up were unseeded. The seeded teams were drawn against the unseeded teams, with the seeded teams hosting the second leg. Teams from the same group could not be drawn against each other, while teams from the same association could be drawn against each other.
- In the draws for the semi-finals, there were no seedings, and teams from the same group or the same association could be drawn against each other. As the draws for the quarter-finals and semi-finals were held together before the quarter-finals were played, the identity of the quarter-final winners was not known at the time of the semi-final draw.

== Qualified teams ==
The knockout stage involved the 8 teams qualifying as winners and runners-up of each of the eight groups in the group stage.

Group	Winners	Runners-up
A	(Sudan) Al Hilal	(Algeria) MC Alger
B	(Morocco) AS FAR	(South Africa) Mamelodi Sundowns
C	(South Africa) Orlando Pirates	(Egypt) Al Ahly
D	(Tunisia) Espérance de Tunis	(Egypt) Pyramids

== Bracket ==
The bracket of the knockout stage was determined as follows:

Round	Matchups
Quarter-finals	(Group winners hosted the second leg, matchups decided by draw, teams from same group cannot play each other): QF1; QF2; QF3; QF4
Semi-finals	(Matchups and order of legs decided by draw, between winners QF1, QF2, QF3, QF4): SF1; SF2
Final	Winners SF1 and SF2 faced each other in two legs to decide the champions

The bracket was decided after the draw for the knockout stage, which was held on 20 February 2025, 18:00 AST (UTC+3) at the beIN Sports headquarters in Doha, Qatar.

Quarter-finals
(South Africa) Mamelodi Sundowns	1	0	1
(Tunisia) Espérance de Tunis	0	0	0
(Egypt) Al Ahly	1	1	2
(Sudan) Al Hilal	0	0	0
(Algeria) MC Alger	0	0	0
(South Africa) Orlando Pirates	1	0	1
(Egypt) Pyramids	4	0	4
(Morocco) AS FAR	1	2	3

Semi-finals
(South Africa) Mamelodi Sundowns (a)	0	1	1
(Egypt) Al Ahly	0	1	1
(South Africa) Orlando Pirates	0	2	2
(Egypt) Pyramids	0	3	3

Final
(South Africa) Mamelodi Sundowns	1	1	2
(Egypt) Pyramids	1	2	3

== Quarter-finals ==
The draw for the quarter-finals was held on 20 February 2025.

=== Summary ===
The first legs were played on 1 April, and the second legs were played on 8 and 9 April 2025.

Team 1	Agg.	Team 2	1st leg	2nd leg
Al Ahly (Egypt)	2–0	(Sudan) Al Hilal	1–0	1–0
Pyramids (Egypt)	4–3	(Morocco) AS FAR	4–1	0–2
Mamelodi Sundowns (South Africa)	1–0	(Tunisia) Espérance de Tunis	1–0	0–0
MC Alger (Algeria)	0–1	(South Africa) Orlando Pirates	0–1	0–0

=== Matches ===
1 April 2025
21:00 UTC+2

Al Ahly (Egypt)	1–0	(Sudan) Al Hilal
Hany 11'	Report

Cairo International Stadium, Cairo
Attendance: 30,000
Referee: Alhadi Allaou Mahamat (Chad)
8 April 2025
19:00 UTC+0

Al Hilal (Sudan)	0–1	(Egypt) Al Ahly
	Report	Ashour 80'

Cheikha Ould Boïdiya Stadium, Nouakchott (Mauritania) (Note: Al Hilal played their knockout stage home matches at Cheikha Ould Boïdiya Stadium in Nouakchott (Mauritania), instead of their regular stadium, Al Hilal Stadium, Omdurman, due to the Sudanese civil war.)
Attendance: 1,000
Referee: Pierre Atcho (Gabon)

Al Ahly won 2–0 on aggregate.

1 April 2025
21:00 UTC+2

Pyramids (Egypt)	4–1	(Morocco) AS FAR
Mayele 2', 12'; Adel 38', 67'	Report	Hadraf 45'

30 June Stadium, Cairo
Attendance: 2,000
Referee: Omar Artan (Somalia)
8 April 2025
20:00 UTC+1

AS FAR (Morocco)	2–0	(Egypt) Pyramids
El Fahli 8'; Beya 82'	Report

Honneur Stadium, Meknes (Note: AS FAR played their knockout stage home matches at Honneur Stadium, Meknes, instead of their regular stadium, Prince Moulay Abdellah Stadium, Rabat, due to renovation works.)
Attendance: 12,000
Referee: Mutaz Ibrahim (Libya)

Pyramids won 4–3 on aggregate.

1 April 2025
15:00 UTC+2

Mamelodi Sundowns (South Africa)	1–0	(Tunisia) Espérance de Tunis
Shalulile 54'	Report

Loftus Versfeld Stadium, Pretoria
Attendance: 20,000
Referee: Jean-Jacques Ndala Ngambo (DR Congo)
8 April 2025
20:00 UTC+1

Espérance de Tunis (Tunisia)	0–0	(South Africa) Mamelodi Sundowns
	Report

Hammadi Agrebi Stadium, Tunis
Attendance: 50,000
Referee: Issa Sy (Senegal)

Mamelodi Sundowns won 1–0 on aggregate.

1 April 2025
20:00 UTC+1

MC Alger (Algeria)	0–1	(South Africa) Orlando Pirates
	Report	Nkota 65'

Stade du 5 Juillet, Algiers
Attendance: 60,000
Referee: Mahmood Ismail (Sudan)
9 April 2025
18:00 UTC+2

Orlando Pirates (South Africa)	0–0	(Algeria) MC Alger
	Report

Orlando Stadium, Johannesburg
Attendance: 35,000
Referee: Ibrahim Kalilou Traoré (Ivory Coast)

Orlando Pirates won 1–0 on aggregate.

== Semi-finals ==
The draw for the semi-finals was held on 20 February 2025 (after the quarter-finals draw).

=== Summary ===
The first legs were played on 19 April, and the second legs were played on 25 April 2025.

Team 1	Agg.	Team 2	1st leg	2nd leg
Mamelodi Sundowns (South Africa)	1–1 (a)	(Egypt) Al Ahly	0–0	1–1
Orlando Pirates (South Africa)	2–3	(Egypt) Pyramids	0–0	2–3

=== Matches ===
19 April 2025
15:00 UTC+2

Mamelodi Sundowns (South Africa)	0–0	(Egypt) Al Ahly
	Report

Loftus Versfeld Stadium, Pretoria
Attendance: 40,000
Referee: Omar Artan (Somalia)
25 April 2025
19:00 UTC+3

Al Ahly (Egypt)	1–1	(South Africa) Mamelodi Sundowns
Mohamed 24'	Report	Ibrahim 90' (o.g.)

Cairo International Stadium, Cairo
Attendance: 70,000
Referee: Dahane Beida (Mauritania)

1–1 on aggregate. Mamelodi Sundowns won on away goals.

19 April 2025
18:00 UTC+2

Orlando Pirates (South Africa)	0–0	(Egypt) Pyramids
	Report

Soccer City, Johannesburg
Attendance: 40,000
Referee: Pacifique Ndabihawenimana (Burundi)
25 April 2025
21:00 UTC+3

Pyramids (Egypt)	3–2	(South Africa) Orlando Pirates
Mayele 45+1', 84'; Sobhi 57'	Report	Mofokeng 41'; Nkota 52'

30 June Stadium, Cairo
Attendance: 2,000
Referee: Tanguy Mebiame (Gabon)

Pyramids won 3–2 on aggregate.

== Final ==
The first leg was played on 24 May, and the second leg was played on 1 June 2025.

Team 1	Agg.	Team 2	1st leg	2nd leg
Mamelodi Sundowns (South Africa)	2–3	(Egypt) Pyramids	1–1	1–2

24 May 2025
15:00 UTC+2

Mamelodi Sundowns (South Africa)	1–1	(Egypt) Pyramids
Ribeiro 54'	Report	El Karti 90+4'

Loftus Versfeld Stadium, Pretoria
Attendance: 50,000
Referee: Mahmood Ismail (Sudan)
1 June 2025
20:00 UTC+3

Pyramids (Egypt)	2–1	(South Africa) Mamelodi Sundowns
Mayele 23'; Samy 56'	Report	Rayners 75'

30 June Stadium, Cairo
Attendance: 25,000
Referee: Omar Artan (Somalia)

Pyramids won 3–2 on aggregate.

== See also ==
- 2024–25 CAF Confederation Cup knockout stage
