= 2024–25 CAF Champions League group stage =

International football competition

- Dates: 26 November 2024 – 19 January 2025

Tournament statistics
- Matches played: 48
- Goals scored: 110 (2.29 per match)

The 2024–25 CAF Champions League group stage began on 26 November 2024 and ended on 19 January 2025. 16 teams competed in the group stage to decide the eight places in the knockout stage of the 2024–25 CAF Champions League.

== Draw ==
The draw for the group stage was held on 7 October 2024, 11:00 GMT (14:00 local time, UTC+3), in Cairo, Egypt. The 16 winners of the second round of qualifying rounds were drawn into four groups of four.

The teams were seeded by their performances in the CAF competitions for the previous five seasons (CAF 5-year ranking points shown next to every team). Each group contained one team from each of Pot 1, Pot 2, Pot 3, and Pot 4, and each team were allocated to the positions in their group according to their pot.

Pot 1
Team	Pts
(Egypt) Al Ahly	87
(Tunisia) Espérance de Tunis	61
(South Africa) Mamelodi Sundowns	54
(Democratic Republic of the Congo) TP Mazembe	38

Pot 2
Team	Pts
(Algeria) CR Belouizdad	37
(Morocco) Raja CA	35
(Tanzania) Young Africans	31
(Egypt) Pyramids	29

Pot 3
Team	Pts
(Sudan) Al Hilal	25
(South Africa) Orlando Pirates	16
(Angola) Sagrada Esperança	8
(Morocco) AS FAR	8

Pot 4
Team	Pts
(Algeria) MC Alger	6
(Mali) Djoliba	1
(Democratic Republic of the Congo) AS Maniema Union	—
(Ivory Coast) Stade d'Abidjan	—

== Format ==
In the group stage, each group was played on a home-and-away round-robin basis. The winners and runners-up of each group advanced to the quarter-finals of the knockout stage.

=== Tiebreakers ===
The teams were ranked according to points (3 points for a win, 1 point for a draw, 0 points for a loss). If tied on points, tiebreakers were applied in the following order (Regulations III. 20 & 21):

1. Points in head-to-head matches among tied teams;
2. Goal difference in head-to-head matches among tied teams;
3. Goals scored in head-to-head matches among tied teams;
4. Away goals scored in head-to-head matches among tied teams;
5. If more than two teams were tied, and after applying all head-to-head criteria above, a subset of teams was still tied, all head-to-head criteria above were reapplied exclusively to this subset of teams;
6. Goal difference in all group matches;
7. Goals scored in all group matches;
8. Away goals scored in all group matches;
9. Drawing of lots.

== Schedule ==
The schedule of each matchday was as follows.

Matchday	Dates	Matches
Matchday 1	26 November 2024	Team 1 vs. Team 4, Team 2 vs. Team 3
Matchday 2	6–7 December 2024	Team 3 vs. Team 1, Team 4 vs. Team 2
Matchday 3	13–14 December 2024	Team 4 vs. Team 3, Team 1 vs. Team 2
Matchday 4	3–4 January 2025	Team 3 vs. Team 4, Team 2 vs. Team 1
Matchday 5	10–11 January 2025	Team 4 vs. Team 1, Team 3 vs. Team 2
Matchday 6	17–18 January 2025	Team 1 vs. Team 3, Team 2 vs. Team 4

== Groups ==
All times are local.

=== Group A ===
Pos	Team	Pld	W	D	L	GF	GA	GD	Pts	Qualification	HIL	MCA	YNG	TPM
1	(Sudan) Al Hilal	6	3	1	2	6	7	−1	10	Advance to knockout stage	—	1–1	0–1	2–1
2	(Algeria) MC Alger	6	2	3	1	4	2	+2	9	Advance to knockout stage	0–1	—	2–0	1–0
3	(Tanzania) Young Africans	6	2	2	2	5	6	−1	8		0–2	0–0	—	3–1
4	(Democratic Republic of the Congo) TP Mazembe	6	1	2	3	7	7	0	5		4–0	0–0	1–1	—

Source: CAF
Rules for classification: Group stage tiebreakers
26 November 2024
15:00 UTC+2

TP Mazembe (Democratic Republic of the Congo)	0–0	(Algeria) MC Alger
	Report

Stade TP Mazembe, Lubumbashi
Referee: Patrice Milazare (Mauritius)
26 November 2024
16:00 UTC+3

Young Africans (Tanzania)	0–2	(Sudan) Al Hilal
	Report	Coulibaly 63'; Muzmel 90'

Benjamin Mkapa Stadium, Dar es Salaam
Referee: Samir Guezzaz (Morocco)

7 December 2024
20:00 UTC+1

MC Alger (Algeria)	2–0	(Tanzania) Young Africans
Abdellaoui 64'; Bayazid 90+5'	Report

Stade du 5 Juillet, Algiers
Referee: Daniel Nii Laryea (Ghana)
8 December 2024
19:00 UTC+0

Al Hilal (Sudan)	2–1	(Democratic Republic of the Congo) TP Mazembe
Abdelrahman 22' (pen.); Girumugisha 90+1'	Report	Kabwit 64'

Cheikha Ould Boïdiya Stadium, Nouakchott (Mauritania) (Note: Al Hilal played their home matches at Cheikha Ould Boïdiya Stadium in Nouakchott (Mauritania), instead of their regular stadium, Al Hilal Stadium, Omdurman, due to the Sudanese civil war.)
Referee: Amin Omar (Egypt)

14 December 2024
15:00 UTC+2

TP Mazembe (Democratic Republic of the Congo)	1–1	(Tanzania) Young Africans
Fofana 41'	Report	Dube 90+4'

Stade TP Mazembe, Lubumbashi
Referee: Ibrahim Kalilou Traoré (Ivory Coast)
14 December 2024
20:00 UTC+1

MC Alger (Algeria)	0–1	(Sudan) Al Hilal
	Report	G. Fofana 76'

Stade du 5 Juillet, Algiers
Referee: Djindo Louis Houngnandande (Benin)

4 January 2025
16:00 UTC+3

Young Africans (Tanzania)	3–1	(Democratic Republic of the Congo) TP Mazembe
Mzize 33', 60'; Aziz Ki 56'	Report	Faty 16' (pen.)

Benjamin Mkapa Stadium, Dar es Salaam
Referee: Ahmad Heeralall (Mauritius)
5 January 2025
19:00 UTC+0

Al Hilal (Sudan)	1–1	(Algeria) MC Alger
Girumugisha 78'	Report	Bayazid 5'

Cheikha Ould Boïdiya Stadium, Nouakchott (Mauritania)
Referee: Ibrahim Kalilou Traoré (Ivory Coast)

10 January 2025
20:00 UTC+1

MC Alger (Algeria)	1–0	(Democratic Republic of the Congo) TP Mazembe
Bouras 36' (pen.)	Report

Stade du 5 Juillet, Algiers
Referee: Abongile Tom (South Africa)
12 January 2025
19:00 UTC+0

Al Hilal (Sudan)	0–1	(Tanzania) Young Africans
	Report	Aziz Ki 7'

Cheikha Ould Boïdiya Stadium, Nouakchott (Mauritania)
Referee: Samuel Uwikunda (Rwanda)

18 January 2025
15:00 UTC+2

TP Mazembe (Democratic Republic of the Congo)	4–0	(Sudan) Al Hilal
Diouf 21'; Keita 29'; Ngimbi 58'; Shaibu 89' (pen.)	Report

Stade TP Mazembe, Lubumbashi
Referee: Jalal Jayed (Morocco)
18 January 2025
16:00 UTC+3

Young Africans (Tanzania)	0–0	(Algeria) MC Alger
	Report

Benjamin Mkapa Stadium, Dar es Salaam
Referee: Patrice Milazare (Mauritius)

=== Group B ===
Pos	Team	Pld	W	D	L	GF	GA	GD	Pts	Qualification	FAR	MSFC	RCA	MUN
1	(Morocco) AS FAR	6	2	4	0	8	4	+4	10	Advance to knockout stage	—	1–1	1–1	2–0
2	(South Africa) Mamelodi Sundowns	6	2	3	1	5	4	+1	9	Advance to knockout stage	1–1	—	1–0	0–0
3	(Morocco) Raja CA	6	2	2	2	4	5	−1	8		0–2	1–0	—	1–0
4	(Democratic Republic of the Congo) AS Maniema Union	6	0	3	3	3	7	−4	3		1–1	1–2	1–1	—

Source: CAF
Rules for classification: Group stage tiebreakers
26 November 2024
18:00 UTC+2

Mamelodi Sundowns (South Africa)	0–0	(Democratic Republic of the Congo) AS Maniema Union
	Report

Loftus Versfeld Stadium, Pretoria
Referee: Mohamed Maarouf (Egypt)
26 November 2024
20:00 UTC+1

Raja CA (Morocco)	0–2	(Morocco) AS FAR
	Report	Hammoudan 41'; Aït Ouarkhane 90+7'

Larbi Zaouli Stadium, Casablanca (Note: Raja CA played their home matches at Larbi Zaouli Stadium, instead of their regular stadium, Stade Mohammed V, both located in Casablanca, due to renovation works.)
Referee: Issa Sy (Senegal)

7 December 2024
14:00 UTC+1

AS Maniema Union (Democratic Republic of the Congo)	1–1	(Morocco) Raja CA
Bakasu 79'	Report	Najjari 17'

Stade des Martyrs, Kinshasa (Note: AS Maniema Union played their home matches at Stade des Martyrs, Kinshasa, instead of their regular stadium, Stade Joseph Kabila Kabange, Kindu, which did not meet CAF requirements.)
Referee: Mahmood Ismail (Sudan)
7 December 2024
20:00 UTC+1

AS FAR (Morocco)	1–1	(South Africa) Mamelodi Sundowns
Hrimat 74'	Report	Rayners 66'

Ben M'Hamed El Abdi Stadium, El Jadida (Note: AS FAR played their home matches at Ben M'Hamed El Abdi Stadium, El Jadida and Honneur Stadium, Meknes, instead of their regular stadium, Prince Moulay Abdellah Stadium, Rabat, due to renovation works.)
Referee: Dahane Beida (Mauritania)

14 December 2024
14:00 UTC+1

AS Maniema Union (Democratic Republic of the Congo)	1–1	(Morocco) AS FAR
Moanda 37'	Report	Carneiro 62'

Stade des Martyrs, Kinshasa
Referee: Omar Artan (Somalia)
15 December 2024
15:00 UTC+2

Mamelodi Sundowns (South Africa)	1–0	(Morocco) Raja CA
Rayners 65'	Report

Loftus Versfeld Stadium, Pretoria
Referee: Pierre Atcho (Gabon)

4 January 2025
20:00 UTC+1

AS FAR (Morocco)	2–0	(Democratic Republic of the Congo) AS Maniema Union
Aït Ouarkhane 12'; Zouhzouh 45+3'	Report

Honneur Stadium, Meknes
Referee: Georges Gatogato (Burundi)
4 January 2025
20:00 UTC+1

Raja CA (Morocco)	1–0	(South Africa) Mamelodi Sundowns
Benamar 45+2'	Report

Larbi Zaouli Stadium, Casablanca
Referee: Abdel Aziz Mohamed Bouh (Mauritania)

11 January 2025
14:00 UTC+1

AS Maniema Union (Democratic Republic of the Congo)	1–2	(South Africa) Mamelodi Sundowns
Kitambala 38'	Report	Shalulile 83'; Moanda 90+5' (o.g.)

Stade des Martyrs, Kinshasa
Referee: Issa Sy (Senegal)
11 January 2025
20:00 UTC+1

AS FAR (Morocco)	1–1	(Morocco) Raja CA
Zniti 40' (o.g.)	Report	Zerhouni 77' (pen.)

Honneur Stadium, Meknes
Referee: Mohamed Maarouf (Egypt)

19 January 2025
18:00 UTC+2

Mamelodi Sundowns (South Africa)	1–1	(Morocco) AS FAR
Shalulile 12'	Report	Zouhzouh 83'

Loftus Versfeld Stadium, Pretoria
Referee: Peter Waweru (Kenya)
19 January 2025
17:00 UTC+1

Raja CA (Morocco)	1–0	(Democratic Republic of the Congo) AS Maniema Union
Ennafati 45+5' (pen.)	Report

Larbi Zaouli Stadium, Casablanca
Referee: Andofetra Rakotojaona (Madagascar)

=== Group C ===
Pos	Team	Pld	W	D	L	GF	GA	GD	Pts	Qualification	OPFC	AHL	CRB	SAB
1	(South Africa) Orlando Pirates	6	4	2	0	10	4	+6	14	Advance to knockout stage	—	0–0	2–1	3–0
2	(Egypt) Al Ahly	6	3	1	2	14	7	+7	10	Advance to knockout stage	1–2	—	6–1	4–2
3	(Algeria) CR Belouizdad	6	3	0	3	11	10	+1	9		1–2	1–0	—	6–0
4	(Ivory Coast) Stade d'Abidjan	6	0	1	5	4	18	−14	1		1–1	1–3	0–1	—

Source: CAF
Rules for classification: Group stage tiebreakers
26 November 2024
18:00 UTC+2

Al Ahly (Egypt)	4–2	(Ivory Coast) Stade d'Abidjan
Kahraba 14', 48'; Afsha 21'; El Shahat 26'	Report	Koné 30'; Assalé 55'

Cairo International Stadium, Cairo
Referee: Patrice Tanguy Mebiame (Gabon)
26 November 2024
20:00 UTC+1

CR Belouizdad (Algeria)	1–2	(South Africa) Orlando Pirates
Mayo 66'	Report	Nkota 5', 27'

Stade du 5 Juillet, Algiers
Referee: Jean-Jacques Ndala Ngambo (DR Congo)

7 December 2024
15:00 UTC+2

Orlando Pirates (South Africa)	0–0	(Egypt) Al Ahly
	Report

Orlando Stadium, Johannesburg
Referee: Abdel Aziz Mohamed Bouh (Mauritania)
7 December 2024
16:00 UTC+0

Stade d'Abidjan (Ivory Coast)	0–1	(Algeria) CR Belouizdad
	Report	Mahious 71'

Felix Houphouet Boigny Stadium, Abidjan (Note: Stade d'Abidjan played their home matches at Felix Houphouet Boigny Stadium, instead of their regular stadium, Robert Champroux Stadium, both located in Abidjan, which did not meet CAF requirements.)
Referee: Ahmad Heeralall (Mauritius)

14 December 2024
16:00 UTC+0

Stade d'Abidjan (Ivory Coast)	1–1	(South Africa) Orlando Pirates
Méité 53'	Report	Makgopa 45+3' (pen.)

Felix Houphouet Boigny Stadium, Abidjan
Referee: Jalal Jayed (Morocco)
22 December 2024 (Note: The Al Ahly v CR Belouizdad match, originally scheduled to be played on 13 or 14 December, was rescheduled to be played on 22 December 2024 due to Al Ahly participation in the 2024 FIFA Intercontinental Cup.)
18:00 UTC+2

Al Ahly (Egypt)	6–1	(Algeria) CR Belouizdad
Abou Ali 45+3', 51', 84'; El Shahat 56'; Tau 86'; Ashour 90+3'	Report	Mahious 21'

Cairo International Stadium, Cairo
Referee: Sadok Selmi (Tunisia)

3 January 2025
20:00 UTC+1

CR Belouizdad (Algeria)	1–0	(Egypt) Al Ahly
Khacef 90+1'	Report

Stade du 5 Juillet, Algiers
Referee: Omar Artan (Somalia)
4 January 2025
18:00 UTC+2

Orlando Pirates (South Africa)	3–0	(Ivory Coast) Stade d'Abidjan
Mofokeng 22'; Maswanganyi 50'; Hotto 85'	Report

Orlando Stadium, Johannesburg
Referee: Peter Waweru (Kenya)

11 January 2025
16:00 UTC+0

Stade d'Abidjan (Ivory Coast)	1–3	(Egypt) Al Ahly
Kore 26'	Report	Ashour 53', 73', 90+5'

Felix Houphouet Boigny Stadium, Abidjan
Referee: Boubou Traoré (Mali)
12 January 2025
15:00 UTC+2

Orlando Pirates (South Africa)	2–1	(Algeria) CR Belouizdad
Mofokeng 20'; Mbatha 61'	Report	Benguit 90+2'

Orlando Stadium, Johannesburg
Referee: Daniel Nii Laryea (Ghana)

18 January 2025
18:00 UTC+2

Al Ahly (Egypt)	1–2	(South Africa) Orlando Pirates
El Shahat 69'	Report	Mofokeng 53'; Mabaso 83'

Cairo International Stadium, Cairo
Referee: Babacar Sarr (Mauritania)
18 January 2025
17:00 UTC+1

CR Belouizdad (Algeria)	6–0	(Ivory Coast) Stade d'Abidjan
Meziane 17'; Belkhir 27', 36'; Mahious 49'; Hamroune 87'; Zerrouki 90'	Report

Stade du 5 Juillet, Algiers
Referee: Alhadi Allaou Mahamat (Chad)

=== Group D ===
Pos	Team	Pld	W	D	L	GF	GA	GD	Pts	Qualification	EST	PYR	GDSE	DJO
1	(Tunisia) Espérance de Tunis	6	4	1	1	12	3	+9	13 (Note: Ranked on goal difference in head-to-head matches: Espérance de Tunis +1, Pyramids –1.)	Advance to knockout stage	—	2–0	4–1	4–0
2	(Egypt) Pyramids	6	4	1	1	14	4	+10	13	Advance to knockout stage	2–1	—	5–1	6–0
3	(Angola) Sagrada Esperança	6	1	2	3	3	10	−7	5		0–0	0–1	—	1–0
4	(Mali) Djoliba	6	0	2	4	0	12	−12	2		0–1	0–0	0–0	—

Source: CAF
Rules for classification: Group stage tiebreakers
Notes:
26 November 2024
18:00 UTC+2

Pyramids (Egypt)	5–1	(Angola) Sagrada Esperança
Adel 17', 73'; Mo. Hamdy 50'; Mayele 77'; Atef 89'	Report	Cachí 90+2'

30 June Stadium, Cairo
Referee: Djindo Louis Houngnandande (Benin)
26 November 2024
20:00 UTC+1

Espérance de Tunis (Tunisia)	4–0	(Mali) Djoliba
Bouchniba 4'; Mokwana 40'; Bouguerra 76'; Maacha 90+5'	Report

Hammadi Agrebi Stadium, Tunis
Referee: Abongile Tom (South Africa)

6 December 2024
17:00 UTC+1

Sagrada Esperança (Angola)	0–0	(Tunisia) Espérance de Tunis
	Report

Estádio 11 de Novembro, Luanda (Note: Sagrada Esperança played their home matches at Estádio 11 de Novembro, Luanda, instead of their regular stadium, Estádio Sagrada Esperança, Dundo, which did not meet CAF requirements.)
Referee: Omar Artan (Somalia)
8 December 2024
16:00 UTC+0

Djoliba (Mali)	0–0	(Egypt) Pyramids
	Report

Stade du 26 Mars, Bamako
Referee: Alhadi Allaou Mahamat (Chad)

14 December 2024
20:00 UTC+1

Espérance de Tunis (Tunisia)	2–0	(Egypt) Pyramids
Belaïli 36'; Mokwana 45+3'	Report

Hammadi Agrebi Stadium, Tunis
Referee: Pacifique Ndabihawenimana (Burundi)
15 December 2024
16:00 UTC+0

Djoliba (Mali)	0–0	(Angola) Sagrada Esperança
	Report

Stade du 26 Mars, Bamako
Referee: Lahlou Benbraham (Algeria)

5 January 2025
17:00 UTC+1

Sagrada Esperança (Angola)	1–0	(Mali) Djoliba
Mussá 32'	Report

Estádio 11 de Novembro, Luanda
Referee: Mustapha Kechaf (Morocco)
5 January 2025
18:00 UTC+2

Pyramids (Egypt)	2–1	(Tunisia) Espérance de Tunis
Fathi 90'; Adel 90+3'	Report	Belaïli 56'

30 June Stadium, Cairo
Referee: Messie Nkounkou (Congo)

11 January 2025
17:00 UTC+1

Sagrada Esperança (Angola)	0–1	(Egypt) Pyramids
	Report	Mo. Hamdy 90+4'

Estádio 11 de Novembro, Luanda
Referee: Alhadi Allaou Mahamat (Chad)
12 January 2025
16:00 UTC+0

Djoliba (Mali)	0–1	(Tunisia) Espérance de Tunis
	Report	Mokwana 67'

Stade du 26 Mars, Bamako
Referee: Pierre Atcho (Gabon)

18 January 2025
20:00 UTC+1

Espérance de Tunis (Tunisia)	4–1	(Angola) Sagrada Esperança
Jabri 16', 55', 59'; Sasse 22'	Report	Dabanda 45+1'

Hammadi Agrebi Stadium, Tunis
Referee: Adalbert Diouf (Senegal)
18 January 2025
21:00 UTC+2

Pyramids (Egypt)	6–0	(Mali) Djoliba
Awujoola 2'; Ma. Hamdy 10'; Fathi 53'; Sobhi 60' (pen.); Magdy 66'; Obama 77'	Report

30 June Stadium, Cairo
Referee: Mahmood Ismail (Sudan)

== See also ==
- 2024–25 CAF Confederation Cup group stage
