= Goudouss Bamba =

Ivorian footballer (born 2008)

Personal information
- Date of birth: 7 October 2005 (age 21)
- Place of birth: Cote d'Ivoire
- Height: 1.77 m (5 ft 10 in)
- Position: Right back

Team information
- Current team: Ilves
- Number: 19

Senior career*
Years	Team	Apps	(Gls)
2023–2026	San Pédro		
2026–	Ilves	18	(1)

International career^{‡}
2024–	Cote d'Ivoire U20		
2026–	Cote d'Ivoire U23		
- * Club domestic league appearances and goals as of 13 November 2026 ‡ National team caps and goals as of 10 July 2026

Goudouss Bamba (born 7 October 2005) is an Ivorian professional footballer who plays as a defender for Finnish Veikkausliiga club Ilves.

== Club career ==
=== FC San Pédro ===
Bamba began his senior professional career in the Ivorian Ligue 1 with FC San Pédro. During the 2024–25 season, he established himself as a regular starter, making 33 appearances with full playing minutes and representing the club in continental CAF Champions League fixtures.

=== Ilves ===
On 26 January 2026, Bamba signed a 3+1 year contract with Finnish Veikkausliiga side Ilves, amid interest from several European and African clubs. He scored his first professional goal for the club in a league match against FC Inter in May 2026.

== International career ==
Bamba has represented the Ivory Coast at various youth international levels. He made his debut for the Ivory Coast national under-20 team in 2024, later serving as the team's captain across 12 international appearances. In May 2026, he received a call-up to the Ivory Coast under-23 national team for international fixtures.
