= Meknes Honor Stadium =

Multi-purpose stadium in Rabat, Morocco

Coordinates: 33°53′30″N 5°32′22″W

Honneur Stadium
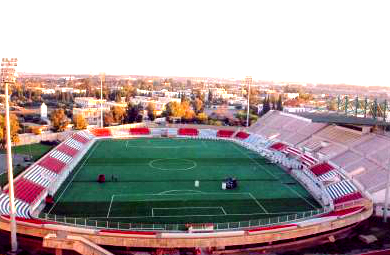
- Interactive map of Honneur Stadium
- Location: Meknes, Morocco
- Owner: Meknes Municipality
- Capacity: 12,000
- Surface: grass

Construction
- Opened: 1962
- Renovated: 2007

Tenants
- COD Meknès (1962–present); MAS Fez (2026–present) (temporary)

Honneur Stadium, officially Stade d'Honneur in French, is a multi-use stadium in Meknes, Morocco. It is currently used mostly for football matches and hosts the home games of COD Meknès. The stadium has a capacity of 12,000 people.
