= Clement Mzize =

Tanzanian footballer (born 2004)

Personal information
- Full name: Clement Francis Mzize
- Date of birth: 7 January 2004 (age 22)
- Place of birth: Muheza,Tanzania
- Height: 1.83 m (6 ft 0 in)
- Positions: Forward; left winger

Team information
- Current team: Young Africans
- Number: 24

Youth career
- 2020–2022: Young Africans

Senior career*
Years	Team	Apps	(Gls)
2022–	Young Africans	78	(33)

International career^{‡}
2023–	Tanzania	10	
- * Club domestic league appearances and goals ‡ National team caps and goals as of 1 july 2025

Clement Francis Mzize (7 January 2004), is a Tanzanian Professional footballer who plays as a forward or Left Winger for Tanzanian Premier League club Young Africans and the Tanzania national team. He known for his finishing, pace, dribbling ability and work rate.
