= Joël Beya =

Democratic Republic of the Congo footballer

Personal information
- Full name: Joël Beya Tumetuka
- Date of birth: 8 December 1999 (age 26)
- Height: 1.81 m (5 ft 11 in)
- Position: Forward

Team information
- Current team: AS FAR

Senior career*
Years	Team	Apps	(Gls)
2018–2019	Don Bosco		
2020–2024	TP Mazembe	29	(2)
2024–	AS FAR	27	(5)

International career^{‡}
2019–	DR Congo	6	(4)
- * Club domestic league appearances and goals as of 11:44, 11 July 2025 (UTC) ‡ National team caps and goals as of 11:44, 11 January 2020 (UTC)

Joël Beya Tumetuka (born 8 December 1999) is a Democratic Republic of the Congo footballer who currently plays as a forward for AS FAR.

== Career statistics ==
=== International ===
As of matches played 11 January 2020.

National team	Year	Apps	Goals
DR Congo	2019	3	4
DR Congo	2020	0	0
Total		3	4

=== International goals ===
Scores and results list DR Congo's goal tally first.

No	Date	Venue	Opponent	Score	Result	Competition
1.	18 September 2019	Stade des Martyrs, Kinshasa, Democratic Republic of the Congo	Rwanda	2–3	2–3	Friendly
2.	22 September 2019	Barthélemy Boganda Stadium, Bangui, Central African Republic	Central African Republic	1–0	2–0	2020 African Nations Championship qualification
3.	20 October 2019	Stade des Martyrs, Kinshasa, Democratic Republic of the Congo	Central African Republic	1–0	4–1	2020 African Nations Championship qualification
4.	20 October 2019	Stade des Martyrs, Kinshasa, Democratic Republic of the Congo	Central African Republic	3–0	4–1	2020 African Nations Championship qualification

== Honours ==
TP Mazembe

- Linafoot: 2021–22, 2023–24
