= 2025 CAF Confederation Cup final =

International football match in Africa

- Event: 2024–25 CAF Confederation Cup
| RS Berkane | Simba |
| (Morocco) | (Tanzania) |
| 3 | 1 |

First leg
| RS Berkane | Simba |
| 2 | 0 |
- Date: 17 May 2025
- Venue: Berkane Municipal Stadium, Berkane
- Referee: Pierre Atcho (Gabon)
- Attendance: 10,000
- Weather: Mostly cloudy 24 °C (75 °F); 64% humidity

Second leg
| Simba | RS Berkane |
| 1 | 1 |
- Date: 25 May 2024
- Venue: Amaan Stadium, Zanzibar City (Zanzibar)
- Referee: Dahane Beida (Mauritania)
- Attendance: 15,000
- Weather: Mostly sunny 29 °C (84 °F); 67% humidity

The 2025 CAF Confederation Cup final were the final matches of the 2024–25 CAF Confederation Cup, the 22nd season of the CAF Confederation Cup and the 50th as Africa's secondary club football competition organized by the Confederation of African Football (CAF).

== Teams ==
| Team | Zone | Previous finals appearances (bold indicates winners) |
|---|---|---|
| (Morocco) RS Berkane | UNAF (North Africa) | 4 (2019, **2020**, **2022**, 2024) |
| (Tanzania) Simba | CECAFA (East Africa) | none |

== Venues ==
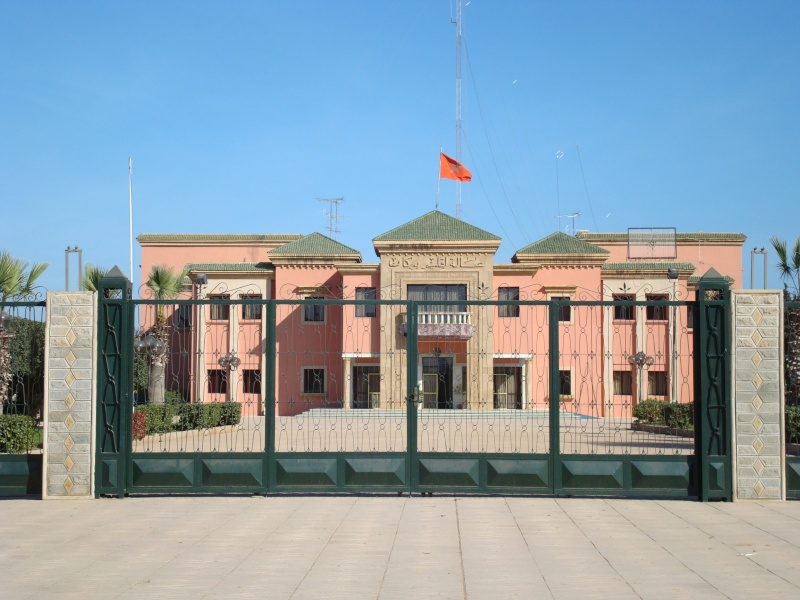
Berkane, Morocco, hosted the first leg.

Amaan Stadium in Zanzibar City, Zanzibar, hosted the second leg.

== Road to the final ==
Note: In all results below, the score of the finalist is given first (H: home; A: away).

| (Morocco) RS Berkane | | | | Round | (Tanzania) Simba | | | |
|---|---|---|---|---|---|---|---|---|
| Opponent | Agg | 1st leg | 2nd leg | Qualifying rounds | Opponent | Agg | 1st leg | 2nd leg |
| Bye | | | | First round | Bye | | | |
| (Benin) Dadje | 7–0 | 2–0 (A) | 5–0 (H) | Second round | (Libya) Al Ahli Tripoli | 3–1 | 0–0 (A) | 3–1 (H) |
| Opponent | Result | | | Group stage | Opponent | Result | | |
| (Angola) Desportivo da LS | 2–0 (H) | | | Matchday 1 | (Angola) Bravos do Maquis | 1–0 (H) | | |
| (South Africa) Stellenbosch | 3–1 (A) | | | Matchday 2 | (Algeria) CS Constantine | 1–2 (A) | | |
| (Mali) Stade Malien | 1–0 (H) | | | Matchday 3 | (Tunisia) CS Sfaxien | 2–1 (H) | | |
| (Mali) Stade Malien | 1–0 (A) | | | Matchday 4 | (Tunisia) CS Sfaxien | 1–0 (A) | | |
| (Angola) Desportivo da LS | 0–0 (A) | | | Matchday 5 | (Angola) Bravos do Maquis | 1–1 (A) | | |
| (South Africa) Stellenbosch | 5–0 (H) | | | Matchday 6 | (Algeria) CS Constantine | 2–0 (H) | | |
| **Group B winners**: Pos / Team / Pld / Pts; **1** / (Morocco) RS Berkane / **6** / **16**; 2 / (South Africa) Stellenbosch / 6 / **9**; 3 / (Angola) Desportivo da LS / 6 / **5**; 4 / (Mali) Stade Malien / 6 / **4**; Source: CAF | | | | Final standings | **Group A winners**: Pos / Team / Pld / Pts; **1** / (Tanzania) Simba / **6** / **13**; 2 / (Algeria) CS Constantine / 6 / **12**; 3 / (Angola) Bravos do Maquis / 6 / **7**; 4 / (Tunisia) CS Sfaxien / 6 / **3**; Source: CAF | | | |
| Opponent | Agg | 1st leg | 2nd leg | Knockout stage | Opponent | Agg | 1st leg | 2nd leg |
| (Ivory Coast) ASEC Mimosas | 2–0 | 1–0 (A) | 1–0 (H) | Quarter-finals | (Egypt) Al Masry | 2–2 (4–1 p) | 0–2 (A) | 2–0 (H) |
| (Algeria) CS Constantine | 4–1 | 4–0 (H) | 0–1 (A) | Semi-finals | (South Africa) Stellenbosch | 1–0 | 1–0 (H) | 0–0 (A) |

== Format ==
The final was played on a home-and-away two-legged basis.

If the aggregate score was tied after the second leg, the away goals rule was applied, and if still tied, extra time was not played, and a penalty shoot-out was used to determine the winner.

== Matches ==
=== First leg ===
==== Details ====
17 May 2025
20:00 UTC+1

| RS Berkane (Morocco) | 2–0 | (Tanzania) Simba |
|---|---|---|
| Camara 8'; Lamlioui 14' | Report |

Berkane Municipal Stadium, Berkane
Attendance: 10,000
Referee: Pierre Atcho (Gabon)

| **RS Berkane** | **Simba** |

| GK | 1 | (Morocco) Munir Mohamedi |
| DF | 4 | (Burkina Faso) Issoufou Dayo (c) |
| DF | 13 | (Morocco) Adil Tahif |
| DF | 15 | (Morocco) Abdelhak Assal |
| DF | 19 | (Morocco) Hamza El Moussaoui |
| MF | 6 | (Senegal) Mamadou Lamine Camara |
| MF | 8 | (Morocco) Ayoub Khairi | (substituted off) 74' |
| MF | 17 | (Morocco) Yassine Labhiri | (substituted off) 90+6' |
| FW | 18 | (Morocco) Imad Riahi | (substituted off) 74' |
| FW | 21 | (Morocco) Youssef Mehri |
| FW | 9 | (Morocco) Oussama Lamlioui | (substituted off) 90+6' |
Substitutes:
| GK | 22 | (Morocco) Mehdi Maftah |
| DF | 2 | (Morocco) Amine El Maswab |
| DF | 3 | (Morocco) Mohamed Sadil |
| MF | 5 | (Mali) Soumaila Sidibe |
| MF | 35 | (Morocco) Reda Hajji | (substituted on) 90+6' |
| FW | 7 | (Brazil) Mateus Santos | (substituted on) 87' |
| FW | 10 | (Morocco) Mohamed El Mourabit | (substituted on) 74' (substituted off) 87' |
| FW | 11 | (Morocco) Youssef Zghoudi | (substituted on) 74' |
| FW | 39 | (Cameroon) Baba Bello Ilou | (substituted on) 90+6' |
Manager:
(Tunisia) Mouin Chaâbani

| GK | 40 | (Guinea) Moussa Camara |
| DF | 2 | (Ivory Coast) Chamou Karaboue |
| DF | 12 | (Tanzania) Shomari Kapombe (c) |
| DF | 14 | (Tanzania) Abdulrazack Hamza | (substituted off) 23' |
| DF | 15 | (Tanzania) Mohamed Husseini |
| MF | 6 | (Democratic Republic of the Congo) Fabrice Ngoma |
| MF | 21 | (Tanzania) Yusuph Kagoma |
| MF | 10 | (Ivory Coast) Jean Charles Ahoua | (substituted off) 90+5' |
| FW | 34 | (Democratic Republic of the Congo) Elie Mpanzu | (substituted off) 80' |
| FW | 38 | (Tanzania) Kibu Denis | (substituted off) 46' |
| FW | 13 | (Cameroon) Leonel Ateba |
Substitutes:
| GK | 1 | (Tanzania) Ally Salim |
| DF | 3 | (Tanzania) David Kameta |
| DF | 20 | (Cameroon) Che Malone | (substituted on) 23' |
| DF | 29 | (Burkina Faso) Valentin Nouma | (substituted on) 46' |
| MF | 17 | (Republic of the Congo) Débora Fernandes | (substituted on) 90+5' |
| MF | 23 | (Zanzibar) Awesu Ally Awesu |
| MF | 25 | (Nigeria) Augustine Okejepha |
| FW | 11 | (Uganda) Steven Mukwala |
| FW | 26 | (Zambia) Joshua Mutale | (substituted on) 80' |
Head Coach:
(South Africa) Fadlu Davids

=== Second leg ===
==== Details ====
25 May 2025
16:00 UTC+3

| Simba (Tanzania) | 1–1 | (Morocco) RS Berkane |
|---|---|---|
| Mutale 17' | Report | Sidibe 90+3' |

Amaan Stadium, Zanzibar City (Zanzibar)
Attendance: 15,000
Referee: Dahane Beida (Mauritania)

| **Simba** | **RS Berkane** |

| GK | 40 | (Guinea) Moussa Camara |
| DF | 2 | (Ivory Coast) Chamou Karaboue |
| DF | 12 | (Tanzania) Shomari Kapombe (c) | (yellow card) 36' |
| DF | 20 | (Cameroon) Che Malone | | (substituted off) 84' |
| DF | 15 | (Tanzania) Mohamed Husseini | | (substituted off) 84' |
| MF | 6 | (Democratic Republic of the Congo) Fabrice Ngoma | (yellow card) 90+5' |
| MF | 21 | (Tanzania) Yusuph Kagoma | (yellow card) 36' (yellow-red card) 50' |
| MF | 10 | (Ivory Coast) Jean Charles Ahoua |
| FW | 34 | (Democratic Republic of the Congo) Elie Mpanzu |
| FW | 26 | (Zambia) Joshua Mutale | | (substituted off) 71' |
| FW | 11 | (Uganda) Steven Mukwala |
Substitutes:
| GK | 1 | (Tanzania) Ally Salim |
| DF | 3 | (Tanzania) David Kameta |
| DF | 29 | (Burkina Faso) Valentin Nouma | | (substituted on) 84' |
| MF | 17 | (Republic of the Congo) Débora Fernandes |
| MF | 23 | (Zanzibar) Awesu Ally Awesu |
| MF | 25 | (Nigeria) Augustine Okejepha |
| FW | 36 | (Tanzania) Ladaki Chasambi |
| FW | 38 | (Tanzania) Kibu Denis | | (substituted on) 71' |
| FW | 13 | (Cameroon) Leonel Ateba | | (substituted on) 84' |
Head Coach:
(South Africa) Fadlu Davids

| GK | 1 | (Morocco) Munir Mohamedi | (yellow card) 90+9' |
| DF | 4 | (Burkina Faso) Issoufou Dayo (c) |
| DF | 13 | (Morocco) Adil Tahif |
| DF | 15 | (Morocco) Abdelhak Assal |
| DF | 19 | (Morocco) Hamza El Moussaoui |
| MF | 6 | (Senegal) Mamadou Lamine Camara | (yellow card) 73' | (substituted off) 78' |
| MF | 8 | (Morocco) Ayoub Khairi | (yellow card) 42' | (substituted off) 68' |
| MF | 17 | (Morocco) Yassine Labhiri |
| FW | 18 | (Morocco) Imad Riahi | (yellow card) 59' | (substituted off) 59' |
| FW | 21 | (Morocco) Youssef Mehri |
| FW | 9 | (Morocco) Oussama Lamlioui | | (substituted off) 78' |
Substitutes:
| GK | 22 | (Morocco) Mehdi Maftah |
| DF | 2 | (Morocco) Amine El Maswab |
| DF | 3 | (Morocco) Mohamed Sadil |
| MF | 5 | (Mali) Soumaila Sidibe | | (substituted on) 78' |
| MF | 35 | (Morocco) Reda Hajji |
| FW | 7 | (Brazil) Mateus Santos |
| FW | 10 | (Morocco) Mohamed El Mourabit | | (substituted on) 68' |
| FW | 11 | (Morocco) Youssef Zghoudi | | (substituted on) 78' |
| FW | 30 | (Cameroon) Paul Bassène | | (substituted on) 59' |
Manager:
(Tunisia) Mouin Chaâbani

== See also ==
- 2025 CAF Champions League final
- 2025 CAF Super Cup
