= 2024–25 in Egyptian football =

Football in Egypt
- Season: 2024–25

Men's football
- Super Cup: Al Ahly

This article summarizes the activity of Egyptian football during the 2024–25 season, including domestic and international tournaments for senior and youth teams.

== National teams ==
=== Men ===
==== Senior ====
===== 2025 Africa Cup of Nations qualification =====
Pos	Team	Pld	W	D	L	GF	GA	GD	Pts	Qualification	Egypt	Botswana	Mauritania	Cape Verde
1	Egypt	6	4	2	0	12	2	+10	14	Final tournament	—	1–1	2–0	3–0
2	Botswana	6	2	2	2	4	7	−3	8	Final tournament	0–4	—	1–1	1–0
3	Mauritania	6	2	1	3	3	6	−3	7		0–1	1–0	—	1–0
4	Cape Verde	6	1	1	4	3	7	−4	4		1–1	0–1	2–0	—

Source: CAF

6 September 2024 1	Egypt	3–0	Cape Verde	Cairo
22:00 CAST (UTC+3)	Rabia 23'; Marmoush 45+1'; Adel 70'	Report		Stadium: Cairo International Stadium; Referee: Abongile Tom (South Africa)

10 September 2024 2	Botswana	0–4	Egypt	Francistown, Botswana
18:00 CAT (UTC+2)		Report	Trézéguet 5', 29'; Salah 56'; M. Fathi 90+4'	Stadium: Obed Itani Chilume Stadium; Referee: Omar Abdulkadir Artan (Somalia)

11 October 2024 3	Egypt	2–0	Mauritania	Cairo
19:00 CAST (UTC+3)	Trézéguet 69'; Salah 79'	Report		Stadium: Cairo International Stadium; Referee: Alhadi Allaou Mahamat (Chad)

15 October 2024 4	Mauritania	0–1	Egypt	Nouakchott, Mauritania
16:00 GMT (UTC±0)		Report	Adel 85'	Stadium: Cheikha Ould Boïdiya Stadium; Referee: Imtehaz Heeralall (Mauritius)

15 November 2024 5	Cape Verde	1–1	Egypt	Praia, Cape Verde
15:00 CVT (UTC−1)	Mendes 63' (pen.)	Report	Taher 31'	Stadium: Estádio Nacional de Cabo Verde; Referee: Djindo Louis Houngnandande (Benin)

19 November 2024 6	Egypt	1–1	Botswana	Cairo
17:00 CAT (UTC+2)	Trézéguet 15'	Report	Kebatho 8'	Stadium: 30 June Stadium; Referee: Lamin Jammeh (Gambia)

===== 2026 FIFA World Cup qualification =====
Pos	Team	Pld	W	D	L	GF	GA	GD	Pts	Qualification	(Egypt)	(Burkina Faso)	(Sierra Leone)	(Guinea-Bissau)	(Ethiopia)	(Djibouti)
1	Egypt	10	8	2	0	20	2	+18	26	2026 FIFA World Cup	—	2–1	1–0	1–0	2–0	6–0
2	Burkina Faso	10	6	3	1	23	8	+15	21		0–0	—	2–2	1–1	3–1	4–1
3	Sierra Leone	10	4	3	3	12	10	+2	15		0–2	0–1	—	3–1	2–0	2–1
4	Guinea-Bissau	10	2	4	4	8	10	−2	10		1–1	1–2	1–1	—	0–0	2–0
5	Ethiopia	10	2	3	5	9	14	−5	9		0–2	0–3	0–0	1–0	—	6–1
6	Djibouti	10	0	1	9	5	33	−28	1		0–3	0–6	1–2	0–1	1–1	—

Source: FIFA

21 March 2025 5	Ethiopia	v	Egypt	Casablanca, Morocco
22:00 WAT (UTC+1)		Report		Stadium: Larbi Zaouli Stadium
Note: The match will be played outside Ethiopia.

25 March 2025 6	Egypt	v	Sierra Leone	Cairo
21:00 CAT (UTC+2)		Report		Stadium: Cairo International Stadium

==== U23 ====
===== Friendlies =====
14 July 2024	Ukraine	1–1	Egypt	Saint-Paul-lès-Dax, France
19:00 CEST (UTC+2)	Braharu 14'	Report	Atef 80'	Stadium: Plaine des Sports

17 July 2024	Egypt	2–1	Iraq	Saint-Paul-lès-Dax, France
17:00 CEST (UTC+2)	Adel 2', 65'	Report	Tahseen 52'	Stadium: Plaine des Sports

===== 2024 Summer Olympics =====
Group stage

Pos	Team	Pld	W	D	L	GF	GA	GD	Pts	Qualification
1	Egypt	3	2	1	0	3	1	+2	7	Advance to knockout stage
2	Spain	3	2	0	1	6	4	+2	6	Advance to knockout stage
3	Dominican Republic	3	0	2	1	2	4	−2	2	
4	Uzbekistan	3	0	1	2	2	4	−2	1	

Source: FIFA

24 July 2024	Egypt	0–0	Dominican Republic	Nantes, France
17:00 CEST (UTC+2)		Report		Stadium: Stade de la Beaujoire; Attendance: 13,945; Referee: Yoshimi Yamashita (Japan)

27 July 2024	Uzbekistan	0–1	Egypt	Nantes, France
17:00 CEST (UTC+2)		Report	Koka 11'	Stadium: Stade de la Beaujoire; Attendance: 20,658; Referee: Campbell-Kirk Kawana-Waugh (New Zealand)

30 July 2024	Spain	1–2	Egypt	Bordeaux, France
15:00 CEST (UTC+2)	Omorodion 90'	Report	Adel 40', 62'	Stadium: Stade de Bordeaux; Attendance: 12,180; Referee: Drew Fischer (Canada)

Knockout stage

2 August 2024 Quarter-finals	Egypt	1–1 (a.e.t.) (5–4 p)	Paraguay	Marseille, France
19:00 CEST (UTC+2)	Ibrahim Adel 88'	Report	D. Gómez 71'	Stadium: Stade de Marseille; Attendance: 23,753; Referee: Glenn Nyberg (Sweden)
	Penalties
	Koka (penalty scored); El Neny (penalty scored); El Debes (penalty scored); Abdel Maguid (penalty scored); Adel (penalty scored)		(penalty scored) D. Gómez; (penalty missed) Pérez; (penalty scored) Viera; (penalty scored) M. Gómez; (penalty scored) Balbuena

5 August 2024 Semi-finals	France	3–1 (a.e.t.)	Egypt	Décines-Charpieu, France
21:00 CEST (UTC+2)	Mateta 83', 99'; Olise 108'	Report	Saber 62'	Stadium: Stade de Lyon; Attendance: 47,530; Referee: Saíd Martínez (Honduras)

8 August 2024 Bronze medal match	Egypt	0–6	Morocco	Nantes, France
17:00 CEST (UTC+2)		Report	Ezzalzouli 23'; Rahimi 26', 64'; El Khannouss 51'; Nakach 73'; Hakimi 87'	Stadium: Stade de la Beaujoire; Attendance: 27,391; Referee: Ramon Abatti (Brazil)

==== U20 ====
===== Friendlies =====
6 November 2024	Egypt	0–0	Tanzania	Cairo
20:00 UTC+2		Report		Stadium: 30 June Stadium

9 November 2024	Egypt	3–0	Tanzania	Ismailia
20:00 UTC+2	Bibo 17'; Zaalouk 35'; Khedr 41'	Report		Stadium: Suez Canal Stadium

===== 2025 U-20 Africa Cup of Nations qualification =====
14 November 2024	Egypt	1–2	Morocco	Ismailia
20:00 UTC+2	Elbana 50'		El Haddad 40'; Maamma 69'	Stadium: Suez Canal Stadium

17 November 2024	Egypt	1–1	Algeria	Ismailia
20:00 UTC+2	Zaalouk 57'		Kohili 86' (pen.)	Stadium: Suez Canal Stadium

20 November 2024	Libya	1–2	Egypt	Ismailia
17:00 UTC+2	Mansour 77'		Kabaka 75' (pen.); Bustangi 90'	Stadium: Suez Canal Stadium

26 November 2024	Egypt	1–0	Tunisia	Ismailia
	Fares Khaled (red card) 40'; Ahmed Kabaka 54'			Stadium: Suez Canal Stadium

==== U17 ====
===== Friendlies =====
17 August 2024	Egypt	2–1	Jordan	Alexandria
15:00 CAST (UTC+3)	Abdel Karim 30'; Attia 52'	Report	Ghaith 83'	Stadium: Alexandria Stadium; Referee: Rahma Youssef (Egypt)

20 August 2024	Egypt	1–1	Jordan	Alexandria
15:00 CAST (UTC+3)	Tamer 52'	Report	Salama 13'	Stadium: Alexandria Stadium; Referee: Mohamed Abdel Rahim (Egypt)

7 October 2024	Egypt	1–1	Kuwait	Alexandria
20:00 CAST (UTC+3)	Tarek (?)	Report	Al-Adwani (?)	Stadium: Alexandria Stadium
Note: Match was played behind closed doors

9 October 2024	Egypt	1–2	Russia	Alexandria
16:00 CAST (UTC+3)	Medhat 83' (pen.)	Report	Sosnikhin 45+1', 77'	Stadium: Alexandria Stadium; Referee: Ibrahim Mohamed (Egypt)

11 October 2024	Egypt	1–1	Russia	Alexandria
16:00 CAST (UTC+3)	Belal 80'	Report	Shilov 83' (pen.)	Stadium: Alexandria Stadium; Referee: Hesham El Kady (Egypt)

===== 2025 U-17 Africa Cup of Nations qualification =====
Pos	Team	Pld	W	D	L	GF	GA	GD	Pts	Qualification
1	Egypt	4	3	0	1	13	9	+4	9	2025 U-17 Africa Cup of Nations
2	Morocco (H)	4	2	2	0	10	4	+6	8	2025 U-17 Africa Cup of Nations
3	Tunisia	4	2	1	1	7	6	+1	7	2025 U-17 Africa Cup of Nations
4	Algeria	4	1	1	2	5	6	−1	4	
5	Libya	4	0	0	4	4	14	−10	0	

Source: UNAF
Rules for classification: 1) Points; 2) Goal difference; 3) Goals scored
(H) Hosts

11 November 2024	Morocco	5–1	Egypt	Mohammedia, Morocco
20:00 UTC+1	El Aoud 20'; Mawhoub 67'; Ouazane 69'; Baha 76'; Belmokhtar 90'	Report	Attia 89' (pen.)	Stadium: El Bachir Stadium

14 November 2024	Egypt	2–1	Algeria	Casablanca, Morocco
17:00 UTC+1	Hamad 59'; El Sayed 67'	Report	Chergui 45' (pen.)	Stadium: Père Jégo Stadium

20 November 2024	Tunisia	2–3	Egypt	Casablanca, Morocco
17:00 UTC+1	Saidi 4', 20'	Report	Attia 17'; El Zoghbi 81', 86'	Stadium: Père Jégo Stadium

23 November 2024	Egypt	7–1	Libya	Casablanca, Morocco
18:00 UTC+1	Abdel Karim 3', 53'; Hamad 27', 47'; Attia 65', 84', 90'	Report	Al Gamati 73'	Stadium: Père Jégo Stadium

== International competitions ==
=== FIFA competitions ===
==== FIFA Intercontinental Cup ====
29 October 2024 Second round	Al Ahly (Egypt)	3–0	(United Arab Emirates) Al Ain	Cairo, Egypt
20:00 CAST (UTC+3)	Abou Ali 32'; Ashour 55'; Magdy 90+2' (pen.)	Report		Stadium: Cairo International Stadium; Attendance: 51,602; Referee: Halil Umut Meler (Turkey)

14 December 2024 Play-off round	Pachuca (Mexico)	0–0 (a.e.t.) (6–5 p)	(Egypt) Al Ahly	Doha, Qatar
20:00 AST (UTC+3)		Report		Stadium: Stadium 974; Attendance: 38,841; Referee: Alireza Faghani (Australia)
	Penalties
	Rondón (penalty missed); Bastón (penalty missed); Cabral (penalty scored); Idrissi (penalty scored); Deossa (penalty scored); Montiel (penalty scored); Rodríguez (penalty scored); Gil (penalty scored)		(penalty scored) Magdy; (penalty scored) Rabia; (penalty scored) Attia; (penalty missed) Kahraba; (penalty missed) Kamal; (penalty scored) El Solia; (penalty scored) Tau; (penalty missed) Abdelfattah

=== CAF competitions ===
==== CAF Super Cup ====
27 September 2024
21:00 UTC+3

Al Ahly (Egypt)	1–1	(Egypt) Zamalek
Abou Ali 44' (pen.)	Report	Nasser Mansi 77'
Penalties
Rabia (penalty scored); Kamal (penalty scored); Attiyat Allah (penalty missed); Taher (penalty scored); Abou Ali (penalty missed)	3–4	(penalty scored) El Said; (penalty scored) Mathlouthi; (penalty scored) Mansi; (penalty scored) Abdelmaguid

Kingdom Arena, Riyadh (Saudi Arabia)
Referee: Mutaz Ibrahim (Libya)

==== CAF Champions League ====
First round

Team 1	Agg.	Team 2	1st leg	2nd leg
JKU (Zanzibar)	1–9	(Egypt) Pyramids	0–6	1–3

Second round

Team 1	Agg.	Team 2	1st leg	2nd leg
Gor Mahia (Kenya)	0–6	(Egypt) Al Ahly	0–3	0–3
APR (Rwanda)	2–4	(Egypt) Pyramids	1–1	1–3

Group stage

Group C

Pos	Team	Pld	W	D	L	GF	GA	GD	Pts	Qualification	OPFC	AHL	CRB	SAB
1	(South Africa) Orlando Pirates	6	4	2	0	10	4	+6	14	Advance to knockout stage	—	0–0	2–1	3–0
2	(Egypt) Al Ahly	6	3	1	2	14	7	+7	10	Advance to knockout stage	1–2	—	6–1	4–2
3	(Algeria) CR Belouizdad	6	3	0	3	11	10	+1	9		1–2	1–0	—	6–0
4	(Ivory Coast) Stade d'Abidjan	6	0	1	5	4	18	−14	1		1–1	1–3	0–1	—

Source: CAF

Group D

Pos	Team	Pld	W	D	L	GF	GA	GD	Pts	Qualification	EST	PYR	GDSE	DJO
1	(Tunisia) Espérance de Tunis	6	4	1	1	12	3	+9	13 (Note: Ranked on goal difference in head-to-head matches: Espérance de Tunis +1, Pyramids –1.)	Advance to knockout stage	—	2–0	4–1	4–0
2	(Egypt) Pyramids	6	4	1	1	14	4	+10	13	Advance to knockout stage	2–1	—	5–1	6–0
3	(Angola) Sagrada Esperança	6	1	2	3	3	10	−7	5		0–0	0–1	—	1–0
4	(Mali) Djoliba	6	0	2	4	0	12	−12	2		0–1	0–0	0–0	—

Source: CAF
Notes:

Quarter-finals

Team 1	Agg.	Team 2	1st leg	2nd leg
Al Ahly (Egypt)	QF1	(Sudan) Al Hilal	1–2 Apr	8–9 Apr
Pyramids (Egypt)	QF2	(Morocco) AS FAR	1–2 Apr	8–9 Apr

==== CAF Confederation Cup ====
Second round

Team 1	Agg.	Team 2	1st leg	2nd leg
Administration Police (Kenya)	1–3	(Egypt) Zamalek	0–1	1–2
Al Hilal Benghazi (Libya)	5–5 (3–5 p)	(Egypt) Al Masry	3–2	2–3

Group stage

Group D

Pos	Team	Pld	W	D	L	GF	GA	GD	Pts	Qualification	ZAM	MAS	ENY	ABB
1	(Egypt) Zamalek	6	4	2	0	11	4	+7	14	Advance to knockout stage	—	1–0	3–1	2–0
2	(Egypt) Al Masry	6	2	3	1	7	4	+3	9	Advance to knockout stage	0–0	—	2–0	3–1
3	(Nigeria) Enyimba	6	1	2	3	8	12	−4	5		2–2	1–1	—	4–1
4	(Mozambique) Black Bulls	6	1	1	4	7	13	−6	4		1–3	1–1	3–0	—

Source: CAF

Pos	Team	Pld	W	D	L	GF	GA	GD	Pts	Qualification	ZAM	MAS	ENY	ABB
1	(Egypt) Zamalek	6	4	2	0	11	4	+7	14	Advance to knockout stage	—	1–0	3–1	2–0
2	(Egypt) Al Masry	6	2	3	1	7	4	+3	9	Advance to knockout stage	0–0	—	2–0	3–1
3	(Nigeria) Enyimba	6	1	2	3	8	12	−4	5		2–2	1–1	—	4–1
4	(Mozambique) Black Bulls	6	1	1	4	7	13	−6	4		1–3	1–1	3–0	—

Source: CAF

Quarter-finals

Team 1	Agg.	Team 2	1st leg	2nd leg
Stellenbosch (South Africa)	QF1	(Egypt) Zamalek	2 Apr	9 Apr
Al Masry (Egypt)	QF4	(Tanzania) Simba	2 Apr	9 Apr

==== CAF Women's Champions League ====
UNAF Qualifiers

Pos	Team	Pld	W	D	L	GF	GA	GD	Pts	Qualification
1	(Morocco) AS FAR	3	3	0	0	10	0	+10	9	Main tournament (Note: FC Masar, who were known as Tutankhamun during the qualifiers, qualified to the finals on 15 October 2024, as the qualifiers winners AS FAR also won the Moroccan Women's Championship and automatically qualified as hosts.)
2	(Egypt) Tutankhamun	3	2	0	1	11	3	+8	6	Main tournament
3	(Algeria) CF Akbou (H)	3	1	0	2	6	9	−3	3	
4	(Tunisia) ASF Sousse	3	0	0	3	1	16	−15	0	

Source: UNAF
(H) Hosts
Notes:

Group stage

Group B

Pos	Team	Pld	W	D	L	GF	GA	GD	Pts	Qualification
1	(Nigeria) Edo Queens	3	2	1	0	5	1	+4	7 (Note: Tied on head-to-head points. Overall goal difference: Edo Queens +4, FC Masar +2.)	Advance to knockout stage
2	(Egypt) FC Masar	3	2	1	0	3	1	+2	7	Advance to knockout stage
3	(South Africa) Mamelodi Sundowns	3	1	0	2	5	3	+2	3	
4	(Ethiopia) CBE	3	0	0	3	1	9	−8	0	

Source: Soccerway
Notes:

Knockout phase

19 November 2024 Semi-finals	AS FAR (Morocco)	2–1	(Egypt) FC Masar	El Jadida, Morocco
18:00 WAT (UTC+1)	Banouk 12'; El Madani 90+6'	Report	Ehab 90+5' (pen.)	Stadium: Ben M'Hamed El Abdi Stadium; Referee: Antsino Twanyanyukwa (Namibia)

22 November 2024 Third place play-off	FC Masar (Egypt)	0–0 (4–3 p)	(Nigeria) Edo Queens	El Jadida, Morocco
18:00 WAT (UTC+1)		Report		Stadium: Ben M'Hamed El Abdi Stadium; Referee: Aline Umutoni (Rwanda)
	Penalties
	Niyonkuru (penalty scored); Abdel Wahed (penalty scored); Moustafa (penalty scored); Abou El Wafa (penalty missed); Ali (penalty scored)		(penalty missed) Mafisere; (penalty scored) Ilivieda; (penalty scored) Essien; (penalty scored) Ijamilusi; (penalty missed) Olise

== Domestic competitions ==
=== Premier League ===
Regular season

Pos	Team	Pld	W	D	L	GF	GA	GD	Pts	Qualification or relegation
1	Pyramids	17	13	3	1	32	10	+22	42	Qualification for the championship play-offs
2	Al Ahly	17	11	6	0	30	9	+21	39	Qualification for the championship play-offs
3	Zamalek	17	9	5	3	30	16	+14	32	Qualification for the championship play-offs
4	Al Masry	17	8	6	3	19	11	+8	30	Qualification for the championship play-offs
5	National Bank of Egypt	17	8	5	4	22	18	+4	29	Qualification for the championship play-offs
6	Ceramica Cleopatra	17	6	6	5	23	21	+2	24	Qualification for the championship play-offs
7	Pharco	17	6	5	6	17	19	−2	23	Qualification for the championship play-offs
8	Petrojet	17	5	7	5	17	18	−1	22	Qualification for the championship play-offs
9	Haras El Hodoud	17	6	4	7	17	19	−2	22	Qualification for the championship play-offs
10	Tala'ea El Gaish	17	5	6	6	13	18	−5	21	Qualification for the relegation play-offs
11	ZED	17	4	9	4	15	13	+2	21	Qualification for the relegation play-offs
12	Smouha	17	6	2	9	13	22	−9	20	Qualification for the relegation play-offs
13	Al Ittihad	17	4	6	7	11	16	−5	18	Qualification for the relegation play-offs
14	Ghazl El Mahalla	17	5	2	10	16	24	−8	17	Qualification for the relegation play-offs
15	El Gouna	17	4	5	8	10	15	−5	17	Qualification for the relegation play-offs
16	Ismaily	17	3	5	9	11	21	−10	14	Qualification for the relegation play-offs
17	ENPPI	17	2	6	9	10	21	−11	12	Qualification for the relegation play-offs
18	Modern Sport	17	1	6	10	9	24	−15	9	Qualification for the relegation play-offs

Source: Soccerway (regular season)
Rules for classification: 1) Points; 2) Goal difference; 3) Goals scored.

Championship play-offs

Pos	Team	Pld	W	D	L	GF	GA	GD	Pts	Qualification
1	Al Ahly (C)	8	6	1	1	22	9	+13	58 (Note: Al Ahly were initially deducted three points for refusing to play their away fixture against Zamalek, scheduled to be played on 11 March 2025. The points deduction was later cancelled by the Egyptian Premier League.)	Qualification for the Champions League first or second round
2	Pyramids	8	4	2	2	15	10	+5	56	Qualification for the Champions League first or second round
3	Zamalek	8	4	3	1	14	6	+8	47	Qualification for the Confederation Cup first or second round
4	Al Masry	8	3	3	2	10	9	+1	42	Qualification for the Confederation Cup first or second round
5	National Bank of Egypt SC	8	2	3	3	13	12	+1	38	
6	Ceramica Cleopatra	8	4	1	3	15	12	+3	37	
7	Pharco	8	2	3	3	8	16	−8	32	
8	Petrojet	8	1	2	5	7	17	−10	27	
9	Haras El Hodoud	8	0	2	6	3	16	−13	24	

Source: Soccerway (championship round)
Rules for classification: 1) Points; 2) Goal difference; 3) Goals scored; 4) Play-off tie.
(Note: Clubs qualified for this phase with the full regular season points they got, but without goals for or against)
(C) Champions
Notes:

Relegation play-offs

Pos	Team	Pld	W	D	L	GF	GA	GD	Pts
1	ZED	8	2	5	1	9	5	+4	32
2	El Gouna	8	4	1	3	10	7	+3	30
3	Tala'ea El Gaish	8	1	5	2	5	6	−1	29
4	ENPPI	8	4	3	1	8	5	+3	27
5	Modern Sport	8	5	2	1	12	7	+5	26
6	Al Ittihad	8	1	5	2	3	5	−2	26
7	Smouha	8	0	5	3	2	6	−4	25
8	Ismaily	8	2	3	3	7	7	0	23
9	Ghazl El Mahalla	8	1	3	4	4	12	−8	23

Source: Soccerway (relegation round)
Rules for classification: 1) Points; 2) Goal difference; 3) Goals scored; 4) Play-off tie.
(Note: Clubs qualified for this phase with the full regular season points they got, but without goals for or against)

=== Second Division A ===
Pos	Team	Pld	W	D	L	GF	GA	GD	Pts	Promotion or relegation
1	Al Mokawloon Al Arab (C, P)	38	22	11	5	54	33	+21	77	Promotion to Premier League
2	Wadi Degla (P)	38	21	13	4	44	14	+30	76	Promotion to Premier League
3	Kahraba Ismailia (P)	38	21	11	6	67	35	+32	74 (Note: Kahraba Ismailia finished ahead of Abou Qir Fertilizers on head-to-head points: Abou Qir Fertilizers 1–4 Kahraba Ismailia, Kahraba Ismailia 1–2 Abou Qir Fertilizers.)	Promotion to Premier League
4	Abou Qir Fertilizers	38	21	11	6	55	24	+31	74	
5	El Sekka El Hadid	38	14	15	9	41	31	+10	57	
6	El Qanah	38	14	13	11	47	41	+6	55	
7	Aswan	38	13	15	10	31	30	+1	54	
8	Proxy	38	10	21	7	46	47	−1	51	
9	Asyut Petroleum	38	11	16	11	39	42	−3	49 (Note: Asyut Petroleum finished ahead of Telecom Egypt on head-to-head points: Asyut Petroleum 1–1 Telecom Egypt, Telecom Egypt 0–1 Asyut Petroleum.)	
10	Telecom Egypt	38	12	13	13	36	42	−6	49	
11	Tersana	38	13	9	16	37	43	−6	48	
12	Baladiyat El Mahalla	38	9	18	11	25	27	−2	45	
13	El Dakhleya	38	11	10	17	31	45	−14	43	
14	El Mansoura	38	10	10	18	25	38	−13	40	
15	Tanta	38	9	12	17	28	35	−7	39 (Note: Tanta finished ahead of Raya Ghazl Kafr El Dawa on head-to-head goal difference: Raya Ghazl Kafr El Dawa 1–1 Tanta, Tanta 0–0 Raya Ghazl Kafr El Dawa.)	
16	Raya Ghazl Kafr El Dawar	38	6	21	11	23	32	−9	39	
17	Dayrout	38	8	14	16	36	45	−9	38 (Note: Dayrout finished ahead of La Viena on head-to-head points: Dayrout 1–1 La Viena, La Viena 0–2 Dayrout.)	
18	La Viena (R)	38	8	14	16	28	39	−11	38	Relegation to Second Division B
19	Suez (R)	38	6	11	21	25	54	−29	29 (Note: Suez finished ahead of Sporting Alexandria on head-to-head goal difference: Suez 0–0 Sporting Alexandria, Sporting Alexandria 1–1 Suez.)	Relegation to Second Division B
20	Sporting Alexandria (R)	38	5	14	19	26	47	−21	29	Relegation to Second Division B

Source: Soccerway
Rules for classification: 1) Points; 2) Head-to-head points; 3) Head-to-head goal difference; 4) Goal difference; 5) Goals scored; 6) Play-off tie.
(Note: Head-to-head records are used for final standings only)
(C) Champions; (P) Promoted; (R) Relegated

=== Second Division B ===
==== Regular season ====
===== Group A =====
Pos	Team	Pld	W	D	L	GF	GA	GD	Pts	Qualification or relegation
1	Al Nasr Lel Taa'den	18	9	6	3	19	13	+6	33	Qualification for promotion play-offs
2	Luxor	18	8	7	3	27	21	+6	31 (Note: Teams are ranked on head-to-head record.)	Qualification for promotion play-offs
3	Al Madina Al Monawara	18	8	7	3	22	16	+6	31	Qualification for promotion play-offs
4	Al Aluminium	18	8	5	5	25	16	+9	29	
5	Tahta	18	4	8	6	18	18	0	20 (Note: Teams are ranked on head-to-head record.)	
6	Qus	18	4	8	6	14	22	−8	20	
7	Muslim Youths (Qena)	18	4	7	7	13	17	−4	19	
8	Makadi	18	3	9	6	12	14	−2	18 (Note: Teams are ranked on head-to-head record.)	
9	MS Sohag	18	4	6	8	19	25	−6	18	
10	KIMA Aswan (R)	18	5	3	10	14	21	−7	18	Relegation to Third Division

Source: Media B
Rules for classification: 1) Points; 2) Head-to-head points; 3) Head-to-head goal difference; 4) Goal difference; 5) Goals scored; 6) Play-off tie.
(R) Relegated

===== Group B =====
Pos	Team	Pld	W	D	L	GF	GA	GD	Pts	Qualification or relegation
1	FC Masar	20	14	4	2	39	16	+23	46	Qualification for promotion play-offs
2	Asyut Cement	20	12	4	4	30	15	+15	40	Qualification for promotion play-offs
3	Misr Lel Makkasa	20	12	3	5	25	14	+11	39	Qualification for promotion play-offs
4	Egypt Stars	20	11	4	5	27	19	+8	37	
5	Telephonat Beni Suef	20	5	11	4	19	17	+2	26	
6	El Minya	20	6	7	7	23	21	+2	25	
7	Al Badari	20	6	4	10	20	23	−3	22	
8	Faiyum	20	6	2	12	18	29	−11	20	
9	MS Tamya	20	6	1	13	21	39	−18	19	
10	Beni Mazar	20	4	4	12	18	31	−13	16 (Note: Teams are ranked on head-to-head record.)	
11	Al Wasta (R)	20	4	4	12	20	36	−16	16	Relegation to Third Division

Source: Media B
Rules for classification: 1) Points; 2) Head-to-head points; 3) Head-to-head goal difference; 4) Goal difference; 5) Goals scored; 6) Play-off tie.
(R) Relegated

===== Group C =====
Pos	Team	Pld	W	D	L	GF	GA	GD	Pts	Qualification or relegation
1	Al Obour	18	11	5	2	29	14	+15	38	Qualification for promotion play-offs
2	Al Nasr	18	10	5	3	31	14	+17	35	Qualification for promotion play-offs
3	Port Fouad	18	8	8	2	19	13	+6	32	Qualification for promotion play-offs
4	Al Merreikh	18	8	7	3	20	14	+6	31	
5	Al Mostaqbal	18	6	7	5	16	17	−1	25	
6	El Shams	18	5	8	5	17	17	0	23	
7	El Sharkia	18	5	7	6	23	20	+3	22	
8	6th of October	18	3	6	9	18	26	−8	15	
9	Sinai Star	18	2	4	12	13	30	−17	10	
10	South Sinai (R)	18	1	5	12	9	30	−21	8	Relegation to Third Division

Source: Media B
Rules for classification: 1) Points; 2) Head-to-head points; 3) Head-to-head goal difference; 4) Goal difference; 5) Goals scored; 6) Play-off tie.
(R) Relegated

===== Group D =====
Pos	Team	Pld	W	D	L	GF	GA	GD	Pts	Qualification or relegation
1	El Entag El Harby	20	11	7	2	31	15	+16	40	Qualification for promotion play-offs
2	Gomhoriat Shebin	20	9	8	3	21	13	+8	35	Qualification for promotion play-offs
3	Team FC	20	8	9	3	29	22	+7	33	Qualification for promotion play-offs
4	Eastern Company	20	7	10	3	31	21	+10	31	
5	Misr Insurance	20	7	7	6	15	17	−2	28	
6	Ittihad El Shorta	20	7	6	7	25	23	+2	27 (Note: Teams are ranked on head-to-head record.)	
7	Diamond	20	8	3	9	26	27	−1	27	
8	Nogoom	20	7	5	8	23	24	−1	26	
9	Benha	20	5	7	8	19	25	−6	22	
10	Alo Egypt	20	4	4	12	17	29	−12	16	
11	Plastic Shubra El Kheima (R)	20	0	8	12	12	33	−21	8	Relegation to Third Division

Source: Media B
Rules for classification: 1) Points; 2) Head-to-head points; 3) Head-to-head goal difference; 4) Goal difference; 5) Goals scored; 6) Play-off tie.
(R) Relegated

===== Group E =====
Pos	Team	Pld	W	D	L	GF	GA	GD	Pts	Qualification or relegation
1	Maleyat Kafr El Zayat	22	12	8	2	30	11	+19	44	Qualification for promotion play-offs
2	MS El Kazazin	22	10	8	4	26	11	+15	38	Qualification for promotion play-offs
3	MS Tala	22	8	13	1	23	14	+9	37	Qualification for promotion play-offs
4	Pioneers	22	8	10	4	25	13	+12	34	
5	Kafr El Sheikh	22	7	10	5	21	17	+4	31 (Note: Teams are ranked on head-to-head record.)	
6	Said El Mahalla	22	8	7	7	21	23	−2	31	
7	Dikernis	22	7	8	7	20	21	−1	29 (Note: Teams are ranked on head-to-head record.)	
8	Ittihad Nabarouh	22	6	11	5	19	20	−1	29	
9	Biyala	22	7	6	9	24	28	−4	27	
10	Belqas City	22	5	9	8	21	24	−3	24	
11	Beni Ebeid	22	4	6	12	16	28	−12	18	
12	Damietta (R)	22	0	4	18	10	46	−36	4	Relegation to Third Division

Source: Media B
Rules for classification: 1) Points; 2) Head-to-head points; 3) Head-to-head goal difference; 4) Goal difference; 5) Goals scored; 6) Play-off tie.
(R) Relegated

===== Group F =====
Pos	Team	Pld	W	D	L	GF	GA	GD	Pts	Qualification or relegation
1	Olympic Club	20	13	6	1	36	9	+27	45	Qualification for promotion play-offs
2	Delphi	20	10	8	2	26	9	+17	38	Qualification for promotion play-offs
3	Ala'ab Damanhour	20	10	7	3	22	11	+11	37	Qualification for promotion play-offs
4	Fleet Club	20	10	5	5	29	18	+11	35	
5	Al Magd	20	7	6	7	15	16	−1	27	
6	MS Koum Hamada	20	5	10	5	17	14	+3	25 (Note: Teams are ranked on head-to-head record.)	
7	Horse Owners' Club	20	6	7	7	24	30	−6	25	
8	Al Hilal (El Dabaa)	20	4	7	9	20	24	−4	19	
9	Al Hammam	20	3	9	8	14	23	−9	18	
10	El Zohour	20	3	5	12	15	40	−25	14	
11	Al Jazeera (R)	20	2	4	14	14	38	−24	10	Relegation to Third Division

Source: Media B
Rules for classification: 1) Points; 2) Head-to-head points; 3) Head-to-head goal difference; 4) Goal difference; 5) Goals scored; 6) Play-off tie.
(R) Relegated

==== Play-offs ====
===== Promotion Group A =====
Pos	Team	Pld	W	D	L	GF	GA	GD	Pts	Promotion
1	FC Masar (P)	10	9	1	0	24	4	+20	28	Promotion to Second Division A
2	Asyut Cement	10	7	2	1	20	7	+13	23	
3	Misr Lel Makkasa	10	4	2	4	17	15	+2	14	
4	Al Nasr Lel Taa'den	10	2	2	6	3	12	−9	8	
5	Al Madina Al Monawara	10	2	1	7	6	11	−5	7	
6	Luxor	10	2	0	8	6	27	−21	6	

Source: Kora B
Rules for classification: 1) Points; 2) Head-to-head points; 3) Head-to-head goal difference; 4) Goal difference; 5) Goals scored; 6) Play-off tie.
(P) Promoted

===== Promotion Group B =====
Pos	Team	Pld	W	D	L	GF	GA	GD	Pts	Promotion
1	El Entag El Harby (P)	10	6	4	0	12	4	+8	22	Promotion to Second Division A
2	Port Fouad	10	6	2	2	18	9	+9	20	
3	Team FC	10	5	3	2	19	13	+6	18	
4	Al Obour	10	4	3	3	11	12	−1	15	
5	Al Nasr	10	1	1	8	9	19	−10	4 (Note: Teams are ranked on head-to-head record.)	
6	Gomhoriat Shebin	10	1	1	8	7	19	−12	4	

Source: Kora B
Rules for classification: 1) Points; 2) Head-to-head points; 3) Head-to-head goal difference; 4) Goal difference; 5) Goals scored; 6) Play-off tie.
(P) Promoted

===== Promotion Group C =====
Pos	Team	Pld	W	D	L	GF	GA	GD	Pts	Promotion
1	Maleyat Kafr El Zayat (P)	10	6	4	0	16	5	+11	22	Promotion to Second Division A
2	Delphi	10	5	3	2	10	8	+2	18	
3	Ala'ab Damanhour	10	3	4	3	10	8	+2	13 (Note: Teams are ranked on head-to-head record.)	
4	Olympic Club	10	3	4	3	7	8	−1	13	
5	MS Tala	10	2	4	4	11	13	−2	10	
6	MS El Kazazin	10	0	3	7	3	15	−12	3	

Source: Kora B
Rules for classification: 1) Points; 2) Head-to-head points; 3) Head-to-head goal difference; 4) Goal difference; 5) Goals scored; 6) Play-off tie.
(P) Promoted

=== Egyptian Super Cup ===
==== Final ====
24 October 2024
21:00 GST

Al Ahly	0–0 (a.e.t.)	Zamalek
	Report
Penalties
Magdy (penalty scored); Kamal (penalty scored); Attia (penalty scored); El Solia (penalty scored); Slim (penalty missed); Tau (penalty scored); Aymen (penalty missed); Attiyat Allah (penalty scored); El Shahat (penalty scored)	7–6	(penalty scored) El Said; (penalty missed) Mathlouthi; (penalty scored) Abdelmaguid; (penalty scored) Mansi; (penalty scored) Sayed; (penalty scored) Mo. Hamdy; (penalty missed) Shikabala; (penalty scored) Michalak; (penalty missed) Gaber

Mohammed bin Zayed Stadium, Abu Dhabi
Referee: Amin Omar

== Deaths ==
- 6 July 2024: Ahmed Refaat, 31, Egypt, Modern Sport, Al Masry, Al Ittihad, ENPPI and Zamalek winger.
- 20 August 2024: (Nigeria) Paul Julius, 20, Tala'ea El Gaish forward.
- 11 September 2024: Ehab Galal, 57, Egypt, Ismaily, Pharco, Pyramids, Misr Lel Makkasa, Al Masry, Zamalek, ENPPI, Telephonat Beni Suef, Kafr El Sheikh, Al Hammam and Kahraba Ismailia manager, who also played for El Qanah, Al Masry, Ismaily and El Shams.
- 11 September 2024: (Mali) Malick Touré, 28, Ghazl El Mahalla winger.
- 21 October 2024: Shehata Abdel Rahim, 80, Egypt and Al Ittihad midfielder.
- 19 November 2024: Mohamed Shawky, 29, Kafr El Sheikh, Desouk, Sporting Castle and Ghazl El Mahalla defender.
- 17 February 2025: Adel El Bably, 74, Egypt and Al Ittihad forward.
