= 2024–25 CAF Confederation Cup =

International football competition in Africa

TotalEnergies CAF Confederation Cup 2024–2025

Tournament details
- Dates: Qualification: 16 August – 22 September 2024; Competition proper: 27 November 2024 – 25 May 2025
- Teams: 52 (from 40 associations)

Final positions
- Champions: (Morocco) RS Berkane (3rd title)
- Runners-up: (Tanzania) Simba

Tournament statistics
- Matches played: 62
- Goals scored: 135 (2.18 per match)
- Top scorer(s): (Algeria) Ismaïl Belkacemi (Morocco) Oussama Lamlioui (5 goals each)
- (Note: All statistics do not include qualifying play-offs)

The 2024–25 CAF Confederation Cup, officially the TotalEnergies CAF Confederation Cup for sponsorship reasons, was the 22nd edition of the CAF Confederation Cup and 50th overall season of Africa's secondary club football tournament organized by the Confederation of African Football (CAF).

The winners, RS Berkane, earned the right to play against the winners of the 2024–25 CAF Champions League in the 2025 CAF Super Cup.

== Association team allocation ==
All 54 CAF member associations may enter the CAF Confederation Cup, with the 12 highest ranked associations according to the CAF 5-year ranking eligible to enter two teams in the competition. As a result, a maximum of 68 teams could enter the tournament – although this level has never been reached.

For this season's edition, CAF used the 2019–2024 CAF 5-year ranking, which calculates points for each entrant association based on their clubs performance over the 5 years in the CAF Champions League and the CAF Confederation Cup. The criteria for the points are as follows:

| | CAF Champions League | CAF Confederation Cup |
|---|---|---|
| Winners | 6 points | 5 points |
| Runners-up | 5 points | 4 points |
| Losing semi-finalists | 4 points | 3 points |
| Losing quarter-finalists | 3 points | 2 points |
| 3rd place in groups | 2 points | 1 point |
| 4th place in groups | 1 point | 0.5 point |

The points were multiplied by a coefficient according to the season as follows:

- 2023–24: × 5
- 2022–23: × 4
- 2021–22: × 3
- 2020–21: × 2
- 2019–20: × 1

== Teams ==
The following 52 teams from 40 associations entered the competition.

- Teams in **bold** received a bye to the second round.
- The other teams entered the first round.

Associations are shown according to their 2019–2023 CAF 5-year ranking – those with a ranking score have their rank and score (in parentheses) indicated.

Associations eligible to enter two teams (Top 12 associations)
| Association | Rank (Pts) | Team | Qualifying method |
|---|---|---|---|
| Egypt | 1 (184) | **Zamalek** | Title holders (2023–24 CAF Confederation Cup winners) |
| Egypt | 1 (184) | **Al Masry** | 2023–24 Egyptian Premier League third place after 17 rounds |
| Morocco | 2 (148) | **RS Berkane** | 2023–24 Botola third place |
| Morocco | 2 (148) | Union de Touarga | 2023–24 Botola fourth place |
| Algeria | 3 (119) | CS Constantine | 2023–24 Algerian Ligue Professionnelle 1 third place |
| Algeria | 3 (119) | **USM Alger** | 2023–24 Algerian Ligue Professionnelle 1 fourth place |
| South Africa | 4 (106) | Stellenbosch | 2023–24 South African Premier Division third place |
| South Africa | 4 (106) | **Sekhukhune United** | 2023–24 South African Premier Division fourth place |
| Tunisia | 5 (97) | **CS Sfaxien** | 2023–24 Tunisian Ligue Professionnelle 1 third place |
| Tunisia | 5 (97) | Stade Tunisien | 2023–24 Tunisian Cup winners |
| Tanzania | 6 (71) | **Simba** | 2023–24 Tanzanian Premier League third place |
| Tanzania | 6 (71) | Coastal Union | 2023–24 Tanzanian Premier League fourth place |
| DR Congo | 7 (54) | **Saint-Éloi Lupopo** | 2023–24 Linafoot third place |
| DR Congo | 7 (54) | **AS Vita Club** | 2023–24 Coupe du Congo winners |
| Angola | 8 (51.5) | Desportivo da LS | 2023–24 Girabola third place |
| Angola | 8 (51.5) | Bravos do Maquis | 2023–24 Taça de Angola runners-up |
| Libya | 10 (35) | Al Ahli Tripoli | 2023–24 Libyan Premier League third place |
| Libya | 10 (35) | Al Hilal Benghazi | 2023–24 Libyan Premier League fourth place |
| Ivory Coast | 11 (30.5) | **ASEC Mimosas** | 2023–24 Côte d'Ivoire Ligue 1 third place |
| Ivory Coast | 11 (30.5) | RC Abidjan | 2024 Coupe de Côte d'Ivoire winners |
| Nigeria | 12 (25) | **Enyimba** | 2023–24 Nigeria Premier Football League third place |
| Nigeria | 12 (25) | El Kanemi Warriors | 2024 Nigeria Federation Cup winners |

Associations eligible to enter one team
| Association | Rank (Pts) | Team | Qualifying method |
|---|---|---|---|
| Guinea | 13 (20.5) | Hafia | 2023–24 Guinée Championnat National third place |
| Ghana | 14 (20) | Nsoatreman | 2023–24 Ghana FA Cup winners |
| Mali | 15 (15) | **Stade Malien** | 2023–24 Malian Cup winners |
| Cameroon | 16 (11.5) | Fovu Club | 2024 Cameroonian Cup winners |
| Congo | 18 (9.5) | AS Otohô | 2024 Congo Premier League runners-up |
| Botswana | 19 (8) | Orapa United | 2024 Botswana FA Challenge Cup runners-up |
| Zambia | 20 (7.5) | ZESCO United | 2023–24 Zambia Super League runners-up |
| Senegal | 21 (6) | ASC Jaraaf | 2023 Senegal FA Cup winners |
| Togo | T-22 (4) | ASC Kara | 2023–24 Togolese Championnat National runners-up |
| Uganda | T-22 (4) | Kitara | 2023–24 Uganda Premier League runners-up |
| Eswatini | T-24 (1.5) | Nsingizini Hotspurs | 2023–24 Eswatini Premier League runners-up |
| Niger | T-24 (1.5) | AS FAN | 2024 Niger Cup winners |
| Burkina Faso | T-26 (1) | Étoile Filante | 2024 Coupe du Faso winners |
| Zimbabwe | T-26 (1) | Dynamos | 2024 Zimbabwe Cup winners |
| Benin | 28 (0.5) | Dadjè FC | 2024 Benin Cup winners |
| Burundi | — | Rukinzo | 2024 Burundian Cup winners |
| Chad | — | Elect Sport | 2024 Chad Premier League runners-up |
| Comoros | — | Alizé Fort | 2024 Comoros Cup runners-up |
| Equatorial Guinea | — | 15 de Agosto | 2024 Equatoguinean Cup winners |
| Ethiopia | — | Ethiopian Coffee | 2023–24 Ethiopian Premier League runners-up |
| Kenya | — | Kenya Police | 2024 FKF President's Cup winners |
| Liberia | — | Paynesville | 2024 Liberian FA Cup winners |
| Madagascar | — | Elgeco Plus | 2024 Coupe de Madagascar winners |
| Mozambique | — | Black Bulls | 2024 Taça de Moçambique winners |
| Rwanda | — | Police FC | 2024 Rwandan Cup winners |
| Seychelles | — | Foresters | 2024 Seychelles FA Cup winners |
| Sierra Leone | — | East End Lions | 2024 Sierra Leonean FA Cup winners |
| Somalia | — | Horseed | 2024 Somalia Cup winners |
| South Sudan | — | Jamus | 2024 South Sudan National Cup winners |
| Zanzibar | — | Uhamiaji | 2024 Zanzibari Cup winners |

Associations which did not enter a team

- Sudan (9 – 37 pts; eligible for two entrants)
- Mauritania (17 – 10.5 pts)
- Cape Verde
- Central African Republic
- Djibouti
- Eritrea
- Gabon
- Gambia
- Guinea-Bissau
- Lesotho
- Malawi
- Mauritius
- Namibia
- Réunion
- São Tomé and Príncipe

Notes

1. The identity of the team was not known in the draw; as the Coupe du Faso was postponed and the Burkinabé representative was yet to be determined by the time of the draw.
2. The Egyptian Premier League was not finished by the CAF deadline for associations to submit teams participating in this season's CAF competitions. As a result, Al Masry, who finished the first half of the season at third place (and were also at third place by the time of the draw) qualified for the CAF Confederation Cup.
3. The Libyan Premier League was not finished by the CAF deadline for associations to submit teams participating in this season's CAF competitions. CAF approved a request made by the Libyan Football Federation to submit the names of participating teams in the competition following the end of the season by 22 July 2024, and as a result, Libyan teams were listed as Libya 1 and Libya 2 during the draw; as their identity was still unknown by the time of the draw.

== Schedule ==
The schedule of the qualifying tournament is as follows.

| Phase | Round | Draw date | First leg | Second leg |
|---|---|---|---|---|
| Qualifying rounds | First round | 11 July 2024 | 16–18 August 2024 | 23–25 August 2024 |
| Qualifying rounds | Second round | 11 July 2024 | 13–15 September 2024 | 20–22 September 2024 |
| Group stage | Matchday 1 | 7 October 2024 | 27 November 2024 | |
| Group stage | Matchday 2 | 7 October 2024 | 8 December 2024 | |
| Group stage | Matchday 3 | 7 October 2024 | 15 December 2024 | |
| Group stage | Matchday 4 | 7 October 2024 | 5 January 2025 | |
| Group stage | Matchday 5 | 7 October 2024 | 12 January 2025 | |
| Group stage | Matchday 6 | 7 October 2024 | 19 January 2025 | |
| Knockout stage | Quarter-finals | 20 February 2025 | 2 April 2025 | 9 April 2025 |
| Knockout stage | Semi-finals | 20 February 2025 | 20 April 2025 | 27 April 2025 |
| Knockout stage | Final | 20 February 2025 | 17 May 2025 | 25 May 2025 |

== Qualifying rounds ==
The draw for the qualifying rounds was held on 11 July 2024, 12:00 GMT (15:00 local time, UTC+3), at the CAF headquarters in Cairo, Egypt. In the qualifying rounds, each tie was played on a home-and-away two-legged basis. If the aggregate score was tied after the second leg, the away goals rule was applied, and if still tied, extra time was not played, and a penalty shoot-out was used to determine the winner (Regulations III. 13 & 14).

=== First round ===
| Team 1 | Agg. | Team 2 | 1st leg | 2nd leg |
|---|---|---|---|---|
| El Kanemi Warriors (Nigeria) | 2–3 | (Benin) Dadje | 1–1 | 1–2 |
| ASC Kara (Togo) | 4–2 | (Niger) AS FAN | 2–2 | 2–0 |
| Paynesville (Liberia) | 5–0 | (Cameroon) Fovu Club | 4–0 | 1–0 |
| Hafia (Guinea) | 1–1 (a) | (Burkina Faso) Étoile Filante | 1–1 | 0–0 |
| Union de Touarga (Morocco) | 0–0 (1–2 p) | (Ivory Coast) RC Abidjan | 0–0 | 0–0 |
| East End Lions (Sierra Leone) | 0–4 | (Senegal) ASC Jaraaf | 0–1 | 0–3 |
| Administration Police (Kenya) | 1–0 | (Ethiopia) Ethiopian Coffee | 0–0 | 1–0 |
| Jamus (South Sudan) | 0–5 | (Tunisia) Stade Tunisien | 0–1 | 0–4 |
| Uhamiaji (Zanzibar) | 1–5 | (Libya) Al Ahli Tripoli | 0–2 | 1–3 |
| Kitara (Uganda) | 4–6 | (Libya) Al Hilal Benghazi | 2–3 | 2–3 |
| Horseed (Somalia) | 0–2 | (Burundi) Rukinzo | 0–0 | 0–2 |
| Nsingizini Hotspurs (Eswatini) | 0–8 | (South Africa) Stellenbosch | 0–3 | 0–5 |
| Elgeco Plus (Madagascar) | 1–1 (a) | (Angola) Desportivo da LS | 1–1 | 0–0 |
| Bravos do Maquis (Angola) | 3–0 | (Tanzania) Coastal Union | 3–0 | 0–0 |
| Alizé Fort (Comoros) | 0–11 | (Mozambique) Black Bulls | 0–7 | 0–4 |
| 15 de Agosto (Equatorial Guinea) | 1–4 | (Republic of the Congo) AS Otohô | 0–2 | 1–2 |
| Foresters (Seychelles) | 1–3 | (Botswana) Orapa United | 1–1 | 0–2 |
| Dynamos (Zimbabwe) | 1–0 | (Zambia) ZESCO United | 1–0 | 0–0 |
| Nsoatreman (Ghana) | 5–0 | (Chad) Elect Sport | 3–0 | 2–0 |
| CS Constantine (Algeria) | 4–1 | (Rwanda) Police FC | 2–0 | 2–1 |

=== Second round ===
The 16 winners of the second round advanced to the group stage.

| Team 1 | Agg. | Team 2 | 1st leg | 2nd leg |
|---|---|---|---|---|
| Dadje (Benin) | 0–7 | (Morocco) RS Berkane | 0–2 | 0–5 |
| ASC Kara (Togo) | 2–3 | (Ivory Coast) ASEC Mimosas | 2–1 | 0–2 |
| Paynesville (Liberia) | 2–3 | (Mali) Stade Malien | 1–0 | 1–3 |
| Étoile Filante (Burkina Faso) | 0–0 (2–3 p) | (Nigeria) Enyimba | 0–0 | 0–0 |
| RC Abidjan (Ivory Coast) | 0–3 | (Senegal) ASC Jaraaf | 0–0 | 0–3 |
| Administration Police (Kenya) | 1–3 | (Egypt) Zamalek | 0–1 | 1–2 |
| Stade Tunisien (Tunisia) | 1–2 | (Algeria) USM Alger | 1–0 | 0–2 |
| Al Ahli Tripoli (Libya) | 1–3 | (Tanzania) Simba | 0–0 | 1–3 |
| Al Hilal Benghazi (Libya) | 5–5 (3–5 p) | (Egypt) Al Masry | 3–2 | 2–3 |
| Rukinzo (Burundi) | 0–2 | (Tunisia) CS Sfaxien | 0–1 | 0–1 |
| Stellenbosch (South Africa) | 3–1 | (Democratic Republic of the Congo) AS Vita Club | 2–0 | 1–1 |
| Desportivo da LS (Angola) | 2–2 (a) | (South Africa) Sekhukhune United | 1–0 | 1–2 |
| Bravos do Maquis (Angola) | 3–1 | (Democratic Republic of the Congo) Saint-Éloi Lupopo | 1–0 | 2–1 |
| Black Bulls (Mozambique) | 2–2 (a) | (Republic of the Congo) AS Otohô | 1–0 | 1–2 |
| Orapa United (Botswana) | 1–1 (3–1 p) | (Zimbabwe) Dynamos | 0–1 | 1–0 |
| Nsoatreman (Ghana) | 0–3 | (Algeria) CS Constantine | 0–2 | 0–1 |

== Group stage ==
The draw for the group stage was held on 7 October 2024, 10:00 GMT (13:00 local time, UTC+3), in Cairo, Egypt. The 16 winners of the second round of qualifying rounds were drawn into four groups of four.

The teams were seeded by their performances in the CAF competitions for the previous five seasons (CAF 5-year ranking points shown next to every team). Each group contained one team from Pot 1 and one from Pot 2, with two groups including one team from Pot 3 and one from Pot 4, and the remaining two groups featuring two teams from Pot 4. Teams were allocated to positions in their respective groups according to their pot. In the group stage, each group was played on a home-and-away round-robin basis. The winners and runners-up of each group advanced to the quarter-finals of the knockout stage.

Tiebreakers
The teams were ranked according to points (3 points for a win, 1 point for a draw, 0 points for a loss). If tied on points, tiebreakers were applied in the following order (Regulations III. 20 & 21):
1. Points in head-to-head matches among tied teams;
2. Goal difference in head-to-head matches among tied teams;
3. Goals scored in head-to-head matches among tied teams;
4. Away goals scored in head-to-head matches among tied teams;
5. If more than two teams were tied, and after applying all head-to-head criteria above, a subset of teams was still tied, all head-to-head criteria above were reapplied exclusively to this subset of teams;
6. Goal difference in all group matches;
7. Goals scored in all group matches;
8. Away goals scored in all group matches;
9. Drawing of lots.

=== Group A ===
| Pos | Team | Pld | W | D | L | GF | GA | GD | Pts | Qualification | SSC | CSC | FCB | CSS |
|---|---|---|---|---|---|---|---|---|---|---|---|---|---|---|
| 1 | (Tanzania) Simba | 6 | 4 | 1 | 1 | 8 | 4 | +4 | 13 | Advance to knockout stage | — | 2–0 | 1–0 | 2–1 |
| 2 | (Algeria) CS Constantine | 6 | 4 | 0 | 2 | 12 | 6 | +6 | 12 | Advance to knockout stage | 2–1 | — | 4–0 | 3–0 |
| 3 | (Angola) Bravos do Maquis | 6 | 2 | 1 | 3 | 7 | 14 | −7 | 7 | | 1–1 | 3–2 | — | 3–2 |
| 4 | (Tunisia) CS Sfaxien | 6 | 1 | 0 | 5 | 7 | 10 | −3 | 3 | | 0–1 | 0–1 | 4–0 | — |

Source: CAF

=== Group B ===
| Pos | Team | Pld | W | D | L | GF | GA | GD | Pts | Qualification | RSB | STB | CDL | SMB |
|---|---|---|---|---|---|---|---|---|---|---|---|---|---|---|
| 1 | (Morocco) RS Berkane | 6 | 5 | 1 | 0 | 12 | 1 | +11 | 16 | Advance to knockout stage | — | 5–0 | 2–0 | 1–0 |
| 2 | (South Africa) Stellenbosch | 6 | 3 | 0 | 3 | 6 | 10 | −4 | 9 | Advance to knockout stage | 1–3 | — | 2–0 | 2–0 |
| 3 | (Angola) Desportivo da LS | 6 | 1 | 2 | 3 | 2 | 6 | −4 | 5 | | 0–0 | 0–1 | — | 1–1 |
| 4 | (Mali) Stade Malien | 6 | 1 | 1 | 4 | 3 | 6 | −3 | 4 | | 0–1 | 2–0 | 0–1 | — |

Source: CAF

=== Group C ===
| Pos | Team | Pld | W | D | L | GF | GA | GD | Pts | Qualification | USMA | ASEC | JAR | ORP |
|---|---|---|---|---|---|---|---|---|---|---|---|---|---|---|
| 1 | (Algeria) USM Alger | 6 | 4 | 2 | 0 | 14 | 2 | +12 | 14 | Advance to knockout stage | — | 3–0 | 2–0 | 6–0 |
| 2 | (Ivory Coast) ASEC Mimosas | 6 | 2 | 2 | 2 | 7 | 5 | +2 | 8 (Note: Ranked on goal difference in head-to-head matches: ASEC Mimosas +1, ASC Jaraaf –1.) | Advance to knockout stage | 1–1 | — | 2–0 | 4–0 |
| 3 | (Senegal) ASC Jaraaf | 6 | 2 | 2 | 2 | 2 | 4 | −2 | 8 | | 0–0 | 1–0 | — | 1–0 |
| 4 | (Botswana) Orapa United | 6 | 0 | 2 | 4 | 1 | 13 | −12 | 2 | | 1–2 | 0–0 | 0–0 | — |

Source: CAF

=== Group D ===
| Pos | Team | Pld | W | D | L | GF | GA | GD | Pts | Qualification | ZAM | MAS | ENY | ABB |
|---|---|---|---|---|---|---|---|---|---|---|---|---|---|---|
| 1 | (Egypt) Zamalek | 6 | 4 | 2 | 0 | 11 | 4 | +7 | 14 | Advance to knockout stage | — | 1–0 | 3–1 | 2–0 |
| 2 | (Egypt) Al Masry | 6 | 2 | 3 | 1 | 7 | 4 | +3 | 9 | Advance to knockout stage | 0–0 | — | 2–0 | 3–1 |
| 3 | (Nigeria) Enyimba | 6 | 1 | 2 | 3 | 8 | 12 | −4 | 5 | | 2–2 | 1–1 | — | 4–1 |
| 4 | (Mozambique) Black Bulls | 6 | 1 | 1 | 4 | 7 | 13 | −6 | 4 | | 1–3 | 1–1 | 3–0 | — |

Source: CAF

== Knockout stage ==
The mechanism of the draws for each round was as follows:

- In the draw for the quarter-finals, the four group winners were seeded, and the four group runners-up were unseeded. The seeded teams were drawn against the unseeded teams, with the seeded teams hosting the second leg. Teams from the same group could not be drawn against each other, while teams from the same association could be drawn against each other.
- In the draws for the semi-finals, there were no seedings, and teams from the same group or the same association could be drawn against each other. As the draws for the quarter-finals and semi-finals were held together before the quarter-finals were played, the identity of the quarter-final winners was not known at the time of the semi-final draw.

| Group | Winners | Runners-up |
|---|---|---|
| A | (Tanzania) Simba | (Algeria) CS Constantine |
| B | (Morocco) RS Berkane | (South Africa) Stellenbosch |
| C | (Algeria) USM Alger | (Ivory Coast) ASEC Mimosas |
| D | (Egypt) Zamalek | (Egypt) Al Masry |

=== Bracket ===
The bracket was decided after the draw for the knockout stage, which was held on 20 February 2025, 17:00 AST (UTC+3) at the beIN Sports headquarters in Doha, Qatar.

Quarter-finals
(Ivory Coast) ASEC Mimosas | 0 | 0 | 0
(Morocco) RS Berkane | 1 | 1 | 2
(Algeria) CS Constantine (p) | 1 | 1 | 2 (4)
(Algeria) USM Alger | 1 | 1 | 2 (3)
(Egypt) Al Masry | 2 | 0 | 2 (1)
(Tanzania) Simba (p) | 0 | 2 | 2 (4)
(South Africa) Stellenbosch | 0 | 1 | 1
(Egypt) Zamalek | 0 | 0 | 0

Semi-finals
(Morocco) RS Berkane | 4 | 0 | 4
(Algeria) CS Constantine | 0 | 1 | 1
(Tanzania) Simba | 1 | 0 | 1
(South Africa) Stellenbosch | 0 | 0 | 0

Final
(Morocco) RS Berkane | 2 | 1 | 3
(Tanzania) Simba | 0 | 1 | 1

=== Quarter-finals ===
| Team 1 | Agg. | Team 2 | 1st leg | 2nd leg |
|---|---|---|---|---|
| Stellenbosch (South Africa) | 1–0 | (Egypt) Zamalek | 0–0 | 1–0 |
| ASEC Mimosas (Ivory Coast) | 0–2 | (Morocco) RS Berkane | 0–1 | 0–1 |
| CS Constantine (Algeria) | 2–2 (4–3 p) | (Algeria) USM Alger | 1–1 | 1–1 |
| Al Masry (Egypt) | 2–2 (1–4 p) | (Tanzania) Simba | 2–0 | 0–2 |

=== Semi-finals ===
| Team 1 | Agg. | Team 2 | 1st leg | 2nd leg |
|---|---|---|---|---|
| RS Berkane (Morocco) | 4–1 | (Algeria) CS Constantine | 4–0 | 0–1 |
| Simba (Tanzania) | 1–0 | (South Africa) Stellenbosch | 1–0 | 0–0 |

=== Final ===
The first leg was played on 17 May, and the second leg was played on 25 May 2025.

| Team 1 | Agg. | Team 2 | 1st leg | 2nd leg |
|---|---|---|---|---|
| RS Berkane (Morocco) | 3–1 | (Tanzania) Simba | 2–0 | 1–1 |

17 May 2025
20:00 UTC+1

| RS Berkane (Morocco) | 2–0 | (Tanzania) Simba |
|---|---|---|
| Camara 8'; Lamlioui 14' | Report |

Berkane Municipal Stadium, Berkane
Attendance: 10,000
Referee: Pierre Atcho (Gabon)
25 May 2025
16:00 UTC+3

| Simba (Tanzania) | 1–1 | (Morocco) RS Berkane |
|---|---|---|
| Mutale 17' | Report | Sidibe 90+3' |

Amaan Stadium, Zanzibar City (Zanzibar)
Attendance: 15,000
Referee: Dahane Beida (Mauritania)

== Top goalscorers ==
Team eliminated / inactive for this round.

| Rank | Player | Team | MD1 | MD2 | MD3 | MD4 | MD5 | MD6 | QF1 | QF2 | SF1 | SF2 | F1 | F2 | Total |
|---|---|---|---|---|---|---|---|---|---|---|---|---|---|---|---|
| 1 | (Morocco) Oussama Lamlioui | (Morocco) RS Berkane | | | | | | 1 | | 1 | 2 | | 1 | | 5 |
| 1 | (Algeria) Ismaïl Belkacemi | (Algeria) USM Alger | 2 | | 2 | | | 1 | | | | | | | 5 |
| 3 | (Nigeria) Ifeanyi Ihemekwele | (Nigeria) Enyimba | | 1 | | 1 | 1 | 1 | | | | | | | 4 |
| 4 | (Burkina Faso) Issoufou Dayo | (Morocco) RS Berkane | 2 | | 1 | | | | | | | | | | 3 |
| 4 | (Morocco) Youssef Zghoudi | (Morocco) RS Berkane | | 2 | | | | 1 | | | | | | | 3 |
| 4 | (Senegal) Paul Bassène | (Morocco) RS Berkane | | | | | | 2 | | | 1 | | | | 3 |
| 4 | (Tanzania) Kibu Denis | (Tanzania) Simba | | | 2 | | | 1 | | | | | | | 3 |
| 4 | (Tunisia) Fakhreddine Ben Youssef | (Egypt) Al Masry | | | | | | 3 | | | | | | | 3 |
| 4 | (Tunisia) Seifeddine Jaziri | (Egypt) Zamalek | | 1 | | | | 2 | | | | | | | 3 |

== See also ==
- 2024–25 CAF Champions League
- 2024 CAF Women's Champions League
- 2025 CAF Super Cup
