= 2024–25 CAF Confederation Cup knockout stage =

International football competition in Africa

- Dates: 2 April – 25 May 2025

Tournament statistics
- Matches played: 14
- Goals scored: 21 (1.5 per match)

The 2024–25 CAF Confederation Cup knockout stage started on 2 April with the quarter-finals and ended on 25 May 2025 with the second leg of the final to decide the champions of the 2024–25 CAF Confederation Cup. 8 teams competed in the knockout stage.

Times are local.

== Round and draw dates ==
The schedule was as follows.

Round	Draw date	First leg	Second leg
Quarter-finals	20 February 2025	2 April 2025	9 April 2025
Semi-finals	20 February 2025	20 April 2025	27 April 2025
Final	20 February 2025	17 May 2025	25 May 2025

== Format ==
Each tie in the knockout phase was played over two legs, with each team playing one leg at home. The team that scored more goals on aggregate over the two legs advanced to the next round. If the aggregate score is level, the away goals rule was applied, i.e. the team that scored more goals away from home over the two legs advanced. If away goals were also equal, then extra time was not played and the winners were decided by a penalty shoot-out (Regulations III. 26 & 27). The mechanism of the draws for each round was as follows:

- In the draw for the quarter-finals, the four group winners were seeded, and the four group runners-up were unseeded. The seeded teams were drawn against the unseeded teams, with the seeded teams hosting the second leg. Teams from the same group could not be drawn against each other, while teams from the same association could be drawn against each other.
- In the draws for the semi-finals, there were no seedings, and teams from the same group or the same association could be drawn against each other. As the draws for the quarter-finals and semi-finals were held together before the quarter-finals were played, the identity of the quarter-final winners was not known at the time of the semi-final draw.

== Qualified teams ==
The knockout stage involved the 8 teams qualifying as winners and runners-up of each of the eight groups in the group stage.

Group	Winners	Runners-up
A	(Tanzania) Simba	(Algeria) CS Constantine
B	(Morocco) RS Berkane	(South Africa) Stellenbosch
C	(Algeria) USM Alger	(Ivory Coast) ASEC Mimosas
D	(Egypt) Zamalek	(Egypt) Al Masry

== Bracket ==
The bracket of the knockout stage was determined as follows:

Round	Matchups
Quarter-finals	(Group winners hosted the second leg, matchups decided by draw, teams from same group cannot play each other): QF1; QF2; QF3; QF4
Semi-finals	(Matchups and order of legs decided by draw, between winners QF1, QF2, QF3, QF4): SF1; SF2
Final	Winners SF1 and SF2 faced each other in two legs to decide the champions

The bracket was decided after the draw for the knockout stage, which was held on 20 February 2025, 17:00 AST (UTC+3) at the beIN Sports headquarters in Doha, Qatar.

Quarter-finals
(Ivory Coast) ASEC Mimosas	0	0	0
(Morocco) RS Berkane	1	1	2
(Algeria) CS Constantine (p)	1	1	2 (4)
(Algeria) USM Alger	1	1	2 (3)
(Egypt) Al Masry	2	0	2 (1)
(Tanzania) Simba (p)	0	2	2 (4)
(South Africa) Stellenbosch	0	1	1
(Egypt) Zamalek	0	0	0

Semi-finals
(Morocco) RS Berkane	4	0	4
(Algeria) CS Constantine	0	1	1
(Tanzania) Simba	1	0	1
(South Africa) Stellenbosch	0	0	0

Final
(Morocco) RS Berkane	2	1	3
(Tanzania) Simba	0	1	1

== Quarter-finals ==
The draw for the quarter-finals was held on 20 February 2025.

=== Summary ===
The first legs were played on 2 April, and the second legs were played on 9 April 2025.

Team 1	Agg.	Team 2	1st leg	2nd leg
Stellenbosch (South Africa)	1–0	(Egypt) Zamalek	0–0	1–0
ASEC Mimosas (Ivory Coast)	0–2	(Morocco) RS Berkane	0–1	0–1
CS Constantine (Algeria)	2–2 (4–3 p)	(Algeria) USM Alger	1–1	1–1
Al Masry (Egypt)	2–2 (1–4 p)	(Tanzania) Simba	2–0	0–2

=== Matches ===
2 April 2025
15:00 UTC+2

Stellenbosch (South Africa)	0–0	(Egypt) Zamalek
	Report

Cape Town Stadium, Cape Town
Referee: Tanguy Mebiame (Gabon)
9 April 2025
18:00 UTC+2

Zamalek (Egypt)	0–1	(South Africa) Stellenbosch
	Report	Nduli 79'

Cairo International Stadium, Cairo
Referee: Bamlak Tessema Weyesa (Ethiopia)

Stellenbosch won 1–0 on aggregate.

2 April 2025
16:00 UTC+0

ASEC Mimosas (Ivory Coast)	0–1	(Morocco) RS Berkane
	Report	Riahi 75'

Felix Houphouet Boigny Stadium, Abidjan
Referee: Pacifique Ndabihawenimana (Burundi)
9 April 2025
20:00 UTC+1

RS Berkane (Morocco)	1–0	(Ivory Coast) ASEC Mimosas
Lamlioui 76'	Report

Berkane Municipal Stadium, Berkane
Referee: Abongile Tom (South Africa)

RS Berkane won 2–0 on aggregate.

2 April 2025
17:00 UTC+1

CS Constantine (Algeria)	1–1	(Algeria) USM Alger
Temine 29'	Report	Mondeko 73'

Chahid Hamlaoui Stadium, Constantine
Referee: Dahane Beida (Mauritania)
9 April 2025
20:00 UTC+1

USM Alger (Algeria)	1–1	(Algeria) CS Constantine
Alilet 25' (pen.)	Report	Belhocini 56'
Penalties
Alilet (penalty missed); Mondeko (penalty scored); Mahrouz (penalty missed); Terrazas (penalty scored); Ghacha (penalty scored)	3–4	(penalty scored) Dib; (penalty scored) Boudrama; (penalty missed) Merbah; (penalty scored) Temine; (penalty scored) Bouguerra

Stade du 5 Juillet, Algiers
Referee: Amin Omar (Egypt)

2–2 on aggregate. CS Constantine won 4–3 on penalties.

2 April 2025
18:00 UTC+2

Al Masry (Egypt)	2–0	(Tanzania) Simba
Deghmoum 16'; Ebuka 89'	Report

Suez Stadium, Suez
Referee: Boubou Traoré (Mali)
9 April 2025
16:00 UTC+3

Simba (Tanzania)	2–0	(Egypt) Al Masry
Mpanzu 22'; Mukwala 32'	Report
Penalties
Ahoua (penalty scored); Mukwala (penalty scored); Denis (penalty scored); Kapombe (penalty scored)	4–1	(penalty missed) Gaber; (penalty scored) Ben Youssef; (penalty missed) Hamada

Benjamin Mkapa Stadium, Dar es Salaam
Referee: Djindo Louis Houngnandande (Benin)

2–2 on aggregate. Simba won 4–1 on penalties.

== Semi-finals ==
The draw for the semi-finals was held on 20 February 2025 (after the quarter-finals draw).

=== Summary ===
The first legs were played on 20 April, and the second legs were played on 27 April 2025.

Team 1	Agg.	Team 2	1st leg	2nd leg
RS Berkane (Morocco)	4–1	(Algeria) CS Constantine	4–0	0–1
Simba (Tanzania)	1–0	(South Africa) Stellenbosch	1–0	0–0

=== Matches ===
20 April 2025
20:00 UTC+1

RS Berkane (Morocco)	4–0	(Algeria) CS Constantine
Mehri 1'; Bassène 21'; Lamlioui 54', 90+2'	Report

Berkane Municipal Stadium, Berkane
Referee: Mutaz Ibrahim (Libya)
27 April 2025
17:00 UTC+1

CS Constantine (Algeria)	1–0	(Morocco) RS Berkane
Belhocini 47'	Report

Chahid Hamlaoui Stadium, Constantine
Referee: Mahmood Ismail (Sudan)

RS Berkane won 4–1 on aggregate.

20 April 2025
16:00 UTC+3

Simba (Tanzania)	1–0	(South Africa) Stellenbosch
Ahoua 45+2'	Report

Amaan Stadium, Zanzibar City (Zanzibar)
Referee: Jean-Jacques Ndala Ngambo (DR Congo)
27 April 2025
15:00 UTC+2

Stellenbosch (South Africa)	0–0	(Tanzania) Simba
	Report

Moses Mabhida Stadium, Durban
Referee: Mohamed Maarouf (Egypt)

Simba won 1–0 on aggregate.

== Final ==
The first leg was played on 17 May, and the second leg was played on 25 May 2025.

Team 1	Agg.	Team 2	1st leg	2nd leg
RS Berkane (Morocco)	3–1	(Tanzania) Simba	2–0	1–1

17 May 2025
20:00 UTC+1

RS Berkane (Morocco)	2–0	(Tanzania) Simba
Camara 8'; Lamlioui 14'	Report

Berkane Municipal Stadium, Berkane
Attendance: 10,000
Referee: Pierre Atcho (Gabon)
25 May 2025
16:00 UTC+3

Simba (Tanzania)	1–1	(Morocco) RS Berkane
Mutale 17'	Report	Sidibe 90+3'

Amaan Stadium, Zanzibar City (Zanzibar)
Attendance: 15,000
Referee: Dahane Beida (Mauritania)

== See also ==
- 2024–25 CAF Champions League knockout stage
