= 2024–25 CAF Confederation Cup group stage =

International football competition in Africa

- Dates: 27 November 2024 – 19 January 2025

Tournament statistics
- Matches played: 48
- Goals scored: 114 (2.38 per match)

The 2024–25 CAF Confederation Cup group stage began on 27 November 2024 and ended on 19 January 2025. 16 teams competed in the group stage to decide the eight places in the knockout stage of the 2024–25 CAF Confederation Cup.

== Draw ==
The draw for the group stage was held on 7 October 2024, 10:00 GMT (13:00 local time, UTC+3), in Cairo, Egypt. The 16 winners of the second round of qualifying rounds were drawn into four groups of four.

The teams were seeded by their performances in the CAF competitions for the previous five seasons (CAF 5-year ranking points shown next to every team). Each group contained one team from Pot 1 and one from Pot 2, with two groups including one team from Pot 3 and one from Pot 4, and the remaining two groups featuring two teams from Pot 4. Teams were allocated to positions in their respective groups according to their pot.

Pot 1
Team	Pts
(Egypt) Zamalek	48
(Morocco) RS Berkane	42
(Tanzania) Simba	39
(Algeria) USM Alger	36

Pot 2
Team	Pts
(Ivory Coast) ASEC Mimosas	30
(Mali) Stade Malien	10
(Egypt) Al Masry	8
(Tunisia) CS Sfaxien	7

Pot 3
Team	Pts
(Nigeria) Enyimba	6
(Senegal) ASC Jaraaf	4

Pot 4

Team	Pts
(Algeria) CS Constantine	—
(Angola) Bravos do Maquis	—
(Angola) Lunda Sul	—

Team	Pts
(Botswana) Orapa United	—
(Mozambique) Black Bulls	—
(South Africa) Stellenbosch	—

== Format ==
In the group stage, each group was played on a home-and-away round-robin basis. The winners and runners-up of each group advanced to the quarter-finals of the knockout stage.

=== Tiebreakers ===
The teams were ranked according to points (3 points for a win, 1 point for a draw, 0 points for a loss). If tied on points, tiebreakers were applied in the following order (Regulations III. 20 & 21):

1. Points in head-to-head matches among tied teams;
2. Goal difference in head-to-head matches among tied teams;
3. Goals scored in head-to-head matches among tied teams;
4. Away goals scored in head-to-head matches among tied teams;
5. If more than two teams were tied, and after applying all head-to-head criteria above, a subset of teams was still tied, all head-to-head criteria above were reapplied exclusively to this subset of teams;
6. Goal difference in all group matches;
7. Goals scored in all group matches;
8. Away goals scored in all group matches;
9. Drawing of lots.

== Schedule ==
The schedule of each matchday was as follows.

Matchday	Dates	Matches
Matchday 1	28 November 2024	Team 1 vs. Team 4, Team 2 vs. Team 3
Matchday 2	8 December 2024	Team 3 vs. Team 1, Team 4 vs. Team 2
Matchday 3	15 December 2024	Team 4 vs. Team 3, Team 1 vs. Team 2
Matchday 4	5 January 2025	Team 3 vs. Team 4, Team 2 vs. Team 1
Matchday 5	12 January 2025	Team 4 vs. Team 1, Team 3 vs. Team 2
Matchday 6	19 January 2025	Team 1 vs. Team 3, Team 2 vs. Team 4

== Groups ==
All times are local.

=== Group A ===
Pos	Team	Pld	W	D	L	GF	GA	GD	Pts	Qualification	SSC	CSC	FCB	CSS
1	(Tanzania) Simba	6	4	1	1	8	4	+4	13	Advance to knockout stage	—	2–0	1–0	2–1
2	(Algeria) CS Constantine	6	4	0	2	12	6	+6	12	Advance to knockout stage	2–1	—	4–0	3–0
3	(Angola) Bravos do Maquis	6	2	1	3	7	14	−7	7		1–1	3–2	—	3–2
4	(Tunisia) CS Sfaxien	6	1	0	5	7	10	−3	3		0–1	0–1	4–0	—

Source: CAF
Rules for classification: Group stage tiebreakers
27 November 2024
16:00 UTC+3

Simba (Tanzania)	1–0	(Angola) Bravos do Maquis
Ahoua 27' (pen.)	Report

Benjamin Mkapa Stadium, Dar es Salaam
Referee: Mutaz Ibrahim (Libya)
27 November 2024
17:00 UTC+1

CS Sfaxien (Tunisia)	0–1	(Algeria) CS Constantine
	Report	Dib 81'

Hammadi Agrebi Stadium, Tunis
Referee: Mahmoud El Banna (Egypt)

8 December 2024
17:00 UTC+1

CS Constantine (Algeria)	2–1	(Tanzania) Simba
Hamza 46' (o.g.); Dib 50'	Report	Husseini 24'

Chahid Hamlaoui Stadium, Constantine
Referee: Godfrey Nkhakananga (Malawi)
8 December 2024
17:00 UTC+1

Bravos do Maquis (Angola)	3–2	(Tunisia) CS Sfaxien
Mosiatlhaga 27'; Paciência 39'; Macaiabo 45+2'	Report	Cristo 29'; Haj Hassen 47'

Estádio 11 de Novembro, Luanda
Referee: Tanguy Mebiame (Gabon)

15 December 2024
16:00 UTC+3

Simba (Tanzania)	2–1	(Tunisia) CS Sfaxien
Denis 7', 90+9'	Report	Haj Hassen 3'

Benjamin Mkapa Stadium, Dar es Salaam
Referee: Andofetra Rakotojaona (Madagascar)
15 December 2024
17:00 UTC+1

Bravos do Maquis (Angola)	3–2	(Algeria) CS Constantine
Paciência 17' (pen.); Francis 21'; Célio 90+4'	Report	Mouaki 63'; Bellaouel 79'

Estádio 11 de Novembro, Luanda
Referee: Peter Waweru (Kenya)

5 January 2025
17:00 UTC+1

CS Sfaxien (Tunisia)	0–1	(Tanzania) Simba
	Report	Ahoua 34'

Hammadi Agrebi Stadium, Tunis
Referee: Daouda Guèye (Senegal)
5 January 2025
20:00 UTC+1

CS Constantine (Algeria)	4–0	(Angola) Bravos do Maquis
Rebiaï 41'; Omoyele 45+1'; Belhocini 86'; Mouaki 89'	Report

Chahid Hamlaoui Stadium, Constantine
Referee: Issa Mouhamed (Benin)

12 January 2025
17:00 UTC+1

Bravos do Maquis (Angola)	1–1	(Tanzania) Simba
Mosiatlhaga 13'	Report	Ateba 69'

Estádio 11 de Novembro, Luanda
Referee: Jean Ouattara (Burkina Faso)
12 January 2025
17:00 UTC+1

CS Constantine (Algeria)	3–0	(Tunisia) CS Sfaxien
Benchaâ 30', 70'; Temine 90+4'	Report

Chahid Hamlaoui Stadium, Constantine
Referee: Amin Omar (Egypt)

19 January 2025
16:00 UTC+3

Simba (Tanzania)	2–0	(Algeria) CS Constantine
Denis 61'; Ateba 79'	Report

Benjamin Mkapa Stadium, Dar es Salaam
Referee: Celso Alvação (Mozambique)
19 January 2025
14:00 UTC+1

CS Sfaxien (Tunisia)	4–0	(Angola) Bravos do Maquis
Nasraoui 3'; Sekkouhi 33'; Neves 54' (o.g.); Samy 90+5' (o.g.)	Report

Hammadi Agrebi Stadium, Tunis
Referee: Younoussa Camara (Guinea)

=== Group B ===
Pos	Team	Pld	W	D	L	GF	GA	GD	Pts	Qualification	RSB	STB	CDL	SMB
1	(Morocco) RS Berkane	6	5	1	0	12	1	+11	16	Advance to knockout stage	—	5–0	2–0	1–0
2	(South Africa) Stellenbosch	6	3	0	3	6	10	−4	9	Advance to knockout stage	1–3	—	2–0	2–0
3	(Angola) Desportivo da LS	6	1	2	3	2	6	−4	5		0–0	0–1	—	1–1
4	(Mali) Stade Malien	6	1	1	4	3	6	−3	4		0–1	2–0	0–1	—

Source: CAF
Rules for classification: Group stage tiebreakers
27 November 2024
16:00 UTC+0

Stade Malien (Mali)	2–0	(South Africa) Stellenbosch
Mandjan 15'; D. Coulibaly 90+6' (pen.)	Report

Stade du 26 Mars, Bamako
Referee: Mehrez Melki (Tunisia)
27 November 2024
20:00 UTC+1

RS Berkane (Morocco)	2–0	(Angola) Desportivo da LS
Dayo 21', 79'	Report

Berkane Municipal Stadium, Berkane
Referee: Messie Nkounkou (Congo)

8 December 2024
15:00 UTC+2

Stellenbosch (South Africa)	1–3	(Morocco) RS Berkane
Butsaka 87'	Report	Zghoudi 5', 15'; Hajji 83'

Moses Mabhida Stadium, Durban
Referee: Issa Sy (Senegal)
8 December 2024
14:00 UTC+1

Desportivo da LS (Angola)	1–1	(Mali) Stade Malien
Danilson 74'	Report	S. Diaby 69'

Estádio 11 de Novembro, Luanda
Referee: Issa Mouhamed (Benin)

15 December 2024
14:00 UTC+1

Desportivo da LS (Angola)	0–1	(South Africa) Stellenbosch
	Report	Titus 89'

Estádio 11 de Novembro, Luanda
Referee: Abdulrazg Ahmed (Libya)
15 December 2024
20:00 UTC+1

RS Berkane (Morocco)	1–0	(Mali) Stade Malien
Dayo 86' (pen.)	Report

Berkane Municipal Stadium, Berkane
Referee: Jean-Jacques Ndala Ngambo (DR Congo)

5 January 2025
18:00 UTC+2

Stellenbosch (South Africa)	2–0	(Angola) Desportivo da LS
De Jong 50', 65' (pen.)	Report

Loftus Versfeld Stadium, Pretoria
Referee: Hillary Hambaba (Zambia)
5 January 2025
19:00 UTC+0

Stade Malien (Mali)	0–1	(Morocco) RS Berkane
	Report	Riahi 64'

Stade du 26 Mars, Bamako
Referee: Bamlak Tessema Weyesa (Ethiopia)

12 January 2025
14:00 UTC+1

Desportivo da LS (Angola)	0–0	(Morocco) RS Berkane
	Report

Estádio 11 de Novembro, Luanda
Referee: Pacifique Ndabihawenimana (Burundi)
12 January 2025
15:00 UTC+2

Stellenbosch (South Africa)	2–0	(Mali) Stade Malien
Basadien 30' (pen.); Adams 39'	Report

Loftus Versfeld Stadium, Pretoria
Referee: Yannick Malala (DR Congo)

19 January 2025
20:00 UTC+1

RS Berkane (Morocco)	5–0	(South Africa) Stellenbosch
Lamlioui 7'; Mehri 15'; Bassène 66', 84'; Zghoudi 80'	Report

Berkane Municipal Stadium, Berkane
Referee: Ahmed Arajiga (Tanzania)
19 January 2025
19:00 UTC+0

Stade Malien (Mali)	0–1	(Angola) Desportivo da LS
	Report	Joca 24'

Stade du 26 Mars, Bamako
Referee: Mustapha Ghorbal (Algeria)

=== Group C ===
Pos	Team	Pld	W	D	L	GF	GA	GD	Pts	Qualification	USMA	ASEC	JAR	ORP
1	(Algeria) USM Alger	6	4	2	0	14	2	+12	14	Advance to knockout stage	—	3–0	2–0	6–0
2	(Ivory Coast) ASEC Mimosas	6	2	2	2	7	5	+2	8 (Note: Ranked on goal difference in head-to-head matches: ASEC Mimosas +1, ASC Jaraaf –1.)	Advance to knockout stage	1–1	—	2–0	4–0
3	(Senegal) ASC Jaraaf	6	2	2	2	2	4	−2	8		0–0	1–0	—	1–0
4	(Botswana) Orapa United	6	0	2	4	1	13	−12	2		1–2	0–0	0–0	—

Source: CAF
Rules for classification: Group stage tiebreakers
Notes:
27 November 2024
16:00 UTC+0

ASEC Mimosas (Ivory Coast)	2–0	(Senegal) ASC Jaraaf
Cissé 45'; Tshisungu 71'	Report

Felix Houphouet Boigny Stadium, Abidjan
Referee: Celso Armindo Alvação (Mozambique)
27 November 2024
20:00 UTC+1

USM Alger (Algeria)	6–0	(Botswana) Orapa United
Belkacemi 4', 15'; Radouani 34'; Musa Alli 45+1'; Lamara 48'; Merili 71'	Report

Stade du 5 Juillet, Algiers
Referee: Lamin Jammeh (Gambia)

8 December 2024
15:00 UTC+2

Orapa United (Botswana)	0–0	(Ivory Coast) ASEC Mimosas
	Report

Obed Itani Chilume Stadium, Francistown
Referee: Abdou Abdel Mefire (Cameroon)
8 December 2024
16:00 UTC+0

ASC Jaraaf (Senegal)	0–0	(Algeria) USM Alger
	Report

Diamniadio Olympic Stadium, Dakar
Referee: Samuel Uwikunda (Rwanda)

15 December 2024
15:00 UTC+2

Orapa United (Botswana)	0–0	(Senegal) ASC Jaraaf
	Report

Obed Itani Chilume Stadium, Francistown
Referee: Yannick Malala (DR Congo)
15 December 2024
20:00 UTC+1

USM Alger (Algeria)	3–0	(Ivory Coast) ASEC Mimosas
Yabré 16' (o.g.); Belkacemi 41' (pen.), 54'	Report

Stade du 5 Juillet, Algiers
Referee: Abdoulaye Manet (Guinea)

5 January 2025
16:00 UTC+0

ASC Jaraaf (Senegal)	1–0	(Botswana) Orapa United
A. Fall 90+8'	Report

Diamniadio Olympic Stadium, Dakar
Referee: Tanguy Mebiame (Gabon)
5 January 2025
16:00 UTC+0

ASEC Mimosas (Ivory Coast)	1–1	(Algeria) USM Alger
Diarrassouba 31'	Report	Benmazouz 71'

Felix Houphouet Boigny Stadium, Abidjan
Referee: Jean Pierre Nguiene (Congo)

12 January 2025
15:00 UTC+2

Orapa United (Botswana)	1–2	(Algeria) USM Alger
Moloi 90+5'	Report	Gassama 14'; Ghacha 60'

Obed Itani Chilume Stadium, Francistown
Referee: Joseph Ogabor (Nigeria)
12 January 2025
16:00 UTC+0

ASC Jaraaf (Senegal)	1–0	(Ivory Coast) ASEC Mimosas
Oualy 26'	Report

Diamniadio Olympic Stadium, Dakar
Referee: Jelly Alfred Chavani (South Africa)

19 January 2025
20:00 UTC+1

USM Alger (Algeria)	2–0	(Senegal) ASC Jaraaf
Belkacemi 81'; Radouani 90+9'	Report

Stade du 5 Juillet, Algiers
Referee: Aklesso Gnama (Togo)
19 January 2025
19:00 UTC+0

ASEC Mimosas (Ivory Coast)	4–0	(Botswana) Orapa United
Ecua 36', 64'; Dagrou 79'; Diarrassouba 90+2'	Report

Felix Houphouet Boigny Stadium, Abidjan
Referee: Lamin Jammeh (Gambia)

=== Group D ===
Pos	Team	Pld	W	D	L	GF	GA	GD	Pts	Qualification	ZAM	MAS	ENY	ABB
1	(Egypt) Zamalek	6	4	2	0	11	4	+7	14	Advance to knockout stage	—	1–0	3–1	2–0
2	(Egypt) Al Masry	6	2	3	1	7	4	+3	9	Advance to knockout stage	0–0	—	2–0	3–1
3	(Nigeria) Enyimba	6	1	2	3	8	12	−4	5		2–2	1–1	—	4–1
4	(Mozambique) Black Bulls	6	1	1	4	7	13	−6	4		1–3	1–1	3–0	—

Source: CAF
Rules for classification: Group stage tiebreakers
27 November 2024
18:00 UTC+2

Al Masry (Egypt)	2–0	(Nigeria) Enyimba
Hamada 5', 74'	Report

Suez Canal Stadium, Ismailia
Referee: Boubou Traoré (Mali)
27 November 2024
21:00 UTC+2

Zamalek (Egypt)	2–0	(Mozambique) Black Bulls
Abdel Rahim 45'; Donga 50'	Report

Cairo International Stadium, Cairo
Referee: Mohamed Diraneh Guedi (Djibouti)

8 December 2024
17:00 UTC+1

Enyimba (Nigeria)	2–2	(Egypt) Zamalek
Ihemekwele 45+4'; Chinedu 57'	Report	Jaziri 33'; Faraj 40'

Godswill Akpabio International Stadium, Uyo
Referee: Jean Claude Ishimwe (Rwanda)
8 December 2024
21:00 UTC+2

Black Bulls (Mozambique)	1–1	(Egypt) Al Masry
Nené 90+2'	Report	Gaber 10'

Estádio do Zimpeto, Maputo
Referee: Joseph Odey Ogabor (Nigeria)

15 December 2024
15:00 UTC+2

Black Bulls (Mozambique)	3–0	(Nigeria) Enyimba
Akporoh 16'; Fidel 57'; Abubakar 64'	Report

Estádio do Zimpeto, Maputo
Referee: Bamlak Tessema Weyesa (Ethiopia)
15 December 2024
18:00 UTC+2

Zamalek (Egypt)	1–0	(Egypt) Al Masry
Zizo 63'	Report

Borg El Arab Stadium, Alexandria
Referee: Mustapha Ghorbal (Algeria)

5 January 2025
17:00 UTC+1

Enyimba (Nigeria)	4–1	(Mozambique) Black Bulls
Atule 6', 90'; Ihemekwele 45'; Ideye 67'	Report	Ifoni 12'

Godswill Akpabio International Stadium, Uyo
Referee: Mehrez Melki (Tunisia)
5 January 2025
18:00 UTC+2

Al Masry (Egypt)	0–0	(Egypt) Zamalek
	Report

Borg El Arab Stadium, Alexandria
Referee: Lahlou Benbraham (Algeria)

12 January 2025
18:00 UTC+2

Black Bulls (Mozambique)	1–3	(Egypt) Zamalek
Ifoni 62'	Report	Ashraf 51', 53'; Zizo 82'

Cairo International Stadium, Cairo (Egypt)
Referee: Fabricio Duarte (Cape Verde)
12 January 2025
17:00 UTC+1

Enyimba (Nigeria)	1–1	(Egypt) Al Masry
Ihemekwele 47'	Report	Hashem 8'

Godswill Akpabio International Stadium, Uyo
Referee: Omar Artan (Somalia)

19 January 2025
18:00 UTC+2

Zamalek (Egypt)	3–1	(Nigeria) Enyimba
Shalaby 29'; Jaziri 48', 87'	Report	Ihemekwele 57'

Cairo International Stadium, Cairo
Referee: Pierre Atcho (Gabon)
19 January 2025
18:00 UTC+2

Al Masry (Egypt)	3–1	(Mozambique) Black Bulls
Ben Youssef 22', 42', 45'	Report	Akporoh 57'

Borg El Arab Stadium, Alexandria
Referee: Jeannot Franck Bito (Cameroon)

== See also ==
- 2024–25 CAF Champions League group stage
