= 2021–22 Girabola =

Girabola
- Season: 2021–22
- Champions: Petro de Luanda

The 2021–22 Girabola was the 44th season of top-tier football in Angola. The season ran from October 1, 2021 until May 2022.

The league comprised 16 teams, the bottom three of which were relegated to the 2022–23 Provincial stages.

The winner and runner-up qualified to the 2022–23 CAF Champions League qualifications round.

== League table ==
Pos	Team	Pld	W	D	L	GF	GA	GD	Pts	Qualification or relegation
1	Petro de Luanda (C)	30	23	6	1	74	17	+57	75	Qualification for Champions League
2	Primeiro de Agosto	30	18	7	5	55	21	+34	61	Qualification for Champions League
3	Sagrada Esperança	30	18	6	6	49	22	+27	60	Qualification for Confederation Cup
4	Interclube	30	14	8	8	41	28	+13	50	
5	Bravos do Maquis	30	12	10	8	34	31	+3	46	
6	Desportivo da Huíla	30	12	9	9	40	34	+6	45	
7	Recreativo da Caála	30	11	9	10	30	19	+11	42	
8	Académica do Lobito	30	10	10	10	38	31	+7	40	
9	Recreativo do Libolo	30	9	10	11	28	31	−3	37	
10	Cuando Cubango FC	30	9	9	12	22	33	−11	36	
11	Wiliete SC	30	7	13	10	38	40	−2	34	
12	Sporting de Cabinda	30	8	9	13	20	37	−17	33	
13	Desportivo da Lunda Sul	30	6	14	10	24	30	−6	32	
14	Kabuscorp	30	6	11	13	31	40	−9	29	Relegation to Provincial stages
15	Progresso do Sambizanga	30	4	7	19	22	61	−39	19	Relegation to Provincial stages
16	Sporting de Benguela	30	1	6	23	15	86	−71	9	Relegation to Provincial stages

Updated to match(es) played on May 29 2022. Source: Girabola.com Girabola, SOCCERWAY
Rules for classification: 1) Points; 2) Head-to-head points; 3) Goal difference; 4) Head-to-head goal difference; 5) Goals scored; 6) Fair-play points; 7) Play-off.
(C) Champions

== Results ==
Home \ Away	ACA	BMQ	CCU	DHL	DLS	INT	KAB	PET	PRI	PRO	RCA	RLB	SAG	SBE	SCC	WIL
Académica do Lobito	—	3–2	2–2	0–0	1–1	1–1	2–0	1–1	0–1	5–0	1–0	1–2	2–0	2–1	3–0 (Note: Académica do Lobito was awarded a 3–0 win)	0–2
Bravos do Maquis	2–0	—	0–0	3–3	2–1	0–0	2–0	2–3	1–2	2–1	2–1	0–3	1–0	2–0	0–0	1–1
Cuando Cubango FC	1–0	1–1	—	0–2	0–0	1–0	0–0	0–2	0–0	2–1	1–0	1–0	0–1	5–0	0–1	0–1
Desportivo da Huíla	2–1	0–0	2–0	—	1–1	1–0	1–1	1–4	2–1	3–0 (Note: Desportivo da Huíla was awarded a 3–0 win)	0–1	2–0	1–2	1–1	1–0	3–1
Desportivo da Lunda Sul	1–1	0–1	0–1	2–1	—	0–2	0–0	1–3	1–2	2–0	1–0	0–0	0–0	1–0	1–1	2–2
Interclube	2–3	2–0	1–0	1–2	2–1	—	2–1	1–1	1–2	4–0	1–0	1–1	1–2	4–0	2–1	1–1
Kabuscorp	1–2	2–2	2–0	1–1	0–1	0–1	—	0–3	2–2	4–0	0–0	0–1	1–1	2–1	2–2	1–1
Petro de Luanda	2–0	3–0	3–0 (Note: Petro de Luanda was awarded a 3–0 win)	3–0	3–1	4–0	4–1	—	1–1	1–1	2–1	3–1	3–1	4–0	2–0	0–0
Primeiro de Agosto	1–0	0–1	0–1	3–1	2–1	2–0	2–1	2–2	—	5–0	1–1	0–1	3–1	10–0	0–0	3–1
Progresso do Sambizanga	1–1	0–0	1–2	2–1	1–1	0–3	1–1	0–4	1–2	—	0–1	1–2	0–1	2–2	0–1	3–2
Recreativo da Caála	1–0	0–1	4–0	2–1	0–0	1–1	1–0	0–1	1–0	3–0 (Note: Recreativo da Caála was awarded a 3–0 win)	—	0–1	0–0	3–0	2–0	0–0
Recreativo do Libolo	0–2	1–1	3–0	1–1	1–1	0–1	1–2	0–2	0–1	1–1	1–1	—	0–2	1–1	0–0	2–0
Sagrada Esperança	1–0	3–1	2–0	2–0	0–1	1–2	2–1	2–1	0–0	2–0	1–1	2–0	—	6–0	6–0	1–0
Sporting de Benguela	1–1	0–3	1–1	1–4	0–0	0–2	1–2	0–3	0–5	0–1	0–3	1–2	1–4	—	3–1	0–4
Sporting de Cabinda	1–1	1–0	0–0	0–0	1–1	1–1	1–0	0–3	0–1	0–3	2–1	1–0	1–2	3–0 (Note: Sporting de Cabinda was awarded a 3–0 win)	—	0–1
Wiliete SC	2–2	0–2	3–3	0–2	1–1	1–1	2–3	0–3	0–1	3–1	1–1	2–2	1–1	4–0	1–0	—

Updated to match(es) played on 2 October 2021. Source: girabola.com
Legend: Blue = home team win; Yellow = draw; Red = away team win.

== Season statistics ==
=== Scorers ===
R/T
R/T	ACA	BMQ	CCU	DHL	DLS	INT	KAB	PET	PRI	PRO	RCA	RLB	SAG	SBE	SCC	WIL	TOTAL
1	2/10/21	1/10/21	2/10/21	3/10/21	2/10/21	2/10/21	1/10/21	2/10/21	2/10/21	3/10/21	2/10/21	2/10/21	2/10/21	2/10/21	1/10/21	1/10/21	13
1		BMQ–WIL 1–1; Gildo 46'				RLB–INT 0–1; Mano Calesso 50'	KAB–SCC 2–2; Caporal 1'; Calebi 50'	CCU–PET 0–2; Job 36'; Érico 67'	PRI–ACA 1–0; Bito 56'		RCA–SBE 3–0; Joca 3'; Malamba 30'; Deco 78'				KAB–SCC 2–2; Kadima 12'; Tchingane 86'	BMQ–WIL 1–1; Isner 66'	13
2	9/10/21	9/10/21	9/10/21	9/10/21	9/10/21	9/10/21	3/11/21	3/11/21	3/11/21	9/10/21	3/11/21	10/10/21	3/11/21	3/11/21	9/10/21	10/10/21	18
2	ACA–DLS 1–1; César 45+3'				ACA–DLS 1–1; Gláucio 80'	INT–CCU 1–0; Mano 90+3'	SAG–KAB 2–1; Mabelé 14'	PET–RCA 2–1; Yano 65'; Megue 85'	SBE–PRI 0–5; Bobo 16' 90+4'; Bonifácio 25' 32'; Bito 46'		PET–RCA 2–1; Vitinho 87'	WIL–RLB 2–2; Jiresse 36' 74'	SAG–KAB 2–1; Depú 38'; Jó Paciência 61'			WIL–RLB 2–2; João Vala 12'; Isner 70' pen.	18
3	17/10/21	16/10/21	16/10/21	19/10/21	17/10/21	11/1/22	17/10/21	20/10/21	20/10/21	17/10/21	11/1/22	16/10/21	19/10/21	17/10/21	16/10/21	17/10/21	20
3	KAB–ACA 1–2; Cabibi 21'; Cláudio 37'			DHL–SAG 1–2; Ndombele 62'	DLS–SBE 1–0; Maguaia 82'	RCA–INT 1–1; Julinho 18'	KAB–ACA 1–2; Caporal '	PRI–PET 2–2; Quinito 45+3'; Érico 48'	PRI–PET 2–2; Bito 25'; Bonifácio 81'	WIL–PRO 3–1; Kibeixa 62'	RCA–INT 1–1; Zico 48' pen.	RLB–CCU 3–0; Gogoró 3'; Jiresse 32'; Filipe 82'	DHL–SAG 1–2; Lépua 1'; Depú 47'			WIL–PRO 3–1; Isner 24'; Ning 75' 84'	20
4	23/10/21	27/10/21	24/10/21	23/10/21	27/10/21	27/10/21	24/10/21	27/10/21	27/10/21	23/10/21	24/10/21	23/10/21	27/10/21	24/10/21	23/10/21	23/10/21	19
4		SAG–BMQ 3–1; Da Banda 40'	CCU–RCA 1–0; Mussa 4'		PET–DLS 3–1; Gláucio 7'	INT–PRI 1–2; Danilson 74'	SBE–KAB 1–2; Fabrício 57'; Caporal 90+3'	PET–DLS 3–1; Megue 1'; Jaredi 5'; Yano 67'	INT–PRI 1–2; Zini 63'; Benarfa 83'	PRO–RLB 1–2; Vadinho 28'		PRO–RLB 1–2; Jiresse 47'; Chiló 79'	SAG–BMQ 3–1; Depú 45+2' 48'; Victoriano 72'	SBE–KAB 1–2; Kabilá 50'		SCC–WIL 0–1; Messinho 90+3'	19
5	30/10/21	30/10/21	31/10/21	31/10/21	31/10/21	31/10/21	30/10/21	30/10/21	31/10/21	30/10/21	30/10/21	30/10/21	31/10/21	31/10/21	30/10/21	31/10/21	15
5		BMQ–ACA 2–0; Mira 20'; Buá 50'	PRI–CCU 0–1; Mussa 66'	DHL–SBE 1–1; Rupson 11'		DLS–INT 0–2; Mano Mano 70'; Jorginho 88'		KAB–PET 0–3; Yano 45'; Érico 55'; Azulão 79'			RLB–RCA 1–1; Joca 45+2'	RLB–RCA 1–1; Estória 1' o.g.	WIL–SAG 1–1; Depú 74'	DHL–SBE 1–1; Kabilá 80'	PRO–SCC 0–1; Kadima 23'	WIL–SAG 1–1; Zeca 1'	15
6	6/11/21	7/11/21	6/11/21	7/11/21	6/11/21	6/11/21	6/11/21	7/11/21	7/11/21	24/11/22	7/11/21	21/1/22	24/11/22	7/11/21	21/1/22	6/11/21	15
6		SBE–BMQ 0–3; Da Banda 21' 84'; Dungula 62' o.g.				INT–KAB 2–1; Julinho 31'; Mano Calesso 43'	INT–KAB 2–1; Dieu 63'	PET–DHL 3–0; Gleison 30' 37'; Yano 45+1'			RCA–PRI 1–0; Vitinho 35'		SAG–PRO 2–0; Cachi 18'; Depú 74'		SCC–RLB 1–0; Gláucio 65' pen.	ACA–WIL 0–2; Francis 50'; Coxe 87'	15
7	14/11/21	1/12/21	13/11/21	14/11/21	14/11/21	14/11/21	13/11/21	1/12/21	1/12/21	14/11/21	14/11/21	1/12/21	1/12/21	15/11/21	1/12/21	15/11/21	19
7	PRO–ACA 1–1; Vladimir 45+1'	BMQ–PET 2–3; Da Banda 35'; Wiwí 51'		DHL–INT 1–0; Milton 72'	DLS–RCA 1–0; Maguaia 19'		KAB–CCU 2–0; Caporal 54' pen. Dieu 90+1'	BMQ–PET 2–3; Azulão 40' pen. 58'; Quinito 90+5'	RLB–PRI 0–1; Luvumbu 46'	PRO–ACA 1–1; Vanilson 48'			SCC–SAG 1–2; Depú 25'; Victoriano 56'		SCC–SAG 1–2; Kadima 88' pen.	WIL–SBE 4–0; Ning 34' 49'; Geovani 51'; Bugos 90'	19
8	20/11/21	20/11/21	22/11/21	22/11/21	21/11/21	20/11/21	21/11/21	21/11/21	21/11/21	21/11/21	21/11/21	20/11/21	20/11/21	21/11/21	20/11/21	21/11/21	11
8				CCU–DHL 0–2; Duarte 45'; Malamba 55'	PRI–DLS 2–1; Yuri 71'	INT–BMQ 2–0; Paty 42'; Eliseu 45'			PRI–DLS 2–1; Dago 7'; Herenilson 80'	SBE–PRO 0–1; Vanilson 68'	RCA–KAB 1–0; Vitinho 22'		SAG–RLB 2–0; Depú 47' 65'				11
9	27/11/22	27/11/22	27/11/22	28/11/22	27/11/22	14/1/22	27/11/22	28/11/22	27/11/22	28/11/22	28/11/22	27/11/22	27/11/22	9/12/21	9/12/21	14/1/22	14
9					RLB–DLS 1–1; Gláucio 89'	WIL–INT 1–1; Mano Calesso 20'	KAB–PRI 2–2; Richy 59' 69'	PRO–PET 0–4; Quinito 8'; Soares 12'; Pedro Pinto 43'; Maya 78'	KAB–PRI 2–2; Zini 15'; Luvumbu 21'		DHL–RCA 0–1; Malamba 24'	RLB–DLS 1–1; Liliano 90+8'	SAG–ACA 1–0; Depú 23' pen.			WIL–INT 1–1; Zeca 90+3' pen.	14
10	4/12/21	5/12/21	5/12/21	5/12/21	5/12/21	8/12/21	5/12/21	6/12/21	5/12/21	8/12/21	5/12/21	4/12/21	5/12/21	5/12/21	6/12/21	5/12/21	20
10	ACA–RLB 1–2; Edú 4'	RCA–BMQ 0–1; Da Banda 14'		PRI–DHL 3–1; Andeloy 60'		INT–PRO 4–0; Julinho 29' 36' 90+5'; Paty 66'		PET–SCC 2–0; Azulão 55' pen. 78'	PRI–DHL 3–1; Zini 12'; Luvumbu 24' pen. Dago 52'			ACA–RLB 1–2; Jiresse 11'; Liliano 69'	SBE–SAG 1–4; Depú 35' 45+3' pen. Cachi 37'; Jefer Gunjo 90+4'	SBE–SAG 1–4; Cebola 45+2' pen.		CCU–WIL 0–1; Zeca 31'	20
11	12/12/21	12/12/21	11/12/21	11/12/21	11/12/21	12/12/21	11/12/21	11/12/21	12/12/21	11/12/21	12/12/21	11/12/21	11/12/21	12/12/21	12/12/21	12/12/21	21
11	ACA–SBE 2–1; Ady Boyó 86'; Valdez 90+1'	BMQ–PRI 1–2; Wiwí 90+3'	PRO–CCU 1–2; Ndieu 4'; Mussa 44'	DHL–DLS 1–1; Freddy 5'	DHL–DLS 1–1; Gláucio 40'	SCC–INT 1–1; Catraio 62'	RLB–KAB 1–2; Cuxixima 4' 75'	SAG–PET 2–1; Yano 50'	BMQ–PRI 1–2; Dago 26'; Vingumba 90'	PRO–CCU 1–2; Bebo 85'	WIL–RCA 1–1; Zico 54'	RLB–KAB 1–2; Liliano 55'	SAG–PET 2–1; Depú 46' 84'	ACA–SBE 2–1; Kabilá 36' pen.	SCC–INT 1–1; Kadima 18' pen.	WIL–RCA 1–1; Venâncio 56' pen.	21
12	15/12/21	15/12/21	15/12/21	15/1/22	15/12/21	15/12/21	15/1/22	15/12/21	16/12/21	15/12/21	15/12/21	15/12/21	15/12/21	15/12/21	15/12/21	16/12/21	16
12		DLS–BMQ 0–1; Amaro 12'		KAB–DHL 1–1; Rupson 10'		INT–SAG 1–2; Catraio 31'	KAB–DHL 1–1; Cuxixima 57'	PET–ACA 2–0; Gleison 63'; Azulão 67'	PRI–WIL 3–1; Macaia 6'; Bobo 30'; Zini 64'			SBE–RLB 1–2; Gogoró 7'; Jiresse 21'	INT–SAG 1–2; Depú 37'; Luís Tati 90+6'	SBE–RLB 1–2; Ngoma 78'	CCU–SCC 0–1; Kadima 90'	PRI–WIL 3–1; Ning 80'	16
13	19/12/21	18/1/22	18/12/21	18/12/21	19/12/21	19/12/21	18/1/22	20/12/21	19/12/21	19/12/21	18/12/21	18/12/21	18/12/21	20/12/21	18/12/21	19/12/21	18
13	ACA–INT 1–1; Dilson 67'	BMQ–KAB 2–0; Samson 6'; Wiwí 47'		RLB–DHL 1–1; Rupson 20'	WIL–DLS 1–1; Maguaia 90+2'	ACA–INT 1–1; Mano Calesso 24'		SBE–PET 0–3; Azulão 35'; Érico 45'; Yano 75'	PRO–PRI 1–2; Luvumbu 3'; Mário 88'	PRO–PRI 1–2; Kibeixa 24'	RCA–SCC 2–0; Gedeon 13'; Zico 56'	RLB–DHL 1–1; Liliano 38'	SAG–CCU 2–0; Betinho 89' o.g. Luís Tati 90'			WIL–DLS 1–1; Ning 52'	18
14	23/12/21	23/12/21	23/12/21	23/12/21	13/1/22	17/1/22	23/12/21	24/11/21	22/12/21	13/1/22	23/12/21	24/11/21	23/12/21	17/1/22	22/12/21	23/12/21	11
14			CCU–ACA 1–0; Mussa 74'		DLS–PRO 2–0; João Rafael 5'; Yuri 65'	SBE–INT 0–2; Jorginho 70'; Buba 86'	KAB–WIL 1–1; Richy 45'	PET–RLB 3–1; Azulão 11' 45'; Quinito 21'				PET–RLB 3–1; Jiresse 34'				KAB–WIL 1–1; Venâncio 74'	11
15	8/1/22	15/1/22	8/1/22	9/1/22	9/1/22	8/1/22	8/1/22	8/1/22	15/1/22	8/1/22	8/1/22	15/1/22	15/1/22	8/1/22	9/1/22	9/1/22	16
15	ACA–RCA 1–0; Ady Boyó 73'		SBE–CCU 1–1; Micro 63'	WIL–DHL 0–2; Milton 4'; Nandinho 63'	SCC–DLS 1–1; Maguaia 7'		PRO–KAB 1–1; Edmilson 17'	PET–INT 4–0; Azulão 65' 78'; Pedro Pinto 84'; Érico 87'		PRO–KAB 1–1; Kibeixa 65' pen.		BMQ–RLB 0–3; Baby 7' 76'; Lukeba 90'		SBE–CCU 1–1; Selimani 36'	SCC–DLS 1–1; Gláucio 30'		16
16	22/1/22	23/1/22	22/1/22	23/1/22	22/1/22	28/2/22	26/2/22	22/1/22	22/1/22	23/1/22	22/1/22	28/2/22	22/1/22	22/1/22	26/2/22	23/1/22	13
16		WIL–BMQ 0–2; Da Banda 53'; Ayson 90+3'		PRO–DHL 2–1; Rupson 52'	SAG–DLS 0–1; Jaime 51'	INT–RLB 1–1; Julinho 27'			ACA–PRI 0–1; Benarfa 38'	PRO–DHL 2–1; Vanilson 79'; Isaac 86'	SBE–RCA 0–3; Deco 3'; Malamba 53'; Zico 65'	INT–RLB 1–1; Gegé 45'			SCC–KAB 1–0; Barreiro 41'		13
17	29/1/22	27/2/22	30/1/22	29/1/22	29/1/22	30/1/22	30/1/22	30/1/22	30/1/22	27/2/22	30/1/22	29/1/22	30/1/22	30/1/22	29/1/22	29/1/22	22
17	DLS–ACA 1–1; Dilson 77'	BMQ–PRO 2–1; Savané 38'; Mira 86'	CCU–INT 1–0; Paulito 18'	DHL–SCC 1–0; Mendes 5'	DLS–ACA 1–1; Liliano 59'		KAB–SAG 1–1; Dieu 26'	RCA–PET 0–1; Yano 81'	PRI–SBE 10–0; Cristiano 14' o.g. Zini 18' 50'; Manico 28' 79' 82'; Benarfa 40'; Bito 41'; Cirilo 66' 81'	BMQ–PRO 2–1; Jorge Pedro 46'		RLB–WIL 2–0; Emmanuel 14'; Gilberto 50'	KAB–SAG 1–1; Jó Paciência 13'				22
18	5/2/22	5/2/22	6/2/22	5/2/22	5/2/22	5/2/22	5/2/22	5/2/22	5/2/22	5/2/22	5/2/22	6/2/22	5/2/22	5/2/22	5/2/22	5/2/22	14
18	ACA–KAB 2–0; Cláudio 15' pen. Cabibi 32' pen.		CCU–RLB 1–0; Apado 44'			INT–RCA 1–0; Buba 70'		PET–PRI 1–1; Soares 41'	PET–PRI 1–1; Jiresse 62'	PRO–WIL 3–2; Vanilson 32'; Kibeixa 58' 85' pen.			SAG–DHL 2–0; Gaspar 90'; Depú 90+5'		SCC–BMQ 1–0; Paizinho 23'	PRO–WIL 3–2; Silva 79'; Messinho 90+2'	14
19	13/2/22	6/4/22	13/2/22	13/2/22	30/4/22	13/2/22	23/3/22	30/4/22	13/2/22	12/2/22	13/2/22	12/2/22	6/4/22	23/3/22	13/2/22	13/2/22	20
19	DHL–ACA 2–1; Dilson 87'	BMQ–SAG 1–0; Sidnei ' pen.		DHL–ACA 2–1; Tchutchu 35'; Freddy 60'	DLS–PET 1–3; Jaime 12'		KAB–SBE 2–1; Gaca 29'; Fabrício 44'	DLS–PET 1–3; Mindinho 24'; Eddie Afonso 32'; Jaredi 43'	PRI–INT 2–0; Macaia 84'; Jó Vidal 90+2'	RLB–PRO 1–1; Vanilson 3'	RCA–CCU 4–0; Deco 9' 26' 76'; Malamba 45+1'	RLB–PRO 1–1; Gogoró 31'		KAB–SBE 2–1; Quinho 46'		WIL–SCC 1–0; Juze 63'	20
20	19/2/22	19/2/22	20/2/22	19/2/22	19/2/22	19/2/22	25/1/22	25/1/22	20/2/22	19/2/22	20/2/22	20/2/22	13/4/22	19/2/22	19/2/22	13/4/22	23
20	ACA–BMQ 3–2; Cabibi 45+1' 70'; Dilson 65'	ACA–BMQ 3–2; Rúben 67'; Gazeta 90+3'		SBE–DHL 1–4; Mingo Bile 1' 90+2'; Sargento 29'; Freddy 48' pen.	INT–DLS 2–1; Betinho 25'	INT–DLS 2–1; Julinho 67'; Paty 87'	PET–KAB 4–1; Cuxixima 27'	PET–KAB 4–1; Azulão 7' 50'; Buchinho 32' o.g. Érico 62'		SCC–PRO 0–3; Dadão Bile 56'; Vanilson 59'; Dax 80'		RCA–RLB 0–1; Gilberto 18'	SAG–WIL 1–0; Jefer Gunjo 24'	SBE–DHL 1–4; Cristiano 18' pen.			23
21	6/3/22	5/3/22	5/3/22	6/3/22	5/3/22	6/3/22	6/3/22	6/3/22	6/3/22	5/3/22	6/3/22	5/3/22	5/3/22	5/3/22	5/3/22	6/3/22	16
21	WIL–ACA 2–2; Cabibi 45+3' pen. Nelito 82'	BMQ–SBE 2–0; Samson 66'; Gildo 76'	DLS–CCU 0–1; Tchube 75'	DHL–PET 1–4; Rupson 3'		KAB–INT 0–1; Jamanta 40'		DHL–PET 1–4; Azulão 7'; Soares 24'; Dino 38' o.g. Vidinho 86'	PRI–RCA 1–1; Macaia 7'		PRI–RCA 1–1; Stélvio 88'		PRO–SAG 0–1; Victoriano 23'			WIL–ACA 2–2; Geovani 61'; Sukuia 89' pen.	16
22	12/3/22	27/4/22	13/3/22	12/3/22	13/3/22	12/3/22	13/3/22	27/4/22	13/3/22	12/3/22	13/3/22	13/3/22	1/2/22	22/3/22	1/2/22	22/3/22	22
22	ACA–PRO 5–0; Nelito Tavares 6'; Cabibi 8'; Dilson 29'; Valente 73'; Nelito Cachimili 85'			INT–DHL 1–2; Nandinho 31'; Milton 51'		INT–DHL 1–2; Jorginho 53'		PET–BMQ 3–0; Pedro Pinto 4'; Érico 46'; Maya 54'				PRI–RLB 0–1; Emmanuel 84'	SAG–SCC 6–0; Depú 29' 46' pen. 62'; Dlamini 69'; Jó Paciência 80' 85'			SBE–WIL 0–4; Sukuya 36'; Lukeba 43'; Francis 50'; Mengolo 58'	22
23	19/3/22	19/3/22	20/3/22	20/3/22	13/4/22	19/3/22	19/3/22	2/3/22	13/4/22	20/3/22	19/3/22	16/3/22	16/3/22	20/3/22	19/3/22	2/3/22	16
23	SCC–ACA 1–1; Dilson 26'			DHL–CCU 2–0; Tchutchu 2'; Nandinho 11'	DLS–PRI 1–2; Liliano 19'			WIL–PET 0–3; Gleison 14'; Yano 27'; Azulão 90+2'	DLS–PRI 1–2; Bobo 52'; Zini 71'	PRO–SBE 2–2; Kibeixa 71' pen. Jorge Pedro 90+4'			RLB–SAG 0–2; Luís Tati 41'; Celso 66'	PRO–SBE 2–2; Cebola 49'; Kabilá 52'	SCC–ACA 1–1; Barreiro 58'		16
24	2/3/22	20/4/22	20/4/22	1/5/22	27/4/22	1/5/22	1/5/22	6/4/22	1/5/22	6/4/22	1/5/22	27/4/22	2/3/22	20/4/22	20/4/22	1/5/22	18
24	ACA–SAG 2–0; Nelito Tavares 43'; Caprego 60'	CCU–BMQ 1–1; Da Banda 22'	CCU–BMQ 1–1; Mussá 74'	RCA–DHL 2–1; Nandinho 65'		INT–WIL 1–1; Julinho 90+3'	PRI–KAB 2–1; Richy 50'	PET–PRO 1–1; Yano 73'	PRI–KAB 2–1; Melono 6'; Bito 71'	PET–PRO 1–1; Isaac Pinto 30'	RCA–DHL 2–1; Deco 6'; Malamba 54'			SBE–SCC 3–1; Quinho 3'; Cebola 56'; Cristiano 64' pen.	SBE–SCC 3–1; Barreiro 68' pen.	INT–WIL 1–1; Ning 23'	18
25	9/4/22	9/4/22	8/4/22	10/4/22	10/4/22	9/4/22	10/4/22	9/4/22	10/4/22	9/4/22	9/4/22	9/4/22	9/4/22	9/4/22	9/4/22	8/4/22	27
25	RLB–ACA 0–2; Dilson 65'; Cabibi 72' pen.	BMQ–RCA 2–1; Estevão 76'; Chole 86'	WIL–CCU 3–3; Yayá 21'; Magrinho 37'; Samuel 77'	DHL–PRI 2–1; Nandinho 29'; Cagodó 44'	KAB–DLS 0–1; Liliano 3'	PRO–INT 0–3; Julinho 6' 52'; Paty 48'		SCC–PET 0–3; Azulão 35'; Yano 40'; Jaredi 65'	DHL–PRI 2–1; Benarfa 54'		BMQ–RCA 2–1; Jepson 90'		SAG–SBE 6–0; Jefer Gunjo 3'; Jó Paciência 49' 68'; Carlinhos 56'; Lépua 62'; Cachi 77'			WIL–CCU 3–3; Silva Anato 84'; Dazy 89'; Maludi 90' o.g.	27
26	16/4/22	17/4/22	17/4/22	17/4/22	17/4/22	16/4/22	16/4/22	18/5/22	17/4/22	17/4/22	17/4/22	16/4/22	18/5/22	16/4/22	16/4/22	17/4/22	17
26	SBE–ACA 1–1; Cabibi 70'	PRI–BMQ 0–1; Buá 27'	CCU–PRO 2–1; Paulito 8'; Mussa 60'	DLS–DHL 2–1; Tchutchu 79'	DLS–DHL 2–1; Maguaia 17' 54'	INT–SCC 2–1; Julinho 2'; Balsa 54'		PET–SAG 3–1; Quinito 34'; Azulão 58'; Ito 76'		CCU–PRO 2–1; Mateus Afonso 37'		KAB–RLB 0–1; Emmanuel 38'	PET–SAG 3–1; Jó Paciência 90' pen.	SBE–ACA 1–1; Cebola 2'	INT–SCC 2–1; Barreiro 34'		17
27	9/5/22	24/4/22	24/4/22	22/4/22	24/4/22	23/4/22	22/4/22	9/5/22	24/4/22	23/4/22	23/4/22	23/4/22	23/4/22	23/4/22	24/4/22	24/4/22	14
27	ACA–PET 1–1; Valdez 19'	BMQ–DLS 2–1; Savané 55' pen. 81'		DHL–KAB 1–1; Rupson 57'	BMQ–DLS 2–1; Cuca 52'	SAG–INT 1–2; Kaya 9'; Julinho 28'	DHL–KAB 1–1; Richy 45+1'	ACA–PET 1–1; Érico 21'	WIL–PRI 0–1; Dagó 47'		PRO–RCA 0–1; Tchitchi 49'	RLB–SBE 1–1; Abdul 25'	SAG–INT 1–2; Luís Tati 41'	RLB–SBE 1–1; Cristiano 55' pen.			14
28	14/5/22	7/5/22	8/5/22	8/5/22	7/5/22	14/5/22	7/5/22	20/5/22	8/5/22	8/5/22	7/5/22	8/5/22	8/5/22	20/5/22	7/5/22	7/5/22	28
28	INT–ACA 2–3; Dilson 16' 24' 70'	KAB–BMQ 2–2; Amaro 2'; Savané 57' pen.		DHL–RLB 2–0; Rupson 13'; Mingo Bile 37' pen.	DLS–WIL 2–2; Maguaia 42'; Sténio 79'	INT–ACA 2–3; Julinho 3'; Buba 14'	KAB–BMQ 2–2; Fabrício 26'; Richy 40' pen.	PET–SBE 4–0; Azulão 3' 8' 64'; Érico 13'	PRI–PRO 5–0; Melono 15' 48' 51'; Zini 74'; Benarfa 83'		SCC–RCA 2–1; Chabalala 22'		CCU–SAG 0–1; Manguxi 76'		SCC–RCA 2–1; Baúca 15'; Paizinho 84'	DLS–WIL 2–2; Bebucho 6'; Dazy 53'	28
29	23/5/22	23/5/22	23/5/22	23/5/22	23/5/22	23/5/22	23/5/22	23/5/22	23/5/22	23/5/22	23/5/22	23/5/22	23/5/22	23/5/22	23/5/22	23/5/22	26
29	ACA–CCU 2–2; Dilson 15' 60'	BMQ–DHL 3–3; Da Banda 20' 37'; Buá 84'	ACA–CCU 2–2; Apado 27'; Mussa 87'	BMQ–DHL 3–3; Rupson 2' 34'; Freddy 90+6'	PRO–DLS 1–1; João Rafael 73'	INT–SBE 4–0; Julinho 6' 85'; Jorginho 27'; Mano Mano 90+4'	WIL–KAB 2–3; Richy 6' 46' 76'	RLB–PET 0–2; Maya 23'; Job 76'	SCC–PRI 0–1; Hossi 36'	PRO–DLS 1–1; Fred 14'	SAG–RCA 1–1; Deco 39'		SAG–RCA 1–1; Jó Paciência 89' pen.			WIL–KAB 2–3; Venâncio 21'; Lukeba 69'	26
30	29/5/22	28/5/22	29/5/22	29/5/22	29/5/22	28/5/22	28/5/22	28/5/22	28/5/22	28/5/22	29/5/22	28/5/22	28/5/22	29/5/22	29/5/22	29/5/22	24
30		RLB–BMQ 1–1; Buá 52'	CCU–SBE 5–0; Apado 1' 62' 64'; Micro 47'	DHL–WIL 3–1; Mendes 21'; Malamba 77'; Freddy 90+5'	DLS–SCC 1–1; Liliano 40'	INT–PET 1–1; Jorginho 33' pen.	KAB–PRO 4–0; Buchinho 13'; Cuxixima 57' 72' 80'	INT–PET 1–1; Azulão 90+2' pen.	PRI–SAG 3–1; Melono 22'; Benarfa 62'; Dagó 81'		RCA–ACA 1–0; Deco 84'	RLB–BMQ 1–1; Gogoró 81' pen.	PRI–SAG 3–1; Victoriano 26'		DLS–SCC 1–1; Dieu 71'	DHL–WIL 3–1; Mona Rafael 11'	24
T	35	35	22	37	24	41	31	71	52	22	27	28	49	15	16	38	546

=== Top scorers ===
As of 2 October 2021

=== Hat-tricks ===
As of 2 October 2021

== Stadiums ==
Team	Location	Stadium	Capacity
Atlético Petróleos de Luanda	Talatona	Estádio 11 de Novembro	48,500
C.D. Primeiro de Agosto	Luanda	Estádio França Ndalu	20,000
G.D. Sagrada Esperança	Dundo	Estádio Sagrada Esperança	8,000
G.D. Interclube	Luanda	Estádio 22 de Junho	8,000
F.C. Bravos do Maquis	Luena	Estádio Mundunduleno	4,300
C.D. Huíla	Lubango	Estádio do Ferroviário da Huíla	30,000
C.R. Caála	Caála	Estádio Mártires da Canhala	11,000
Académica Petróleos do Lobito	Lobito	Estádio do Buraco	5,000
C.R.D. Libolo	Calulo	Estádio Municipal de Calulo	5,000
Cuando Cubango FC	Cuíto	Estádio dos Eucaliptos (Angola)	4,000
Wiliete S.C.	Benguela	Estádio Nacional de Ombaka	35,000
Sporting Clube de Cabinda	Tafe	Estádio Municipal do Tafe	5,000
C.D. Lunda Sul	Saurimo	Estádio das Mangueiras	7,000
Kabuscorp S.C.P.	Luanda	Estádio dos Coqueiros	12,000
Progresso Associação do Sambizanga	Luanda	Estádio da Cidadela	60,000
Sporting Clube de Benguela	Benguela	Estádio do Arregaça	2,000
