= Mateus Santos =

Brazilian footballer

Personal information
- Full name: Mateus Barbosa Santos Criciúma
- Date of birth: 19 January 1999 (age 27)
- Place of birth: Manga, Brazil
- Height: 1.76 m (5 ft 9 in)
- Position: Winger

Team information
- Current team: Anagennisi Karditsa
- Number: 79

Youth career
- –2019: Paulista
- 2017–2018: → Porto (loan)
- 2018: → Grêmio (loan)
- 2019–2020: Atlético Mineiro

Senior career*
Years	Team	Apps	(Gls)
2017–2019	Paulista	4	(0)
2019–2020	Atlético Mineiro	0	(0)
2020	→ Vila Nova (loan)	3	(0)
2020–2021	Ituano	19	(2)
2021	São Bento	8	(0)
2021–2022	Botoșani	38	(2)
2023–2024	Farul Constanța	16	(3)
2023–2024	→ A.E. Kifisia (loan)	30	(2)
2024–2025	RS Berkane	15	(1)
2025–2026	Portimonense	4	(0)
2026	Cuiabá	15	(1)
2026–	Anagennisi Karditsa	0	(0)
- * Club domestic league appearances and goals as of 14 June 2026

Mateus Barbosa Santos Criciúma (born 19 January 1999) is a Brazilian professional footballer who plays as a winger for Super League Greece 2 club Anagennisi Karditsa.

== Career ==
Santos started his football career as a junior at the academies of Paulista, Porto, Grêmio and Atlético Mineiro. He recorded his senior debut with the former club on 8 February 2017, in a 1–0 home defeat of Atibaia in the Campeonato Paulista Série A3.

On 23 July 2021, Santos joined Botoșani of Romania on a two-year contract. He made his debut on 6 August that year, in a 2–1 Liga I victory over UTA Arad.

On 9 September 2025, Santos signed a two-season contract with Portimonense in Portugal. After making just four appearances for the Portimão-based side, in January 2026, he returned to Brazil, joining Campeonato Brasileiro Série B club Cuiabá.

On 2 September 2026, Santos signed for Super League Greece 2 club Anagennisi Karditsa on a free transfer.

== Honours ==
Farul Constanța

- Liga I: 2022–23
- Supercupa României runner-up: 2023

RS Berkane

- Botola Pro: 2024–25
- Moroccan Throne Cup runner-up: 2024–25
- CAF Confederation Cup: 2024–25
