= Valentin Nouma =

Burkinabé footballer

Personal information
- Date of birth: 14 February 2000 (age 26)
- Position: Defender

Team information
- Current team: Simba Sports Club

Senior career*
Years	Team	Apps	(Gls)
2017–2024	Rahimo FC		

International career^{‡}
2018–	Burkina Faso	2	(0)
- * Club domestic league appearances and goals as of 11:44, 23 September 2018 (UTC) ‡ National team caps and goals as of 11:44, 23 September 2018 (UTC)

Valentin Nouma (born 14 February 2000) is a Burkinabé footballer who currently plays as a defender for Simba Sports Club and the Burkina Faso national team.

== Career statistics ==
=== International ===
As of matches played 23 September 2018.

National team	Year	Apps	Goals
Burkina Faso	2018	2	0
Total		2	0
