= Awesu Ally Awesu =

Zanzibari footballer (born 1997)

Awesu Ali
Personal information
- Date of birth: 10 April 1997 (age 29)
- Place of birth: Zanzibar
- Height: 1.66 m (5 ft 5 in)
- Position: Midfielder

Senior career*
Years	Team	Apps	(Gls)
–2015	Azam		
2015–2018	Mwadui		
2018–2019	Singida United		
2019–2020	Kagera Sugar		
2020–2021	Azam		
2021–2024	KMC		
2024–2025	Simba		
2026–	Kenya Police		

International career^{‡}
2019	Zanzibar	2	(0)
- * Club domestic league appearances and goals ‡ National team caps and goals as of 8 December 2019

Awesu Ally Awesu (born 10 April 1997) is a Zanzibari professional footballer who plays as a midfielder for Kenya Police.

== Early life ==
Awesu was born on 10 April 1997 in Zanzibar. Growing up, he attended Mwembe Makumbi Primary School in Zanzibar.

== Club career ==
Awesu started his career with Tanzanian side Azam. Ahead of the 2021–22 season, he signed for Tanzanian side KMC. Three years later, he signed for Tanzanian side Simba. Following his stint there, he signed for Kenyan side Kenya Police in 2026.

== International career ==
Awesu is a Zanzibar international. During the winter of 2019, he played for the Zanzibar national football team at the 2019 CECAFA Cup.

== Style of play ==
Tanzanian newspaper Mwananchi wrote in 2024 that "he is the type of player who gives comfort to the fans when he has money on his feet. He is not impatient, the ball is moving".
