= Fares Khaled =

Egyptian footballer (born 2005)

Abdelrahman Khaled Abdellatif (Arabic: عبدالرحمن خالد; born 11 June 2005), commonly known as Fares Khaled (Arabic: فارس خالد), is an Egyptian professional footballer who plays as an attacking midfielder for Egyptian Premier League club Al Ahly and the Egypt U20.
