= Steven Mukwala =

Ugandan footballer (born 1999)

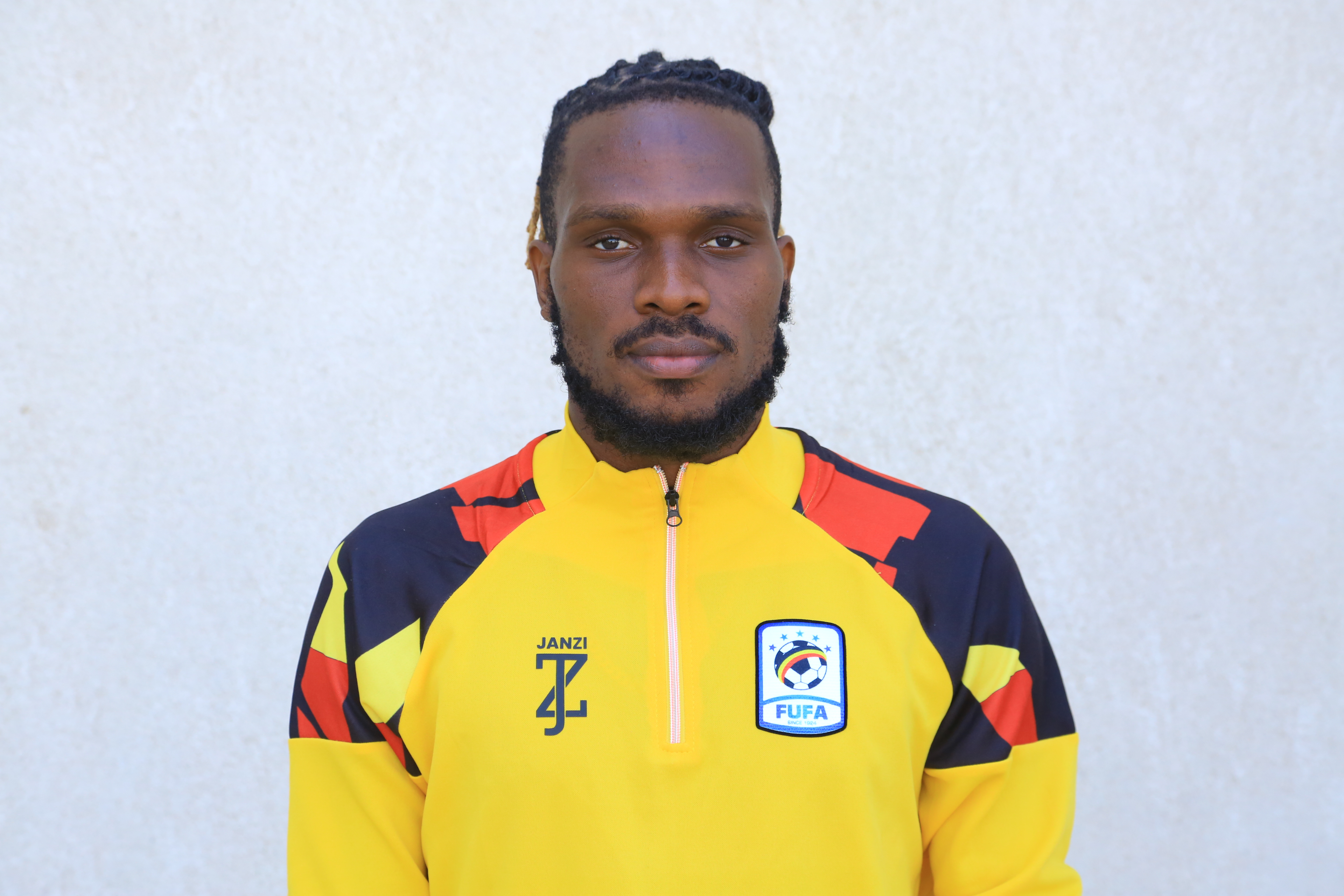
- Steven_Mukwala with Uganda Cranes in Egypt

Personal information
- Full name: Steven Mukwala
- Date of birth: 15 July 1999 (age 27)
- Height: 1.76 m (5 ft 9 in)
- Position: Striker

Youth career
- 2010–2013: Edgars Youth Programme

Senior career*
Years	Team	Apps	(Gls)
2014–2017	Edgars Football Club	37	(53)
2014–2017	Buleemezi	8	(5)
2017	Singo	9	(6)
2018–2019	Vipers	8	(1)
2019–2021	Maroons	43	(17)
2021–2022	Kampala	22	(13)
2022–2023	Asante Kotoko	63	(25)
2024–2026	Simba S.C.	28	(13)

International career^{‡}
2018	Uganda U-23	4	(1)
2019–	Uganda	30	(2)
- * Club domestic league appearances and goals as of 28 July 2025 ‡ National team caps and goals as of 15 July 2026

Steven Mukwala (born 15 July 1999) is a Ugandan professional footballer who currently plays as a striker, he was Asante Kotoko Sc player. He played Vipers SC and loaned at Maroons FC of Uganda Premier League.

== Career ==
=== Club ===
In January 2017, it was announced that Mukwala would be joining a top flight club in Uganda, Vipers SC in what was reported to be an initial great deal, taking him from Masaza football to champions of Ugandan football Vipers.

In 2018, Mukwala was called up for the Uganda U23 National Team to play against Ghana and Cameroon where he scored one goal and was also part of the Uganda Squad that took part in the COSAFA Championships in Lesotho and he managed to help Uganda finish 3rd behind Egypt having scored 3 goals.

In February 2017, Mukwala was part of the Vipers Squad that won the Azam Uganda Premier League and was much in the plans of Miguel Da Costa the coach of the Vipers. By then, he had built his coach's trust in him after scoring crucial goals for the team in the quest for the title of 2017.

In 2019, Mukwala was loaned at Maroons FC for the new season 2019-2020, where he has scored 13 goals and became one of the league's top scorers with five games to go in the Uganda Premier League. His speed and powerful finishing caught the eye of many other clubs, but he gave first priority to his mother Club Vipers SC.

== Career statistics ==
=== International ===
As of match played 30 December 2025

Appearances and goals by national team and year
National team	Year	Apps	Goals
Uganda	2019	1	0
Uganda	2020	–	
Uganda	2021	6	0
Uganda	2022	4	0
Uganda	2023	1	0
Uganda	2024	9	1
Uganda	2025	9	1
Total		30	2

Scores and results list Uganda's goal tally first, score column indicates score after each Mukwala goal.

List of international goals scored by Steven Mukwala
No.	Date	Venue	Opponent	Score	Result	Competition
1	26 March 2024	Marrakesh Stadium, Marrakesh, Morocco	Ghana	1–1	2–2	Friendly
2	14 October 2025	Hocine Aït Ahmed Stadium, Tizi Ouzou, Algeria	Algeria	1–0	1–2	2026 FIFA World Cup qualification
