= C.D. Lunda Sul =

Angolan football club

Lunda Sul
- Full name: Clube Desportivo da Lunda Sul
- Founded: 1990
- Ground: Estádio das Mangueiras; Saurimo, Angola
- Capacity: 7,000
- Chairman: Miguel da Silva Ipwupwu
- Manager: Kidumo Pedro
- League: Girabola
- 2025–26: 8th
Home colours	Away colours

Clube Desportivo da Lunda Sul is an Angolan football club based in Saurimo. They are making their debut in Girabola – the Angolan First Division – in the 2021–22 season, after being promoted from the Gira Angola.

The club plays their home matches at Saurimo's Mangueiras stadium

== Staff ==
Name	Nat	Pos
Technical staff
Maurílio	(Brazil)	Head coach
—	(Angola)	Assistant Coach
—	(Angola)	Goalkeeper Coach
Medical
	(Angola)	Physio
Management
Miguel da Silva	(Angola)	Chairman
	(Angola)	Head of Foot Dept

== Manager history ==
(Portugal) Sérgio Traguil	(2020–21)
(Angola) Kidumo Pedro	(2021–22)

== See also ==
- Girabola
- Gira Angola
