= Kibu Denis =

Tanzanian footballer (born 1998)

Personal information
- Full name: Kibu Denis Prosper
- Date of birth: 4 December 1998 (age 27)
- Place of birth: Mbeya, Tanzania
- Height: 1.75 m (5 ft 9 in)
- Position: Winger

Senior career*
Years	Team	Apps	(Gls)
–2020	Geita Gold		
2020–2021	Mbeya City		
2021–2026	Simba S.C.		

International career^{‡}
2021–	Tanzania	25	(0)
- * Club domestic league appearances and goals ‡ National team caps and goals as of 15:55, 1 August 2025 (UTC)

Kibu Denis Prosper (born 4 December 1998), is a Tanzanian footballer who plays as a winger.

== Career ==
Denis was born in Mbeya. He played for Mbeya City before signing with Simba S.C. in August 2021, on a two-year contract.

Observers have noted of Denis that "the striker who featured for Tanzania against Malawi in a friendly... has been an outstanding player for Mbeya City in the season that is about to end and his performance has generated interest", his performance on the pitched was also recognized during the Geita Gold FC in the 2020–21 Mainland Tanzania Premier League promotion/relegation playoffs fixtures against Mbeya City FC".
