= 2026 CAF Champions League final =

African club football tournament final

- Promotional banner
- Event: 2025–26 CAF Champions League
Mamelodi Sundowns	AS FAR
(South Africa)	(Morocco)
2	1

First leg
Mamelodi Sundowns	AS FAR
1	0
- Date: 17 May 2026
- Venue: Loftus Versfeld Stadium, Pretoria
- Referee: Jean-Jacques Ndala
- Attendance: 51,000
- Weather: Sunny; 18 °C (64 °F); 49% humidity

Second leg
AS FAR	Mamelodi Sundowns
1	1
- Date: 24 May 2026
- Venue: Prince Moulay Abdellah Stadium, Rabat
- Referee: Omar Artan
- Attendance: 60,000
- Weather: Mostly clear 26 °C (79 °F); 56% humidity

The 2026 CAF Champions League final was the two-legged final of the 2025–26 CAF Champions League, the 62nd edition of Africa's premier club football tournament organized by the Confederation of African Football (CAF), and the 30th edition under the current CAF Champions League title contested by Mamelodi Sundowns from South Africa and AS FAR from Morocco.

Mamelodi Sundowns defeated AS FAR 2–1 on aggregate to win their second CAF Champions League title.

== Teams ==
In the following table, finals until 1996 were in the African Cup of Champions Clubs era, since 1997 were in the CAF Champions League era.

Team	Zone	Previous finals appearances (bold indicates winners)
(South Africa) Mamelodi Sundowns	COSAFA (Southern Africa)	3 (2001, **2016**, 2025)
(Morocco) AS FAR	UNAF (North Africa)	1 (**1985**)

== Venues ==
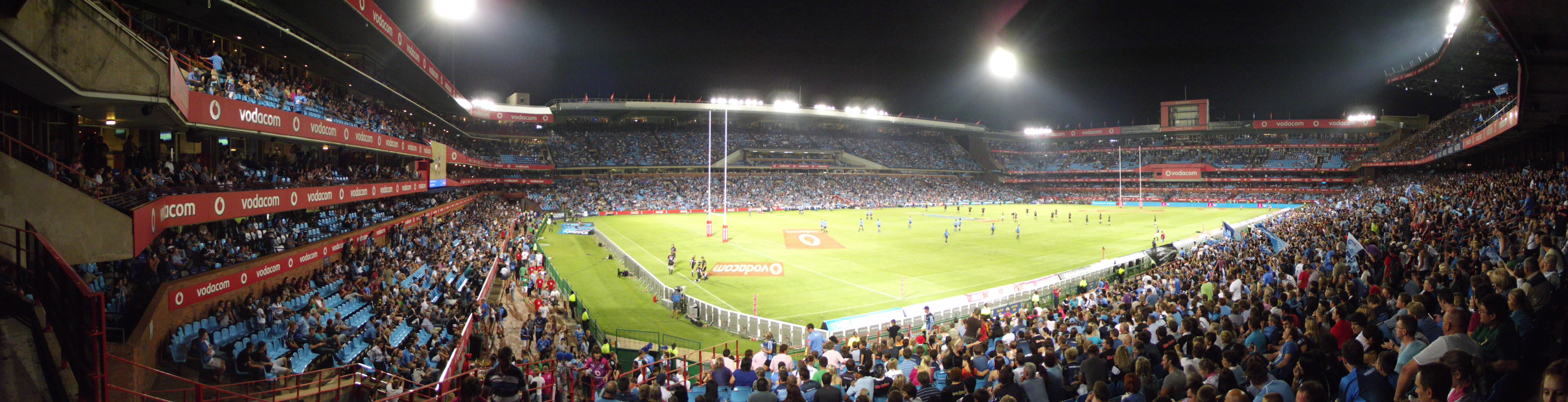
Loftus Versfeld Stadium in Pretoria, South Africa, hosted the first leg.

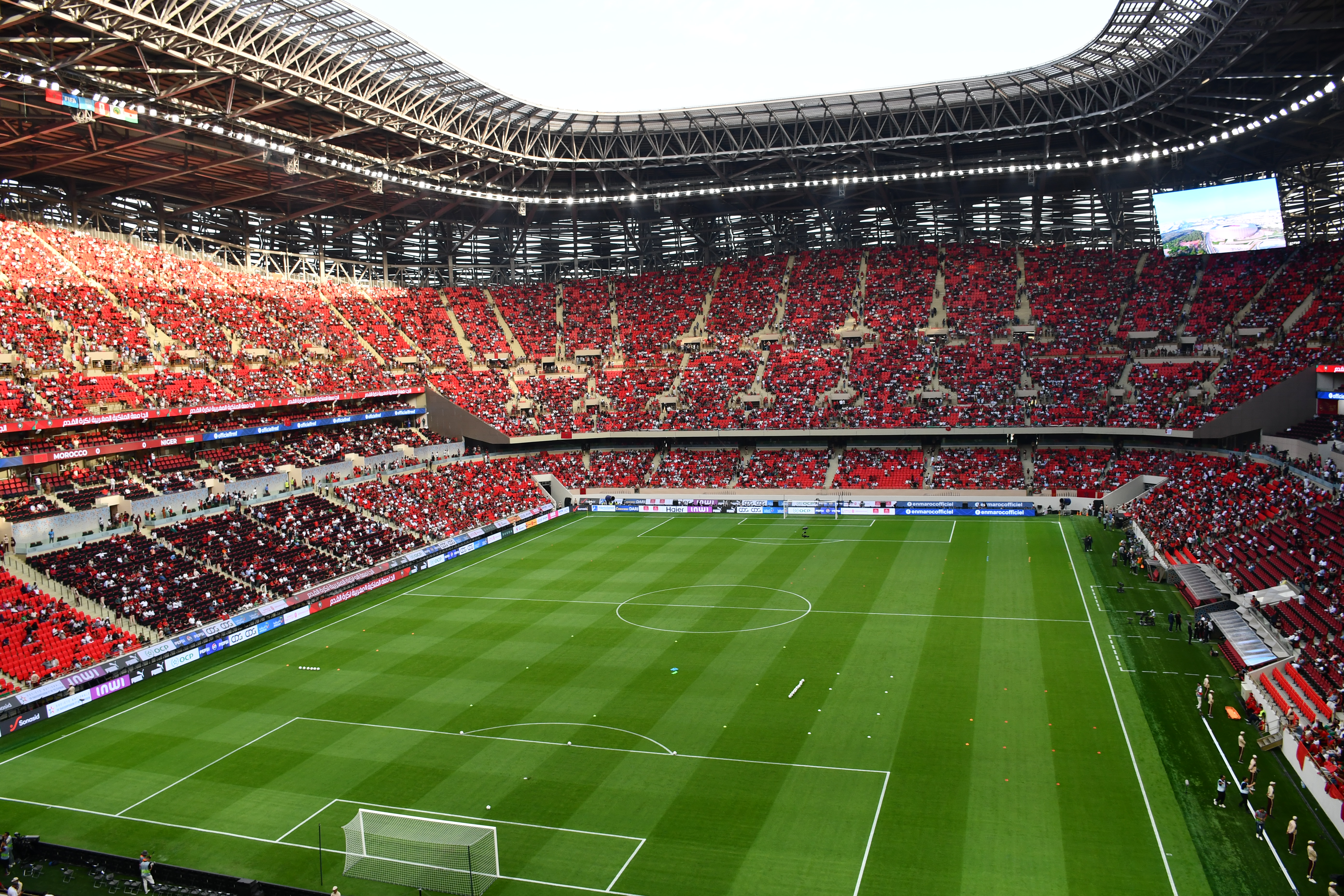
Prince Moulay Abdellah Stadium in Rabat, Morocco, hosted the second leg.

== Road to the final ==
Note: In all results below, the score of the finalist is given first (H: home; A: away).

(South Africa) Mamelodi Sundowns				Round	(Morocco) AS FAR			
Opponent	Agg	1st leg	2nd leg	Qualifying rounds	Opponent	Agg	1st leg	2nd leg
Bye				First round	(The Gambia) Real de Banjul	4–1	2–0 (A)	2–1 (H)
(Nigeria) Remo Stars	7–1	5–1 (A)	2–0 (H)	Second round	(Guinea) Horoya	4–1	1–1 (A)	3–0 (H)
Opponent	Result			Group stage	Opponent	Result		
(Democratic Republic of the Congo) Saint-Éloi Lupopo	3–1 (H)			Matchday 1	(Tanzania) Young Africans	0–1 (A)		
(Algeria) MC Alger	0–0 (A)			Matchday 2	(Egypt) Al Ahly	1–1 (H)		
(Sudan) Al Hilal	2–2 (H)			Matchday 3	(Algeria) JS Kabylie	0–0 (A)		
(Sudan) Al Hilal	1–2 (A)			Matchday 4	(Algeria) JS Kabylie	1–0 (H)		
(Democratic Republic of the Congo) Saint-Éloi Lupopo	1–1 (A)			Matchday 5	(Tanzania) Young Africans	1–0 (H)		
(Algeria) MC Alger	2–0 (H)			Matchday 6	(Egypt) Al Ahly	0–0 (A)		
**Group C runners-up**: Pos / Team / Pld / Pts; 1 / (Sudan) Al Hilal / 6 / **11**; **2** / (South Africa) Mamelodi Sundowns / **6** / **9**; 3 / (Algeria) MC Alger / 6 / **7**; 4 / (Democratic Republic of the Congo) Saint-Éloi Lupopo / 6 / **5**; Source: CAF				Final standings	**Group B runners-up**: Pos / Team / Pld / Pts; 1 / (Egypt) Al Ahly / 6 / **10**; **2** / (Morocco) AS FAR / **6** / **9**; 3 / (Tanzania) Young Africans / 6 / **8**; 4 / (Algeria) JS Kabylie / 6 / **3**; Source: CAF			
Opponent	Agg	1st leg	2nd leg	Knockout stage	Opponent	Agg	1st leg	2nd leg
(Mali) Stade Malien	3–2	3–0 (H)	0–2 (A)	Quarter-finals	(Egypt) Pyramids	3–2	1–1 (H)	2–1 (A)
(Tunisia) Espérance de Tunis	2–0	1–0 (A)	1–0 (H)	Semi-finals	(Morocco) RS Berkane	2–1	2–0 (H)	0–1 (A)

== Format ==
The final was played on a home-and-away two-legged basis.

If the aggregate score was tied after the second leg, the away goals rule were applied, and if still tied, extra time was not played, and a penalty shoot-out was used to determine the winner.

== Matches ==
=== First leg ===
==== Details ====
17 May 2026
16:00 UTC+2

Mamelodi Sundowns (South Africa)	1–0	(Morocco) AS FAR
Modiba 37'	Report

Loftus Versfeld Stadium, Pretoria
Attendance: 51,000
Referee: Jean-Jacques Ndala (DR Congo)

**Mamelodi Sundowns**	**AS FAR**

GK	30	(South Africa) Ronwen Williams (c)
DF	24	(South Africa) Keanu Cupido
DF	3	(South Africa) Khulumani Ndamane
DF	25	(South Africa) Khuliso Mudau
DF	6	(South Africa) Aubrey Modiba	(substituted off) 75'
MF	4	(South Africa) Teboho Mokoena
MF	8	(South Africa) Jayden Adams
MF	10	(Portugal) Nuno Santos	(substituted off) 80'
FW	16	(South Africa) Kutlwano Letlhaku	(substituted off) 75'
FW	17	(South Africa) Tashreeq Matthews	(substituted off) 89'
FW	12	(Colombia) Brayan León	(substituted off) 89'
Substitutes:
GK	1	(Uganda) Denis Onyango
DF	28	(South Africa) Zuko Mdunyelwa
DF	29	(Zimbabwe) Divine Lunga	(substituted on) 75'
DF	37	(South Africa) Kegan Johannes
MF	11	(Chile) Marcelo Allende	(substituted on) 80'
MF	18	(South Africa) Themba Zwane
FW	9	(Brazil) Arthur Sales	(substituted on) 89'
FW	14	(South Africa) Monnapule Saleng	(substituted on) 75'
FW	35	(South Africa) Lebo Mothiba	(substituted on) 89'
Manager:
(Portugal) Miguel Cardoso

GK	16	(Morocco) Ahmed Reda Tagnaouti
DF	2	(Angola) Tó Carneiro
DF	3	(Morocco) Anas Bach
DF	5	(Morocco) Yunis Abdelhamid
DF	15	(Morocco) Marouane Louadni
MF	8	(Morocco) Khalid Ait Ouarkhane
MF	34	(Morocco) Mohamed Rabie Hrimat (c)
MF	40	(Morocco) Abdelfattah Hadraf		(substituted off) 76'
FW	11	(Morocco) Ahmed Hammoudan
FW	10	(Morocco) Reda Slim		(substituted off) 66'
FW	7	(Morocco) Youssef El Fahli
Substitutes:
GK	1	(Morocco) Ayoub El Khayati
DF	23	(Morocco) Jamal Ech-Chamakh
DF	24	(Mauritania) Nouh Mohamed El Abd
DF	27	(Morocco) Ayoub Ait Khassou
MF	14	(Libya) Taoufik Razko
MF	19	(Morocco) Jalal-Eddine El Khfiyef
MF	26	(Republic of the Congo) Nolan Mbemba	(yellow card) 82'	(substituted on) 66'
FW	9	(Morocco) Mouhcine Bouriga		(substituted on) 76'
FW	17	(Morocco) Hamza Khabba
Manager:
(Portugal) Alexandre Santos

**Match rules**
- 90 minutes.
- Nine named substitutes, of which up to five may be used. (Note: Each team was only given three opportunities to make substitutions, excluding substitutions made at half-time.)

=== Second leg ===
==== Details ====
24 May 2026
20:00 UTC+1

AS FAR (Morocco)	1–1	(South Africa) Mamelodi Sundowns
Hrimat 40' (pen.)	Report	Mokoena 45+7'

Prince Moulay Abdellah Stadium, Rabat
Attendance: 60,000
Referee: Omar Artan (Somalia)

**AS FAR**	**Mamelodi Sundowns**

GK	16	(Morocco) Ahmed Reda Tagnaouti
DF	2	(Angola) Tó Carneiro		(substituted off) 90+5'
DF	3	(Morocco) Anas Bach	(yellow card) 45+2'
DF	4	(Senegal) Fallou Mendy
DF	15	(Morocco) Marouane Louadni	(yellow card) 4'
MF	8	(Morocco) Khalid Ait Ouarkhane
MF	34	(Morocco) Mohamed Rabie Hrimat (c)	(yellow card) 20'
MF	40	(Morocco) Abdelfattah Hadraf	(yellow card) 51'
FW	11	(Morocco) Ahmed Hammoudan		(substituted off) 79'
FW	10	(Morocco) Reda Slim		(substituted off) 90+5'
FW	7	(Morocco) Youssef El Fahli
Substitutes:
GK	1	(Morocco) Ayoub El Khayati
DF	5	(Morocco) Yunis Abdelhamid
DF	23	(Morocco) Jamal Ech-Chamakh		(substituted on) 90+5'
DF	24	(Mauritania) Nouh Mohamed El Abd
MF	14	(Libya) Taoufik Razko
MF	19	(Morocco) Jalal-Eddine El Khfiyef		(substituted on) 90+5'
MF	26	(Republic of the Congo) Nolan Mbemba
FW	9	(Morocco) Mouhcine Bouriga		(substituted on) 79'
FW	17	(Morocco) Hamza Khabba
Manager:
(Portugal) Alexandre Santos

GK	30	(South Africa) Ronwen Williams (c)
DF	24	(South Africa) Keanu Cupido	(yellow card) 89'
DF	3	(South Africa) Khulumani Ndamane
DF	25	(South Africa) Khuliso Mudau
DF	29	(Zimbabwe) Divine Lunga	(yellow card) 37'
MF	4	(South Africa) Teboho Mokoena	(yellow card) 89'
MF	8	(South Africa) Jayden Adams	(yellow card) 53'
MF	10	(Portugal) Nuno Santos		(substituted off) 64'
FW	16	(South Africa) Kutlwano Letlhaku		(substituted off) 46'
FW	17	(South Africa) Tashreeq Matthews		(substituted off) 81'
FW	12	(Colombia) Brayan León	(yellow card) 4'	(substituted off) 81'
Substitutes:
GK	1	(Uganda) Denis Onyango
DF	20	(South Africa) Grant Kekana
DF	33	(South Africa) Thato Sibiya
DF	37	(South Africa) Kegan Johannes		(substituted on) 71'
MF	11	(Chile) Marcelo Allende		(substituted on) 46'
MF	18	(South Africa) Themba Zwane		(substituted on) 90+8'
FW	9	(Brazil) Arthur Sales		(substituted on) 64' (substituted off) 90+8'
FW	13	(South Africa) Iqraam Rayners
FW	35	(South Africa) Lebo Mothiba		(substituted on) 81'
Manager:
(Portugal) Miguel Cardoso

**Match rules**
- 90 minutes.
- Penalty shoot-out if tied on aggregate.
- Nine named substitutes, of which up to five may be used.

== See also ==
- List of African Cup of Champions Clubs and CAF Champions League finals
- 2026 CAF Confederation Cup final
- 2026 CAF Super Cup
