= 2025–26 CAF Champions League qualifying rounds =

- Dates: 16 September – 1 November 2025

Tournament statistics
- Matches played: 92
- Goals scored: 185 (2.01 per match)

The 2025–26 CAF Champions League qualifying rounds began on 16 September and ended on 1 November 2025. 62 teams competed in these rounds to decide the 16 places in the group stage of the 2025–26 CAF Champions League.

All times are local.

== Draw ==
The draw for the qualifying rounds was held on 9 August 2025, 10:00 GMT (13:00 local time, UTC+3), in Dar es Salaam, Tanzania.

With 62 clubs registered to take part in the qualifying rounds, two clubs have received byes to the second round. The remaining sides have been placed in pots depending on their CAF 5-year ranking and were drawn taking into account several factors, including geographical location.

Entry round	Second round (2 teams)	First round (60 teams)	
Teams	(Egypt) Al Ahly (78 pts); (South Africa) Mamelodi Sundowns (62 pts)	Pot 1 (8 teams)	Pot 2 (14 teams)
Teams	(Egypt) Al Ahly (78 pts); (South Africa) Mamelodi Sundowns (62 pts)	(Burundi) Aigle Noir; ASAS Djibouti Télécom; (Ethiopia) Ethiopian Insurance; Kenya Police; (Rwanda) APR; (Somalia) Mogadishu City; (South Sudan) Jamus; (Zanzibar) Mlandege	(Libya) Al Ahli Tripoli (6 pts) (Note: Libyan teams were listed as Libya 1 and Libya 2 during the draw; as their identity was still unknown by the time of the draw.); (Libya) Al Hilal Benghazi (4 pts); (Benin) Dadjè; (Burkina Faso) Rahimo; (Cameroon) Colombe Sportive; (Central African Republic) AS Tempête; (Equatorial Guinea) Fundación Bata; (Gabon) Mangasport; (The Gambia) Real de Banjul; (Ghana) Bibiani Gold Stars; (Liberia) Fassell; (Niger) AS FAN; (Sierra Leone) East End Lions; (Togo) ASC Kara
Teams	(Egypt) Al Ahly (78 pts); (South Africa) Mamelodi Sundowns (62 pts)	Pot 3 (16 teams)	Pot 4 (4 teams)
Teams	(Egypt) Al Ahly (78 pts); (South Africa) Mamelodi Sundowns (62 pts)	(Democratic Republic of the Congo) Saint-Éloi Lupopo (3 pts) (Note: Congolese teams were listed as DR Congo 1 and DR Congo 2 during the draw; as their identity was still unknown by the time of the draw.); (Angola) Wiliete; (Botswana) Gaborone United; (Comoros) US Zilimadjou; (Republic of the Congo) AC Léopards; (Democratic Republic of the Congo) Aigles du Congo; (Eswatini) Nsingizini Hotspurs; (Lesotho) Lioli; (Madagascar) Elgeco Plus; (Malawi) Silver Strikers; (Mauritius) Cercle de Joachim; (Namibia) African Stars; (Nigeria) Remo Stars; (Seychelles) Côte d'Or; (Zambia) Power Dynamos; (Zimbabwe) Simba Bhora	(Guinea) Horoya (10 pts); (Mauritania) FC Nouadhibou (8.5 pts); (Senegal) ASC Jaraaf (7 pts); (Tunisia) US Monastir (6 pts)
Teams	(Egypt) Al Ahly (78 pts); (South Africa) Mamelodi Sundowns (62 pts)	Pot 5 (4 teams)	Pot 6 (2 teams)
Teams	(Egypt) Al Ahly (78 pts); (South Africa) Mamelodi Sundowns (62 pts)	(Morocco) AS FAR (21 pts); (Algeria) MC Alger (18 pts); (Algeria) JS Kabylie (13 pts); (Mali) Stade Malien (10.5 pts)	(Sudan) Al Merrikh (6 pts); (Ivory Coast) Stade d'Abidjan (5 pts); (Uganda) Vipers (3 pts); (Mozambique) Black Bulls (2.5 pts)
Teams	(Egypt) Al Ahly (78 pts); (South Africa) Mamelodi Sundowns (62 pts)	Pot 7 (4 teams)	Highest ranked teams (8 teams)
Teams	(Egypt) Al Ahly (78 pts); (South Africa) Mamelodi Sundowns (62 pts)	(Ivory Coast) ASEC Mimosas (33 pts); (South Africa) Orlando Pirates (30 pts); (Angola) Petro de Luanda (27 pts); (Nigeria) Rivers United (14 pts)	(Tunisia) Espérance de Tunis (57 pts); (Morocco) RS Berkane (52 pts); (Tanzania) Simba (48 pts); (Egypt) Pyramids (47 pts); (Sudan) Al Hilal (34 pts); (Tanzania) Young Africans (34 pts)

== Format ==
In the qualifying rounds, each tie was played on a home-and-away two-legged basis. If the aggregate score was tied after the second leg, the away goals rule was applied, and if still tied, extra time was not played, and a penalty shoot-out was used to determine the winner (Regulations III. 13 & 14).

== Schedule ==
The schedule of the competition was as follows.

Schedule for the 2025–26 CAF Champions League qualifying rounds
Round	Draw date	First leg	Second leg
First round	9 August 2025	19–21 September 2025	26–28 September 2025
Second round	9 August 2025	17–19 October 2025	24–26 October 2025

== Bracket ==
The bracket of the draw was announced by the CAF on 9 August 2025. The 16 winners of the second round advanced to the group stage.

First round					Second round
1	(Burundi) Aigle Noir (a)	0	1	1
4	ASAS Djibouti Télécom	0	1	1
4	ASAS Djibouti Télécom	0	1	1	(Burundi) Aigle Noir	0	0	0
					(Egypt) Al Ahly	1	1	2

First round
1	(Ethiopia) Ethiopian Insurance	2	2	4
4	(Zanzibar) Mlandege	0	3	3
3	(Rwanda) APR	0	0	0
2	(Egypt) Pyramids	2	3	5

Second round
(Ethiopia) Ethiopian Insurance	1	0	1
(Egypt) Pyramids	1	2	3

First round
1	(Somalia) Mogadishu City	1	2	3
4	Kenya Police (a)	3	0	3
3	(South Sudan) Jamus	0	0	0
2	(Sudan) Al Hilal	0	1	1

Second round
Kenya Police	0	1	1
(Sudan) Al Hilal	1	3	4

First round
1	(Burkina Faso) Rahimo	0	0	0 (4)
4	(Gabon) Mangasport	0	0	0 (2)
3	(Niger) AS FAN	0	1	1
2	(Tunisia) Espérance de Tunis	3	4	7

Second round
(Burkina Faso) Rahimo	0	0	0
(Tunisia) Espérance de Tunis	1	3	4

First round
1	(Benin) Dadjè	0	0	0
4	(Libya) Al Ahli Tripoli	0	1	1
3	(Togo) ASC Kara	1	1	2
2	(Morocco) RS Berkane	1	3	4

Second round
(Libya) Al Ahli Tripoli	1	1	2
(Morocco) RS Berkane	1	2	3

First round
1	(Sierra Leone) East End Lions	0	1	1
4	(Tunisia) US Monastir	4	3	7
3	(Ghana) Bibiani Gold Stars	0	0	0
2	(Algeria) JS Kabylie	2	5	7

Second round
(Tunisia) US Monastir	0	1	1
(Algeria) JS Kabylie	3	2	5

First round
1	(Equatorial Guinea) Fundación Bata	0	0	0
4	(Mauritania) FC Nouadhibou	0	2	2
3	(Central African Republic) AS Tempête	0	0	0
2	(Mali) Stade Malien	5	2	7

Second round
(Mauritania) FC Nouadhibou	1	0	1
(Mali) Stade Malien	1	2	3

First round
1	(Libya) Al Hilal Benghazi	1	0	1
4	(Guinea) Horoya	0	2	2
3	(The Gambia) Real de Banjul	0	1	1
2	(Morocco) AS FAR	2	2	4

Second round
(Guinea) Horoya	1	0	1
(Morocco) AS FAR	1	3	4

First round
1	(Cameroon) Colombe Sportive	0	1	1
4	(Senegal) ASC Jaraaf	0	0	0
3	(Liberia) Fassell	0	0	0
2	(Algeria) MC Alger	0	3	3

Second round
(Cameroon) Colombe Sportive	1	0	1
(Algeria) MC Alger (a)	1	0	1

First round					Second round
1	(Nigeria) Remo Stars	4	1	5
4	(Comoros) US Zilimadjou	0	0	0
4	(Comoros) US Zilimadjou	0	0	0	(Nigeria) Remo Stars	1	0	1
					(South Africa) Mamelodi Sundowns	5	2	7

First round
1	(Zimbabwe) Simba Bhora	1	0	1 (2)
4	(Eswatini) Nsingizini Hotspurs (p)	0	1	1 (4)
3	(Botswana) Gaborone United	0	1	1
2	(Tanzania) Simba	1	1	2

Second round
(Eswatini) Nsingizini Hotspurs	0	0	0
(Tanzania) Simba	3	0	3

First round
1	(Madagascar) Elgeco Plus	1	0	1
4	(Malawi) Silver Strikers (a)	1	0	1
3	(Angola) Wiliete	0	0	0
2	(Tanzania) Young Africans	3	2	5

Second round
(Malawi) Silver Strikers	1	0	1
(Tanzania) Young Africans	0	2	2

First round
1	(Seychelles) Côte d'Or	0	1	1
4	(Ivory Coast) Stade d'Abidjan	2	3	5
3	(Mauritius) Cercle de Joachim	0	0	0
2	(Angola) Petro de Luanda	3	3	6

Second round
(Ivory Coast) Stade d'Abidjan	0	0	0
(Angola) Petro de Luanda	2	2	4

First round
1	(Republic of the Congo) AC Léopards	0	0	0 (4)
4	(Mozambique) Black Bulls (p)	0	0	0 (5)
3	(Democratic Republic of the Congo) Aigles du Congo	0	0	0
2	(Nigeria) Rivers United	0	1	1

Second round
(Mozambique) Black Bulls	1	1	2
(Nigeria) Rivers United	0	3	3

First round
1	(Namibia) African Stars	0	0	0
4	(Uganda) Vipers	1	1	2
3	(Zambia) Power Dynamos (p)	1	0	1 (5)
2	(Ivory Coast) ASEC Mimosas	0	1	1 (4)

Second round
(Uganda) Vipers	1	1	2
(Zambia) Power Dynamos	2	1	3

First round
1	(Democratic Republic of the Congo) Saint-Éloi Lupopo	1	0	1
4	(Sudan) Al Merrikh	0	0	0
3	(Lesotho) Lioli	0	0	0
2	(South Africa) Orlando Pirates	3	4	7

Second round
(Democratic Republic of the Congo) Saint-Éloi Lupopo	3	0	3 (5)
(South Africa) Orlando Pirates	0	3	3 (4)

== First round ==
The first round, also called the first preliminary round, included the 60 teams that did not receive byes to the second round.

Team 1	Agg.	Team 2	1st leg	2nd leg
Aigle Noir (Burundi)	1–1 (a)	ASAS Djibouti Télécom	0–0	1–1
Ethiopian Insurance (Ethiopia)	4–3	(Zanzibar) Mlandege	2–0	2–3
APR (Rwanda)	0–5	(Egypt) Pyramids	0–2	0–3
Mogadishu City (Somalia)	3–3 (a)	Kenya Police	1–3	2–0
Jamus (South Sudan)	0–1	(Sudan) Al Hilal	0–0	0–1
Rahimo (Burkina Faso)	0–0 (4–2 p)	(Gabon) Mangasport	0–0	0–0
AS FAN (Niger)	1–7	(Tunisia) Espérance de Tunis	0–3	1–4
Dadjè (Benin)	0–1	(Libya) Al Ahli Tripoli	0–0	0–1
ASC Kara (Togo)	2–4	(Morocco) RS Berkane	1–1	1–3
East End Lions (Sierra Leone)	1–7	(Tunisia) US Monastir	0–4	1–3
Bibiani Gold Stars (Ghana)	0–7	(Algeria) JS Kabylie	0–2	0–5
Fundación Bata (Equatorial Guinea)	0–2	(Mauritania) FC Nouadhibou	0–0	0–2
AS Tempête (Central African Republic)	0–7	(Mali) Stade Malien	0–5	0–2
Al Hilal Benghazi (Libya)	1–2	(Guinea) Horoya	1–0	0–2
Real de Banjul (The Gambia)	1–4	(Morocco) AS FAR	0–2	1–2
Colombe Sportive (Cameroon)	1–0	(Senegal) ASC Jaraaf	0–0	1–0
Fassell (Liberia)	0–3	(Algeria) MC Alger	0–0	0–3
Remo Stars (Nigeria)	5–0	(Comoros) US Zilimadjou	4–0	1–0
Simba Bhora (Zimbabwe)	1–1 (2–4 p)	(Eswatini) Nsingizini Hotspurs	1–0	0–1
Gaborone United (Botswana)	1–2	(Tanzania) Simba	0–1	1–1
Elgeco Plus (Madagascar)	1–1 (a)	(Malawi) Silver Strikers	1–1	0–0
Wiliete (Angola)	0–5	(Tanzania) Young Africans	0–3	0–2
Côte d'Or (Seychelles)	1–5	(Ivory Coast) Stade d'Abidjan	0–2	1–3
Cercle de Joachim (Mauritius)	0–6	(Angola) Petro de Luanda	0–3	0–3
AC Léopards (Republic of the Congo)	0–0 (4–5 p)	(Mozambique) Black Bulls	0–0	0–0
Aigles du Congo (Democratic Republic of the Congo)	0–1	(Nigeria) Rivers United	0–0	0–1
African Stars (Namibia)	0–2	(Uganda) Vipers	0–1	0–1
Power Dynamos (Zambia)	1–1 (5–4 p)	(Ivory Coast) ASEC Mimosas	1–0	0–1
Saint-Éloi Lupopo (Democratic Republic of the Congo)	1–0	(Sudan) Al Merrikh	1–0	0–0
Lioli (Lesotho)	0–7	(South Africa) Orlando Pirates	0–3	0–4

21 September 2025
15:00 UTC+2

Aigle Noir (Burundi)	0–0	ASAS Djibouti Télécom
	Report

Intwari Stadium, Bujumbura
27 September 2025
14:00 UTC+3

ASAS Djibouti Télécom	1–1	(Burundi) Aigle Noir
Sudi 45+3' (pen.)	Report	Ndayikengurukiye 64'

Abebe Bikila Stadium, Addis Ababa (Ethiopia)

1–1 on aggregate. Aigle Noir won on away goals.

20 September 2025
15:00 UTC+3

Ethiopian Insurance (Ethiopia)	2–0	(Zanzibar) Mlandege
Erbo 25'; Mulugeta 58'	Report

Abebe Bikila Stadium, Addis Ababa
27 September 2025
16:15 UTC+3

Mlandege (Zanzibar)	3–2	(Ethiopia) Ethiopian Insurance
	Report

Amaan Stadium, Zanzibar City

Ethiopian Insurance won 4–3 on aggregate.

1 October 2025
14:00 UTC+2

APR (Rwanda)	0–2	(Egypt) Pyramids
	Report	Mayele 49', 86'

Kigali Pelé Stadium, Kigali
5 October 2025
20:00 UTC+3

Pyramids (Egypt)	3–0	(Rwanda) APR
Ziko 43'; Atef 61'; Hamdy 63'	Report

30 June Stadium, Cairo

Pyramids won 5–0 on aggregate.

20 September 2025
16:00 UTC+3

Mogadishu City (Somalia)	1–3	Kenya Police
Marsis 50'	Report	Zakayo 15'; Omondi 57'; Simiyu 70'

Nyayo National Stadium, Nairobi (Kenya)
28 September 2025
18:00 UTC+3

Kenya Police	0–2	(Somalia) Mogadishu City
	Report	Marsis 33'; Bangura 55' (pen.)

Nyayo National Stadium, Nairobi

3–3 on aggregate. Kenya Police won on away goals.

21 September 2025
15:00 UTC+2

Jamus (South Sudan)	0–0	(Sudan) Al Hilal
	Report

Juba Stadium, Juba
28 September 2025
19:00 UTC+3

Al Hilal (Sudan)	1–0	(South Sudan) Jamus
Girumugisha 24'	Report

Amaan Stadium, Zanzibar City (Zanzibar)

Al Hilal won 1–0 on aggregate.

20 September 2025
16:00 UTC+0

Rahimo (Burkina Faso)	0–0	(Gabon) Mangasport
	Report

Stade du 4 Août, Ouagadougou
28 September 2025
15:30 UTC+1

Mangasport (Gabon)	0–0	(Burkina Faso) Rahimo
	Report
Penalties
	2–4

Stade de Franceville, Franceville

0–0 on aggregate. Rahimo won 4–2 on penalties.

21 September 2025
15:30 UTC+1

AS FAN (Niger)	0–3	(Tunisia) Espérance de Tunis
		Boualia 4'; Diakité 54', 86'

Stade Général Seyni Kountché, Niamey
Referee: Ousmane Diakité (Mali)
27 September 2025
18:00 UTC+1

Espérance de Tunis (Tunisia)	4–1	(Niger) AS FAN
Belaïli 19'; Sasse 37'; Keita 65'; Meriah 90+4' (pen.)	Report	Addae 33'

Hammadi Agrebi Stadium, Tunis
Referee: Ruth Bilembi (Congo)

Espérance de Tunis won 7–1 on aggregate.

19 September 2025
14:00 UTC+0

Dadjè (Benin)	0–0	(Libya) Al Ahli Tripoli
	Report

Stade de Kégué, Lomé (Togo)
28 September 2025
20:00 UTC+2

Al Ahli Tripoli (Libya)	1–0	(Benin) Dadjè
Winsavi 57' (o.g.)	Report

Tripoli Stadium, Tripoli

Al Ahli Tripoli won 1–0 on aggregate.

21 September 2025
15:00 UTC+0

ASC Kara (Togo)	1–1	(Morocco) RS Berkane
Ouro-Ayeva 47'	Report	Lamlioui 77'

Stade de Kégué, Lomé
27 September 2025
21:00 UTC+1

RS Berkane (Morocco)	3–1	(Togo) ASC Kara
Lamlioui 14', 39'; Khairi 18'	Report	Tagba 55'

Berkane Municipal Stadium, Berkane

RS Berkane won 4–2 on aggregate.

21 September 2025
16:00 UTC+1

East End Lions (Sierra Leone)	0–4	(Tunisia) US Monastir
	Report	Bari 35' (o.g.); Amri 61'; Bodian 89'; Elhmidi 90+5'

Hammadi Agrebi Stadium, Tunis (Tunisia)
28 September 2025
15:00 UTC+1

US Monastir (Tunisia)	3–1	(Sierra Leone) East End Lions
Zeguei 2'; Ali 7'; Kamara 71' (o.g.)	Report	Conteh 49'

Taieb Mhiri Stadium, Sfax

US Monastir won 7–1 on aggregate.

20 September 2025
15:00 UTC+0

Bibiani Gold Stars (Ghana)	0–2	(Algeria) JS Kabylie
	Report	Merghem 21'; Sarr 71'

Accra Sports Stadium, Accra
Referee: Georges Gotogato (Burundi)
28 September 2025
20:00 UTC+1

JS Kabylie (Algeria)	5–0	(Ghana) Bibiani Gold Stars
Kobi 7' (o.g.); Boudebouz 29'; Merghem 64'; Akhrib 68'; Malki 90+1'	Report

Hocine Aït Ahmed Stadium, Tizi Ouzou
Referee: Rashid Conteh (Sierra Leone)

JS Kabylie won 7–0 on aggregate.

21 September 2025
15:00 UTC+1

Fundación Bata (Equatorial Guinea)	0–0	(Mauritania) FC Nouadhibou
	Report

Estadio de Malabo, Malabo
28 September 2025
19:00 UTC+0

FC Nouadhibou (Mauritania)	2–0	(Equatorial Guinea) Fundación Bata
El Welly 20'; Hattab 72' (pen.)	Report

Nouadhibou Municipal Stadium, Nouadhibou

FC Nouadhibou won 2–0 on aggregate.

21 September 2025
15:00 UTC+1

AS Tempête (Central African Republic)	0–5	(Mali) Stade Malien
	Report	O. Coulibaly 11', 60'; Simpara 38'; Nkeng 76'; D. Coulibaly 89'

Japoma Stadium, Douala (Cameroon)
27 September 2025
16:30 UTC+0

Stade Malien (Mali)	2–0	(Central African Republic) AS Tempête
O. Coulibaly 38'; Simpara 90+1'	Report

Stade du 26 Mars, Bamako

Stade Malien won 7–0 on aggregate.

20 September 2025
19:30 UTC+2

Al Hilal Benghazi (Libya)	1–0	(Guinea) Horoya
Al-Maghasi 14'	Report

First Statement Stadium, Benghazi
27 September 2025
16:30 UTC+0

Horoya (Guinea)	2–0	(Libya) Al Hilal Benghazi
Barry 30'; Keita 90'	Report

Stade Mamadou Konaté, Bamako (Mali)

Horoya won 2–1 on aggregate.

21 September 2025
20:00 UTC+1

Real de Banjul (The Gambia)	0–2	(Morocco) AS FAR
	Report

Rabat Olympic Stadium, Rabat (Morocco)
27 September 2025
20:00 UTC+1

AS FAR (Morocco)	2–1	(The Gambia) Real de Banjul
Carneiro 18'; Slim 56' (pen.)	Report	Cesay 78'

Rabat Olympic Stadium, Rabat

AS FAR won 4–1 on aggregate.

21 September 2025
14:00 UTC+1

Colombe Sportive (Cameroon)	0–0	(Senegal) ASC Jaraaf
	Report

Ahmadou Ahidjo Stadium, Yaoundé
28 September 2025
17:00 UTC+0

ASC Jaraaf (Senegal)	0–1	(Cameroon) Colombe Sportive
	Report	Musah 60'

Stade Lat-Dior, Thiès

Colombe Sportive won 1–0 on aggregate.

20 September 2025
16:00 UTC+0

Fassell (Liberia)	0–0	(Algeria) MC Alger
	Report

Samuel Kanyon Doe Sports Complex, Monrovia
27 September 2025
20:00 UTC+1

MC Alger (Algeria)	3–0	(Liberia) Fassell
Abdellaoui 19'; Bayazid 45+1'; Messoussa 90+1'	Report

Ali La Pointe Stadium, Algiers
Referee: Lamin Jammeh (Gambia)

MC Alger won 3–0 on aggregate.

21 September 2025
16:00 UTC+1

Remo Stars (Nigeria)	4–0	(Comoros) US Zilimadjou
Ngenge 12'; Anthony 45'; Goita 68'; Olasupo 79'	Report

MKO Abiola Stadium, Abeokuta
26 September 2025
16:00 UTC+1

US Zilimadjou (Comoros)	0–1	(Nigeria) Remo Stars
	Report	Oyowah 74'

MKO Abiola Stadium, Abeokuta (Nigeria)

Remo Stars won 5–0 on aggregate.

21 September 2025
20:00 UTC+2

Simba Bhora (Zimbabwe)	1–0	(Eswatini) Nsingizini Hotspurs
Nyanhi 56'	Report

Obed Itani Chilume Stadium, Francistown (Botswana)
28 September 2025
15:00 UTC+2

Nsingizini Hotspurs (Eswatini)	1–0	(Zimbabwe) Simba Bhora
Shongwe 89'	Report
Penalties
	4–2

Somhlolo National Stadium, Lobamba

1–1 on aggregate. Nsingizini Hotspurs won 4–2 on penalties.

20 September 2025
19:00 UTC+2

Gaborone United (Botswana)	0–1	(Tanzania) Simba
	Report	Mpanzu 16'

Botswana National Stadium, Gaborone
28 September 2025
16:00 UTC+3

Simba (Tanzania)	1–1	(Botswana) Gaborone United
Ahoua 43' (pen.)	Report	Ditsele 66' (pen.)

Benjamin Mkapa Stadium, Dar es Salaam

Simba won 2–1 on aggregate.

21 September 2025
14:00 UTC+4

Elgeco Plus (Madagascar)	1–1	(Malawi) Silver Strikers
Tony 13'	Report	Joseph 55'

National Sports Complex Pitch 1, Saint Pierre (Mauritius)
27 September 2025
15:00 UTC+2

Silver Strikers (Malawi)	0–0	(Madagascar) Elgeco Plus
	Report

Bingu National Stadium, Lilongwe

1–1 on aggregate. Silver Strikers won on away goals.

19 September 2025
16:00 UTC+1

Wiliete (Angola)	0–3	(Tanzania) Young Africans
	Report	Andabwile 31'; Godfrey 72'; Dube 81'

Estádio 11 de Novembro, Luanda
Referee: Nidhal Letaief (Tunisia)
27 September 2025
17:00 UTC+3

Young Africans (Tanzania)	2–0	(Angola) Wiliete
Pacóme Zouzoua 71'; Aziz Andabwile 87'	Report

Benjamin Mkapa Stadium, Dar es Salaam

Young Africans won 5–0 on aggregate.

16 September 2025
16:00 UTC+4

Côte d'Or (Seychelles)	0–2	(Ivory Coast) Stade d'Abidjan
	Report	Sangaré 35'; Bagnama 45'

National Sports Complex Pitch 1, Saint Pierre (Mauritius)
24 September 2025
16:00 UTC+0

Stade d'Abidjan (Ivory Coast)	3–1	(Seychelles) Côte d'Or
Bagnama 12', 43'; Sangaré 45'	Report	Mbolatovo 66'

Felix Houphouet Boigny Stadium, Abidjan

Stade d'Abidjan won 5–1 on aggregate.

20 September 2025
18:00 UTC+4

Cercle de Joachim (Mauritius)	0–3	(Angola) Petro de Luanda
	Report	Dias 19'; Reis 30'; Matheus Costa 90+3'

National Sports Complex Pitch 1, Saint Pierre
27 September 2025
17:00 UTC+1

Petro de Luanda (Angola)	3–0	(Mauritius) Cercle de Joachim
Tiago Reis 8'; Vanilson 31'; Aparício 50'	Report

Estádio 11 de Novembro, Luanda

Petro de Luanda won 6–0 on aggregate.

21 September 2025
15:30 UTC+1

AC Léopards (Republic of the Congo)	0–0	(Mozambique) Black Bulls
	Report

Stade Alphonse Massemba-Débat, Brazzaville
27 September 2025
15:00 UTC+2

Black Bulls (Mozambique)	0–0	(Republic of the Congo) AC Léopards
	Report
Penalties
	5–4

Campo da ABB, Maputo

0–0 on aggregate. Black Bulls won 5–4 on penalties.

20 September 2025
15:30 UTC+1

Aigles du Congo (Democratic Republic of the Congo)	0–0	(Nigeria) Rivers United
	Report

Stade des Martyrs, Kinshasa
28 September 2025
16:00 UTC+1

Rivers United (Nigeria)	1–0	(Democratic Republic of the Congo) Aigles du Congo
Manyo 45+6'	Report

Godswill Akpabio International Stadium, Uyo

Rivers United won 1–0 on aggregate.

19 September 2025
18:00 UTC+2

African Stars (Namibia)	0–1	(Uganda) Vipers
	Report	Mukundane 16'

Athlone Stadium, Cape Town (South Africa)
27 September 2025
19:00 UTC+3

Vipers (Uganda)	1–0	(Namibia) African Stars
Sentamu 62'	Report

St. Mary's Stadium-Kitende, Entebbe

Vipers won 2–0 on aggregate.

20 September 2025
15:00 UTC+2

Power Dynamos (Zambia)	1–0	(Ivory Coast) ASEC Mimosas
Kashita 8'	Report

Levy Mwanawasa Stadium, Ndola
28 September 2025
16:00 UTC+0

ASEC Mimosas (Ivory Coast)	1–0	(Zambia) Power Dynamos
Fofana 53'	Report
Penalties
Gbakre (penalty scored); Samassa (penalty scored); Dosso (penalty scored); Issouf (penalty scored); Amoussou (penalty missed)	4–5	(penalty scored) Shumah; (penalty scored) Chansa; (penalty scored) Chiboni; (penalty scored) Bamidele; (penalty scored) Mphasi

Felix Houphouet Boigny Stadium, Abidjan

1–1 on aggregate. Power Dynamos won 5–4 on penalties.

27 September 2025
15:00 UTC+2

Saint-Éloi Lupopo (Democratic Republic of the Congo)	1–0	(Sudan) Al Merrikh
Katumbwe 84'	Report

Stade Frederic Kibassa Maliba, Lubumbashi
4 October 2025
18:00 UTC+2

Al Merrikh (Sudan)	0–0	(Democratic Republic of the Congo) Saint-Éloi Lupopo
	Report

Benina Martyrs Stadium, Benghazi (Libya)
Referee: Mehrez Melki (Tunisia)

Saint-Éloi Lupopo won 1–0 on aggregate.

20 September 2025
15:00 UTC+2

Lioli (Lesotho)	0–3	(South Africa) Orlando Pirates
	Report	Mabasa 54', 57'; Appollis 90+3'

Free State Stadium, Bloemfontein (South Africa)
27 September 2025
15:00 UTC+2

Orlando Pirates (South Africa)	4–0	(Lesotho) Lioli
Moremi 45+3', 48'; Mbuthuma 78', 80'	Report

Orlando Stadium, Johannesburg

Orlando Pirates won 7–0 on aggregate.

== Second round ==
The second round, also called the second preliminary round, included 32 teams: the 2 teams that received byes to this round, and the 30 winners of the first round.

Team 1	Agg.	Team 2	1st leg	2nd leg
Aigle Noir (Burundi)	0–2	(Egypt) Al Ahly	0–1	0–1
Ethiopian Insurance (Ethiopia)	1–3	(Egypt) Pyramids	1–1	0–2
Kenya Police	1–4	(Sudan) Al Hilal	0–1	1–3
Rahimo (Burkina Faso)	0–4	(Tunisia) Espérance de Tunis	0–1	0–3
Al Ahli Tripoli (Libya)	2–3	(Morocco) RS Berkane	1–1	1–2
US Monastir (Tunisia)	1–5	(Algeria) JS Kabylie	0–3	1–2
FC Nouadhibou (Mauritania)	1–3	(Mali) Stade Malien	1–1	0–2
Horoya (Guinea)	1–4	(Morocco) AS FAR	1–1	0–3
Colombe Sportive (Cameroon)	1–1 (a)	(Algeria) MC Alger	1–1	0–0
Remo Stars (Nigeria)	1–7	(South Africa) Mamelodi Sundowns	1–5	0–2
Nsingizini Hotspurs (Eswatini)	0–3	(Tanzania) Simba	0–3	0–0
Silver Strikers (Malawi)	1–2	(Tanzania) Young Africans	1–0	0–2
Stade d'Abidjan (Ivory Coast)	0–4	(Angola) Petro de Luanda	0–2	0–2
Black Bulls (Mozambique)	2–3	(Nigeria) Rivers United	1–0	1–3
Vipers (Uganda)	2–3	(Zambia) Power Dynamos	1–2	1–1
Saint-Éloi Lupopo (Democratic Republic of the Congo)	3–3 (5–4 p)	(South Africa) Orlando Pirates	3–0	0–3

18 October 2025
15:00 UTC+2

Aigle Noir (Burundi)	0–1	(Egypt) Al Ahly
	Report	Iragi 36' (o.g.)

Intwari Stadium, Bujumbura
Referee: Luxolo Badi (South Africa)
25 October 2025
20:00 UTC+3

Al Ahly (Egypt)	1–0	(Burundi) Aigle Noir
Omar Kamal Abdelwahed 58'	Report

Cairo International Stadium, Cairo
Referee: Issa Sy (Senegal)

Al Ahly won 2–0 on aggregate.

26 October 2025
19:00 UTC+3

Ethiopian Insurance (Ethiopia)	1–1	(Egypt) Pyramids
Mulugeta 83'	Report	Mayele 11'

30 June Stadium, Cairo, (Egypt)
Referee: Keabetswe Dintwa (Botswana)
30 October 2025
19:00 UTC+3

Pyramids (Egypt)	2–0	(Ethiopia) Ethiopian Insurance
Ziko 11'; Ewerton 90+1'	Report

30 June Stadium, Cairo

Pyramids won 3–1 on aggregate.

17 October 2025
15:00 UTC+3

Kenya Police	0–1	(Sudan) Al Hilal
	Report	Coulibaly 20'

Ulinzi Sports Complex, Nairobi
Referee: Rodrigue Bigirimana (Burundi)
24 October 2025
18:00 UTC+2

Al Hilal (Sudan)	3–1	Kenya Police
Adetunji 37', 64'; M'Bareck 90+5'	Report	Zakayo 53'

Benina Martyrs Stadium, Benghazi (Libya)

Al Hilal won 4–1 on aggregate.

18 October 2025
16:00 UTC+0

Rahimo (Burkina Faso)	0–1	(Tunisia) Espérance de Tunis
	Report	Danho 45+7'

Stade du 4 Août, Ouagadougou
Referee: Boubou Traoré (Mali)
26 October 2025
17:00 UTC+1

Espérance de Tunis (Tunisia)	3–0	(Burkina Faso) Rahimo
Jelassi 33'; Danho 51'; Jabri 72'	Report

Hammadi Agrebi Stadium, Tunis
Referee: Jalal Jayed (Morocco)

Espérance de Tunis won 4–0 on aggregate.

26 October 2025
18:00 UTC+2

Al Ahli Tripoli (Libya)	1–1	(Morocco) RS Berkane
Mabululu 72'	Report	Bassène 69'

Tripoli Stadium, Tripoli
1 November 2025
20:00 UTC+1

RS Berkane (Morocco)	2–1	(Libya) Al Ahli Tripoli
Bassène 28'; Khairi 54'	Report	Ellafi 10'

Berkane Municipal Stadium, Berkane

RS Berkane won 3–2 on aggregate.

17 October 2025
15:00 UTC+1

US Monastir (Tunisia)	0–3	(Algeria) JS Kabylie
	Report	Merghem 49'; Akhrib 64'; Sarr 89'

Taieb Mhiri Stadium, Sfax
Referee: Pierre Ghislain Atcho (Gabon)
25 October 2025
19:00 UTC+1

JS Kabylie (Algeria)	2–1	(Tunisia) US Monastir
Akhrib 8', 90+3'	Report	Chikhaoui 22'

Hocine Aït Ahmed Stadium, Tizi Ouzou
Referee: Mutaz Ibrahim (Libya)

JS Kabylie won 5–1 on aggregate.

19 October 2025
19:00 UTC+0

FC Nouadhibou (Mauritania)	1–1	(Mali) Stade Malien
Dembélé 85'	Report	Coulibaly 40'

Nouadhibou Municipal Stadium, Nouadhibou
Referee: Lamin Jammeh (Gambia)
26 October 2025
16:00 UTC+0

Stade Malien (Mali)	2–0	(Mauritania) FC Nouadhibou
Nkeng 42', 78'	Report

Stade du 26 Mars, Bamako
Referee: Washington Dolo (Liberia)

Stade Malien won 3–1 on aggregate.

19 October 2025
16:00 UTC+0

Horoya (Guinea)	1–1	(Morocco) AS FAR
Sylla 22'	Report	Khabba 62'

Stade Mamadou Konaté, Bamako (Mali)
Referee: Jean-Jacques Ndala (DR Congo)
25 October 2025
20:00 UTC+1

AS FAR (Morocco)	3–0	(Guinea) Horoya
Hrimat 43' (pen.); Kaba 70' (o.g.); Ech-Chammakh 90'	Report

Prince Moulay Abdellah Stadium, Rabat

AS FAR won 4–1 on aggregate.

19 October 2025
14:00 UTC+1

Colombe Sportive (Cameroon)	1–1	(Algeria) MC Alger
Loemba 14'	Report	Ghezala 85'

Ahmadou Ahidjo Stadium, Yaoundé
Referee: Mohamed Athoumani (Comoros)
26 October 2025
20:00 UTC+1

MC Alger (Algeria)	0–0	(Cameroon) Colombe Sportive
	Report

Ali La Pointe Stadium, Algiers
Referee: Charles Benle Bulu (Ghana)

1–1 on aggregate. MC Alger won on away goals.

19 October 2025
16:00 UTC+1

Remo Stars (Nigeria)	1–5	(South Africa) Mamelodi Sundowns
Olasupo 77'	Report	Matthews 12'; Shalulile 42'; Reisinho 61'; Sales 75'; Ntsabeleng 85'

MKO Abiola Stadium, Abeokuta
Referee: Abdou Abdel Mefire (Cameroon)
26 October 2025
15:30 UTC+2

Mamelodi Sundowns (South Africa)	2–0	(Nigeria) Remo Stars
Santos 21'; Shalulile 45'	Report

Loftus Versfeld Stadium, Pretoria
Referee: Dick Okello (Uganda)

Mamelodi Sundowns won 7–1 on aggregate.

19 October 2025
15:00 UTC+2

Nsingizini Hotspurs (Eswatini)	0–3	(Tanzania) Simba
	Report	Nangu 45+2'; Denisi 84', 90'

Somhlolo National Stadium, Lobamba
Referee: Auladyo Pariz (São Tomé and Príncipe)
26 October 2025
16:00 UTC+3

Simba (Tanzania)	0–0	(Eswatini) Nsingizini Hotspurs
	Report

Benjamin Mkapa Stadium, Dar es Salaam
Referee: Grema Mohammed (Nigeria)

Simba won 3–0 on aggregate.

18 October 2025
15:00 UTC+2

Silver Strikers (Malawi)	1–0	(Tanzania) Young Africans
Yosefe 76'	Report

Bingu National Stadium, Lilongwe
Referee: Gerson Esono (Equatorial Guinea)
25 October 2025
18:00 UTC+3

Young Africans (Tanzania)	2–0	(Malawi) Silver Strikers
Job 6'; Zouzoua 34'	Report

Benjamin Mkapa Stadium, Dar es Salaam
Referee: Raphiou Ligali (Benin)

Young Africans won 2–1 on aggregate.

18 October 2025
16:00 UTC+0

Stade d'Abidjan (Ivory Coast)	0–2	(Angola) Petro de Luanda
	Report	Benny Dias 82'; Vanilson 90+2'

Alassane Ouattara Stadium, Abidjan
Referee: Dahane Beida (Mauritania)
25 October 2025
17:00 UTC+1

Petro de Luanda (Angola)	2–0	(Ivory Coast) Stade d'Abidjan
Tiago Reis 20', 46'	Report

Estádio 11 de Novembro, Luanda
Referee: Cumar Cabdiqaadir Cartan (Somalia)

Petro de Luanda won 4–0 on aggregate.

18 October 2025
15:00 UTC+2

Black Bulls (Mozambique)	1–0	(Nigeria) Rivers United
Diallo 50'	Report

Campo da ABB, Maputo
Referee: Mweshitsama Naftal (Namibia)
25 October 2025
16:00 UTC+1

Rivers United (Nigeria)	3–1	(Mozambique) Black Bulls
Falolu 15'; Maclyn 42' (pen.); Zechariah 76'	Report	Diallo 47'

Godswill Akpabio International Stadium, Uyo
Referee: Kouassi Biro (Ivory Coast)

Rivers United won 3–2 on aggregate.

19 October 2025
19:00 UTC+3

Vipers (Uganda)	1–2	(Zambia) Power Dynamos
Sentamu 47'	Report	Shumah 53'; Ndahiro 76' (o.g.)

St. Mary's Stadium-Kitende, Entebbe
24 October 2025
15:00 UTC+2

Power Dynamos (Zambia)	1–1	(Uganda) Vipers
Shumah 68'	Report	Watambala 80'

Levy Mwanawasa Stadium, Ndola

Power Dynamos won 3–2 on aggregate.

19 October 2025
15:00 UTC+2

Saint-Éloi Lupopo (Democratic Republic of the Congo)	3–0	(South Africa) Orlando Pirates
Kashala 3'; Kambou 70'; Tukumbane 88'	Report

Stade Frederic Kibassa Maliba, Lubumbashi
25 October 2025
15:00 UTC+2

Orlando Pirates (South Africa)	3–0	(Democratic Republic of the Congo) Saint-Éloi Lupopo
Nemtajela 39'; Mbuthuma 68'; Appollis 90+5'	Report
Penalties
Hotto (penalty missed); Dlamini (penalty scored); Seema (penalty scored); Appollis (penalty scored); Maswanganyi (penalty scored); Mbuthuma (penalty missed)	4–5	(penalty scored) Katumbwe; (penalty scored) Mavungu; (penalty scored) Kimputu; (penalty missed) Mpeko; (penalty scored) Kambou; (penalty scored) Matukala

Orlando Stadium, Johannesburg

3–3 on aggregate. Saint-Éloi Lupopo won 5–4 on penalties.

== See also ==
- 2025–26 CAF Confederation Cup qualifying rounds
