= 2025–26 CAF Champions League group stage =

International football competition

- Dates: 21 November 2025 – 15 February 2026

Tournament statistics
- Matches played: 48
- Goals scored: 91 (1.9 per match)

The 2025–26 CAF Champions League group stage began on 21 November 2025 and ended on 15 February 2026. 16 teams competed in the group stage to decide the eight places in the knockout stage of the 2025–26 CAF Champions League.

== Draw ==
The draw for the group stage was held on 3 November 2025, 12:00 GMT (14:00 local time, UTC+2), in Johannesburg, South Africa. The 16 winners of the second round of qualifying rounds were drawn into four groups of four.

The teams were seeded by their performances in the CAF competitions for the previous five seasons (CAF 5-year ranking points shown next to every team). Each group contained one team from each of Pot 1, Pot 2, Pot 3, and Pot 4, and each team was allocated to the positions in their group according to their pot.

Pot 1
Team	Pts
(Egypt) Al Ahly	78
(South Africa) Mamelodi Sundowns	62
(Tunisia) Espérance de Tunis	57
(Morocco) RS Berkane	52

Pot 2
Team	Pts
(Tanzania) Simba	48
(Egypt) Pyramids	47
(Sudan) Al Hilal	34
(Tanzania) Young Africans	34

Pot 3
Team	Pts
(Angola) Petro de Luanda	27
(Morocco) AS FAR	21
(Algeria) MC Alger	18
(Nigeria) Rivers United	14

Pot 4
Team	Pts
(Algeria) JS Kabylie	13
(Mali) Stade Malien	10.5
(Democratic Republic of the Congo) Saint-Éloi Lupopo	3
(Zambia) Power Dynamos	—

== Format ==
In the group stage, each group was played on a home-and-away round-robin basis. The winners and runners-up of each group advanced to the quarter-finals of the knockout stage.

=== Tiebreakers ===
The teams were ranked according to points (3 points for a win, 1 point for a draw, 0 points for a loss). If tied on points, tiebreakers were applied in the following order (Regulations III. 20 & 21):

1. Points in head-to-head matches among tied teams;
2. Goal difference in head-to-head matches among tied teams;
3. Goals scored in head-to-head matches among tied teams;
4. Away goals scored in head-to-head matches among tied teams;
5. If more than two teams were tied, and after applying all head-to-head criteria above, a subset of teams was still tied, all head-to-head criteria above were reapplied exclusively to this subset of teams;
6. Goal difference in all group matches;
7. Goals scored in all group matches;
8. Away goals scored in all group matches;
9. Drawing of lots.

== Schedule ==
The schedule of each matchday was as follows.

Matchday	Dates
Matchday 1	21–23 November 2025
Matchday 2	28–30 November 2025
Matchday 3	23–25 January 2026
Matchday 4	30 January – 1 February 2026
Matchday 5	6–8 February 2026
Matchday 6	13–15 February 2026

== Groups ==
All times are local.

=== Group A ===
Pos	Team	Pld	W	D	L	GF	GA	GD	Pts	Qualification	PYR	RSB	PDFC	RUFC
1	(Egypt) Pyramids	6	5	1	0	14	2	+12	16	Advance to knockout stage	—	3–0	3–1	3–0
2	(Morocco) RS Berkane	6	3	1	2	8	6	+2	10	Advance to knockout stage	0–0	—	3–0	3–0
3	(Zambia) Power Dynamos	6	2	1	3	4	7	−3	7		0–1	2–0	—	0–0
4	(Nigeria) Rivers United	6	0	1	5	2	13	−11	1		1–4	1–2	0–1	—

Source: CAF
Rules for classification: Group stage tiebreakers
22 November 2025
20:00 UTC+1

RS Berkane (Morocco)	3–0	(Zambia) Power Dynamos
Katebe 13' (o.g.); Chouiar 16'; Bassène 65' (pen.)	Report

Berkane Municipal Stadium, Berkane
Referee: Boubou Traoré (Mali)
22 November 2025
21:00 UTC+2

Pyramids (Egypt)	3–0	(Nigeria) Rivers United
Atef 52', 57', 72'	Report

30 June Stadium, Cairo
Referee: Mahmood Ismail (Sudan)

28 November 2025
17:00 UTC+1

Rivers United (Nigeria)	1–2	(Morocco) RS Berkane
Camara 37' (o.g.)	Report	El Kaabi 90+7'; Chouiar 90+8'

Godswill Akpabio International Stadium, Uyo
Referee: Issa Sy (Senegal)
29 November 2025
18:00 UTC+2

Power Dynamos (Zambia)	0–1	(Egypt) Pyramids
	Report	Reda 51'

Levy Mwanawasa Stadium, Ndola
Referee: Omar Artan (Somalia)

24 January 2026
15:00 UTC+2

Power Dynamos (Zambia)	0–0	(Nigeria) Rivers United
	Report

Levy Mwanawasa Stadium, Ndola
Referee: Lucky Kasalirwe (Uganda)
24 January 2026
20:00 UTC+1

RS Berkane (Morocco)	0–0	(Egypt) Pyramids
	Report

Berkane Municipal Stadium, Berkane
Referee: Yannick Malala (DR Congo)

1 February 2026
17:00 UTC+1

Rivers United (Nigeria)	0–1	(Zambia) Power Dynamos
	Report	Chiboni 50'

Godswill Akpabio International Stadium, Uyo
Referee: Leonidas Barbosa (Cape Verde)
1 February 2026
18:00 UTC+2

Pyramids (Egypt)	3–0	(Morocco) RS Berkane
Zalaka 11'; Maher 74'; Atef 80'	Report

30 June Stadium, Cairo
Referee: Abdel Aziz Bouh (Mauritania)

7 February 2026
15:00 UTC+2

Power Dynamos (Zambia)	2–0	(Morocco) RS Berkane
Manyanga 47'; Mumba 90+2'	Report

Levy Mwanawasa Stadium, Ndola
Referee: Samuel Uwikunda (Rwanda)
8 February 2026
17:00 UTC+1

Rivers United (Nigeria)	1–4	(Egypt) Pyramids
Manyo 33'	Report	Fathi 52'; Ma. Hamdy 77' (pen.); Al-Fakhouri 88'; Maher 90+1'

Godswill Akpabio International Stadium, Uyo
Referee: Mehrez Melki (Tunisia)

14 February 2026
20:00 UTC+1

RS Berkane (Morocco)	3–0	(Nigeria) Rivers United
Mehri 38'; Bassène 43', 53'	Report

Berkane Municipal Stadium, Berkane
Referee: Mutaz Ibrahim (Libya)
14 February 2026
21:00 UTC+2

Pyramids (Egypt)	3–1	(Zambia) Power Dynamos
Ziko 17'; Obama 33'; Ewerton 59'	Report	Mulambia 19'

30 June Stadium, Cairo
Referee: Pierre Atcho (Gabon)

=== Group B ===
Pos	Team	Pld	W	D	L	GF	GA	GD	Pts	Qualification	AHL	ASFAR	YNG	JSK
1	(Egypt) Al Ahly	6	2	4	0	8	3	+5	10	Advance to knockout stage	—	0–0	2–0	4–1
2	(Morocco) AS FAR	6	2	3	1	3	2	+1	9	Advance to knockout stage	1–1	—	1–0	1–0
3	(Tanzania) Young Africans	6	2	2	2	5	4	+1	8		1–1	1–0	—	3–0
4	(Algeria) JS Kabylie	6	0	3	3	1	8	−7	3		0–0	0–0	0–0	—

Source: CAF
Rules for classification: Group stage tiebreakers
22 November 2025
16:00 UTC+3

Young Africans (Tanzania)	1–0	(Morocco) AS FAR
Dube 58'	Report

Amaan Stadium, Zanzibar City (Zanzibar)
Referee: Richard Kokora (Ivory Coast)
22 November 2025
18:00 UTC+2

Al Ahly (Egypt)	4–1	(Algeria) JS Kabylie
Trézéguet 36', 84'; Sherif 39'; Hadid 90+3' (o.g.)	Report	El Shenawy 57' (o.g.)

Cairo International Stadium, Cairo
Referee: Mehrez Melki (Tunisia)

28 November 2025
17:00 UTC+1

JS Kabylie (Algeria)	0–0	(Tanzania) Young Africans
	Report

Hocine Aït Ahmed Stadium, Tizi Ouzou
Referee: Ahmad Heeralall (Mauritius)
28 November 2025
20:00 UTC+1

AS FAR (Morocco)	1–1	(Egypt) Al Ahly
Bouriga 37'	Report	Trézéguet 68'

Moulay El Hassan Stadium, Rabat
Referee: Abdulrazg Ahmed (Libya)

23 January 2026
18:00 UTC+2

Al Ahly (Egypt)	2–0	(Tanzania) Young Africans
Trézéguet 45+3', 75'	Report

Borg El Arab Stadium, Alexandria
Referee: Daouda Gueye (Senegal)
24 January 2026
17:00 UTC+1

JS Kabylie (Algeria)	0–0	(Morocco) AS FAR
	Report

Hocine Aït Ahmed Stadium, Tizi Ouzou
Referee: Abdoul Karim Twagirumukiza (Rwanda)

31 January 2026
16:00 UTC+3

Young Africans (Tanzania)	1–1	(Egypt) Al Ahly
Hamad 45+1'	Report	Dieng 60'

Amaan Stadium, Zanzibar City (Zanzibar)
Referee: Antoine Effa (Cameroon)
31 January 2026
20:00 UTC+1

AS FAR (Morocco)	1–0	(Algeria) JS Kabylie
Khabba 74'	Report

Rabat Olympic Stadium, Rabat
Referee: Hillary Hambaba (Zambia)

7 February 2026
20:00 UTC+1

JS Kabylie (Algeria)	0–0	(Egypt) Al Ahly
	Report

Hocine Aït Ahmed Stadium, Tizi Ouzou
Referee: Brighton Chimene (Zimbabwe)
7 February 2026
20:00 UTC+1

AS FAR (Morocco)	1–0	(Tanzania) Young Africans
Bach 85'	Report

Rabat Olympic Stadium, Rabat
Referee: Abongile Tom (South Africa)

15 February 2026
18:00 UTC+2

Al Ahly (Egypt)	0–0	(Morocco) AS FAR
	Report

Cairo International Stadium, Cairo
Referee: Djindo Houngnandande (Benin)
15 February 2026
19:00 UTC+3

Young Africans (Tanzania)	3–0	(Algeria) JS Kabylie
Depú 36' (pen.), 63'; Boka 66'	Report

Amaan Stadium, Zanzibar City (Zanzibar)
Referee: Jean-Jacques Ndala (DR Congo)

=== Group C ===
Pos	Team	Pld	W	D	L	GF	GA	GD	Pts	Qualification	HIL	MSFC	MCA	FCSEL
1	(Sudan) Al Hilal	6	3	2	1	9	7	+2	11	Advance to knockout stage	—	2–1	2–1	1–0
2	(South Africa) Mamelodi Sundowns	6	2	3	1	9	6	+3	9	Advance to knockout stage	2–2	—	2–0	3–1
3	(Algeria) MC Alger	6	2	1	3	5	6	−1	7		2–1	0–0	—	2–0
4	(Democratic Republic of the Congo) Saint-Éloi Lupopo	6	1	2	3	4	8	−4	5		1–1	1–1	1–0	—

Source: CAF
Rules for classification: Group stage tiebreakers
21 November 2025
15:00 UTC+2

Al Hilal (Sudan)	2–1	(Algeria) MC Alger
Raouf 45+2'; Abdelrahman 75'	Report	Karshoum 53' (o.g.)

Amahoro Stadium, Kigali (Rwanda)
Referee: Charles Bulu (Ghana)
22 November 2025
15:00 UTC+2

Mamelodi Sundowns (South Africa)	3–1	(Democratic Republic of the Congo) Saint-Éloi Lupopo
Santos 5', 77'; Allende 61'	Report	Kashala 44'

Loftus Versfeld Stadium, Pretoria
Referee: Peter Waweru (Kenya)

28 November 2025
20:00 UTC+1

MC Alger (Algeria)	0–0	(South Africa) Mamelodi Sundowns
	Report

Ali La Pointe Stadium, Algiers
Referee: Jean Ouattara (Burkina Faso)
30 November 2025
15:00 UTC+2

Saint-Éloi Lupopo (Democratic Republic of the Congo)	1–1	(Sudan) Al Hilal
Kashala 79'	Report	Raouf 12'

Stade TP Mazembe, Lubumbashi
Referee: Dahane Beida (Mauritania)

23 January 2026
20:00 UTC+2

Mamelodi Sundowns (South Africa)	2–2	(Sudan) Al Hilal
Sales 22'; Mokoena 64'	Report	Raouf 15', 71'

Loftus Versfeld Stadium, Pretoria
Referee: Ousmane Diakité (Mali)
25 January 2026
15:00 UTC+2

Saint-Éloi Lupopo (Democratic Republic of the Congo)	1–0	(Algeria) MC Alger
Kimputu 90+5' (pen.)	Report

Stade TP Mazembe, Lubumbashi
Referee: Joseph Ogabor (Nigeria)

30 January 2026
21:00 UTC+2

Al Hilal (Sudan)	2–1	(South Africa) Mamelodi Sundowns
Abdelrahman 45+3' (pen.); Girumugisha 49'	Report	Sales 61'

Amahoro Stadium, Kigali (Rwanda)
Referee: Mahmoud Nagy (Egypt)
1 February 2026
20:00 UTC+1

MC Alger (Algeria)	2–0	(Democratic Republic of the Congo) Saint-Éloi Lupopo
Khelif 53'; Naidji 82'	Report

Ali La Pointe Stadium, Algiers
Referee: Celso Alvação (Mozambique)

6 February 2026
20:00 UTC+1

MC Alger (Algeria)	2–1	(Sudan) Al Hilal
Anatouf 15'; Ferhat 44'	Report	M'Bracek 77'

Ali La Pointe Stadium, Algiers
Referee: Clément Kpan (Ivory Coast)
8 February 2026
15:00 UTC+2

Saint-Éloi Lupopo (Democratic Republic of the Congo)	1–1	(South Africa) Mamelodi Sundowns
Molia 19'	Report	Adams 55'

Stade TP Mazembe, Lubumbashi
Referee: Peter Waweru (Kenya)

14 February 2026
15:00 UTC+2

Mamelodi Sundowns (South Africa)	2–0	(Algeria) MC Alger
León 6', 63'	Report

Loftus Versfeld Stadium, Pretoria
Referee: Lominson Todihajaniaina (Madagascar)
14 February 2026
15:00 UTC+2

Al Hilal (Sudan)	1–0	(Democratic Republic of the Congo) Saint-Éloi Lupopo
Ebuela 26'	Report

Amahoro Stadium, Kigali (Rwanda)
Referee: Thabang Ketshabile (Botswana)

=== Group D ===
Pos	Team	Pld	W	D	L	GF	GA	GD	Pts	Qualification	SML	EST	APL	SSC
1	(Mali) Stade Malien	6	3	2	1	5	2	+3	11	Advance to knockout stage	—	1–0	2–0	2–1
2	(Tunisia) Espérance de Tunis	6	2	3	1	6	4	+2	9	Advance to knockout stage	0–0	—	2–0	1–0
3	(Angola) Petro de Luanda	6	1	3	2	3	6	−3	6		0–0	1–1	—	1–1
4	(Tanzania) Simba	6	1	2	3	5	7	−2	5		1–0	2–2	0–1	—

Source: CAF
Rules for classification: Group stage tiebreakers
22 November 2025
17:00 UTC+1

Espérance de Tunis (Tunisia)	0–0	(Mali) Stade Malien
	Report

Hammadi Agrebi Stadium, Tunis
Referee: Abongile Tom (South Africa)
23 November 2025
16:00 UTC+3

Simba (Tanzania)	0–1	(Angola) Petro de Luanda
	Report	Benny 78'

Benjamin Mkapa Stadium, Dar es Salaam
Referee: Messie Nkounkou (Congo)

29 November 2025
17:00 UTC+1

Petro de Luanda (Angola)	1–1	(Tunisia) Espérance de Tunis
Reis 49'	Report	Diakité 89'

Estádio 11 de Novembro, Luanda
Referee: Jean-Jacques Ndala (DR Congo)
30 November 2025
16:00 UTC+0

Stade Malien (Mali)	2–1	(Tanzania) Simba
Nkeng 16'; Simpara 23'	Report	Maema 54'

Stade du 26 Mars, Bamako
Referee: Andofetra Rakotojaona (Madagascar)

24 January 2026
17:00 UTC+1

Espérance de Tunis (Tunisia)	1–0	(Tanzania) Simba
Diarra 21'	Report

Hammadi Agrebi Stadium, Tunis
Referee: Jean Pierre Nguiene (Congo)
25 January 2026
16:00 UTC+0

Stade Malien (Mali)	2–0	(Angola) Petro de Luanda
Nkeng 54'; M. Traoré 59'	Report

Stade du 26 Mars, Bamako
Referee: André Kolissala (Central African Republic)

31 January 2026
17:00 UTC+1

Petro de Luanda (Angola)	0–0	(Mali) Stade Malien
	Report

Estádio 11 de Novembro, Luanda
Referee: Richard Kokora (Ivory Coast)
1 February 2026
16:00 UTC+3

Simba (Tanzania)	2–2	(Tunisia) Espérance de Tunis
Kapombe 39'; Kagoma 45'	Report	Diakité 64'; Boualia 79'

Benjamin Mkapa Stadium, Dar es Salaam
Referee: Luxolo Badi (South Africa)

7 February 2026
17:00 UTC+1

Petro de Luanda (Angola)	1–1	(Tanzania) Simba
Pinto 13'	Report	Oura 81'

Estádio 11 de Novembro, Luanda
Referee: Yannick Malala (DR Congo)
8 February 2026
16:00 UTC+0

Stade Malien (Mali)	1–0	(Tunisia) Espérance de Tunis
D. Coulibaly 54'	Report

Stade du 26 Mars, Bamako
Referee: Mustapha Ghorbal (Algeria)

14 February 2026
17:00 UTC+1

Espérance de Tunis (Tunisia)	2–0	(Angola) Petro de Luanda
Diakité 46'; Diarra 81'	Report

Hammadi Agrebi Stadium, Tunis
Referee: Peter Waweru (Kenya)
14 February 2026
19:00 UTC+3

Simba (Tanzania)	1–0	(Mali) Stade Malien
Oura 4'	Report

Benjamin Mkapa Stadium, Dar es Salaam
Referee: Godfrey Nkhakananga (Malawi)

== See also ==
- 2025–26 CAF Confederation Cup group stage
