= 2025–26 CAF Champions League knockout stage =

- Dates: 13 March – 24 May 2026

Tournament statistics
- Matches played: 14
- Goals scored: 27 (1.93 per match)
- Attendance: 401,000 (28,643 per match)

The 2025–26 CAF Champions League knockout stage started on 13 March with the quarter-finals and ended on 24 May 2026 with the second leg of the final to decide the champions of the 2025–26 CAF Champions League. 8 teams competed in the knockout stage.

Times are local.

== Round and draw dates ==
The schedule was as follows.

Round	Draw date	First leg	Second leg
Quarter-finals	17 February 2026	13–14 March 2026	20–21 March 2026
Semi-finals	17 February 2026	10–11 April 2026	17–18 April 2026
Final	17 February 2026	15 May 2026	24 May 2026

== Format ==
Each tie in the knockout phase was played over two legs, with each team playing one leg at home. The team that scored more goals on aggregate over the two legs advanced to the next round. If the aggregate score was level, the away goals rule was applied, i.e. the team that scored more goals away from home over the two legs advanced. If the away goals rule was also equal, then extra time was not played and the winners were decided by a penalty shoot-out (Regulations III. 26 & 27). The mechanism of the draws for each round was as follows:

- In the draw for the quarter-finals, the four group winners were seeded, and the four group runners-up were unseeded. The seeded teams were drawn against the unseeded teams, with the seeded teams hosting the second leg. Teams from the same group could not be drawn against each other, while teams from the same association could be drawn against each other.
- In the draws for the semi-finals, there were no seedings, and teams from the same group or the same association could be drawn against each other. As the draws for the quarter-finals and semi-finals were held together before the quarter-finals were played, the identity of the quarter-final winners was not known at the time of the semi-final draw.

== Qualified teams ==
The knockout stage involved the 8 teams qualifying as winners and runners-up of each of the four groups in the group stage.

Group	Winners	Runners-up
A	(Egypt) Pyramids	(Morocco) RS Berkane
B	(Egypt) Al Ahly	(Morocco) AS FAR
C	(Sudan) Al Hilal	(South Africa) Mamelodi Sundowns
D	(Mali) Stade Malien	(Tunisia) Espérance de Tunis

== Bracket ==
The bracket of the knockout stage was determined as follows:

Round	Matchups
Quarter-finals	(Group winners hosted the second leg, matchups decided by draw, teams from same group cannot play each other): QF1; QF2; QF3; QF4
Semi-finals	(Matchups and order of legs decided by draw, between winners QF1, QF2, QF3, QF4): SF1; SF2
Final	Winners SF1 and SF2 faced each other in two legs to decide the champions

The bracket was decided after the draw for the knockout stage, which was held on 17 February 2026, 12:00 GMT (12:00 local time, UTC+2), at the Egyptian Football Association headquarters in Cairo, Egypt.

Quarter-finals
(Tunisia) Espérance de Tunis	1	3	4
(Egypt) Al Ahly	0	2	2
(South Africa) Mamelodi Sundowns	3	0	3
(Mali) Stade Malien	0	2	2
(Morocco) AS FAR	1	2	3
(Egypt) Pyramids	1	1	2
(Morocco) RS Berkane	1	1	2
(Sudan) Al Hilal	1	0	1

Semi-finals
(Tunisia) Espérance de Tunis	0	0	0
(South Africa) Mamelodi Sundowns	1	1	2
(Morocco) AS FAR	2	0	2
(Morocco) RS Berkane	0	1	1

Final
(South Africa) Mamelodi Sundowns	1	1	2
(Morocco) AS FAR	0	1	1

== Quarter-finals ==
The draw for the quarter-finals was held on 17 February 2026.

=== Summary ===
The first legs were played on 13, 14, and 15 March, and the second legs were played on 21 and 22 March 2026.

Team 1	Agg.	Team 2	1st leg	2nd leg
RS Berkane (Morocco)	2–1	(Sudan) Al Hilal	1–1	1–0
Espérance de Tunis (Tunisia)	4–2	(Egypt) Al Ahly	1–0	3–2
Mamelodi Sundowns (South Africa)	3–2	(Mali) Stade Malien	3–0	0–2
AS FAR (Morocco)	3–2	(Egypt) Pyramids	1–1	2–1

=== Matches ===
14 March 2026
22:00 UTC+0

RS Berkane (Morocco)	1–1	(Sudan) Al Hilal
Chouiar 90+10' (pen.)	Report	Raouf 13'

Berkane Municipal Stadium, Berkane
Attendance: 8,000
Referee: Abongile Tom (South Africa)
22 March 2026
18:00 UTC+2

Al Hilal (Sudan)	0–1	(Morocco) RS Berkane
	Report	Chouiar 90+3'

Amahoro Stadium, Kigali (Rwanda)
Attendance: 20,000
Referee: Abdou Mefire (Cameroon)

RS Berkane won 2–1 on aggregate.

15 March 2026
22:00 UTC+1

Espérance de Tunis (Tunisia)	1–0	(Egypt) Al Ahly
Tougai 73' (pen.)	Report

Hammadi Agrebi Stadium, Tunis
Attendance: 50,000
Referee: Issa Sy (Senegal)
21 March 2026
21:00 UTC+2

Al Ahly (Egypt)	2–3	(Tunisia) Espérance de Tunis
Trézéguet 10'; Jelassi 84' (o.g.)	Report	Danho 68'; Tougai 78' (pen.); Jelassi 90+4'

Cairo International Stadium, Cairo
Attendance: 0 (close doors)
Referee: Jalal Jayed (Morocco)

Espérance de Tunis won 4–2 on aggregate.

13 March 2026
20:00 UTC+2

Mamelodi Sundowns (South Africa)	3–0	(Mali) Stade Malien
Mudau 34'; León 55'; Rayners 74'	Report

Loftus Versfeld Stadium, Pretoria
Attendance: 40,000
Referee: Pierre Atcho (Gabon)
22 March 2026
16:00 UTC+0

Stade Malien (Mali)	2–0	(South Africa) Mamelodi Sundowns
Nkeng 1'; Mandjan 40'	Report

Stade du 26 Mars, Bamako
Attendance: 5,000
Referee: Mehrez Melki (Tunisia)

Mamelodi Sundowns won 3–2 on aggregate.

13 March 2026
22:00 UTC+0

AS FAR (Morocco)	1–1	(Egypt) Pyramids
Hammoudan 8'	Report	Zalaka 52'

Rabat Olympic Stadium, Rabat
Attendance: 0 (close doors)
Referee: Omar Artan (Somalia)
21 March 2026
18:00 UTC+2

Pyramids (Egypt)	1–2	(Morocco) AS FAR
Mayele 62'	Report	Slim 9'; Hrimat 54'

30 June Stadium, Cairo
Attendance: 2,000
Referee: Dahane Beida (Mauritania)

AS FAR won 3–2 on aggregate.

== Semi-finals ==
The draw for the semi-finals was held on 17 February 2026 (after the quarter-finals draw).

=== Summary ===
The first legs were played on 11 and 12 April, and the second legs were played on 18 April 2026.

Team 1	Agg.	Team 2	1st leg	2nd leg
Espérance de Tunis (Tunisia)	0–2	(South Africa) Mamelodi Sundowns	0–1	0–1
AS FAR (Morocco)	2–1	(Morocco) RS Berkane	2–0	0–1

=== Matches ===
12 April 2026
20:00 UTC+1

Espérance de Tunis (Tunisia)	0–1	(South Africa) Mamelodi Sundowns
	Report	León 51'

Hammadi Agrebi Stadium, Tunis
Attendance: 50,000
Referee: Mustapha Ghorbal (Algeria)
18 April 2026
15:00 UTC+2

Mamelodi Sundowns (South Africa)	1–0	(Tunisia) Espérance de Tunis
León 35'	Report

Loftus Versfeld Stadium, Pretoria
Attendance: 45,000
Referee: Omar Artan (Somalia)

Mamelodi Sundowns won 2–0 on aggregate.

11 April 2026
20:00 UTC+1

AS FAR (Morocco)	2–0	(Morocco) RS Berkane
Hammoudan 58'; Ait Ouarkhane 80'	Report

Prince Moulay Abdellah Stadium, Rabat
Attendance: 60,000
Referee: Dahane Beida (Mauritania)
18 April 2026
20:00 UTC+1

RS Berkane (Morocco)	1–0	(Morocco) AS FAR
Labhiri 57' (pen.)	Report

Berkane Municipal Stadium, Berkane
Attendance: 10,000
Referee: Pierre Atcho (Gabon)

AS FAR won 2–1 on aggregate.

== Final ==
The first leg was played on 17 May, and the second leg was played on 24 May 2026.

Team 1	Agg.	Team 2	1st leg	2nd leg
Mamelodi Sundowns (South Africa)	2–1	(Morocco) AS FAR	1–0	1–1

17 May 2026
16:00 UTC+2

Mamelodi Sundowns (South Africa)	1–0	(Morocco) AS FAR
Modiba 37'	Report

Loftus Versfeld Stadium, Pretoria
Attendance: 51,000
Referee: Jean-Jacques Ndala (DR Congo)
24 May 2026
20:00 UTC+1

AS FAR (Morocco)	1–1	(South Africa) Mamelodi Sundowns
Hrimat 40' (pen.)	Report	Mokoena 45+7'

Prince Moulay Abdellah Stadium, Rabat
Attendance: 60,000
Referee: Omar Artan (Somalia)

Mamelodi Sundowns won 2–1 on aggregate.

== See also ==
- 2025–26 CAF Confederation Cup knockout stage
