= 2024–25 AS FAR season =

AS FAR
2024–25 season
- Manager: Czesław Michniewicz
- Stadium: Prince Moulay Abdellah Stadium
- Botola: Pre-season
- Throne Cup: Pre-season
- CAF Champions League: Quarter-finals
- Top goalscorer: League: All: Joël Beya (2)
- Biggest win: AS FAR 2–0 Remo Stars

The 2024–25 season is the 66th season in the history of AS FAR and the 16th consecutive season in the Moroccan Premier League. In addition to the domestic league, the Throne Cup and the CAF Champions League.

== Competitions ==
=== Overall record ===
Competition	First match	Last match	Starting round	Record							
Competition	First match	Last match	Starting round	Pld	W	D	L	GF	GA	GD	Win %
Botola	30–31 August 2024		Matchday 1	26	13	9	4	40	21	+19	50.00
Throne Cup				0	0	0	0	0	0	+0	—
Excellence Cup	3 September 2024			2	1	0	1	3	2	+1	50.00
CAF Champions League	18 August 2024		First round	3	1	1	1	5	4	+1	33.33
Total				31	15	10	6	48	27	+21	48.39

Last updated: 14 September 2024
Source: Soccerway

=== Botola ===
==== League table ====
Pos	Team	Pld	W	D	L	GF	GA	GD	Pts	Qualification or relegation
1	RS Berkane (C)	30	21	7	2	49	14	+35	70	Qualification for Champions League
2	AS FAR	30	16	9	5	48	24	+24	57	Qualification for Champions League
3	Wydad AC	30	14	12	4	45	27	+18	54	Qualification for Confederation Cup
4	FUS Rabat	30	14	8	8	53	26	+27	50	
5	Raja CA	30	12	12	6	38	25	+13	48	

Source: FRMF.ma
Rules for classification: 1) Points; 2a) Head-to-head goal difference if they are two teams with equal points; 2b) Goal difference if they are more than two teams with equal points; 3) Number of wins; 4) Goals scored; 5) Play-off between involved teams.
(C) Champions

==== Results summary ====
Overall								Home						Away					
Pld	W	D	L	GF	GA	GD	Pts	W	D	L	GF	GA	GD	W	D	L	GF	GA	GD
26	13	9	4	40	21	+19	48	8	5	0	22	9	+13	5	4	4	18	12	+6

Last updated: 14 April 2025.

==== Results by round ====
Round	1
Ground	A
Result	W
Position	

Updated to match(es) played on 30 August 2024. Source:
A = Away; H = Home; W = Win; D = Draw; L = Loss

==== Matches ====
The match schedule was released on 9 August 2024.

30 August 2024 1	SCC Mohammédia	0–5	AS FAR	Mohammedia
19:00 UTC+1		Report	Beya 31'; Hrimat 48', 64', 84'; Zouzouh 88'	Stadium: El Bachir Stadium

25 September 2024 2	AS FAR	4–0	COD Meknès	Kenitra
21:00	El Fahli 27'; Zakaria Ajoughlal 34'; Amine Zouhzouh 43'; Anas Bach 56'	Report	Mohamed El Jaaouani (yellow card) 8'; Oussama Daoui (yellow card) 46'; Mouad Fekkak (yellow card) 65'; Mouhcine Rabja (yellow card) 79'	Stadium: Kenitra Municipal Stadium; Referee: (Morocco) N Nachit

29 September 2024 4	AS FAR	1–1	RS Berkane	Kenitra
19:00	Tó Carneiro 19'; Hrimat (yellow card) 45'	Report	Ayoub Khairi (yellow card) 3'; Youssef Mehri (yellow card) 48'; Mateus Santos 53'	Stadium: Kenitra Municipal Stadium; Referee: (Morocco) K Sabry

2 October 2024 3	Difaâ El Jadidi	1–0	AS FAR	El Jadida
17:00	Omar Jerrari (yellow card) 19'; Khalid Baba 30'; Majji (yellow card) 36'; Adil El Hassnaoui (yellow card) 42'; Yassine Fatine (yellow card) 64'; Mnawa Emmanuel Kpatai (yellow card) 90+5'	Report	Hrimat (yellow card) 58'; Tó Carneiro (yellow card) 76'	Stadium: Ben M'Hamed El Abdi Stadium; Referee: (Morocco) S El Atifi

6 October 2024 5	IR Tanger	1–1	AS FAR	Tétouan
18:00 UTC+1	El Harrak 4'	Report	Bach 82'	Stadium: Saniat Rmel Stadium; Attendance: 0 Referee: Zouhair Kadim
Note: Due to Ibn Battuta Stadium renovation, the team hosted its match at Saniat Rmel Stadium.

22 October 2024 7	Raja CA	0–0	AS FAR	Casablanca
20:00		Report		Stadium: Stade Larbi Zaouli; Attendance: 15000; Referee: Hicham Tamsamani

19 December 2024 13	AS FAR	2–2	Wydad AC	Kenitra
18:00 UTC+1	Hrimat 4'; El Fahli 49'	Report	Zemraoui 14'; Rayhi 18'	Stadium: Kenitra Municipal Stadium; Referee: Achraf Berrada

8 February 2025 20	AS FAR	3–2	IR Tanger	Kenitra
18:00 UTC+1	El Fahli 45+1', 49'; Hrimat 90+7' (pen.)	Report	El Wasti 64'; Moutaouali 84'	Stadium: Kenitra Municipal Stadium; Referee: Said Boujidi

23 February 2025 22	AS FAR	0–0	Raja CA	Kenitra
18:00		Report		Stadium: Kenitra Municipal Stadium; Attendance: 10000; Referee: Mohsine Sourdy

=== CAF Champions League ===
==== First round ====
The draw was made on 11 July 2024.

18 August 2024 First leg	Remo Stars (Nigeria)	2–1	(Morocco) AS FAR	Ikenne, Nigeria
16:00 UTC+1	Junior 19'; Sodiq 68'		Beya 50'	Stadium: Remo Stars Stadium

25 August 2024 Second leg	AS FAR (Morocco)	2–0 (3–2 agg.)	(Nigeria) Remo Stars	Rabat
21:00 UTC+1	Beya 53'; Zouhzouh 80' (pen.)			Stadium: Prince Moulay Abdellah Stadium

==== Second round ====
14 September 2024 First leg	Al-Merrikh (Sudan)	2–2	(Morocco) AS FAR	Juba, South Sudan
15:00 UTC+2

22 September 2024 Second leg	AS FAR (Morocco)	2–0 (4–2 agg.)	(Sudan) Al-Merrikh	Rabat
				Stadium: Prince Moulay Abdellah Stadium

==== Group stage ====
The group stage draw was held on 7 October 2024.

Pos	Team	Pld	W	D	L	GF	GA	GD	Pts	Qualification	FAR	MSFC	RCA	MUN
1	(Morocco) AS FAR	6	2	4	0	8	4	+4	10	Advance to knockout stage	—	1–1	1–1	2–0
2	(South Africa) Mamelodi Sundowns	6	2	3	1	5	4	+1	9	Advance to knockout stage	1–1	—	1–0	0–0
3	(Morocco) Raja CA	6	2	2	2	4	5	−1	8		0–2	1–0	—	1–0
4	(Democratic Republic of the Congo) AS Maniema Union	6	0	3	3	3	7	−4	3		1–1	1–2	1–1	—

Source: CAF
Rules for classification: Group stage tiebreakers

26 November 2024 1	Raja CA (Morocco)	0–2	(Morocco) AS FAR	Casablanca
20:00 UTC+1		Report	Hammoudan 41'; Aït Ouarkhane 90+7'	Stadium: Larbi Zaouli Stadium (Note: Raja CA played their home matches at Larbi Zaouli Stadium, instead of their regular stadium, Stade Mohammed V, both located in Casablanca, due to renovation works.); Referee: Issa Sy (Senegal)

7 December 2024 2	AS FAR (Morocco)	1–1	(South Africa) Mamelodi Sundowns	El Jadida
20:00 UTC+1	Hrimat 74'	Report	Rayners 66'	Stadium: Ben M'Hamed El Abdi Stadium (Note: AS FAR played their home matches at Ben M'Hamed El Abdi Stadium, El Jadida and Honneur Stadium, Meknes, instead of their regular stadium, Prince Moulay Abdellah Stadium, Rabat, due to renovation works.); Referee: Dahane Beida (Mauritania)

14 December 2024 3	AS Maniema Union (Democratic Republic of the Congo)	1–1	(Morocco) AS FAR	Kinshasa
14:00 UTC+1	Moanda 37'	Report	Carneiro 62'	Stadium: Stade des Martyrs (Note: AS Maniema Union played their home matches at Stade des Martyrs, Kinshasa, instead of their regular stadium, Stade Joseph Kabila Kabange, Kindu, which did not meet CAF requirements.); Referee: Omar Artan (Somalia)

4 January 2025 4	AS FAR (Morocco)	2–0	(Democratic Republic of the Congo) AS Maniema Union	Meknes
20:00 UTC+1	Aït Ouarkhane 12'; Zouhzouh 45+3'	Report		Stadium: Honneur Stadium; Referee: Georges Gatogato (Burundi)

11 January 2025 5	AS FAR (Morocco)	1–1	(Morocco) Raja CA	Meknes
20:00 UTC+1	Zniti 40' (o.g.)	Report	Zerhouni 77' (pen.)	Stadium: Honneur Stadium; Referee: Mohamed Maarouf (Egypt)

19 January 2025 6	Mamelodi Sundowns (South Africa)	1–1	(Morocco) AS FAR	Pretoria
18:00 UTC+2	Shalulile 12'	Report	Zouhzouh 83'	Stadium: Loftus Versfeld Stadium; Referee: Peter Waweru (Kenya)

==== Quarter-finals ====
1 April 2025 First leg	Pyramids (Egypt)	4–1	(Morocco) AS FAR	Cairo
21:00 UTC+2	Mayele 2', 12'; Adel 38', 67'	Report	Hadraf 45'	Stadium: 30 June Stadium; Attendance: 2,000; Referee: Omar Artan (Somalia)

8 April 2025 Second leg	AS FAR (Morocco)	2–0 (3–4 agg.)	(Egypt) Pyramids	Meknes
20:00 UTC+1	El Fahli 8'; Beya 82'	Report		Stadium: Honneur Stadium; Attendance: 12,000; Referee: Ibrahim Mutaz (Libya)
