= Alexandre Santos (football manager) =

Portuguese football manager (born 1976)

Personal information
- Full name: Alexandre Crispim dos Santos
- Date of birth: 18 November 1976 (age 49)
- Place of birth: Lisbon, Portugal

Team information
- Current team: Petro Luanda (manager)

Managerial career
- Years: Team
- 2002–2005: Alverca U19
- 2006–2008: Estrela Amadora (assistant)
- 2008–2009: Vitória Setúbal (assistant)
- 2010–2011: Saudi Arabia (assistant)
- 2012–2013: Braga (assistant)
- 2013–2015: Al Wahda (assistant)
- 2015–2016: Al Ahly (assistant)
- 2016: Porto (assistant)
- 2016: Braga (assistant)
- 2017: Sharjah (assistant)
- 2018: Real Massamá
- 2018: Estoril U23
- 2018–2019: Sporting CP U23
- 2019: Caen (assistant)
- 2020–2021: Alverca
- 2021–2024: Petro Luanda
- 2024: Sfaxien
- 2025–2026: AS FAR
- 2026: Kuwait SC
- 2026: Nacional
- 2026–: Petro Luanda

Alexandre Crispim dos Santos (born 18 November 1976) is a Portuguese football manager who is currently in charge of Girabola club Atlético Petróleos de Luanda.

He spent several years as assistant to José Peseiro at clubs such as Braga, Porto and various teams in the Arab world. In 2021, he was appointed at Petro de Luanda, where he won the Girabola and Taça de Angola double in each of his three seasons. With AS FAR of Morocco, he reached the 2026 CAF Champions League final.

== Career ==
=== Early career and assistant to José Peseiro ===
Santos was born in Lisbon as the son of two workers of a foundry in Vila Franca de Xira, and grew up in Alhandra, a parish of the latter city. His father later got a job in sports with the city council, inspiring Santos to become a physical education teacher.

Santos managed F.C. Alverca's under-19 team from 2002 to 2005. He then worked as a fitness coach at G.D. Estoril Praia in the following season, and became an assistant to Daúto Faquirá at C.F. Estrela da Amadora and Vitória de Setúbal.

In August 2010, compatriot manager José Peseiro named Santos as assistant on the Saudi Arabia national team. He spent most of the 2010s as Peseiro's assistant at home and in the Middle East, with roles at S.C. Braga, Al Wahda FC, Al Ahly SC, FC Porto, Braga again, and Sharjah FC.

=== Return to Portugal ===
On 22 January 2018, 41-year-old Santos was given his first job as a senior head coach, at Real S.C. who were in last place in Portugal's second tier. For the following season, he returned to Estoril as under-23 manager; with the team in 4th place, he moved to the same role at 6th-placed Sporting CP on 13 December 2018, succeeding Tiago Fernandes.

In June 2019, Santos went back to assistant roles abroad, signing for French Ligue 2 club SM Caen under Portuguese manager Rui Almeida. The staff were sacked nine games into the season. On 29 December, he went back to head coach roles in his country, returning to Alverca. He resigned on 1 February 2021, with the team second-placed in their group in the Campeonato de Portugal.

=== Africa and Kuwait ===
On 23 August 2021, Santos was appointed at Atlético Petróleos de Luanda in the Angolan Girabola. His team won a double of league and Taça de Angola in each of his three seasons.

At the end of June 2024, Santos agreed to become the new manager of CS Sfaxien in the Tunisian Ligue Professionnelle 1. He left the following 6 January, having lost his last six games, with the team 9th in the domestic league and without a point in the CAF Confederation Cup.

Remaining in North Africa, Santos signed for Morocco's AS FAR on 9 February 2025, succeeding Hubert Velud at a club ranked second in the Botola Pro and awaiting the quarter-finals of the CAF Champions League. In the 2026 CAF Champions League final, his team lost 2–1 on aggregate to South Africa's Mamelodi Sundowns, managed by compatriot Miguel Cardoso.

Santos left for Kuwait SC in July 2026. His spell ended by mutual consent six weeks later, and before taking charge of any competitive fixtures.

=== Debut in Primeira Liga ===
On 7 September 2026, Santos was hired by C.D. Nacional until the end of the 2026–27 season for his first manager job in his home country's top tier. His debut five days later was a 3–1 home loss to Alverca, who scored all their goals over eight first-half minutes, and only lasted three further matches – all defeats – before his dismissal on 20 October.

Immediately after his exit from Nacional, Santos returned to Petro Luanda. In his first game back, his team overturned a 2–0 deficit against Scottland of Zimbabwe to qualify for the group phase of the African Champions League.

== Honours ==
Petro Luanda

- Girabola: 2021–22, 2022–23, 2023–24
- Taça de Angola: 2021–22, 2022–23, 2023–24
- Supertaça de Angola: 2023

AS FAR

- Botola Pro runner-up: 2024–25
- CAF Champions League runner-up: 2025–26
