= Jayden Adams =

South African soccer player (2001–2026)

- Adams' official headshot from the 2026 FIFA World Cup

Personal information
- Full name: Jayden Oswin Adams
- Date of birth: 5 May 2001
- Place of birth: Cape Town, South Africa
- Date of death: c. 11 July 2026 (aged 25)
- Place of death: Schotsche Kloof, Cape Town, South Africa
- Height: 1.75 m (5 ft 9 in)
- Position: Defensive midfielder

Youth career
- –2020: Stellenbosch

Senior career*
Years	Team	Apps	(Gls)
2020–2025	Stellenbosch	109	(7)
2025–2026	Mamelodi Sundowns	40	(4)
Total		149	(11)

International career
2022	South Africa B		
2022–2026	South Africa	13	(2)
Medal record
Men's football
Representing South Africa
Africa Cup of Nations
Third place	2023 Ivory Coast
- * Club domestic league appearances and goals

Jayden Oswin Adams (5 May 2001 – c. 11 July 2026) was a South African professional soccer player who played as a defensive midfielder. He played for Stellenbosch, Mamelodi Sundowns, and the South African national team.

== Early life ==
Jayden Oswin Adams was born in Cape Town on 5 May 2001 to Candice and Juanito Adams and grew up in Cloetesville, a poor suburb of Stellenbosch, South Africa.

== Career ==
Adams played as a defensive midfielder and also as a winger.

=== Club ===
Adams came through the academy of Stellenbosch and signed a long-term contract in August 2020, becoming the club's first academy graduate to sign a contract professionally. He made his senior debut later that month as a substitute in a 1–1 draw at home against Chippa United on 28 August. In six seasons with the club, Adams tallied 109 appearances and scored seven times.

Adams with Stellenbosch

In January 2025, Adams joined Mamelodi Sundowns, where he won the South African Premiership in his first season with the club. In May 2026, Mamelodi won the 2026 CAF Champions League. In his two seasons with the team, Adams appeared in 67 games.

=== International career ===
Adams's international career started with the South Africa B team in a game against Mozambique in the 2022 COSAFA Cup. He scored his first international goal in the 2026 FIFA World Cup qualifier against Lesotho. He was named to the South Africa squad for the 2026 FIFA World Cup. He featured in all of his team's group-stage matches in Group A during the tournament. He started in the game against Mexico in Mexico City on 11 June, which ended in a 2–0 loss, and against the Czech Republic on 18 June, which ended in a 1–1 draw. He came in as a substitute on 24 June, when Bafana Bafana beat South Korea 1–0 in Monterrey, in what would be the final match in his football career. He did not appear during the 0–1 loss to Canada in the round of 32. Adams scored two goals in 13 games for South Africa throughout his international career.

== Personal life and death ==
Adams's close friend and former teammate Oshwin Andries was stabbed to death in 2023, and Adams dedicated his Sundowns medal to Andries. His grandmother, Marianna Adams, died on 17 June 2026, the day before South Africa's World Cup encounter with Czech Republic.

Adams was found dead in Schotsche Kloof, Cape Town, on 11 July 2026, aged 25, from undisclosed causes. His death was confirmed by his representatives and guardian, with family spokesperson Brendine Johnson requesting privacy on behalf of the family. On 13 July, Cape Town central police launched an investigation into Adams's death.

Adams and his partner, Aqueelah Adendorf, had a daughter who was aged five at the time of his death. Adams also had a son with Jody Solomons, Jude Sage, who was born in August 2024.

FIFA held a moment of silence in Adams's honour during the 2026 FIFA World Cup quarterfinals with Norway vs. England and Argentina vs. Switzerland on 11 July.

== Career statistics ==
=== Club ===
Appearances and goals by club, season and competition
Club	Season	League			Nedbank Cup		Knockout Cup		Continental		Other		Total	
Club	Season	Division	Apps	Goals	Apps	Goals	Apps	Goals	Apps	Goals	Apps	Goals	Apps	Goals
Stellenbosch FC	2019–20	South African Premiership	2	0	0	0	—		—		—		2	0
Stellenbosch FC	2020–21	South African Premiership	21	0	1	0	—		—		—		22	0
Stellenbosch FC	2021–22	South African Premiership	25	2	1	0	—		—		—		26	2
Stellenbosch FC	2022–23	South African Premiership	28	1	3	0	0	0	—		1 (Note: Appearance(s) in MTN 8)	0	32	1
Stellenbosch FC	2023–24	South African Premiership	25	3	3	0	4	0	—		3	0	35	3
Stellenbosch FC	2024–25	South African Premiership	8	1	0	0	1	0	9 (Note: Appearances in CAF Confederation Cup)	1	4	1	13	2
Stellenbosch FC	Total		109	7	8	0	5	0	9	1	8	1	139	9
Mamelodi Sundowns	2024–25	South African Premiership	17	3	3	1	0	0	6 (Note: Appearances in CAF Champions League)	0	6 (Note: Three appearances in MTN 8, three appearances in FIFA Club World Cup)	0	32	4
Mamelodi Sundowns	2025–26	South African Premiership	23	1	1	0	0	0	9	1	0	0	33	2
Mamelodi Sundowns	Total		40	4	4	1	0	0	15	1	6	0	65	6
Career total			149	11	12	1	5	0	24	2	14	1	204	15

=== International ===
Appearances and goals by national team and year
National team	Year	Apps	Goals
South Africa	2022	3	0
South Africa	2024	2	0
South Africa	2025	2	2
South Africa	2026	6	0
Total		13	2

Scores and results list South Africa's goal tally first, score column indicates score after each Adams goal.

List of international goals scored by Jayden Adams
No.	Date	Venue	Opponent	Score	Result	Competition
1	21 March 2025	Peter Mokaba Stadium, Polokwane, South Africa	Lesotho	2–0	2–0	2026 FIFA World Cup qualification
2	25 March 2025	Felix Houphouet Boigny Stadium, Abidjan, Ivory Coast	Benin	2–0	2–0	2026 FIFA World Cup qualification

== Honours ==
Stellenbosch FC

- Carling Knockout Cup: 2023

Mamelodi Sundowns

- CAF Champions League: 2025–26
- South African Premiership: 2024–25

South Africa

- Africa Cup of Nations third place: 2023
