= Khulumani Ndamane =

South African soccer player (born 2004)

Personal information
- Date of birth: 5 February 2004 (age 22)
- Place of birth: Sahlumbe, South Africa
- Height: 1.83 m (6 ft 0 in)
- Position: Centre-back

Team information
- Current team: Mamelodi Sundowns
- Number: 3

Youth career
- 2023: Kaizer Chiefs Development

Senior career*
Years	Team	Apps	(Gls)
2024–2025	TS Galaxy	37	(0)
2026–	Mamelodi Sundowns	0	(0)

International career^{‡}
2025–	South Africa	4	(0)
- * Club domestic league appearances and goals as of 7 December 2025 ‡ National team caps and goals as of 15 November 2025

Khulumani Ndamane (born 5 February 2004) is a South African soccer player who plays as a central defender for South African Premiership side Mamelodi Sundowns and the South Africa national team.

== Club career ==
=== Kaizer Chiefs Academy ===
Ndamane joined the Kaizer Chiefs Academy in 2023 and played in the PSL Reserve League.

=== TS Galaxy ===
In June 2024, he signed with South African Premiership side TS Galaxy. Ndamane has made 27 appearances for the club in the 2024–25 season.

=== Mamelodi Sundowns ===
He joined Mamelodi Sundowns during the January 2026 transfer window.

== International career ==
In June 2025, Ndamane received his first senior international call-up for two friendly games against Tanzania and Mozambique, making his debut in a 0–0 draw against Tanzania. He was called up again for the World Cup qualifiers against Lesotho and Nigeria in September 2025.

On 1 December 2025, Ndamane was called up to the South Africa squad for the 2025 Africa Cup of Nations.

On 28 May 2026, he was selected by manager Hugo Broos to represent his nation at the 2026 FIFA World Cup.

== Personal life ==
Ndamane grew up in Sahlumbe, KwaZulu-Natal. He is a supporter of Kaizer Chiefs.

== Honours ==
Mamelodi Sundowns

- MTN 8: 2026
- CAF Champions League: 2025–26
- FIFA African–Asian–Pacific Cup: 2026
