= Fundación Bata =

Association football club in Equatorial Guinea

- Ground: Estadio de Bata
- League: Equatoguinean Primera División
- 2024–25: Champions
- Website: www.fundacionbata.com

Fundación Bata are an association football club from Equatorial Guinea. They won the Equatoguinean Primera División in 2024–25, which qualified them for the 2025–26 CAF Champions League. They play their home games at the Estadio de Bata.

== See also ==
- Football in Equatorial Guinea
