= Lebone Seema =

South African footballer (born 2003)

- An edited photo of Seema with Orlando Pirates

Personal information
- Date of birth: 5 April 2003 (age 23)
- Place of birth: South Africa
- Height: 1.80 m (5 ft 11 in)
- Position: Centre-back

Team information
- Current team: Orlando Pirates
- Number: 6

Youth career
- TS Galaxy

Senior career*
Years	Team	Apps	(Gls)
2022–2025	TS Galaxy	22	(0)
2025–	Orlando Pirates	34	(4)

International career
2026–	South Africa	2	(0)
- * Club domestic league appearances and goals

Lebone Seema (born 5 April 2003) is a South African professional soccer player who plays as a centre-back for South African Premiership club Orlando Pirates and the South Africa national team.

== Early life ==
Seema was born on 5 April 2003. He was born into a footballing family in Rheinland Village, also known as Shakoleng, about 75 km north west of Polokwane in Limpopo. His father Matome ‘Sisco’ Seema played as a midfielder for local club Hungry Tigers FC.

== Club career ==
=== TS Galaxy ===
Seema represented TS Galaxy in the DStv Diski Challenge prior to his promotion to the first team in the 2022/23 season. He made over 20 senior appearances before parting ways with the Mpumalanga outfit.

=== Orlando Pirates ===
The talented centre-back joined Pirates in the lead-up to the 2025/26 season. At the Buccaneers, Seema made an immediate impact as he quickly commanded a starting berth, chipping in with crucial goals that proved valuable in the team's title chase. He was duly awarded the Betway Premiership's Defender of the Season accolade, capping an impressive breakthrough campaign.

Seema was part of the defensive line that kept clean sheets in two domestic cup finals in the 2025/26 season.

== International career ==
On 30 September 2026, Seema made his international debut for the South Africa national team in a 5–0 win against Eritrea.
