= Tiago Reis =

Brazilian footballer

Personal information
- Full name: Tiago Rodrigues dos Reis
- Date of birth: 14 August 1999 (age 27)
- Place of birth: Brasília, Brazil
- Height: 1.84 m (6 ft 0 in)
- Position: Striker

Team information
- Current team: Petro de Luanda
- Number: 23

Youth career
- 2015–2017: Goiás
- 2017–2018: Cruzeiro
- 2018–2019: Vasco da Gama

Senior career*
Years	Team	Apps	(Gls)
2019–2022	Vasco da Gama	41	(8)
2021	→ Confiança (loan)	18	(2)
2022	→ Botafogo-SP (loan)	28	(5)
2023	Botafogo-PB	9	(1)
2023–2024	Mesaimeer	13	(9)
2024–2025	Nacional	7	(0)
2025	Chaves	12	(6)
2025–	Petro de Luanda	34	(21)
- * Club domestic league appearances and goals as of 26 April 2026

Tiago Rodrigues dos Reis (born 14 August 1999), known as Tiago Reis, is a Brazilian football player who plays as a striker for Angolan club Petro de Luanda.

== Club career ==
Born in Brasília, Federal District, Tiago Reis joined Goiás' youth setup in 2015, after impressing on a trial. In 2017 he moved to Cruzeiro, but was released in the following year.

On 6 August 2018, Tiago Reis joined Vasco da Gama, being initially assigned to the under-20 squad. Promoted to the main squad after impressing in the 2019 Copa São Paulo de Futebol Júnior, he made his first team debut on 2 March by coming on as a second-half substitute for fellow youth graduate Marrony in a 2–0 Campeonato Carioca home win against Boavista.

Tiago Reis scored his first senior goal on 20 March 2019, netting the opener in a 2–0 away defeat of Resende.

== Career statistics ==
As of 23 May 2024

Club	Season	League			Cup		Continental		Other		Total	
Club	Season	Division	Apps	Goals	Apps	Goals	Apps	Goals	Apps	Goals	Apps	Goals
Vasco da Gama	2019	Série A	11	1	1	0	—		8 (Note: Appearance(s) in Campeonato Carioca.)	4	19	5
Vasco da Gama	2020	Série A	8	0	1	0	3 (Note: Appearance(s) in Copa Sudamericana.)	1	5	0	16	1
Vasco da Gama	2021	Série B	0	0	1	0	0	0	9	3	10	3
Confiança	2021	Série B	18	2	0	0	—		—		18	2
Botafogo (SP)	2022	Série C	14	4	1	0	9 (Note: Appearance(s) in Copa Paulista.)	2	14 (Note: Appearance(s) in Campeonato Paulista.)	1	38	7
Botafogo (PB)	2023	Série C	9	1	1	0	—		10 (Note: Appearance(s) in Campeonato Paraibano.)	2	20	3
Mesaimeer	2023–24	QSD	14	10	0	0	0	0	0	0	14	10
Career total			74	18	3	0	12	3	46	10	137	31

== Honours ==
Individual

- Campeonato Carioca Revelation of the Year: 2019
