= Arthur Sales (footballer, born 2002) =

Brazilian footballer (born 2002)

Personal information
- Full name: Arthur de Oliveira Sales
- Date of birth: 3 July 2002 (age 24)
- Place of birth: São Gabriel da Palha, Brazil
- Height: 1.84 m (6 ft 0 in)
- Position: Forward

Team information
- Current team: Mamelodi Sundowns
- Number: 9

Youth career
- 2016–2021: Vasco da Gama

Senior career*
Years	Team	Apps	(Gls)
2021	Vasco da Gama	9	(0)
2021–2024	Lommel	38	(17)
2022–2023	→ Paços de Ferreira (loan)	12	(0)
2023–2024	→ Bahia (loan)	9	(1)
2024–	Mamelodi Sundowns	31	(11)
- * Club domestic league appearances and goals as of 14 March 2026

Arthur de Oliveira Sales (born 3 July 2002) is a Brazilian professional footballer who plays as a forward for the South African club Mamelodi Sundowns.

== Club career ==
=== Earlier career ===
On 31 August 2021, Sales joined Belgian First Division B side Lommel on a five-year deal. In July 2022, he joined Primeira Liga side Paços de Ferreira on a season-long loan deal.

On 9 March 2023, Arthur Sales returned to his home country after being loaned to Bahia until the end of the year.

=== Mamelodi Sundowns ===
Sales joined Premier Soccer League side Mamelodi Sundowns in July 2024, for a reported club record transfer fee of €3.2 million.

== Honours ==
Mamelodi Sundowns

- South African Premiership: 2024–25
- CAF Champions League: 2025–26
