= Taddeus Nkeng =

Cameroonian footballer

Personal information
- Full name: Taddeus Nkeng Fomakwang
- Date of birth: 26 February 2000 (age 26)
- Height: 1.80 m (5 ft 11 in)
- Position: Forward

Team information
- Current team: Club Africain
- Number: 34

Youth career
- –2018: Ecole de Football; Brasseries du Cameroun
- 2018–2020: Porto

Senior career*
Years	Team	Apps	(Gls)
2019–2020	Porto B	10	(1)
2020–2021	Olimpik Donetsk	10	(2)
2021	HJK Helsinki	2	(0)
2023	Carabobo	8	(1)
2026-	Club Africain	1	(0)
- * Club domestic league appearances and goals as of 19:13, 25 August 2026 (UTC)

Taddeus Nkeng Fomakwang (born 26 February 2000) is a Cameroonian footballer who plays as a forward.

== Career statistics ==
=== Club ===
As of 2 March 2020.

Club	Season	League			National Cup		League Cup		Other		Total	
Club	Season	Division	Apps	Goals	Apps	Goals	Apps	Goals	Apps	Goals	Apps	Goals
Porto B	2019–20	LigaPro	9	1	–		–		0	0	9	1
Career total			9	1	0	0	0	0	0	0	9	1
