= Khalid Ait Ouarkhane =

Moroccan footballer

Khalid Aït Ouarkhane
Personal information
- Date of birth: 22 April 2000 (age 26)
- Place of birth: Tata, Morocco
- Height: 1.79 m (5 ft 10 in)
- Position: Midfielder

Team information
- Current team: AS FAR
- Number: 8

Youth career
- –2019: AS FAR

Senior career*
Years	Team	Apps	(Gls)
2019–	AS FAR	37	(7)
2022	→ Raja Beni Mellal (loan)	–	(–)
2022–2023	→ JS Soualem (loan)	23	(3)

International career^{‡}
2019	Morocco U20	2	(0)
2019	Morocco Olympic	0	(0)
2025–	Morocco A'	0	(0)
- * Club domestic league appearances and goals as of 8 July 2024 ‡ National team caps and goals as of 8 July 2024

Khalid Aït Ouarkhane (Arabic: خالد آيت أورخان; born 22 April 2000) is a Moroccan professional footballer who plays as a midfielder for AS FAR.

== Club career ==
=== Youth and early years at AS FAR ===
Born in Tata, Aït Ouarkhane joined the youth academy of AS FAR in Rabat at a young age.

On 21 April 2019, he made his professional debut in the Botola against Olympic Safi, coming on as a substitute for Taoufik Safsafi in the 71st minute of a 1–0 loss. Later that season, he made his first start against Moghreb Tétouan in a 2–0 defeat.

In the 2019–20 Botola season, he scored his first professional goal on 4 October 2020 against Raja Beni Mellal in a 3–0 away win.

Returning from loan for the 2023–24 season, he scored his first career brace on 8 February 2024 against SCC Mohammédia, helping AS FAR finish as league runners-up.

=== Loans to Raja Beni Mellal and JS Soualem ===
In January 2022, Aït Ouarkhane was loaned to Raja Beni Mellal in the Moroccan second division for six months.

On 9 August 2023, he joined JS Soualem on a season-long loan, making 23 appearances and scoring three goals.

== International career ==
In August 2019, Aït Ouarkhane was called up by Jamal Sellami to the Morocco U20 squad for the 2019 African Games, hosted in Morocco.

In November 2019, he was selected by Mark Wotte for a training camp with the Morocco Olympic team in El Jadida, and took part in two friendly matches against the Gabon Olympic team.

== Honours ==
Morocco

- African Nations Championship: 2024

AS FAR

- Botola Pro runner-up: 2023–24
