= Brayan León =

Colombian footballer born 2000

Personal information
- Full name: Brayan León Muñiz
- Date of birth: October 19, 2000 (age 26)
- Place of birth: Turbaco, Colombia
- Height: 1.75 m (5 ft 9 in)
- Position: Forward

Team information
- Current team: Mamelodi Sundowns
- Number: 12

Senior career*
Years	Team	Apps	(Gls)
2021–2022	Deportivo Pereira	70	(13)
2023	Atlético Junior	17	(0)
2023–2026	Independiente Medellín	92	(25)
2026–	Mamelodi Sundowns	15	(10)
- * Club domestic league appearances and goals as of 13 May 2026

Brayan León Muñiz (born 19 October 2000) is a Colombian professional footballer who plays as a forward for South African Premiership club Mamelodi Sundowns.

== Career ==
=== Deportivo Pereira ===
Leon began his career with Deportivo Pereira in 2021, and he was part of the team that won the 2022 Torneo Finalizacion title on penalties against Independiente Medellin. Atlético Junior took notice of his performances with Pereira, where he scored eight goals in fifteen games, and signed him in January 2023. However his form declined at Junior, where he made 18 appearances but did not score any goals.

=== Independiente Medellin ===
After Diber Cambindo's exit from the club shortly after the 2023 Apertura tournament concluded, Independiente Medellin signed him as Cambindo's replacement on 17 June 2023. On 19 November 2023, he scored the winning goal in a 2–1 victory over rivals Atlético Nacional in El Clásico Paisa. On 23 October 2023, he scored the winning goal in a 1–0 victory over his former club, Deportivo Pereira. On 3 December, Leon scored a brace in a historic 5–0 victory against rivals Nacional, helping El Poderoso reach the finals.

On 4 November 2024, Leon scored a brace including a last-minute winning goal in an away victory against Atlético Bucaramanga. Leon was a key player for the club in the 2024 Copa Sudamericana, scoring six goals in ten matches, with a notable goal in a 2–1 home victory against defending champions Defensa y Justicia.

=== Mamelodi Sundowns ===
On January 3, 2026, León joined South African Premiership club Mamelodi Sundowns on a three-year deal worth $3.5 million. He made his debut against Orbit College on 19 January 2026 and scored the second goal to help the club to a 2–0 win. He scored his second goal in a 2–0 win over Sekhukhune United and a brace in a space of four minutes in a 2–1 win over Orlando Pirates on 18 February 2026 to leave Sundowns 3 points adrift in the league.

== Honours ==
Deportivo Pereira

- Categoria Primera A: 2022 Finalizacion

Mamelodi Sundowns

- CAF: 2025/26 Caf Champions League winner
