= Tó Carneiro =

Angolan footballer (born 1995)

Personal information
- Full name: Augusto de Jesus Corte Real Carneiro
- Date of birth: 5 November 1995 (age 30)
- Place of birth: Miconge, Cabinda Province, Angola
- Position: Defender

Team information
- Current team: AS FAR
- Number: 2

Senior career*
Years	Team	Apps	(Gls)
2016–2024	Petro de Luanda		
2024–	AS FAR		

International career^{‡}
2017–	Angola	46	(1)
- * Club domestic league appearances and goals as of 3:30, 22 March 2024 (CET) ‡ National team caps and goals as of 13:20, 16 June 2026 (UTC)

Augusto de Jesus Corte Real Carneiro (born 5 November 1995), commonly known as Tó Carneiro, is an Angolan professional football player who plays for AS FAR and the Angolan national team.

== International career ==
He first appeared on 29 June 2017 at the 2017 COSAFA Cup held in South Africa, where he played against Malawi in a 0–0 draw.

On 11 October 2021, he scored an own goal in a 2022 FIFA World Cup qualification loss to Gabon.

On 3 December 2025, Carneiro was called up to the Angola squad for the 2025 Africa Cup of Nations held in Morocco.

=== International goals ===
Scores and results list Angola's goal tally first.

No.	Date	Venue	Opponent	Score	Result	Competition
1.	24 July 2022	Complexe Sportif de Côte d'Or, Saint Pierre, Mauritius	Mauritius	1–0	2–0	2022 African Nations Championship qualification
