= 2025–26 CAF Champions League =

62nd season of the CAF Champions League

TotalEnergies CAF Champions League 2025–2026
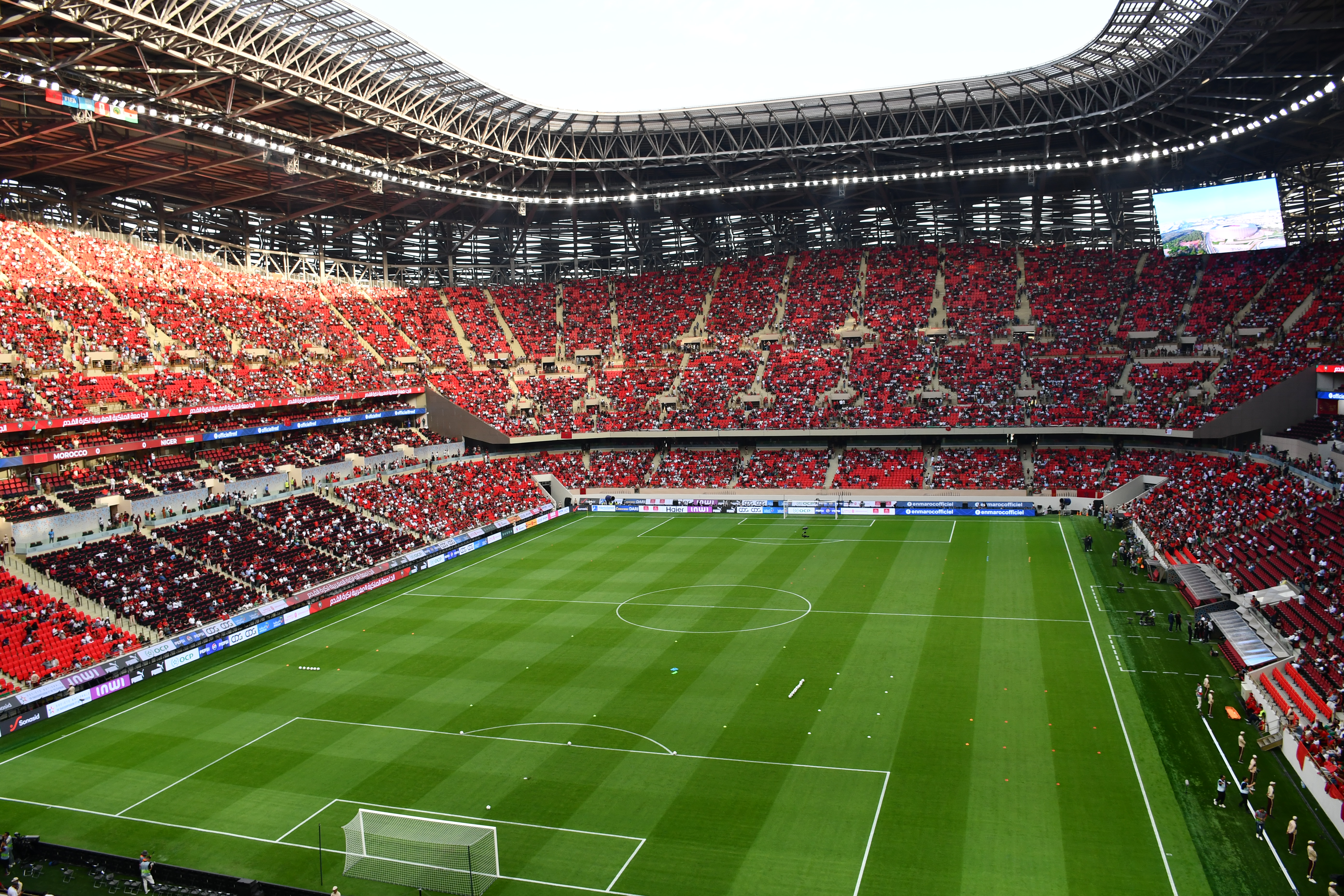
- Prince Moulay Abdellah Stadium in Rabat hosted the second leg of the final

Tournament details
- Dates: Qualification: 16 September – 1 November 2025; Competition proper: 21 November 2025 – 24 May 2026
- Teams: 62 (from 50 associations)

Final positions
- Champions: (South Africa) Mamelodi Sundowns (2nd title)
- Runners-up: (Morocco) AS FAR

Tournament statistics
- Matches played: 62
- Goals scored: 118 (1.9 per match)
- Top scorer: (Egypt) Trézéguet (6 goals)
- (Note: All statistics do not include qualifying rounds)

The 2025–26 CAF Champions League, officially the TotalEnergies CAF Champions League for sponsorship purposes, was the 62nd season of Africa's premier club football tournament organized by the Confederation of African Football (CAF) and the 30th under the CAF Champions League title.

The winners of this edition of the competition, Mamelodi Sundowns, qualified for its next edition, the 2026 FIFA Intercontinental Cup, the 2029 FIFA Club World Cup and earned the right to play against the winners of the 2025–26 CAF Confederation Cup in the 2026 CAF Super Cup.

== Association team allocation ==
All 56 CAF member associations may enter the CAF Champions League, with the 12 highest ranked associations according to the CAF 5-year ranking eligible to enter two teams in the competition. As a result, a maximum of 68 teams could enter the tournament – although this level has never been reached.

For this season's edition, CAF used the 2020–2025 CAF 5-year ranking, which calculates points for each entrant association based on their clubs performance over the 5 years in the CAF Champions League and the CAF Confederation Cup. The criteria for the points were as follows:

	CAF Champions League	CAF Confederation Cup
Winners	6 points	5 points
Runners-up	5 points	4 points
Losing semi-finalists	4 points	3 points
Losing quarter-finalists	3 points	2 points
3rd place in groups	2 points	1 point
4th place in groups	1 point	0.5 point

The points were multiplied by a coefficient according to the season as follows:

- 2024–25: × 5
- 2023–24: × 4
- 2022–23: × 3
- 2021–22: × 2
- 2020–21: × 1

== Teams ==
The following 62 teams from 50 associations entered the competition.

- Bold received a bye to the second round.
- The other teams entered the first round.

Associations are shown according to their CAF 5-year ranking – those with a ranking score have their rank and score (in parentheses) indicated.

Associations eligible to enter two teams (Top 12 associations)
Association	Rank	Team	Qualification method
Egypt	1	Al Ahly	2024–25 Egyptian Premier League champions
Egypt	1	Pyramids	2024–25 CAF Champions League champions 2024–25 Egyptian Premier League runners-up
Morocco	2	RS Berkane	2024–25 Botola Pro champions
Morocco	2	AS FAR	2024–25 Botola Pro runners-up
South Africa	3	Mamelodi Sundowns	2024–25 South African Premiership champions
South Africa	3	Orlando Pirates	2024–25 South African Premiership runners-up
Algeria	4	MC Alger	2024–25 Algerian Ligue Professionnelle 1 champions
Algeria	4	JS Kabylie	2024–25 Algerian Ligue Professionnelle 1 runners-up
Tanzania	5	Young Africans	2024–25 Tanzanian Premier League champions
Tanzania	5	Simba	2024–25 Tanzanian Premier League runners-up
Tunisia	6	Espérance de Tunis	2024–25 Tunisian Ligue Professionnelle 1 champions
Tunisia	6	US Monastir	2024–25 Tunisian Ligue Professionnelle 1 runners-up
Angola	7	Petro de Luanda	2024–25 Girabola champions
Angola	7	Wiliete	2024–25 Girabola runners-up
DR Congo	8	Aigles du Congo	2024–25 Linafoot champions
DR Congo	8	FC Saint-Éloi Lupopo	2024–25 Linafoot runners-up
Sudan	9	Al Hilal	2024–25 Sudan Premier League champions
Sudan	9	Al Merrikh	2024–25 Sudan Premier League runners-up
Ivory Coast	10	Stade d'Abidjan	2024–25 Côte d'Ivoire Ligue 1 champions
Ivory Coast	10	ASEC Mimosas	2024–25 Côte d'Ivoire Ligue 1 runners-up
Libya	11	Al Ahli Tripoli	2024–25 Libyan Premier League champions
Libya	11	Al Hilal Benghazi	2024–25 Libyan Premier League runners-up
Nigeria	12	Remo Stars	2024–25 Nigeria Premier Football League champions
Nigeria	12	Rivers United	2024–25 Nigeria Premier Football League runners-up

Associations eligible to enter one team
Association	Rank	Team	Qualification method
Mali	13	Stade Malien	2024–25 Malian Première Division champions
Ghana	14	Bibiani Gold Stars	2024–25 Ghana Premier League champions
Guinea	15	Horoya	2024–25 Guinée Championnat National champions
Botswana	16	Gaborone United	2024–25 Botswana Premier League champions
Senegal	17	ASC Jaraaf	2024–25 Senegal Ligue 1 champions
Mauritania	18	FC Nouadhibou	2024–25 Super D1 champions
Congo	19	AC Léopards	2024–25 Congo Ligue 1 champions
Cameroon	20	Colombe Sportive	2024–25 Elite One champions
Togo	21	ASC Kara	2024–25 Togolese Championnat National champions
Uganda	22	Vipers	2024–25 Uganda Premier League champions
Mozambique	23	Black Bulls	2024 Moçambola champions
Zambia	24	Power Dynamos	2024–25 Zambia Super League champions
Eswatini	25	Nsingizini Hotspurs	2024–25 Premier League of Eswatini champions
Niger	25	AS FAN	2024–25 Niger Super Ligue champions
Burkina Faso	27	Rahimo	2024–25 Burkinabé Premier League champions
Benin	—	Dadjè	2024–25 Benin Premier League champions
Burundi	—	Aigle Noir	2024–25 Burundi Ligue A champions
Central African Republic	—	AS Tempête	2024–25 Central African Republic League champions
Comoros	—	US Zilimadjou	2024–25 Comoros Premier League champions
Djibouti	—	ASAS Djibouti Télécom	2024–25 Djibouti Premier League champions
Equatorial Guinea	—	Fundación Bata	2024–25 Equatoguinean Primera División champions
Ethiopia	—	Ethiopian Insurance	2024–25 Ethiopian Premier League champions
Gabon	—	Mangasport	2024–25 Gabon Championnat National D1 champions
Gambia	—	Real de Banjul	2024–25 GFA League First Division champions
Kenya	—	Kenya Police	2024–25 Kenyan Premier League champions
Lesotho	—	Lioli	2024–25 Lesotho Premier League champions
Liberia	—	Fassell	2024–25 LFA First Division champions
Madagascar	—	Elgeco Plus	2024–25 Malagasy Pro League champions
Malawi	—	Silver Strikers	2024 Super League of Malawi champions
Mauritius	—	Cercle de Joachim	2024–25 Mauritian Premier League champions
Namibia	—	African Stars	2024–25 Namibia Premiership champions
Rwanda	—	APR	2024–25 Rwanda Premier League champions
Seychelles	—	Côte d'Or	2024–25 Seychelles Premier League champions
Sierra Leone	—	East End Lions	2024–25 Sierra Leone National Premier League champions
Somalia	—	Mogadishu City	2024–25 Somali First Division champions
South Sudan	—	Jamus	2025 South Sudan Football Championship champions
Zanzibar	—	Mlandege	2024–25 Zanzibar Premier League champions
Zimbabwe	—	Simba Bhora	2024 Zimbabwe Premier Soccer League champions

Associations which did not enter a team

- Chad
- Cape Verde
- Eritrea
- Guinea-Bissau
- Réunion
- São Tomé and Príncipe

== Schedule ==
The schedule of the qualifying tournament is as follows.

Phase	Round	Draw date	First leg	Second leg
Qualifying rounds	First round	9 August 2025	19–21 September 2025	26–28 September 2025
Qualifying rounds	Second round	9 August 2025	17–19 October 2025	24 October – 1 November 2025
Group stage	Matchday 1	3 November 2025	21–23 November 2025	
Group stage	Matchday 2	3 November 2025	28–30 November 2025	
Group stage	Matchday 3	3 November 2025	23–25 January 2026	
Group stage	Matchday 4	3 November 2025	30 January – 1 February 2026	
Group stage	Matchday 5	3 November 2025	6–8 February 2026	
Group stage	Matchday 6	3 November 2025	13–15 February 2026	
Knockout stage	Quarter-finals	17 February 2026	13–14 March 2026	20–21 March 2026
Knockout stage	Semi-finals	17 February 2026	10–11 April 2026	17–18 April 2026
Knockout stage	Final	17 February 2026	17 May 2026	24 May 2026

== Qualifying rounds ==
The draw for the qualifying rounds was held on 9 August 2025, 10:00 GMT (13:00 local time, UTC+3), in Dar es Salaam, Tanzania. In the qualifying rounds, each tie was played on a home-and-away two-legged basis. If the aggregate score was tied after the second leg, the away goals rule was applied, and if still tied, extra time was not played, and a penalty shoot-out was used to determine the winner (Regulations III. 13 & 14).

=== First round ===
Team 1	Agg.	Team 2	1st leg	2nd leg
Aigle Noir (Burundi)	1–1 (a)	ASAS Djibouti Télécom	0–0	1–1
Ethiopian Insurance (Ethiopia)	4–3	(Zanzibar) Mlandege	2–0	2–3
APR (Rwanda)	0–5	(Egypt) Pyramids	0–2	0–3
Mogadishu City (Somalia)	3–3 (a)	Kenya Police	1–3	2–0
Jamus (South Sudan)	0–1	(Sudan) Al Hilal	0–0	0–1
Rahimo (Burkina Faso)	0–0 (4–2 p)	(Gabon) Mangasport	0–0	0–0
AS FAN (Niger)	1–7	(Tunisia) Espérance de Tunis	0–3	1–4
Dadjè (Benin)	0–1	(Libya) Al Ahli Tripoli	0–0	0–1
ASC Kara (Togo)	2–4	(Morocco) RS Berkane	1–1	1–3
East End Lions (Sierra Leone)	1–7	(Tunisia) US Monastir	0–4	1–3
Bibiani Gold Stars (Ghana)	0–7	(Algeria) JS Kabylie	0–2	0–5
Fundación Bata (Equatorial Guinea)	0–2	(Mauritania) FC Nouadhibou	0–0	0–2
AS Tempête (Central African Republic)	0–7	(Mali) Stade Malien	0–5	0–2
Al Hilal Benghazi (Libya)	1–2	(Guinea) Horoya	1–0	0–2
Real de Banjul (The Gambia)	1–4	(Morocco) AS FAR	0–2	1–2
Colombe Sportive (Cameroon)	1–0	(Senegal) ASC Jaraaf	0–0	1–0
Fassell (Liberia)	0–3	(Algeria) MC Alger	0–0	0–3
Remo Stars (Nigeria)	5–0	(Comoros) US Zilimadjou	4–0	1–0
Simba Bhora (Zimbabwe)	1–1 (2–4 p)	(Eswatini) Nsingizini Hotspurs	1–0	0–1
Gaborone United (Botswana)	1–2	(Tanzania) Simba	0–1	1–1
Elgeco Plus (Madagascar)	1–1 (a)	(Malawi) Silver Strikers	1–1	0–0
Wiliete (Angola)	0–5	(Tanzania) Young Africans	0–3	0–2
Côte d'Or (Seychelles)	1–5	(Ivory Coast) Stade d'Abidjan	0–2	1–3
Cercle de Joachim (Mauritius)	0–6	(Angola) Petro de Luanda	0–3	0–3
AC Léopards (Republic of the Congo)	0–0 (4–5 p)	(Mozambique) Black Bulls	0–0	0–0
Aigles du Congo (Democratic Republic of the Congo)	0–1	(Nigeria) Rivers United	0–0	0–1
African Stars (Namibia)	0–2	(Uganda) Vipers	0–1	0–1
Power Dynamos (Zambia)	1–1 (5–4 p)	(Ivory Coast) ASEC Mimosas	1–0	0–1
Saint-Éloi Lupopo (Democratic Republic of the Congo)	1–0	(Sudan) Al Merrikh	1–0	0–0
Lioli (Lesotho)	0–7	(South Africa) Orlando Pirates	0–3	0–4

=== Second round ===
The 16 winners of the second round advanced to the group stage.

Team 1	Agg.	Team 2	1st leg	2nd leg
Aigle Noir (Burundi)	0–2	(Egypt) Al Ahly	0–1	0–1
Ethiopian Insurance (Ethiopia)	1–3	(Egypt) Pyramids	1–1	0–2
Kenya Police	1–4	(Sudan) Al Hilal	0–1	1–3
Rahimo (Burkina Faso)	0–4	(Tunisia) Espérance de Tunis	0–1	0–3
Al Ahli Tripoli (Libya)	2–3	(Morocco) RS Berkane	1–1	1–2
US Monastir (Tunisia)	1–5	(Algeria) JS Kabylie	0–3	1–2
FC Nouadhibou (Mauritania)	1–3	(Mali) Stade Malien	1–1	0–2
Horoya (Guinea)	1–4	(Morocco) AS FAR	1–1	0–3
Colombe Sportive (Cameroon)	1–1 (a)	(Algeria) MC Alger	1–1	0–0
Remo Stars (Nigeria)	1–7	(South Africa) Mamelodi Sundowns	1–5	0–2
Nsingizini Hotspurs (Eswatini)	0–3	(Tanzania) Simba	0–3	0–0
Silver Strikers (Malawi)	1–2	(Tanzania) Young Africans	1–0	0–2
Stade d'Abidjan (Ivory Coast)	0–4	(Angola) Petro de Luanda	0–2	0–2
Black Bulls (Mozambique)	2–3	(Nigeria) Rivers United	1–0	1–3
Vipers (Uganda)	2–3	(Zambia) Power Dynamos	1–2	1–1
Saint-Éloi Lupopo (Democratic Republic of the Congo)	3–3 (5–4 p)	(South Africa) Orlando Pirates	3–0	0–3

== Group stage ==
Location of the 2025–26 CAF Champions League group stage teams

The draw for the group stage was held on 3 November 2025, 12:00 GMT (14:00 local time, UTC+2), in Johannesburg, South Africa. The 16 winners of the second round of qualifying rounds were drawn into four groups of four.

The teams were seeded by their performances in the CAF competitions for the previous five seasons (CAF 5-year ranking points shown next to every team). Each group contained one team from each of Pot 1, Pot 2, Pot 3, and Pot 4, and each team was allocated to the positions in their group according to their pot.

Pot 1
Team	Pts
(Egypt) Al Ahly	78
(South Africa) Mamelodi Sundowns	62
(Tunisia) Espérance de Tunis	57
(Morocco) RS Berkane	52

Pot 2
Team	Pts
(Tanzania) Simba	48
(Egypt) Pyramids	47
(Sudan) Al Hilal	34
(Tanzania) Young Africans	34

Pot 3
Team	Pts
(Angola) Petro de Luanda	27
(Morocco) AS FAR	21
(Algeria) MC Alger	18
(Nigeria) Rivers United	14

Pot 4
Team	Pts
(Algeria) JS Kabylie	13
(Mali) Stade Malien	10.5
(Democratic Republic of the Congo) Saint-Éloi Lupopo	3
(Zambia) Power Dynamos	—

=== Group A ===
Pos	Team	Pld	W	D	L	GF	GA	GD	Pts	Qualification	PYR	RSB	PDFC	RUFC
1	(Egypt) Pyramids	6	5	1	0	14	2	+12	16	Advance to knockout stage	—	3–0	3–1	3–0
2	(Morocco) RS Berkane	6	3	1	2	8	6	+2	10	Advance to knockout stage	0–0	—	3–0	3–0
3	(Zambia) Power Dynamos	6	2	1	3	4	7	−3	7		0–1	2–0	—	0–0
4	(Nigeria) Rivers United	6	0	1	5	2	13	−11	1		1–4	1–2	0–1	—

Source: CAF
Rules for classification: Group stage tiebreakers

=== Group B ===
Pos	Team	Pld	W	D	L	GF	GA	GD	Pts	Qualification	AHL	ASFAR	YNG	JSK
1	(Egypt) Al Ahly	6	2	4	0	8	3	+5	10	Advance to knockout stage	—	0–0	2–0	4–1
2	(Morocco) AS FAR	6	2	3	1	3	2	+1	9	Advance to knockout stage	1–1	—	1–0	1–0
3	(Tanzania) Young Africans	6	2	2	2	5	4	+1	8		1–1	1–0	—	3–0
4	(Algeria) JS Kabylie	6	0	3	3	1	8	−7	3		0–0	0–0	0–0	—

Source: CAF

=== Group C ===
Pos	Team	Pld	W	D	L	GF	GA	GD	Pts	Qualification	HIL	MSFC	MCA	FCSEL
1	(Sudan) Al Hilal	6	3	2	1	9	7	+2	11	Advance to knockout stage	—	2–1	2–1	1–0
2	(South Africa) Mamelodi Sundowns	6	2	3	1	9	6	+3	9	Advance to knockout stage	2–2	—	2–0	3–1
3	(Algeria) MC Alger	6	2	1	3	5	6	−1	7		2–1	0–0	—	2–0
4	(Democratic Republic of the Congo) Saint-Éloi Lupopo	6	1	2	3	4	8	−4	5		1–1	1–1	1–0	—

Source: CAF

=== Group D ===
Pos	Team	Pld	W	D	L	GF	GA	GD	Pts	Qualification	SML	EST	APL	SSC
1	(Mali) Stade Malien	6	3	2	1	5	2	+3	11	Advance to knockout stage	—	1–0	2–0	2–1
2	(Tunisia) Espérance de Tunis	6	2	3	1	6	4	+2	9	Advance to knockout stage	0–0	—	2–0	1–0
3	(Angola) Petro de Luanda	6	1	3	2	3	6	−3	6		0–0	1–1	—	1–1
4	(Tanzania) Simba	6	1	2	3	5	7	−2	5		1–0	2–2	0–1	—

Source: CAF

== Knockout stage ==
The mechanism of the draws for each round was as follows:

- In the draw for the quarter-finals, the four group winners were seeded, and the four group runners-up were unseeded. The seeded teams were drawn against the unseeded teams, with the seeded teams hosting the second leg. Teams from the same group could not be drawn against each other, while teams from the same association could be drawn against each other.
- In the draws for the semi-finals, there were no seedings, and teams from the same group or the same association could be drawn against each other. As the draws for the quarter-finals and semi-finals were held together before the quarter-finals were played, the identity of the quarter-final winners was not known at the time of the semi-final draw.

Group	Winners	Runners-up
A	(Egypt) Pyramids	(Morocco) RS Berkane
B	(Egypt) Al Ahly	(Morocco) AS FAR
C	(Sudan) Al Hilal	(South Africa) Mamelodi Sundowns
D	(Mali) Stade Malien	(Tunisia) Espérance de Tunis

=== Bracket ===
The bracket was decided after the draw for the knockout stage, which was held on 17 February 2026, 12:00 GMT (12:00 local time, UTC+2), at the Egyptian Football Association headquarters in Cairo, Egypt.

Quarter-finals
(Tunisia) Espérance de Tunis	1	3	4
(Egypt) Al Ahly	0	2	2
(South Africa) Mamelodi Sundowns	3	0	3
(Mali) Stade Malien	0	2	2
(Morocco) AS FAR	1	2	3
(Egypt) Pyramids	1	1	2
(Morocco) RS Berkane	1	1	2
(Sudan) Al Hilal	1	0	1

Semi-finals
(Tunisia) Espérance de Tunis	0	0	0
(South Africa) Mamelodi Sundowns	1	1	2
(Morocco) AS FAR	2	0	2
(Morocco) RS Berkane	0	1	1

Final
(South Africa) Mamelodi Sundowns	1	1	2
(Morocco) AS FAR	0	1	1

=== Quarter-finals ===
Team 1	Agg.	Team 2	1st leg	2nd leg
RS Berkane (Morocco)	2–1	(Sudan) Al Hilal	1–1	1–0
Espérance de Tunis (Tunisia)	4–2	(Egypt) Al Ahly	1–0	3–2
Mamelodi Sundowns (South Africa)	3–2	(Mali) Stade Malien	3–0	0–2
AS FAR (Morocco)	3–2	(Egypt) Pyramids	1–1	2–1

=== Semi-finals ===
Team 1	Agg.	Team 2	1st leg	2nd leg
Espérance de Tunis (Tunisia)	0–2	(South Africa) Mamelodi Sundowns	0–1	0–1
AS FAR (Morocco)	2–1	(Morocco) RS Berkane	2–0	0–1

=== Final ===
The first leg was played on 17 May, and the second leg was played on 24 May 2025.

Team 1	Agg.	Team 2	1st leg	2nd leg
Mamelodi Sundowns (South Africa)	2–1	(Morocco) AS FAR	1–0	1–1

17 May 2026
16:00 UTC+2

Mamelodi Sundowns (South Africa)	1–0	(Morocco) AS FAR
Modiba 37'	Report

Loftus Versfeld Stadium, Pretoria
Attendance: 51,000
Referee: Jean-Jacques Ndala (DR Congo)
24 May 2026
20:00 UTC+1

AS FAR (Morocco)	1–1	(South Africa) Mamelodi Sundowns
Hrimat 40' (pen.)	Report	Mokoena 45+7'

Prince Moulay Abdellah Stadium, Rabat
Attendance: 60,000
Referee: Omar Artan (Somalia)

Mamelodi Sundowns won 2–1 on aggregate.

== Top goalscorers ==
Team eliminated / inactive for this round.

Rank	Player	Team	MD1	MD2	MD3	MD4	MD5	MD6	QF1	QF2	SF1	SF2	F1	F2	Total
1	(Egypt) Trézéguet	(Egypt) Al Ahly	2	1	2					1					6
2	(Colombia) Brayan León	(South Africa) Mamelodi Sundowns						2	1		1	1			5
2	(Sudan) Abdel Raouf	(Sudan) Al Hilal	1	1	2				1						5
4	(Morocco) Mounir Chouiar	(Morocco) RS Berkane	1	1					1	1					4
4	(Egypt) Ahmed Atef	(Egypt) Pyramids	3			1									4

== See also ==
- 2025–26 CAF Confederation Cup
