= 2024–25 in Algerian football =

Football in Algeria
- Season: 2024–25

Men's football
- Ligue Pro. 1: In progress
- Ligue 2: Centre-east MB Rouissat; Centre-west ES Ben Aknoun
- Inter-Régions: West WA Tlemcen; Centre West JS Tixeraïne; Centre East MO Béjaïa; East NRB Beni Oulbane; South West CRB Adrar; South East CR Béni Thour
- Algerian Cup: In progress
- Super Cup: MC Alger

Women's football
- Women's Championship: CF Akbou
- Women's Cup: JS Kabylie

The 2024–25 season will be the 62th season of competitive association football in Algeria.

== National teams ==
On November 18, 2024, Walid Sadi President of the Algerian Football Federation, entered the new Nadir Larbaoui government as Minister of Sports, succeeding Abderrahmane Hammad.

=== Algeria men's national football team ===
==== Kits ====
Home	Away

=== Results and fixtures ===
==== Friendlies ====
5 June 2025 Friendly	Algeria	2–0	Rwanda	Constantine, Algeria
17:00 UTC+1	Belaïli 28'; Hadjam 58'	Report		Stadium: Mohamed Hamlaoui Stadium; Referee: Mahmood Ali Mahmood Ismail (Sudan)

10 June 2025 Friendly	Sweden	4–3	Algeria	Stockholm, Sweden
--:-- UTC+3				Stadium: Strawberry Arena

==== 2025 Africa Cup of Nations qualification ====
Pos	Team	Pld	W	D	L	GF	GA	GD	Pts	Qualification
1	Algeria	6	5	1	0	16	2	+14	16	Final tournament
2	Equatorial Guinea	6	2	2	2	5	8	−3	8	Final tournament
3	Togo	6	1	2	3	7	10	−3	5	
4	Liberia	6	1	1	4	4	12	−8	4	

Source: CAF
Rules for classification: Tiebreakers

5 September 2024 1	Algeria	2–0	Equatorial Guinea	Oran
20:00 UTC+1	Aouar 69'; Gouiri 90+5'	Report		Stadium: Miloud Hadefi Stadium; Attendance: 34,850; Referee: Djindo Louis Houngnandande (Benin)

10 September 2024 2	Liberia	0–3	Algeria	Monrovia
16:00 UTC+0		Report	Gouiri 17'; Zorgane 25'; Bounedjah 80'	Stadium: Samuel Kanyon Doe Sports Complex; Attendance: 21,754; Referee: Peter Waweru (Kenya)

10 October 2024 3	Algeria	5–1	Togo	Annaba
20:00 UTC+1	Benrahma 29', 55' (pen.); Aouar 68'; Gouiri 86'; Amoura 90+5'	Report	Klidjé 11'	Stadium: 19 May 1956 Stadium; Attendance: 60,000; Referee: Boubou Traoré (Mali)

14 October 2024 4	Togo	0–1	Algeria	Lomé
16:00 UTC+0		Report	Bensebaini 18' (pen.)	Stadium: Stade de Kégué; Referee: Jean-Jacques Ndala (Congo DR)

14 November 2024 5	Equatorial Guinea	0–0	Algeria	Malabo
13:00 UTC+1		Report		Stadium: Estadio de Malabo; Referee: Kalilou Ibrahim Traoré (Ivory Coast)

17 November 2024 6	Algeria	5–1	Liberia	Tizi Ouzou
16:00 UTC+1	Mandi 20'; Mahrez 29'; Bounedjah 64'; Gouiri 74'; Amoura 90+5'	Report	Dweh 6'	Stadium: Hocine Aït Ahmed Stadium; Referee: Tanguy Mebiame (Gabon)

==== 2026 FIFA World Cup qualification ====
Pos	Team	Pld	W	D	L	GF	GA	GD	Pts	Qualification
1	Algeria	10	8	1	1	24	8	+16	25	2026 FIFA World Cup
2	Uganda	10	6	0	4	14	9	+5	18	
3	Mozambique	10	6	0	4	14	17	−3	18	
4	Guinea	10	4	3	3	11	8	+3	15	
5	Botswana	10	3	1	6	12	16	−4	10	
6	Somalia	10	0	1	9	3	20	−17	1	

Source: FIFA
Rules for classification: Tiebreakers

21 March 2025 5	Botswana	1–3	Algeria	Francistown
15:00 UTC+2	Kopelang 70'	Report (FIFA); Report (CAF)	Gouiri 44'; Amoura 52', 74'	Stadium: Obed Itani Chilume Stadium; Attendance: 3,278; Referee: Ahmed Arajiga (Tanzania)

25 March 2025 6	Algeria	5–1	Mozambique	Tizi Ouzou
22:00 UTC+1	Amoura 8', 30', 80'; Mandi 24'; Hadjam 65'	Report (FIFA); Report (CAF)	Geny Catamo 40'	Stadium: Hocine Aït Ahmed Stadium; Referee: Pacifique Ndabihawenimana (Burundi)

==== Algeria U-20 ====
17 November 2024 1	Algeria	1–1	Egypt	Ismailia
20:00 UTC+2	Kohili Benahmed 86' (pen.)		Mohamed Zaalouk 57'	Stadium: Suez Canal Stadium

20 November 2024 2	Algeria	1–1	Morocco	Ismailia
20:00 UTC+2	Mohamed Zeghadi 14'		Zabiri 86'	Stadium: Suez Canal Stadium

23 November 2024 3	Tunisia	2–1	Algeria	Ismailia
17:00 UTC+2	Issam Abdelhamid Naïm 76' (o.g.); Amanallah Mehrezi 90+6'		Islam Abbes 81'	Stadium: Suez Canal Stadium

26 November 2024 4	Algeria	4–0	Libya	Ismailia
18:00 UTC+2	Lahlou Akhrib 75', 80'; Oussama Benattia 78'; Mohamed Ramdaoui 84'			Stadium: Ismailia Stadium

==== Algeria U-17 ====
11 November 2024 1	Algeria	0–1	Tunisia	Casablanca
17:00 UTC+1		Report	Anisse Saidi 45'	Stadium: Père Jégo Stadium

14 November 2024 2	Egypt	2–1	Algeria	Casablanca
17:00 UTC+1	Mohamed Hamad 59'; Hamza Abdelkarim 67'		Charaf Eddine Cherfaoui 45' (pen.)	Stadium: Père Jégo Stadium

17 November 2024 3	Libya	2–3	Algeria	Mohammedia
20:00 UTC+1	Anas Al Shawish 26'; Sanad Abdulwahab 64' (pen.)		Benaissa Fettouche 37'; Youcef Boudouab 40', 67'	Stadium: El Bachir Stadium

23 November 2024 4	Algeria	1–1	Morocco	Mohammedia
18:00 UTC+1	Abderrahmane Achouri 5'		Bilal Soukrat 59'	Stadium: El Bachir Stadium

== CAF competitions ==
=== CAF Champions League ===
==== Qualifying rounds ====
===== First round =====
Team 1	Agg.	Team 2	1st leg	2nd leg
AC Léopards (Republic of the Congo)	0–3	(Algeria) CR Belouizdad	0–2	0–1
Watanga (Liberia)	0–4	(Algeria) MC Alger	0–2	0–2

===== Second round =====
Team 1	Agg.	Team 2	1st leg	2nd leg
AS Douanes (Burkina Faso)	1–1 (3–4 p)	(Algeria) CR Belouizdad	1–0	0–1
US Monastir (Tunisia)	1–2	(Algeria) MC Alger	1–0	0–2

==== Group stage ====
===== Group A =====
Pos	Team	Pld	W	D	L	GF	GA	GD	Pts	Qualification	HIL	MCA	YNG	TPM
1	(Sudan) Al Hilal	6	3	1	2	6	7	−1	10	Advance to knockout stage	—	1–1	0–1	2–1
2	(Algeria) MC Alger	6	2	3	1	4	2	+2	9	Advance to knockout stage	0–1	—	2–0	1–0
3	(Tanzania) Young Africans	6	2	2	2	5	6	−1	8		0–2	0–0	—	3–1
4	(Democratic Republic of the Congo) TP Mazembe	6	1	2	3	7	7	0	5		4–0	0–0	1–1	—

Source: CAF

===== Group C =====
Pos	Team	Pld	W	D	L	GF	GA	GD	Pts	Qualification	OPFC	AHL	CRB	SAB
1	(South Africa) Orlando Pirates	6	4	2	0	10	4	+6	14	Advance to knockout stage	—	0–0	2–1	3–0
2	(Egypt) Al Ahly	6	3	1	2	14	7	+7	10	Advance to knockout stage	1–2	—	6–1	4–2
3	(Algeria) CR Belouizdad	6	3	0	3	11	10	+1	9		1–2	1–0	—	6–0
4	(Ivory Coast) Stade d'Abidjan	6	0	1	5	4	18	−14	1		1–1	1–3	0–1	—

Source: CAF

=== CAF Confederation Cup ===
==== Qualifying rounds ====
===== First round =====
Team 1	Agg.	Team 2	1st leg	2nd leg
CS Constantine (Algeria)	4–1	(Rwanda) Police FC	2–0	2–1

===== Second round =====
Team 1	Agg.	Team 2	1st leg	2nd leg
Stade Tunisien (Tunisia)	1–2	(Algeria) USM Alger	1–0	0–2
Nsoatreman (Ghana)	0–3	(Algeria) CS Constantine	0–2	0–1

==== Group stage ====
===== Group A =====
Pos	Team	Pld	W	D	L	GF	GA	GD	Pts	Qualification	SSC	CSC	FCB	CSS
1	(Tanzania) Simba	6	4	1	1	8	4	+4	13	Advance to knockout stage	—	2–0	1–0	2–1
2	(Algeria) CS Constantine	6	4	0	2	12	6	+6	12	Advance to knockout stage	2–1	—	4–0	3–0
3	(Angola) Bravos do Maquis	6	2	1	3	7	14	−7	7		1–1	3–2	—	3–2
4	(Tunisia) CS Sfaxien	6	1	0	5	7	10	−3	3		0–1	0–1	4–0	—

Source: CAF

===== Group C =====
Pos	Team	Pld	W	D	L	GF	GA	GD	Pts	Qualification	USMA	ASEC	JAR	ORP
1	(Algeria) USM Alger	6	4	2	0	14	2	+12	14	Advance to knockout stage	—	3–0	2–0	6–0
2	(Ivory Coast) ASEC Mimosas	6	2	2	2	7	5	+2	8 (Note: Ranked on goal difference in head-to-head matches: ASEC Mimosas +1, ASC Jaraaf –1.)	Advance to knockout stage	1–1	—	2–0	4–0
3	(Senegal) ASC Jaraaf	6	2	2	2	2	4	−2	8		0–0	1–0	—	1–0
4	(Botswana) Orapa United	6	0	2	4	1	13	−12	2		1–2	0–0	0–0	—

Source: CAF

=== CAF Women's Champions League ===
==== UNAF Qualifiers ====
Pos	Team	Pld	W	D	L	GF	GA	GD	Pts	Qualification
1	(Morocco) AS FAR	3	3	0	0	10	0	+10	9	Main tournament
2	(Egypt) Tutankhamun	3	2	0	1	11	3	+8	6	
3	(Algeria) CF Akbou (H)	3	1	0	2	6	9	−3	3	
4	(Tunisia) ASF Sousse	3	0	0	3	1	16	−15	0	

Source: UNAF
(H) Hosts

== Promotion and relegation ==
=== Pre-season ===
League	Promoted to league	Relegated from league
Ligue 1	Olympique Akbou; ES Mostaganem	ES Ben Aknoun; US Souf
Ligue 2	MC Saïda; JS El Biar; JS Djijel; US Chaouia; US Béchar Djedid; MB Rouissat	AS Aïn M'lila; E Sour El Ghozlane; MC El Eulma; WA Boufarik; Olympique de Médéa; JS Guir
Inter Régions	CAS Abdelmoumen; O Sidi Ben Adda; JS Tixeraïne; MS Cherchell; A El Eulma; IRB Sedrata; NRC Boudjelbana; MC El Abiodh Sidi Cheikh; USM Tindouf; CRB Djemaa; IB Laghouat	

== League season ==
=== Ligue Professionnelle 1 ===
On June 27, 2024, The federal office approved the calendar for the 2024–25 Ligue 1 season with the aim of ending on May 31, 2025. The first round is scheduled for September 14, this delay is motivated both by an extended end of the 2023–24 season but also by the holding of early presidential elections which will take place on September 7, 2024. However, the Ligue de Football Professionnel decided to postpone the start of the Ligue 1 by a week, on September 21. Following urgent requests from certain clubs, the Algerian Football Federation has decided to increase the number of foreign players in the Ligue 1. After having formally passed through the technical college chaired by Rabah Saâdane, the FAF ratified the increase in the number of foreigners per club from 3 to 5. However, that there is a provision intended to serve as a safeguard for the license of a foreign player or coach to be validated, the club must pay the federation a deposit equivalent to 12 months salary. This is to protect against any financial dispute.

The Algerian Ligue Professionnelle 1 will see the introduction of Video assistant referee this season. VAR will be used from the first round of the Ligue 1. The VAR will not be able to be used for all matches because several stadiums do not meet standards, making it impossible to install the necessary equipment. The FAF received the first fully equipped stations, in accordance with an agreement duly signed with the Portuguese company Medialuso, following a call for tenders for a rental. The rest of the equipment should be received. In addition to the equipment, the Portuguese company has also sent five technicians who will be responsible for the operation and maintenance of the devices.

Pos	Team	Pld	W	D	L	GF	GA	GD	Pts	Qualification or relegation
1	MC Alger (C)	30	15	13	2	39	19	+20	58	Qualification for CAF Champions League
2	JS Kabylie	30	16	8	6	42	27	+15	56	Qualification for CAF Champions League
3	CR Belouizdad	30	15	10	5	44	21	+23	55	Qualification for Confederation Cup (Note: USMA Alger qualified for the 2025–26 CAF Confederation Cup by winning the 2024–25 Algerian Cup)
4	JS Saoura	30	12	7	11	34	36	−2	43	
5	Paradou AC	30	11	8	11	41	39	+2	41	
6	ES Sétif	30	11	8	11	21	24	−3	41	
7	USM Alger	30	10	10	10	26	26	0	40	Qualification for Confederation Cup
8	MC Oran	30	12	4	14	32	33	−1	40	
9	USM Khenchela	30	11	7	12	28	38	−10	40	
10	CS Constantine	30	9	12	9	31	31	0	39	
11	Olympique Akbou	30	9	10	11	24	23	+1	37	
12	MC El Bayadh	30	9	9	12	23	26	−3	36	
13	ASO Chlef	30	7	13	10	24	27	−3	34	
14	ES Mostaganem	30	8	10	12	23	31	−8	34	
15	NC Magra (R)	30	7	10	13	23	35	−12	31	Relegation to Algerian Ligue 2
16	US Biskra (R)	30	3	11	16	12	31	−19	20	Relegation to Algerian Ligue 2

Source: the-sports.org
Rules for classification: 1) points; 2) head-to-head points; 3) head-to-head goal difference; 4) goal difference; 5) total goals; 6) fairplay ranking; 7) playoff.
(C) Champions; (R) Relegated

=== Ligue 2 ===
On July 18, 2024, the FAF published the 2024–25 regulatory provisions concerning the Ligue 2. The Algerian championship of the 2nd division called Championnat de football ligue 2. It is contested by 32 clubs in two groups. Centre-east and Centre-west Each group is composed of 16 clubs. At the end of the last day of Ligue 2, the 3 clubs ranked last in each group are relegated to the Inter Régions. The commitment fees for the 2024–25 season are in the order of Two Million Five Hundred Thousand Dinars covering all categories. The start of the 2024–25 season of the Ligue 2 is set for Friday, September 20, announced the Ligue Nationale du Football Amateur (LNFA), in a press release published on the official website.

Group Centre East
Pos	Team	Pld	W	D	L	GF	GA	GD	Pts	Promotion or relegation
1	MB Rouissat (P)	30	22	5	3	45	14	+31	71	Promotion to 2025–26 Ligue 1
2	USM El Harrach	30	21	7	2	52	15	+37	70	
3	JS Djijel	30	14	6	10	45	25	+20	48	
4	USM Annaba	30	13	8	9	45	34	+11	47	
5	MO Constantine	30	13	4	13	43	39	+4	43	
6	IB Khémis El Khechna	30	12	6	12	34	34	0	42	
7	US Chaouia	30	12	6	12	33	35	−2	42	
8	CA Batna	30	11	9	10	39	37	+2	41 (Note: CA Batna were deducted one point.)	
9	HB Chelghoum Laïd	30	11	8	11	30	31	−1	41	
10	AS Khroub	30	11	7	12	44	38	+6	40	
11	JS Bordj Ménaïel	30	11	7	12	30	32	−2	40	
12	MSP Batna	30	10	9	11	30	35	−5	39 (Note: MSP Batna were deducted one point.)	
13	NRB Teleghma	30	8	14	8	31	32	−1	37 (Note: NRB Teleghma were deducted one point.)	
14	IRB Ouargla (R)	30	7	8	15	30	43	−13	27 (Note: IRB Ouargla were deducted two points.)	Relegation to Inter-Régions
15	Olympique Magrane (R)	30	5	4	21	28	66	−38	17 (Note: Olympique Magrane were deducted two points.)	Relegation to Inter-Régions
16	US Souf (R)	30	3	4	23	29	78	−49	13 (Note: US Souf were deducted three points.)	Relegation to Inter-Régions

Updated to match(es) played on 17 May 2025. Source: lnf-amateur.dz
Rules for classification: 1) points; 2) head-to-head points; 3) head-to-head goal difference; 4) goal difference; 5) total goals; 6) fairplay ranking; 7) playoff.
(P) Promoted; (R) Relegated
Notes:

Group Centre West
Pos	Team	Pld	W	D	L	GF	GA	GD	Pts	Promotion or relegation
1	ES Ben Aknoun (P)	30	19	10	1	44	14	+30	67	Promotion to 2025–26 Ligue 1
2	RC Kouba	30	15	10	5	43	22	+21	55	
3	JS El Biar	30	16	7	7	37	21	+16	55	
4	NA Hussein Dey	30	11	13	6	35	25	+10	46	
5	WA Mostaganem	30	12	7	11	35	32	+3	43	
6	CR Témouchent	30	10	10	10	32	25	+7	40	
7	ASM Oran	30	10	10	10	21	22	−1	40	
8	ESM Koléa	30	10	10	10	28	32	−4	40	
9	MC Saïda	30	9	12	9	28	29	−1	39	
10	JSM Tiaret	30	9	13	8	32	30	+2	37 (Note: JSM Tiaret were deducted three points.)	
11	RC Arbaâ	30	10	7	13	35	37	−2	37	
12	US Béchar Djedid	30	10	7	13	40	46	−6	37	
13	GC Mascara	30	10	9	11	31	38	−7	37 (Note: GC Mascara were deducted two points.)	
14	SKAF Khemis Miliana (R)	30	8	8	14	31	33	−2	30 (Note: SKAF Khemis Miliana were deducted two points.)	Relegation to Inter-Régions
15	MCB Oued Sly (R)	30	7	4	19	22	42	−20	22 (Note: MCB Oued Sly were deducted three points.)	Relegation to Inter-Régions
16	SC Mécheria (R)	30	3	3	24	15	43	−28	12 (Note: SC Mécheria were deducted two points.)	Relegation to Inter-Régions

Updated to match(es) played on 1 March 2025. Source: lnf-amateur.dz
Rules for classification: 1) points; 2) head-to-head points; 3) head-to-head goal difference; 4) goal difference; 5) total goals; 6) fairplay ranking; 7) playoff.
(P) Promoted; (R) Relegated

=== Inter-Régions Division ===
West
Pos	Team	Pld	W	D	L	GF	GA	GD	Pts	Promotion or relegation
1	WA Tlemcen (C, P)	30	26	2	2	83	15	+68	79 (Note: WA Tlemcen were deducted 1 points)	Ligue 2
2	USM Bel Abbès	30	25	3	2	71	9	+62	78	
3	RC Relizane	30	19	4	7	51	26	+25	60 (Note: RC Relizane were deducted 1 points)	
4	IRB El Kerma	30	16	3	11	49	42	+7	49 (Note: IRB El Kerma were deducted 2 points)	
5	O Sidi Ben Adda	30	15	4	11	37	31	+6	49	
6	IS Tighennif	30	13	6	11	38	28	+10	42 (Note: IS Tighennif were deducted 3 points)	
7	IR Bouhenni Tiaret	30	13	5	12	36	34	+2	41 (Note: IR Bouhenni Tiaret were deducted 3 points)	
8	JS Bendaoud	30	12	5	13	39	42	−3	41	
9	US Remchi	30	12	2	16	33	30	+3	36 (Note: US Remchi were deducted 2 points)	
10	FCB Telagh	30	12	2	16	41	41	0	36 (Note: FCB Telagh were deducted 2 points)	
11	CAS Abdelmoumen	30	11	5	14	34	44	−10	36 (Note: CA Sidi Abdelmoumen were deducted 2 points)	
12	SCM Oran	30	7	13	10	40	29	+11	34	
13	ICS Tlemcen	30	9	4	17	40	50	−10	28 (Note: IC Sidi Said Tlemcen were deducted 3 points)	
14	JS Emir Abdelkader	30	8	6	16	36	56	−20	28 (Note: JS Emir Abdelkader were deducted 2 points)	Qualification for the Relegation play-off
15	ES Tighennif (R)	30	6	4	20	24	88	−64	13 (Note: ES Tighennif were deducted 9 points)	Relegation to Ligue Régional I
16	Nasr Es Senia (R)	30	0	4	26	18	105	−87	−30 (Note: Nasr Es Senia were deducted 34 points)	Relegation to Ligue Régional I

Updated to match(es) played on 29 May 2025. Source: lnf-amateur.dz
Rules for classification: 1) points; 2) head-to-head points; 3) head-to-head goal difference; 4) goal difference; 5) total goals; 6) fairplay ranking; 7) playoff.
(C) Champions; (P) Promoted; (R) Relegated
Notes:

Centre West
Pos	Team	Pld	W	D	L	GF	GA	GD	Pts	Promotion or relegation
1	JS Tixeraïne (C, P)	30	18	8	4	42	14	+28	62	Ligue 2
2	CR Zaouia	30	17	11	2	48	17	+31	62	
3	CRB Beni Tamou	30	16	8	6	48	24	+24	53 (Note: CRB Beni Tamou were deducted 3 points)	
4	WAB Tissemsilt	30	16	4	10	48	27	+21	50 (Note: WAB Tissemsilt were deducted 2 points)	
5	USM Blida	30	14	10	6	43	23	+20	50 (Note: USM Blida were deducted 2 points)	
6	CRB Aïn Oussara	30	11	7	12	40	35	+5	39 (Note: CRB Aïn Oussara were deducted 1 points)	
7	ORB Oued Fodda	30	10	8	12	29	39	−10	38	
8	JS Haï Djabel	30	13	3	14	26	35	−9	37 (Note: JS Haï Djabel were deducted 5 points)	
9	Olympique de Médéa	30	10	6	14	34	43	−9	36	
10	WA Boufarik	30	8	11	11	27	33	−6	35	
11	MS Cherchell	30	8	10	12	28	41	−13	34	
12	WB Meftah	30	9	6	15	34	45	−11	33	
13	CB Beni Slimane	30	6	12	12	27	39	−12	30	
14	RA Ain Defla	30	8	5	17	21	50	−29	29	Qualification for the Relegation play-off
15	IRB Sougueur	30	8	6	16	23	44	−21	29 (Note: IRB Sougueur were deducted 1 points)	Qualification for the Relegation play-off
16	HRB Fouka (R)	28	6	5	17	29	38	−9	23	Relegation to Ligue Régional I

Updated to match(es) played on 29 May 2025. Source: lnf-amateur.dz
Rules for classification: 1) points; 2) head-to-head points; 3) head-to-head goal difference; 4) goal difference; 5) total goals; 6) fairplay ranking; 7) playoff.
(C) Champions; (P) Promoted; (R) Relegated
Notes:

Centre East
Pos	Team	Pld	W	D	L	GF	GA	GD	Pts	Promotion or relegation
1	MO Béjaïa (C, P)	30	20	9	1	49	14	+35	69	Ligue 2
2	JS Boumerdes	30	18	7	5	38	19	+19	61	
3	AB Barika	30	14	8	8	40	26	+14	49 (Note: AB Barika were deducted 1 points)	
4	JS Azazga	30	13	6	11	30	27	+3	45	
5	RC Bougaa	30	12	8	10	42	36	+6	44	
6	JSM Béjaïa	30	11	10	9	42	33	+9	42 (Note: JSM Béjaïa were deducted 1 points)	
7	A El Eulma	30	10	8	12	29	28	+1	37 (Note: A El Eulma were deducted 1 points)	
8	MC El Eulma	30	10	8	12	30	31	−1	37 (Note: MC El Eulma were deducted 1 points)	
9	USB Berhoum	30	10	7	13	30	38	−8	37	
10	MB Barika	30	10	6	14	32	34	−2	36	
11	A Bou Saada	30	11	5	14	22	31	−9	36 (Note: A Bou Saada were deducted 2 points)	
12	USM Sétif	30	9	7	14	36	39	−3	34	
13	E Sour El Ghozlane	30	8	10	12	24	34	−10	34	
14	AS Bordj Ghedir	30	9	6	15	29	41	−12	33	Qualification for the Relegation play-off
15	ES Bouakeul	30	9	6	15	35	52	−17	33	Qualification for the Relegation play-off
16	IB Lakhdaria (R)	30	9	3	18	26	51	−25	30	Relegation to Ligue Régional I

Updated to match(es) played on 29 May 2025. Source: lnf-amateur.dz
Rules for classification: 1) points; 2) head-to-head points; 3) head-to-head goal difference; 4) goal difference; 5) total goals; 6) fairplay ranking; 7) playoff.
(C) Champions; (P) Promoted; (R) Relegated
Notes:

East
Pos	Team	Pld	W	D	L	GF	GA	GD	Pts	Promotion or relegation
1	NRB Beni Oulbane (C, P)	30	20	7	3	45	18	+27	67	Ligue 2
2	ES Guelma	30	17	9	4	43	12	+31	60	
3	US Faubourg Constantine	30	16	6	8	43	21	+22	54	
4	AS Aïn M'lila	30	15	6	9	43	31	+12	49 (Note: AS Aïn M'lila were deducted 2 points)	
5	JSM Skikda	30	14	7	9	40	31	+9	47 (Note: JSM Skikda were deducted 2 points)	
6	CB Mila	30	12	8	10	38	29	+9	44	
7	IRB Sedrata	30	13	3	14	41	35	+6	41 (Note: IRB Sedrata were deducted 1 points)	
8	Nasr El Fedjoudj	30	10	9	11	35	35	0	39	
9	NRC Boudjelbana	30	11	5	14	40	44	−4	36 (Note: NRC Boudjelbana were deducted 2 points)	
10	JB Aïn Kercha	30	9	10	11	38	42	−4	36 (Note: JB Aïn Kercha were deducted 1 points)	
11	US Tébessa	30	11	5	14	32	50	−18	36 (Note: US Tébessa were deducted 2 points)	
12	NRB Tazouguert	30	10	4	16	36	47	−11	34	
13	US Boukhadra	30	8	11	11	30	29	+1	33 (Note: US Boukhadra were deducted 2 points)	
14	CRB Aïn Yagout	30	9	5	16	29	41	−12	32 (Note: CRB Aïn Yagout were deducted 1 points)	Qualification for the Relegation play-off
15	CRB Aïn Fakroun	30	8	5	17	26	45	−19	28 (Note: CRB Aïn Fakroun were deducted 1 points)	Qualification for the Relegation play-off
16	WA Zighoud Youcef (R)	30	4	6	20	20	68	−48	12 (Note: WA Zighoud Youcef were deducted 6 points)	Relegation to Ligue Régional I

Updated to match(es) played on 29 May 2024. Source: lnf-amateur.dz
Rules for classification: 1) points; 2) head-to-head points; 3) head-to-head goal difference; 4) goal difference; 5) total goals; 6) fairplay ranking; 7) playoff.
(C) Champions; (P) Promoted; (R) Relegated
Notes:

South West
Pos	Team	Pld	W	D	L	GF	GA	GD	Pts	Promotion or relegation
1	A Aïn Sefra	0	0	0	0	0	0	0	0	Ligue 2
2	CRB Adrar	0	0	0	0	0	0	0	0	
3	CRB Bougtob	0	0	0	0	0	0	0	0	
4	CRB Tindouf	0	0	0	0	0	0	0	0	
5	IR Makmen Ben Amar	0	0	0	0	0	0	0	0	
6	IR Mecheria	0	0	0	0	0	0	0	0	
7	JRB Taghit	0	0	0	0	0	0	0	0	
8	JS Guir Abadla	0	0	0	0	0	0	0	0	
9	MC Ghassoul	0	0	0	0	0	0	0	0	
10	MC El Abiodh Sidi Cheikh	0	0	0	0	0	0	0	0	
11	MC Zaouia Hinoun Aoulef	0	0	0	0	0	0	0	0	
12	NRB Fenoughil	0	0	0	0	0	0	0	0	
13	NRB Sbaa	0	0	0	0	0	0	0	0	
14	NRC Hattaba Adrar	0	0	0	0	0	0	0	0	Qualification for the Relegation play-off
15	US Naâma	0	0	0	0	0	0	0	0	Relegation to Ligue Régional I
16	USM Tindouf	0	0	0	0	0	0	0	0	Relegation to Ligue Régional I

Updated to match(es) played on 1 June 2024. Source: lnf-amateur.dz
Rules for classification: 1) points; 2) head-to-head points; 3) head-to-head goal difference; 4) goal difference; 5) total goals; 6) fairplay ranking; 7) playoff.

South East
Pos	Team	Pld	W	D	L	GF	GA	GD	Pts	Promotion or relegation
1	ASB Metlili Châamba	0	0	0	0	0	0	0	0	Ligue 2
2	CRB Djemaa	0	0	0	0	0	0	0	0	
3	CR Béni Thour	0	0	0	0	0	0	0	0	
4	CSSW Illizi	0	0	0	0	0	0	0	0	
5	IRB Kheneg	0	0	0	0	0	0	0	0	
6	IB Laghouat	0	0	0	0	0	0	0	0	
7	IRB Nezla	0	0	0	0	0	0	0	0	
8	IRB Robbah	0	0	0	0	0	0	0	0	
9	IRB Zaouia El Abidia	0	0	0	0	0	0	0	0	
10	MB Hassi Messaoud	0	0	0	0	0	0	0	0	
11	NRB Touggourt	0	0	0	0	0	0	0	0	
12	NT Souf	0	0	0	0	0	0	0	0	
13	Olympique El Oued	0	0	0	0	0	0	0	0	
14	TR Tigdidine	0	0	0	0	0	0	0	0	Qualification for the Relegation play-off
15	UR Hamadine	0	0	0	0	0	0	0	0	Relegation to Ligue Régional I
16	USB Hassi R'mel	0	0	0	0	0	0	0	0	Relegation to Ligue Régional I

Updated to match(es) played on 1 June 2024. Source: lnf-amateur.dz
Rules for classification: 1) points; 2) head-to-head points; 3) head-to-head goal difference; 4) goal difference; 5) total goals; 6) fairplay ranking; 7) playoff.

== National Cups ==
=== Super Cup ===
8 February 2025
17:00

MC Alger	2–2	CR Belouizdad
Bayazid 14' (pen.); Abdellaoui 27'	Report	Mahious 72' (pen.), 88'
Penalties
Abdellaoui (penalty scored); Halaïmia (penalty missed); Ghezala (penalty scored); Bouras (penalty scored); Messoussa (penalty scored)	4–3	(penalty scored) Meziane; (penalty scored) Mayo; (penalty scored) Benayada; (penalty missed) Khacef; (penalty missed) Mahious

Stade du 5 Juillet, Algiers
Referee: Lahlou Benbraham

== Women's football ==
=== Algerian Women's Championship ===
Pos	Team	Pld	W	D	L	GF	GA	GD	Pts	Qualification or relegation
1	CF Akbou	20	20	0	0	140	7	+133	60	Qualification for 2025 CAF W-CL
2	Afak Relizane	20	16	1	3	80	12	+68	49	
3	JF Khroub	20	15	2	3	65	19	+46	47	
4	US Biskra	20	12	3	5	32	17	+15	39	
5	ASE Alger Centre	20	6	4	10	22	27	−5	22	
6	CEA Sétif	20	5	5	10	14	37	−23	20	
7	CS Constantine	20	5	5	10	20	52	−32	19 (Note: AS Oran Centre and CS Constantine were deducted 1 point.)	
8	FC Béjaïa	20	4	5	11	14	28	−14	17	
9	AR Guelma	20	4	4	12	14	59	−45	16	
10	AS Evasion Béjaïa	20	3	4	13	11	67	−56	13	Relegation to 2025–26 D1 National Champ.
11	AS Oran Centre	20	1	5	14	19	106	−87	7	Relegation to 2025–26 D1 National Champ.
12	CF Ténès	0	0	0	0	0	0	0	0	General withdraw

Updated to match(es) played on May 22, 2025. Source: lnff.dz
Rules for classification: 1) Points; 2) Results between teams 3) Goal difference; 4) Number of goals scored

== Managerial changes ==
This is a list of changes of managers within Algerian Ligue Professionnelle 1:

Team	Outgoing manager	Manner of departure	Date of vacancy	Position in table	Incoming manager	Date of appointment
USM Alger	(Spain) Juan Carlos Garrido	End of contract	14 June 2024	Pre-season	(Tunisia) Nabil Maâloul	13 July 2024
ASO Chlef	(Algeria) Chérif Hadjar	End of contract	14 June 2024	Pre-season	(Algeria) Samir Zaoui	15 July 2024
CR Belouizdad	(Brazil) Marcos Paquetá	End of contract	6 July 2024	Pre-season	(France) Corentin Martins	16 July 2024
CS Constantine	(Algeria) Abdelkader Amrani	End of contract	29 June 2024	Pre-season	(Algeria) Kheïreddine Madoui	19 July 2024
JS Kabylie	(Algeria) Abdelkader Bahloul	End of contract	15 June 2024	Pre-season	(Algeria) Abdelhak Benchikha	30 June 2024
Paradou AC	(Algeria) Abdelkarim Saber Cherif	End of contract	15 June 2024	Pre-season	(Tunisia) Radhi Jaïdi	15 July 2024
USM Khenchela	(Algeria) Moufdi Cherdoud	End of contract	15 June 2024	Pre-season	(Tunisia) Hatem Missaoui	4 August 2024
ES Sétif	(Tunisia) Ammar Souayah	Mutual consent	9 July 2024	Pre-season	(Algeria) Rédha Bendris	10 July 2024
JS Saoura	(Algeria) Fouad Bouali	Sacked	15 June 2024	Pre-season	(Algeria) Tahar Chérif El-Ouazzani	25 July 2024
MC El Bayadh	(Algeria) Abdelhaq Belaid	Sacked	15 June 2024	Pre-season	(Algeria) Fouad Bouali	14 August 2024
Olympique Akbou	(Algeria) Mourad Karouf	End of contract	15 July 2024	Pre-season	(Tunisia) Moez Bouakaz	29 July 2024
ES Mostaganem	(Algeria) Rédha Bendris	End of contract	15 June 2024	Pre-season	(Algeria) Chérif Hadjar	1 July 2024
JS Saoura	(Algeria) Tahar Chérif El-Ouazzani	Mutual consent	15 September 2024	15th	(Algeria) Moustapha Djallit	15 September 2024
JS Saoura	(Algeria) Moustapha Djallit	Caretaker manager	20 November 2024	10th	(Tunisia) Mourad Okbi	20 November 2024
MC Oran	(Algeria) Youcef Bouzidi	Sacked	5 October 2024	7th	(Mali) Éric Chelle	9 October 2024
CR Belouizdad	(France) Corentin Martins	Mutual consent	14 October 2024	13th	(Algeria) Abdelkader Amrani	16 October 2024
Paradou AC	(Tunisia) Radhi Jaïdi	Resigned	26 October 2024	15th	(Algeria) Billel Dziri	28 October 2024
USM Khenchela	(Tunisia) Hatem Missaoui	Sacked	30 October 2024	12th	(Algeria) Chérif Hadjar	11 November 2024
ES Mostaganem	(Algeria) Chérif Hadjar	Mutual consent	11 November 2024	9th	(Algeria) Slimane Raho	14 November 2024
MC El Bayadh	(Algeria) Fouad Bouali	Mutual consent	12 November 2024	15th	(Algeria) Lotfi Amrouche	14 November 2024
US Biskra	(Algeria) Mounir Zeghdoud	Mutual consent	19 November 2024	13th	(Algeria) Tahar Chérif El-Ouazzani	26 November 2024
Olympique Akbou	(Tunisia) Moez Bouakaz	Resigned	30 November 2024	6th	(Algeria) Mounir Zeghdoud	3 December 2024
MC Alger	(France) Patrice Beaumelle	Mutual consent	16 December 2024	6th	(Tunisia) Khaled Ben Yahia	17 December 2024
ES Mostaganem	(Algeria) Slimane Raho	Resigned	26 December 2024	15th	(Algeria) Nadir Leknaoui	30 December 2024
NC Magra	(Algeria) Lyamine Bougherara	Mutual consent	27 December 2024	13th	(Algeria) Fouad Bouali	12 January 2025
JS Kabylie	(Algeria) Abdelhak Benchikha	Resigned	3 January 2025	1st	(Germany) Josef Zinnbauer	20 January 2025
Olympique Akbou	(Algeria) Mounir Zeghdoud	Sacked	5 January 2025	11th	(France) Denis Lavagne	10 January 2025
MC Oran	(Mali) Éric Chelle	Resigned	12 January 2025	10th	(Algeria) Abdelkader Amrani	6 February 2025
US Biskra	(Algeria) Tahar Chérif El-Ouazzani	Resigned	10 January 2025	15th	(Algeria) Lyamine Bougherara	14 January 2025
ES Sétif	(Algeria) Rédha Bendris	Sacked	21 January 2025	4th	(Tunisia) Nabil Kouki	21 January 2025
CR Belouizdad	(Algeria) Abdelkader Amrani	Resigned	24 January 2025	6th	(Germany) Sead Ramović	5 February 2025
USM Alger	(Tunisia) Nabil Maâloul	Sacked	12 February 2025	3rd	(Brazil) Marcos Paquetá	14 February 2025
USM Khenchela	(Algeria) Chérif Hadjar	Resigned	18 February 2025	13th		

== Deaths ==
- 13 August 2024: Sid Ahmed Belkedrouci, 73, GC Mascara, MC Oran and USM Bel Abbès midfielder.
- 11 September 2024: Malick Touré, 28, US Biskra, MO Béjaïa and ES Sétif left winger.
- 13 September 2024: Mouloud Terzi, JS Kabylie.
- 15 October 2024: Belaïd Lacarne, 83, Former referee and president of the Algerian Football Federation.
- 29 October 2024: M’hamed Bouhella, 70, ASO Chlef forward.
- 8 November 2024: Rachid Mekhloufi, 88, former Algeria national football team player, coach and president of the Algerian Football Federation.
- 16 November 2024: Hamid Merakchi, 48, ES Mostaganem, MC Alger, WA Tlemcen, MC Oran, USM El Harrach and WA Mostaganem forward.
- 10 December 2024: Mahieddine Khalef, 80, JS Kabylie and NA Hussein Dey, former Algeria national football team coach.
- 12 December 2024: Youcef Bouzidi, 67, NA Hussein Dey, MO Béjaïa, US Biskra, JS Kabylie and MC Oran coach.
- 22 March 2025: Djamel Menad, 64, CR Belouizdad, JS Kabylie and USM Alger forward.
- 27 April 2025: Noureddine Hamiti, 82, CR Belouizdad midfielder.
