= Lehlohonolo Mtshali =

South African soccer player

Personal information
- Date of birth: 14 December 1994 (age 31)
- Height: 1.72 m (5 ft 8 in)
- Position: Defender

Team information
- Current team: Magesi
- Number: 26

Youth career
- Orlando Pirates

Senior career*
Years	Team	Apps	(Gls)
2017–2019	Orlando Pirates	2	(0)
2019–2022	Jomo Cosmos	55	(1)
2022–2023	All Stars	29	(1)
2023–2025	Sekhukhune United	16	(0)
2025–	Magesi	4	(1)
- * Club domestic league appearances and goals as of 10 February 2025

Lehlohonolo Mtshali (born 14 December 1994) is a South African soccer player who plays as a defender for Magesi in the South African Premier Division.

== Career ==
Mtshali played in the Diski Challenge for Orlando Pirates when he was given the chance for the first team in 2017. He made his first-tier debut in the 2017-18 South African Premier Division, as a defensive midfielder against Platinum Stars. He also represented South Africa U19 against a selection of European club teams, serving as team captain.

Mtshali did not break through at the Bucs, and in the spring of 2019 he signed for Jomo Cosmos in the National First Division. After playing the 2022–23 season for All Stars, he was rediscovered by a number of Premier Division clubs, one of which was said to be Orlando Pirates. He ended up joining Sekhukhune United. Here he was able to play continentally, in the 2023–24 CAF Confederation Cup group stage and the 2024–25 CAF Confederation Cup qualifying rounds.

In the winter window of 2025, Ntshali went on to Premier Division strugglers Magesi. He scored in Magesi's first win in 2025, over Cape Town City.

== Personal life ==
It was reported that Mtshali had a son.
