= Mohamed Ali Ben Salem =

Tunisian footballer

Personal information
- Full name: Mohamed Ali Ben Salem
- Date of birth: 6 January 1996 (age 30)
- Place of birth: Tunisia
- Height: 1.81 m (5 ft 11 in)
- Position: Centre-back

Team information
- Current team: AGMK

Youth career
- ES Tunis
- Club Africain

Senior career*
Years	Team	Apps	(Gls)
2015–2016	Club Africain	2	(0)
2016–2017	Olympique Béja	14	(2)
2017–2021	ES Métlaoui	73	(0)
2021–2022	Inhulets Petrove	23	(0)
2022	Chebba	6	(0)
2023–	AGMK		

International career^{‡}
2013	Tunisia U17	3	(0)
- * Club domestic league appearances and goals as of 17 November 2022 ‡ National team caps and goals as of 20 April 2021

Mohamed Ali Ben Salem (born 6 January 1996) is a Tunisian professional footballer who plays as a centre-back for Uzbekistan Premier League club AGMK.

== Club career ==
On 1 March 2021, he signed for Ukrainian Premier League club Inhulets Petrove.

== Career statistics ==
=== Club ===
As of match played 2 October 2021

Appearances and goals by club, season and competition
Club	Season	League			Cup		Continental		Other		Total	
Club	Season	Division	Apps	Goals	Apps	Goals	Apps	Goals	Apps	Goals	Apps	Goals
Club Africain	2015–16	Tunisian Ligue Professionnelle 1	2	0	0	0	0	0	0	0	2	0
Olympique Béja	2016–17	Tunisian Ligue Professionnelle 1	14	2	1	0	0	0	0	0	15	2
ES Métlaoui	2017–18	Tunisian Ligue Professionnelle 1	18	0	1	0	0	0	0	0	19	0
ES Métlaoui	2018–19	Tunisian Ligue Professionnelle 1	24	0	2	0	0	0	0	0	26	0
ES Métlaoui	2019–20	Tunisian Ligue Professionnelle 1	20	0	3	0	0	0	0	0	23	0
ES Métlaoui	2020–21	Tunisian Ligue Professionnelle 1	11	0	0	0	0	0	0	0	11	0
ES Métlaoui	Total		73	0	6	0	0	0	0	0	79	0
Inhulets Petrove	2020–21	Ukrainian Premier League	10	0	0	0	0	0	0	0	10	0
Inhulets Petrove	2021–22	Ukrainian Premier League	8	0	0	0	0	0	0	0	8	0
Inhulets Petrove	Total		18	0	0	0	0	0	0	0	18	0
Career total			107	2	7	0	0	0	0	0	114	2
