= 2024–25 Ligue Inter Régions =

Inter-Régions Division
- Season: 2024–25
- Promoted: West WA Tlemcen; Centre West JS Tixeraïne; Centre East MO Béjaïa; East NRB Beni Oulbane; South West CRB Adrar; South East CR Béni Thour
- Relegated: West ES Tighennif, Nasr Es Senia; Centre West HRB Fouka; Centre East IB Lakhdaria; East WA Zighoud Youcef; South West CRB Bougtob, JS Guir Abadla; South East NT Souf, UR Hamadine
- All statistics correct as of 28 September 2025.

The 2024–25 Ligue Inter Régions is the 62nd season of the Algerian Third Division since its establishment. The 2024–2025 Inter-Regions Championship season officially came to an end, revealing the six clubs promoted to the Amateur Ligue 2. These are MO Béjaïa, NR Beni Oulbane, JS Tixeraine, WA Tlemcen, CRB Adrar, and CR Béni Thour. Each of these clubs earned their promotion after a campaign that was as inspiring as it was competitive.

In the Centre-East group, MO Béjaïa left no room for doubt throughout the season. Mustapha Biskri’s men won their group from start to finish, logically securing their return to Ligue 2. Their discipline and collective strength were the cornerstones of a well-managed campaign. In the East group, the season’s biggest surprise came from NR Beni Oulbane, a team from the Skikda Province, founded in 1977. The club made history by securing promotion to Ligue 2 for the first time ever.

The Centre-West group delivered a thrilling finish. In a tightly contested race, JS Tixeraine clinched promotion thanks to a superior goal difference over CR Zaouia. The final sprint went in their favor, and May 23, will be remembered forever by the residents of Tixeraine, a neighborhood nestled between Birkhadem and Bir Mourad Raïs. In the West group, WA Tlemcen returned to Ligue 2 after a fierce battle with USM Bel Abbès. A crucial 2–1 victory against their direct rivals in the penultimate round made the difference, allowing the Zianides to secure their much-anticipated promotion.

In the South-West group, CRB Adrar was simply untouchable. The team dominated the championship from start to finish, asserting itself as a powerhouse throughout the season and earning promotion without contest. Lastly, in the South-East group, the competition was far more intense. CR Béni Thour had to fight until the final day to claim top spot, edging out NRB Touggourt by just a single point in a nail-biting conclusion to the season.

== Organization ==
The following football championships are respectively called.

a) The championship of the third division is called: Inter-regional football championship;

b) The championship of the fourth division is called: Regional one football championship;

c) The championship of the fifth division is called: Regional two football championship;

d) The championship of the sixth division is called: Honour football championship;

e) The championship of the seventh division is called: Pre-Honour football championship.

- Clubs must comply with the general conditions of participation established for their respective championship as set out in these provisions.
- Clubs that do not meet the conditions set may be excluded from participation in the competitions.
- The decision to exclude is taken by the League Office in accordance with the regulations.

== League table ==
=== West ===
Pos	Team	Pld	W	D	L	GF	GA	GD	Pts	Promotion or relegation
1	WA Tlemcen (C, P)	30	26	2	2	83	15	+68	79 (Note: WA Tlemcen were deducted 1 points)	Ligue 2
2	USM Bel Abbès	30	25	3	2	71	9	+62	78	
3	RC Relizane	30	19	4	7	51	26	+25	60 (Note: RC Relizane were deducted 1 points)	
4	IRB El Kerma	30	16	3	11	49	42	+7	49 (Note: IRB El Kerma were deducted 2 points)	
5	O Sidi Ben Adda	30	15	4	11	37	31	+6	49	
6	IS Tighennif	30	13	6	11	38	28	+10	42 (Note: IS Tighennif were deducted 3 points)	
7	IR Bouhenni Tiaret	30	13	5	12	36	34	+2	41 (Note: IR Bouhenni Tiaret were deducted 3 points)	
8	JS Bendaoud	30	12	5	13	39	42	−3	41	
9	US Remchi	30	12	2	16	33	30	+3	36 (Note: US Remchi were deducted 2 points)	
10	FCB Telagh	30	12	2	16	41	41	0	36 (Note: FCB Telagh were deducted 2 points)	
11	CAS Abdelmoumen	30	11	5	14	34	44	−10	36 (Note: CA Sidi Abdelmoumen were deducted 2 points)	
12	SCM Oran	30	7	13	10	40	29	+11	34	
13	ICS Tlemcen	30	9	4	17	40	50	−10	28 (Note: IC Sidi Said Tlemcen were deducted 3 points)	
14	JS Emir Abdelkader	30	8	6	16	36	56	−20	28 (Note: JS Emir Abdelkader were deducted 2 points)	Qualification for the Relegation play-off
15	ES Tighennif (R)	30	6	4	20	24	88	−64	13 (Note: ES Tighennif were deducted 9 points)	Relegation to Ligue Régional I
16	Nasr Es Senia (R)	30	0	4	26	18	105	−87	−30 (Note: Nasr Es Senia were deducted 34 points)	Relegation to Ligue Régional I

Updated to match(es) played on 29 May 2025. Source: lnf-amateur.dz
Rules for classification: 1) points; 2) head-to-head points; 3) head-to-head goal difference; 4) goal difference; 5) total goals; 6) fairplay ranking; 7) playoff.
(C) Champions; (P) Promoted; (R) Relegated

=== Centre West ===
Pos	Team	Pld	W	D	L	GF	GA	GD	Pts	Promotion or relegation
1	JS Tixeraïne (C, P)	30	18	8	4	42	14	+28	62	Ligue 2
2	CR Zaouia	30	17	11	2	48	17	+31	62	
3	CRB Beni Tamou	30	16	8	6	48	24	+24	53 (Note: CRB Beni Tamou were deducted 3 points)	
4	WAB Tissemsilt	30	16	4	10	48	27	+21	50 (Note: WAB Tissemsilt were deducted 2 points)	
5	USM Blida	30	14	10	6	43	23	+20	50 (Note: USM Blida were deducted 2 points)	
6	CRB Aïn Oussara	30	11	7	12	40	35	+5	39 (Note: CRB Aïn Oussara were deducted 1 points)	
7	ORB Oued Fodda	30	10	8	12	29	39	−10	38	
8	JS Haï Djabel	30	13	3	14	26	35	−9	37 (Note: JS Haï Djabel were deducted 5 points)	
9	Olympique de Médéa	30	10	6	14	34	43	−9	36	
10	WA Boufarik	30	8	11	11	27	33	−6	35	
11	MS Cherchell	30	8	10	12	28	41	−13	34	
12	WB Meftah	30	9	6	15	34	45	−11	33	
13	CB Beni Slimane	30	6	12	12	27	39	−12	30	
14	RA Ain Defla	30	8	5	17	21	50	−29	29	Qualification for the Relegation play-off
15	IRB Sougueur	30	8	6	16	23	44	−21	29 (Note: IRB Sougueur were deducted 1 points)	Qualification for the Relegation play-off
16	HRB Fouka (R)	28	6	5	17	29	38	−9	23	Relegation to Ligue Régional I

Updated to match(es) played on 29 May 2025. Source: lnf-amateur.dz
Rules for classification: 1) points; 2) head-to-head points; 3) head-to-head goal difference; 4) goal difference; 5) total goals; 6) fairplay ranking; 7) playoff.
(C) Champions; (P) Promoted; (R) Relegated

=== Centre East ===
Pos	Team	Pld	W	D	L	GF	GA	GD	Pts	Promotion or relegation
1	MO Béjaïa (C, P)	30	20	9	1	49	14	+35	69	Ligue 2
2	JS Boumerdes	30	18	7	5	38	19	+19	61	
3	AB Barika	30	14	8	8	40	26	+14	49 (Note: AB Barika were deducted 1 points)	
4	JS Azazga	30	13	6	11	30	27	+3	45	
5	RC Bougaa	30	12	8	10	42	36	+6	44	
6	JSM Béjaïa	30	11	10	9	42	33	+9	42 (Note: JSM Béjaïa were deducted 1 points)	
7	A El Eulma	30	10	8	12	29	28	+1	37 (Note: A El Eulma were deducted 1 points)	
8	MC El Eulma	30	10	8	12	30	31	−1	37 (Note: MC El Eulma were deducted 1 points)	
9	USB Berhoum	30	10	7	13	30	38	−8	37	
10	MB Barika	30	10	6	14	32	34	−2	36	
11	A Bou Saada	30	11	5	14	22	31	−9	36 (Note: A Bou Saada were deducted 2 points)	
12	USM Sétif	30	9	7	14	36	39	−3	34	
13	E Sour El Ghozlane	30	8	10	12	24	34	−10	34	
14	AS Bordj Ghedir	30	9	6	15	29	41	−12	33	Qualification for the Relegation play-off
15	ES Bouakeul	30	9	6	15	35	52	−17	33	Qualification for the Relegation play-off
16	IB Lakhdaria (R)	30	9	3	18	26	51	−25	30	Relegation to Ligue Régional I

Updated to match(es) played on 29 May 2025. Source: lnf-amateur.dz
Rules for classification: 1) points; 2) head-to-head points; 3) head-to-head goal difference; 4) goal difference; 5) total goals; 6) fairplay ranking; 7) playoff.
(C) Champions; (P) Promoted; (R) Relegated

=== East ===
Pos	Team	Pld	W	D	L	GF	GA	GD	Pts	Promotion or relegation
1	NRB Beni Oulbane (C, P)	30	20	7	3	45	18	+27	67	Ligue 2
2	ES Guelma	30	17	9	4	43	12	+31	60	
3	US Faubourg Constantine	30	16	6	8	43	21	+22	54	
4	AS Aïn M'lila	30	15	6	9	43	31	+12	49 (Note: AS Aïn M'lila were deducted 2 points)	
5	JSM Skikda	30	14	7	9	40	31	+9	47 (Note: JSM Skikda were deducted 2 points)	
6	CB Mila	30	12	8	10	38	29	+9	44	
7	IRB Sedrata	30	13	3	14	41	35	+6	41 (Note: IRB Sedrata were deducted 1 points)	
8	Nasr El Fedjoudj	30	10	9	11	35	35	0	39	
9	NRC Boudjelbana	30	11	5	14	40	44	−4	36 (Note: NRC Boudjelbana were deducted 2 points)	
10	JB Aïn Kercha	30	9	10	11	38	42	−4	36 (Note: JB Aïn Kercha were deducted 1 points)	
11	US Tébessa	30	11	5	14	32	50	−18	36 (Note: US Tébessa were deducted 2 points)	
12	NRB Tazouguert	30	10	4	16	36	47	−11	34	
13	US Boukhadra	30	8	11	11	30	29	+1	33 (Note: US Boukhadra were deducted 2 points)	
14	CRB Aïn Yagout	30	9	5	16	29	41	−12	32 (Note: CRB Aïn Yagout were deducted 1 points)	Qualification for the Relegation play-off
15	CRB Aïn Fakroun	30	8	5	17	26	45	−19	28 (Note: CRB Aïn Fakroun were deducted 1 points)	Qualification for the Relegation play-off
16	WA Zighoud Youcef (R)	30	4	6	20	20	68	−48	12 (Note: WA Zighoud Youcef were deducted 6 points)	Relegation to Ligue Régional I

Updated to match(es) played on 29 May 2024. Source: lnf-amateur.dz
Rules for classification: 1) points; 2) head-to-head points; 3) head-to-head goal difference; 4) goal difference; 5) total goals; 6) fairplay ranking; 7) playoff.
(C) Champions; (P) Promoted; (R) Relegated

=== South West ===
Pos	Team	Pld	W	D	L	GF	GA	GD	Pts	Promotion or relegation
1	A Aïn Sefra	0	0	0	0	0	0	0	0	Ligue 2
2	CRB Adrar	0	0	0	0	0	0	0	0	
3	CRB Bougtob	0	0	0	0	0	0	0	0	
4	CRB Tindouf	0	0	0	0	0	0	0	0	
5	IR Makmen Ben Amar	0	0	0	0	0	0	0	0	
6	IR Mecheria	0	0	0	0	0	0	0	0	
7	JRB Taghit	0	0	0	0	0	0	0	0	
8	JS Guir Abadla	0	0	0	0	0	0	0	0	
9	MC Ghassoul	0	0	0	0	0	0	0	0	
10	MC El Abiodh Sidi Cheikh	0	0	0	0	0	0	0	0	
11	MC Zaouia Hinoun Aoulef	0	0	0	0	0	0	0	0	
12	NRB Fenoughil	0	0	0	0	0	0	0	0	
13	NRB Sbaa	0	0	0	0	0	0	0	0	
14	NRC Hattaba Adrar	0	0	0	0	0	0	0	0	Qualification for the Relegation play-off
15	US Naâma	0	0	0	0	0	0	0	0	Relegation to Ligue Régional I
16	USM Tindouf	0	0	0	0	0	0	0	0	Relegation to Ligue Régional I

Updated to match(es) played on 1 June 2024. Source: lnf-amateur.dz
Rules for classification: 1) points; 2) head-to-head points; 3) head-to-head goal difference; 4) goal difference; 5) total goals; 6) fairplay ranking; 7) playoff.

=== South East ===
Pos	Team	Pld	W	D	L	GF	GA	GD	Pts	Promotion or relegation
1	ASB Metlili Châamba	0	0	0	0	0	0	0	0	Ligue 2
2	CRB Djemaa	0	0	0	0	0	0	0	0	
3	CR Béni Thour	0	0	0	0	0	0	0	0	
4	CSSW Illizi	0	0	0	0	0	0	0	0	
5	IRB Kheneg	0	0	0	0	0	0	0	0	
6	IB Laghouat	0	0	0	0	0	0	0	0	
7	IRB Nezla	0	0	0	0	0	0	0	0	
8	IRB Robbah	0	0	0	0	0	0	0	0	
9	IRB Zaouia El Abidia	0	0	0	0	0	0	0	0	
10	MB Hassi Messaoud	0	0	0	0	0	0	0	0	
11	NRB Touggourt	0	0	0	0	0	0	0	0	
12	NT Souf	0	0	0	0	0	0	0	0	
13	Olympique El Oued	0	0	0	0	0	0	0	0	
14	TR Tigdidine	0	0	0	0	0	0	0	0	Qualification for the Relegation play-off
15	UR Hamadine	0	0	0	0	0	0	0	0	Relegation to Ligue Régional I
16	USB Hassi R'mel	0	0	0	0	0	0	0	0	Relegation to Ligue Régional I

Updated to match(es) played on 1 June 2024. Source: lnf-amateur.dz
Rules for classification: 1) points; 2) head-to-head points; 3) head-to-head goal difference; 4) goal difference; 5) total goals; 6) fairplay ranking; 7) playoff.
