= 2024–25 CAF Confederation Cup qualifying rounds =

International football competition in Africa

- Dates: 16 August – 22 September 2024

Tournament statistics
- Matches played: 72
- Goals scored: 154 (2.14 per match)

The 2024–25 CAF Confederation Cup qualifying rounds began on 16 August and ended on 22 September 2024. 52 football teams competed in the qualifying rounds to decide the 16 places in the group stage of the 2024–25 CAF Confederation Cup.

All times are local.

== Draw ==
The draw for the qualifying rounds was held on 11 July 2024, 12:00 GMT (15:00 local time, UTC+3), at the CAF headquarters in Cairo, Egypt.

The entry round of the 52 teams entered into the draw was determined by their performances in the CAF competitions for the previous five seasons (CAF 5-year ranking points shown in parentheses).

Entry round	Second round (12 teams)	First round (40 teams)
Teams	(Egypt) Zamalek (48 pts); (Morocco) RS Berkane (42 pts); (Tanzania) Simba (39 pts); (Algeria) USM Alger (36 pts); (Ivory Coast) ASEC Mimosas (30 pts); (Democratic Republic of the Congo) AS Vita Club (9 pts); (Egypt) Al Masry (8 pts); (Mali) Stade Malien (8 pts); (Tunisia) CS Sfaxien (7 pts); (Nigeria) Enyimba (6 pts); (South Africa) Sekhukhune United (5 pts); (Democratic Republic of the Congo) Saint-Éloi Lupopo (4 pts)	(Libya) Al Ahli Tripoli (9 pts) (Note: Libyan teams were listed as Libya 1 and Libya 2 during the draw; as their identity was still unknown by the time of the draw.); (Libya) Al Hilal Benghazi (5 pts); (Senegal) ASC Jaraaf (4 pts); (Republic of the Congo) AS Otohô (3 pts); (Zambia) ZESCO United (1 pt); (Algeria) CS Constantine; (Angola) Bravos do Maquis; (Angola) Desportivo da LS; (Benin) Dadje; (Botswana) Orapa United; (Burkina Faso) Étoile Filante (Note: The identity of the team was not known in the draw; as the Coupe du Faso was postponed and the Burkinabé representative was yet to be determined by the time of the draw.); (Burundi) Rukinzo; (Cameroon) Fovu Club; (Chad) Elect Sport; (Comoros) Alizé Fort; (Equatorial Guinea) 15 de Agosto; (Eswatini) Nsingizini Hotspurs; (Ethiopia) Ethiopian Coffee; (Ghana) Nsoatreman; (Guinea) Hafia; (Ivory Coast) RC Abidjan; (Kenya) Administration Police; (Liberia) Watanga; (Madagascar) Elgeco Plus; (Morocco) Union de Touarga; (Mozambique) Black Bulls; (Niger) AS FAN; (Nigeria) El Kanemi Warriors; (Rwanda) Police FC; (Seychelles) Foresters; (Sierra Leone) East End Lions; (Somalia) Horseed; (South Africa) Stellenbosch; (South Sudan) Jamus; (Tanzania) Coastal Union; (Togo) ASC Kara; (Tunisia) Stade Tunisien; (Uganda) Kitara; (Zanzibar) Uhamiaji; (Zimbabwe) Dynamos

== Format ==
In the qualifying rounds, each tie was played on a home-and-away two-legged basis. If the aggregate score was tied after the second leg, the away goals rule was applied, and if still tied, extra time was not played, and a penalty shoot-out was used to determine the winner (Regulations III. 13 & 14).

== Schedule ==
The schedule of the competition was as follows.

Schedule for the 2024–25 CAF Confederation Cup qualifying rounds
Round	Draw date	First leg	Second leg
First round	11 July 2024	16–18 August 2024	23–25 August 2024
Second round	11 July 2024	13–15 September 2024	20–22 September 2024

== Bracket ==
The bracket of the draw was announced by the CAF on 11 July 2024. The 16 winners of the second round advanced to the group stage.

First round					Second round
1	(Nigeria) El Kanemi Warriors	1	1	2
4	(Benin) Dadje	1	2	3
4	(Benin) Dadje	1	2	3	(Benin) Dadje	0	0	0
					(Morocco) RS Berkane	2	5	7

First round					Second round
1	(Togo) ASC Kara	2	2	4
4	(Niger) AS FAN	2	0	2
4	(Niger) AS FAN	2	0	2	(Togo) ASC Kara	2	0	2
					(Ivory Coast) ASEC Mimosas	1	2	3

First round					Second round
1	(Liberia) Paynesville	4	1	5
4	(Cameroon) Fovu Club	0	0	0
4	(Cameroon) Fovu Club	0	0	0	(Liberia) Paynesville	1	1	2
					(Mali) Stade Malien	0	3	3

First round					Second round
1	(Guinea) Hafia	1	0	1
4	(Burkina Faso) Étoile Filante (a)	1	0	1
4	(Burkina Faso) Étoile Filante (a)	1	0	1	(Burkina Faso) Étoile Filante	0	0	0 (2)
					(Nigeria) Enyimba (p)	0	0	0 (3)

First round
1	(Morocco) Union de Touarga	0	0	0 (1)
4	(Ivory Coast) RC Abidjan (p)	0	0	0 (2)
3	(Sierra Leone) East End Lions	0	0	0
2	(Senegal) ASC Jaraaf	1	3	4

Second round
(Ivory Coast) RC Abidjan	0	0	0
(Senegal) ASC Jaraaf	0	3	3

First round					Second round
1	(Kenya) Administration Police	0	1	1
4	(Ethiopia) Ethiopian Coffee	0	0	0
4	(Ethiopia) Ethiopian Coffee	0	0	0	(Kenya) Administration Police	0	1	1
					(Egypt) Zamalek	1	2	3

First round					Second round
1	(South Sudan) Jamus	0	0	0
4	(Tunisia) Stade Tunisien	1	4	5
4	(Tunisia) Stade Tunisien	1	4	5	(Tunisia) Stade Tunisien	1	0	1
					(Algeria) USM Alger	0	2	2

First round					Second round
1	(Zanzibar) Uhamiaji	0	1	1
4	(Libya) Al Ahli Tripoli	2	3	5
4	(Libya) Al Ahli Tripoli	2	3	5	(Libya) Al Ahli Tripoli	0	1	1
					(Tanzania) Simba	0	3	3

First round					Second round
1	(Uganda) Kitara	2	2	4
4	(Libya) Al Hilal Benghazi	3	3	6
4	(Libya) Al Hilal Benghazi	3	3	6	(Libya) Al Hilal Benghazi	3	2	5 (3)
					(Egypt) Al Masry	2	3	5 (5)

First round					Second round
1	(Somalia) Horseed	0	0	0
4	(Burundi) Rukinzo	0	2	2
4	(Burundi) Rukinzo	0	2	2	(Burundi) Rukinzo	0	0	0
					(Tunisia) CS Sfaxien	1	1	2

First round					Second round
1	(Eswatini) Nsingizini Hotspurs	0	0	0
4	(South Africa) Stellenbosch	3	5	8
4	(South Africa) Stellenbosch	3	5	8	(South Africa) Stellenbosch	2	1	3
					(Democratic Republic of the Congo) AS Vita Club	0	1	1

First round					Second round
1	(Madagascar) Elgeco Plus	1	0	1
4	(Angola) Desportivo da LS (a)	1	0	1
4	(Angola) Desportivo da LS (a)	1	0	1	(Angola) Desportivo da LS (a)	1	1	2
					(South Africa) Sekhukhune United	0	2	2

First round					Second round
1	(Angola) Bravos do Maquis	3	0	3
4	(Tanzania) Coastal Union	0	0	0
4	(Tanzania) Coastal Union	0	0	0	(Angola) Bravos do Maquis	1	2	3
					(Democratic Republic of the Congo) Saint-Éloi Lupopo	0	1	1

First round
1	(Comoros) Alizé Fort	0	0	0
4	(Mozambique) Black Bulls	7	4	11
3	(Equatorial Guinea) 15 de Agosto	0	1	1
2	(Republic of the Congo) AS Otohô	2	2	4

Second round
(Mozambique) Black Bulls (a)	1	1	1
(Republic of the Congo) AS Otohô	0	2	2

First round
1	(Seychelles) Foresters	1	0	1
4	(Botswana) Orapa United	1	2	3
3	(Zimbabwe) Dynamos	1	0	1
2	(Zambia) ZESCO United	0	0	0

Second round
(Botswana) Orapa United	0	1	1 (3)
(Zimbabwe) Dynamos	1	0	1 (1)

First round
1	(Ghana) Nsoatreman	3	2	5
4	(Chad) Elect Sport	0	0	0
3	(Algeria) CS Constantine	2	2	4
2	(Rwanda) Police FC	0	1	1

Second round
(Ghana) Nsoatreman	0	0	0
(Algeria) CS Constantine	2	1	3

== First round ==
The first round, also called the first preliminary round, included the 40 teams that did not receive byes to the second round.

Team 1	Agg.	Team 2	1st leg	2nd leg
El Kanemi Warriors (Nigeria)	2–3	(Benin) Dadje	1–1	1–2
ASC Kara (Togo)	4–2	(Niger) AS FAN	2–2	2–0
Paynesville (Liberia)	5–0	(Cameroon) Fovu Club	4–0	1–0
Hafia (Guinea)	1–1 (a)	(Burkina Faso) Étoile Filante	1–1	0–0
Union de Touarga (Morocco)	0–0 (1–2 p)	(Ivory Coast) RC Abidjan	0–0	0–0
East End Lions (Sierra Leone)	0–4	(Senegal) ASC Jaraaf	0–1	0–3
Administration Police (Kenya)	1–0	(Ethiopia) Ethiopian Coffee	0–0	1–0
Jamus (South Sudan)	0–5	(Tunisia) Stade Tunisien	0–1	0–4
Uhamiaji (Zanzibar)	1–5	(Libya) Al Ahli Tripoli	0–2	1–3
Kitara (Uganda)	4–6	(Libya) Al Hilal Benghazi	2–3	2–3
Horseed (Somalia)	0–2	(Burundi) Rukinzo	0–0	0–2
Nsingizini Hotspurs (Eswatini)	0–8	(South Africa) Stellenbosch	0–3	0–5
Elgeco Plus (Madagascar)	1–1 (a)	(Angola) Desportivo da LS	1–1	0–0
Bravos do Maquis (Angola)	3–0	(Tanzania) Coastal Union	3–0	0–0
Alizé Fort (Comoros)	0–11	(Mozambique) Black Bulls	0–7	0–4
15 de Agosto (Equatorial Guinea)	1–4	(Republic of the Congo) AS Otohô	0–2	1–2
Foresters (Seychelles)	1–3	(Botswana) Orapa United	1–1	0–2
Dynamos (Zimbabwe)	1–0	(Zambia) ZESCO United	1–0	0–0
Nsoatreman (Ghana)	5–0	(Chad) Elect Sport	3–0	2–0
CS Constantine (Algeria)	4–1	(Rwanda) Police FC	2–0	2–1

17 August 2024
16:00 UTC+1

El Kanemi Warriors (Nigeria)	1–1	(Benin) Dadje
Ajiji 90'	Report	Salassi 29'

Remo Stars Stadium, Sagamu
24 August 2024
16:00 UTC+1

Dadje (Benin)	2–1	(Nigeria) El Kanemi Warriors
Bakai 30' (pen.), 82'	Report	Naantaum 37'

Stade de l'Amitié, Cotonou
Referee: Younoussa Tawel Camara (Guinea)

Dadje won 3–2 on aggregate.

18 August 2024
16:00 UTC+0

ASC Kara (Togo)	2–2	(Niger) AS FAN
Akoro 5', 50'	Report	Addae 31' (pen.), 86'

Stade de Kégué, Lomé
Referee: Abdoul Karim Twagiramukiza (Rwanda)
25 August 2024
16:00 UTC+1

AS FAN (Niger)	0–2	(Togo) ASC Kara
	Report	Akoro 60'; Marone 75'

Stade Général Seyni Kountché, Niamey
Referee: Haileyesus Bazezew (Ethiopia)

ASC Kara won 4–2 on aggregate.

18 August 2024
16:00 UTC+0

Paynesville (Liberia)	4–0	(Cameroon) Fovu Club
Paye 33', 45'; Kumeh 65'; Dan Weah 83'	Report

SKD Stadium, Monrovia
Referee: Reginald Collins Amoah (Ghana)
25 August 2024
15:00 UTC+1

Fovu Club (Cameroon)	0–1	(Liberia) Paynesville
	Report	Paye 47'

Ahmadou Ahidjo Stadium, Yaoundé
Referee: Hamza El Fareq (Morocco)

Paynesville won 5–0 on aggregate.

18 August 2024
16:00 UTC+0

Hafia (Guinea)	1–1	(Burkina Faso) Étoile Filante
	Report

Stade du 26 Mars, Bamako (Mali)
23 August 2024
16:00 UTC+0

Étoile Filante (Burkina Faso)	0–0	(Guinea) Hafia
	Report

Stade du 26 Mars, Bamako (Mali)
Referee: Josy Roselin Mezui Abaa (Gabon)

1–1 on aggregate. Étoile Filante won on away goals.

17 August 2024
21:00 UTC+1

Union de Touarga (Morocco)	0–0	(Ivory Coast) RC Abidjan
	Report

Moulay Hassan Stadium, Rabat
24 August 2024
16:00 UTC+0

RC Abidjan (Ivory Coast)	0–0	(Morocco) Union de Touarga
	Report
Penalties
	2–1

Felix Houphouet Boigny Stadium, Abidjan
Referee: Soulaimane Ansudane (Comoros)

0–0 on aggregate. RC Abidjan won 2–1 on penalties.

18 August 2024
16:00 UTC+0

East End Lions (Sierra Leone)	0–1	(Senegal) ASC Jaraaf
	Report	Dione 77'

Bo Stadium, Bo
25 August 2024
17:00 UTC+0

ASC Jaraaf (Senegal)	3–0	(Sierra Leone) East End Lions
	Report

Stade Lat-Dior, Thiès

ASC Jaraaf won 4–0 on aggregate.

18 August 2024
15:00 UTC+3

Administration Police (Kenya)	0–0	(Ethiopia) Ethiopian Coffee
	Report

Nyayo National Stadium, Nairobi
Referee: Masangune Louis Mwamba (DR Congo)
25 August 2024
15:00 UTC+3

Ethiopian Coffee (Ethiopia)	0–1	(Kenya) Administration Police
	Report	Toha 20'

Abebe Bikila Stadium, Addis Ababa

Administration Police won 1–0 on aggregate.

16 August 2024
15:00 UTC+2

Jamus (South Sudan)	0–1	(Tunisia) Stade Tunisien
	Report	Ouattara 56'

Juba Stadium, Juba
Referee: Issa Mouhamed (Benin)
24 August 2024
19:00 UTC+1

Stade Tunisien (Tunisia)	4–0	(South Sudan) Jamus
Ferchichi 10'; Oumarou 38'; Berrima 51'; Beji 75'	Report

Hammadi Agrebi Stadium, Tunis

Stade Tunisien won 5–0 on aggregate.

18 August 2024
19:00 UTC+2

Uhamiaji (Zanzibar)	0–2	(Libya) Al Ahli Tripoli
	Report	Taifour 2'; Ekrawa 80'

Tripoli Stadium, Tripoli (Libya)
23 August 2024
20:00 UTC+2

Al Ahli Tripoli (Libya)	3–1	(Zanzibar) Uhamiaji
Krawa'a 1', 48'; Taifour 90'	Report	Salmini 67'

Tripoli Stadium, Tripoli
Referee: Merveil Melvin Mandekouzou-Vendafara (Central African Republic)

Al Ahli Tripoli won 5–1 on aggregate.

16 August 2024
19:00 UTC+2

Kitara (Uganda)	2–3	(Libya) Al Hilal Benghazi
Aheebwa 59'; Omedi 80'	Report	Shaban 5'; Makari 18'; Al Badri 63' (pen.)

Benina Martyrs Stadium, Benghazi (Libya)
Referee: Babacar Sarr (Mauritania)
23 August 2024
19:00 UTC+2

Al Hilal Benghazi (Libya)	3–2	(Uganda) Kitara
Ben Salem 41'; Tanjy 59', 75'	Report	Ssematimba 57'; Omedi 81'

Benina Martyrs Stadium, Benghazi
Referee: Wilson Muianga (Mozambique)

Al Hilal Benghazi won 6–4 on aggregate.

16 August 2024
21:00 UTC+3

Horseed (Somalia)	0–0	(Burundi) Rukinzo
	Report

Azam Complex Stadium, Dar es Salaam (Tanzania)
Referee: Fabrice Senyo (Togo)
23 August 2024
16:00 UTC+3

Rukinzo (Burundi)	2–0	(Somalia) Horseed
Harerimana 12'; Bigirimana 30'	Report

Azam Complex Stadium, Dar es Salaam (Tanzania)
Referee: Mahmoud Nagy (Egypt)

Rukinzo won 2–0 on aggregate.

17 August 2024
15:00 UTC+2

Nsingizini Hotspurs (Eswatini)	0–3	(South Africa) Stellenbosch
	Report	De Jong 36'; Titus 43'; Basadien 70' (pen.)

Moses Mabhida Stadium, Durban (South Africa)
Referee: Dickens Nyagrowa (Kenya)
24 August 2024
15:00 UTC+2

Stellenbosch (South Africa)	5–0	(Eswatini) Nsingizini Hotspurs
Mojela 10'; Phili 27'; De Jong 51'; Mdaka 85'; Boji 89'	Report

Athlone Stadium, Cape Town
Referee: Yosri Bouali (Tunisia)

Stellenbosch won 8–0 on aggregate.

21 August 2024
15:00 UTC+1

Elgeco Plus (Madagascar)	1–1	(Angola) Desportivo da LS
Rafenoarisoa 16'	Report	Robson 58'

Estádio 11 de Novembro, Luanda (Angola)
Referee: Nasir Salum Siyah (Tanzania)
25 August 2024
15:30 UTC+1

Desportivo LS (Angola)	0–0	(Madagascar) Elgeco Plus
	Report

Estádio 11 de Novembro, Luanda
Referee: Abdelkerim Ousmane (Chad)

1–1 on aggregate. Desportivo LS won on away goals.

17 August 2024
16:00 UTC+1

Bravos do Maquis (Angola)	3–0	(Tanzania) Coastal Union
Paciência 22'; Matoco 45'; Manico 81'	Report

Estádio Nacional da Tundavala, Lubango
Referee: Abdulbasit Shuhoub (Libya)
25 August 2024
16:00 UTC+3

Coastal Union (Tanzania)	0–0	(Angola) Bravos do Maquis
	Report

Azam Complex Stadium, Dar es Salaam (Tanzania)

Bravos do Maquis won 3–0 on aggregate.

17 August 2024
16:00 UTC+2

Alizé Fort (Comoros)	0–7	(Mozambique) Black Bulls
	Report	Jeleel 3'; Seameh 13'; Vitinho 36'; Danilo 62'; Chamito 79'; Abubakar 81'; Ifoni 82'

Campo da ABB, Maputo (Mozambique)
24 August 2024
15:00 UTC+2

Black Bulls (Mozambique)	4–0	(Comoros) Alizé Fort
Vitinho 25' (pen.); Fidel 41'; Abubakar 47'; Kélvio 73'	Report

Campo da ABB, Maputo
Referee: Tuoniféré Soro (Ivory Coast)

Black Bulls won 11–0 on aggregate.

25 August 2024
15:00 UTC+1

15 de Agosto (Equatorial Guinea)	0–2	(Republic of the Congo) AS Otohô
	Report

Stade Alphonse Massemba-Débat, Brazzaville (Congo)
28 August 2024
15:30 UTC+1

AS Otohô (Republic of the Congo)	2–1	(Equatorial Guinea) 15 de Agosto
Baze Ibata 45' (pen.); Ndecket 60'	Report	Oba 35'

Stade Alphonse Massemba-Débat, Brazzaville
Referee: Amin Omar (Egypt)

AS Otohô won 4–1 on aggregate.

17 August 2024
15:00 UTC+4

Foresters (Seychelles)	1–1	(Botswana) Orapa United
Adeyeri 86'	Report	Sekwai 70'

Stade de Cote d'Or, Saint Pierre (Mauritius)
Referee: Auladyo Dos Santos Pariz (São Tomé and Príncipe)
25 August 2024
16:00 UTC+2

Orapa United (Botswana)	2–0	(Seychelles) Foresters
Kamberipa 14'; Thayanyane 52'	Report

Obed Itani Chilume Stadium, Francistown

Orapa United won 3–1 on aggregate.

18 August 2024
15:00 UTC+2

Dynamos (Zimbabwe)	1–0	(Zambia) ZESCO United
Shandirwa 31'	Report

Botswana National Stadium, Gaborone (Botswana)
Referee: Raimundo Correia (Guinea-Bissau)
24 August 2024
15:00 UTC+2

ZESCO United (Zambia)	0–0	(Zimbabwe) Dynamos
	Report

Levy Mwanawasa Stadium, Ndola

Dynamos won 1–0 on aggregate.

18 August 2024
15:00 UTC+0

Nsoatreman (Ghana)	3–0	(Chad) Elect Sport
Abdul Rahaman 30', 36'; Adu Meider 33'	Report

Accra Sports Stadium, Accra
Referee: Hicham Tamsamani (Morocco)
24 August 2024
15:00 UTC+1

Elect Sport (Chad)	0–2	(Ghana) Nsoatreman
	Report	Neymar 31'; Diyou 81'

Ahmadou Ahidjo Stadium, Yaoundé (Cameroon)
Referee: Lebalang Martin Mokete (Lesotho)

Nsoatreman won 5–0 on aggregate.

17 August 2024
19:00 UTC+1

CS Constantine (Algeria)	2–0	(Rwanda) Police FC
Dib 45' (pen.); Omoyele 78'	Report

Chahid Hamlaoui Stadium, Constantine
Referee: Daouda Guèye (Senegal)
25 August 2024
15:00 UTC+2

Police FC (Rwanda)	1–2	(Algeria) CS Constantine
Ani 19'	Report	Benchaa 41'; Temine 60'

Kigali Pelé Stadium, Kigali

CS Constantine won 4–1 on aggregate.

== Second round ==
The second round, also called the second preliminary round, included 32 teams: the 12 teams that received byes to this round, and the 20 winners of the first round.

Team 1	Agg.	Team 2	1st leg	2nd leg
Dadje (Benin)	0–7	(Morocco) RS Berkane	0–2	0–5
ASC Kara (Togo)	2–3	(Ivory Coast) ASEC Mimosas	2–1	0–2
Paynesville (Liberia)	2–3	(Mali) Stade Malien	1–0	1–3
Étoile Filante (Burkina Faso)	0–0 (2–3 p)	(Nigeria) Enyimba	0–0	0–0
RC Abidjan (Ivory Coast)	0–3	(Senegal) ASC Jaraaf	0–0	0–3
Administration Police (Kenya)	1–3	(Egypt) Zamalek	0–1	1–2
Stade Tunisien (Tunisia)	1–2	(Algeria) USM Alger	1–0	0–2
Al Ahli Tripoli (Libya)	1–3	(Tanzania) Simba	0–0	1–3
Al Hilal Benghazi (Libya)	5–5 (3–5 p)	(Egypt) Al Masry	3–2	2–3
Rukinzo (Burundi)	0–2	(Tunisia) CS Sfaxien	0–1	0–1
Stellenbosch (South Africa)	3–1	(Democratic Republic of the Congo) AS Vita Club	2–0	1–1
Desportivo da LS (Angola)	2–2 (a)	(South Africa) Sekhukhune United	1–0	1–2
Bravos do Maquis (Angola)	3–1	(Democratic Republic of the Congo) Saint-Éloi Lupopo	1–0	2–1
Black Bulls (Mozambique)	2–2 (a)	(Republic of the Congo) AS Otohô	1–0	1–2
Orapa United (Botswana)	1–1 (3–1 p)	(Zimbabwe) Dynamos	0–1	1–0
Nsoatreman (Ghana)	0–3	(Algeria) CS Constantine	0–2	0–1

14 September 2024
16:00 UTC+1

Dadje (Benin)	0–2	(Morocco) RS Berkane
	Report	Bassène 56'; Khairi 90'

Stade de l'Amitié, Cotonou
Referee: Andre Kolissala Mbangui (Central African Republic)
20 September 2024
20:00 UTC+1

RS Berkane (Morocco)	5–0	(Benin) Dadje
Manaout 16'; Santos 25'; Khairi 42'; Dayo 55' (pen.); Lamlioui 90+6' (pen.)	Report

Berkane Municipal Stadium, Berkane
Referee: Andofetra Rakotojaona (Madagascar)

RS Berkane won 7–0 on aggregate.

15 September 2024
16:00 UTC+0

ASC Kara (Togo)	2–1	(Ivory Coast) ASEC Mimosas
Agbetogon 56'; Akoro 60'	Report	Cissé 90+4'

Stade de Kégué, Lomé
Referee: Issa Mouhamed (Benin)
22 September 2024
16:00 UTC+0

ASEC Mimosas (Ivory Coast)	2–0	(Togo) ASC Kara
So. Coulibaly 45'; Diarrassouba 48'	Report

Felix Houphouet Boigny Stadium, Abidjan
Referee: Abdulrazg Ahmed (Libya)

ASEC Mimosas won 3–2 on aggregate.

14 September 2024
16:00 UTC+0

Paynesville (Liberia)	1–0	(Mali) Stade Malien
Yangbe 73'	Report

SKD Stadium, Monrovia
20 September 2024
16:30 UTC+0

Stade Malien (Mali)	3–1	(Liberia) Paynesville
Cissé 10'; Magassouba 18'; Deanneh 24' (o.g.)	Report	Paye 59'

Stade du 26 Mars, Bamako
Referee: Rulisa Patience Fidele (Rwanda)

Stade Malien won 3–2 on aggregate.

13 September 2024
16:00 UTC+0

Étoile Filante (Burkina Faso)	0–0	(Nigeria) Enyimba
	Report

Stade Mamadou Konaté, Bamako (Mali)
Referee: Tuoniféré Soro (Ivory Coast)
22 September 2024
16:00 UTC+1

Enyimba (Nigeria)	0–0	(Burkina Faso) Étoile Filante
	Report
Penalties
	3–2

Godswill Akpabio International Stadium, Uyo
Referee: Rodrigue Bigirimana (Burundi)

0–0 on aggregate. Enyimba won 3–2 on penalties.

13 September 2024
16:00 UTC+0

RC Abidjan (Ivory Coast)	0–0	(Senegal) ASC Jaraaf
	Report

Felix Houphouet Boigny Stadium, Abidjan
Referee: Belay Tadesse Asserese (Ethiopia)
22 September 2024
17:00 UTC+0

ASC Jaraaf (Senegal)	3–0	(Ivory Coast) RC Abidjan
Fall 7'; Dione 42' (pen.); Bocandé 87' (pen.)	Report

Stade Lat-Dior, Thiès
Referee: Mahmoud El Banna (Egypt)

ASC Jaraaf won 3–0 on aggregate.

14 September 2024
15:00 UTC+3

Administration Police (Kenya)	0–1	(Egypt) Zamalek
	Report	El Said 45'

Nyayo National Stadium, Nairobi
Referee: Hillary Hambaba (Zambia)
20 September 2024
20:00 UTC+3

Zamalek (Egypt)	2–1	(Kenya) Administration Police
Zizo 55'; Maher 59'	Report	Were 65'

Cairo International Stadium, Cairo
Referee: Mweshitsama Negongo Naftal (Namibia)

Zamalek won 3–1 on aggregate.

14 September 2024
19:00 UTC+1

Stade Tunisien (Tunisia)	1–0	(Algeria) USM Alger
Smaali 86'	Report

Hammadi Agrebi Stadium, Tunis
Referee: Jean Pierre Nguiene Bissila (Congo)
22 September 2024
18:00 UTC+1

USM Alger (Algeria)	2–0	(Tunisia) Stade Tunisien
Mondeko 75'; Gassama 90'	Report

Miloud Hadefi Stadium, Oran
Referee: Sabri Mohamed Fadul (Sudan)

USM Alger won 2–1 on aggregate.

15 September 2024
19:00 UTC+2

Al Ahli Tripoli (Libya)	0–0	(Tanzania) Simba
	Report

Tripoli Stadium, Tripoli
22 September 2024
16:00 UTC+3

Simba (Tanzania)	3–1	(Libya) Al Ahli Tripoli
Denis 30'; Ateba 45'; Balua 90'	Report	Mabululu 17'

Benjamin Mkapa Stadium, Dar es Salaam
Referee: Abdoulaye Manet (Guinea)

Simba won 3–1 on aggregate.

15 September 2024
19:00 UTC+2

Al Hilal Benghazi (Libya)	3–2	(Egypt) Al Masry
Eshtawi 64'; Al Badri 72'; Ben Salem 85'	Report	Mohsen 45+4', 69'

Benina Martyrs Stadium, Benghazi
Referee: Tanguy Patrice Mebiame (Gabon)
22 September 2024
19:00 UTC+3

Al Masry (Egypt)	3–2	(Libya) Al Hilal Benghazi
Mohsen 18', 39'; Ben Youssef 83'	Report	El Mohamady 14' (o.g.); Onana 90'
Penalties
	5–3

Borg El Arab Stadium, Alexandria
Referee: Samir Guezzaz (Morocco)

5–5 on aggregate. Al Masry won 5–3 on penalties.

15 September 2024
16:00 UTC+1

Rukinzo (Burundi)	0–1	(Tunisia) CS Sfaxien
	Report	Dhaoui 15'

Taieb Mhiri Stadium, Sfax (Tunisia)
Referee: Julian Nii Akwa Nunoo (Ghana)
21 September 2024
18:30 UTC+1

CS Sfaxien (Tunisia)	1–0	(Burundi) Rukinzo
Sekkouhi 73'	Report

Taieb Mhiri Stadium, Sfax
Referee: Yannick Malala Kabanga (DR Congo)

CS Sfaxien won 2–0 on aggregate.

13 September 2024
19:00 UTC+2

Stellenbosch (South Africa)	2–0	(Democratic Republic of the Congo) AS Vita Club
Moloisane 7'; Mojela 12'	Report

Cape Town Stadium, Cape Town
Referee: Celso Alvação (Mozambique)
22 September 2024
15:00 UTC+1

AS Vita Club (Democratic Republic of the Congo)	1–1	(South Africa) Stellenbosch
Djambae 90' (pen.)	Report	Mojela 76'

Stade des Martyrs, Kinshasa
Referee: Rashid Mohamed Conteh (Sierra Leone)

Stellenbosch won 3–1 on aggregate.

14 September 2024
15:00 UTC+1

Desportivo da LS (Angola)	1–0	(South Africa) Sekhukhune United
Joca 90'	Report

Estádio 11 de Novembro, Luanda
Referee: Emmanuel Mensah (Liberia)
21 September 2024
18:00 UTC+2

Sekhukhune United (South Africa)	2–1	(Angola) Desportivo LS
Makgalwa 24', 69'	Report	Neto 35'

Peter Mokaba Stadium, Polokwane
Referee: Salisu Basheer (Nigeria)

2–2 on aggregate. Desportivo LS won on away goals.

15 September 2024
16:00 UTC+1

Bravos do Maquis (Angola)	1–0	(Democratic Republic of the Congo) Saint-Éloi Lupopo
Matoco 90+6'	Report

Estádio Nacional da Tundavala, Lubango
Referee: Jean Ouattara (Burkina Faso)
22 September 2024
16:30 UTC+2

Saint-Éloi Lupopo (Democratic Republic of the Congo)	1–2	(Angola) Bravos do Maquis
Obassi 20' (pen.)	Report	Katumbwe 66' (o.g.); Fota 88'

Stade Frederic Kibassa Maliba, Lubumbashi
Referee: Adalbert Diouf (Senegal)

Bravos do Maquis won 3–1 on aggregate.

14 September 2024
15:00 UTC+2

Black Bulls (Mozambique)	1–0	(Republic of the Congo) AS Otohô
Guèye 55'	Report

Campo da ABB, Maputo
Referee: Mohamed Ali Moussa (Niger)
22 September 2024
15:30 UTC+1

AS Otohô (Republic of the Congo)	2–1	(Mozambique) Black Bulls
Bitheghe 89' (pen.); Mouandza 90+3'	Report	Ifoni 78'

Stade Alphonse Massemba-Débat, Brazzaville
Referee: Naim Hosni (Tunisia)

2–2 on aggregate. Black Bulls won on away goals.

15 September 2024
16:00 UTC+2

Orapa United (Botswana)	0–1	(Zimbabwe) Dynamos
	Report	Kadonzvo 87'

Obed Itani Chilume Stadium, Francistown
Referee: Ailton Carmelino (Angola)
22 September 2024
15:00 UTC+2

Dynamos (Zimbabwe)	0–1	(Botswana) Orapa United
	Report	Makarati 71' (o.g.)
Penalties
	1–3

Obed Itani Chilume Stadium, Francistown (Botswana)
Referee: Anthony Kiri Emmanuel Daudfourth (South Sudan)

1–1 on aggregate. Orapa United won 3–1 on penalties.

13 September 2024
15:00 UTC+0

Nsoatreman (Ghana)	0–2	(Algeria) CS Constantine
	Report	Benchaâ 11', 27'

Accra Sports Stadium, Accra
Referee: Masangune Louis Mwamba (DR Congo)
21 September 2024
18:00 UTC+1

CS Constantine (Algeria)	1–0	(Ghana) Nsoatreman
Benchaâ 20'	Report

Chahid Hamlaoui Stadium, Constantine
Referee: Thabani Ruzario (Zimbabwe)

CS Constantine won 3–0 on aggregate.

== See also ==
- 2024–25 CAF Champions League qualifying rounds
