= 2024–25 Orlando Pirates F.C. season =

Football club season

Orlando Pirates
2024-25 season
- Chairman: Irvin Khoza
- Manager: José Riveiro
- Stadium: Orlando Stadium
- South African Premiership: 2nd (CAF Champions League)
- MTN 8: Champions
- CAF Champions League: Semi-Final
- Nedbank Cup: Runners-up
- Carling Knockout: Group Stage
- Top goalscorer: League: Tshegofatso Mabasa (5); All: Tshegofatso Mabasa (13)
| Home colours | Away colours |

The 2024–25 season of the league was Orlando Pirate's 29th consecutive season in the Premiership.

The team won the MTN 8 and from the year 2024/25. The team finished 2nd in the Premiership and qualified for the 2025–26 CAF Champions League.

== Season summary ==
The team had a pre-season camp in Spain whereby the played a couple of friendly matches including a game against Bolton wanderers.

They will play the first round of the champions league Champions League.

== Squad ==
| Squad no. | Player | Nationality | Position(s) | Date of birth (age) |
Goalkeepers
| 24 | Sipho Chaine | RSA | GK | 14 December 1996 (age 29) |
| 35 | Melusi Buthelezi | RSA | GK | 7 March 1998 (age 28) |
| 40 | Siyabonga Dladla | RSA | GK | — |
Defenders
| 2 | Tshepo mashiloane | RSA | RB | 30 April 2002 (age 24) |
| 3 | Nkosikhona ndaba | RSA | LB | 12 August 2002 (age 24) |
| 5 | Nkosinathi Sibisi (c) | RSA | CB | 22 September 1995 (age 31) |
| 6 | Olisa Ndah | Nigeria | CB | 21 January 1998 (age 28) |
| 21 | Deano Van Rooyen | RSA | LB | 24 November 1996 (age 29) |
| 34 | Siyabonga ndlozi | RSA | RB | 10 December 2002 (age 22) |
| 26 | Bandile Shandu | RSA | LB | 19 January 1995 (age 31) |
| 27 | Tapelo Xoki (vc) | RSA | CB | 10 April 1995 (age 31) |
| 33 | Lebone seema | RSA | CB | 5 April 2003 (age 23) |
| 4 | Thabiso Sesane | RSA | CB | 30 May 2000 ( age 24) |
| 39 | Mbekezeli Mbokazi Vice-captain (association football) | RSA | CB | 19 September 2005 (age 21) |
Midfielders
| 7 | Deon Hotto | Namibia | CM/LB/LW | 29 October 1990 (age 35) |
| 8 | Makhehlene Makhaula | RSA | DM | 17 November 1989 (age 36) |
| 16 | Thalente Mbatha | RSA | DM | 6 March 2000 (age 26) |
| 18 | Kabelo Dlamini | RSA | AM/WF | 16 May 1996 (age 30) |
| 20 | Goodman Mosele ★ | RSA | CM | 18 November 1999 (age 26) |
| 25 | Karim Kimvuidi | COD | AM | 13 March 2002 (age 24)☆ |
| 28 | Patrick Maswanganyi | RSA | AM | 4 April 1998 (age 28) |
| 30 | Sihle Nduli | RSA | CM | 10 October 1995 (age 30) |
| 31 | Selaelo Rasebotja | RSA | CM | 26 April 2001 (age 25) |
| 32 | Thuso Moleleki | RSA | CM | 16 March 2000 (age 24)☆ |
| 37 | Thabiso Lebitso | RSA | CM/CB | 4 March 1992 (age 34) |
Forwards
| 11 | Gilberto | Angola | WF | 10 March 2001 (age 25)☆ |
| 14 | Monnapule Saleng | RSA | WF | 13 March 1999 (age 27)☆ |
| 17 | Evidence Makgopa | RSA | CF | 5 June 2000 (age 26) |
| 19 | Tshegofatso Mabasa | RSA | CF | 1 October 1996 (age 30) |
| 38 | Relebohile Mofokeng | RSA | WF/CM/AM | 23 October 2004 (age 21) |
| 42 | Boitumelo Radiopane | RSA | CF | 11 October 2002 (age 23) |

| ★ | Loan Out |

== Competitions ==
=== Overall Record ===
| Competition | First match | Last match | Starting round | Final position | Record | | | | | | | |
| Competition | First match | Last match | Starting round | Final position | Pld | W | D | L | GF | GA | GD | Win % |
|---|---|---|---|---|---|---|---|---|---|---|---|---|
| Betway Premiership | 18 September 2024 | 28 May 2025 | Matchday 1 | 2nd | 28 | 19 | 4 | 5 | 43 | 20 | +23 | 67.86 |
| Nedbank Cup | 26 January 2025 | 10 May 2025 | Round of 32 | Runners-up | 5 | 3 | 1 | 1 | 10 | 6 | +4 | 60.00 |
| Carling Knockout Cup | 19 October 2024 | 19 October 2024 | Round of 16 | Round of 16 | 1 | 0 | 0 | 1 | 2 | 3 | −1 | 0.00 |
| MTN 8 | 3 August 2024 | 5 October 2024 | Quarter Finals | Winners | 4 | 3 | 1 | 0 | 9 | 3 | +6 | 75.00 |
| Champions League | 18 August 2024 | 25 April 2025 | Preliminary Round 1 | Semi-finals | 14 | 8 | 5 | 1 | 20 | 7 | +13 | 57.14 |
| Total | | | | | 52 | 33 | 11 | 8 | 84 | 39 | +45 | 63.46 |

Last updated: 25 April 2025
Source: Competitions

=== Friendlies ===
| 12 July 2024 | Plymouth Argyle | 2–2 | Orlando Pirates | Marbella |
| 18:00 | Issaka 41'; Wright 63' | | Makgopa 40'; Ndah 43' | Stadium: Banús Football Center |

| 15 July 2024 | Sevilla | 0–2 | Orlando Pirates | Seville |
| 20:00 | | | Timm 22'; Dlamini 82' | Stadium: Rámon Cisneros Palacios |

| 17 July 2024 | Orlando Pirates | 1–1 | Granada | Marbella |
| 18:00 | Gilberto 20' | | Weissman 22' | Stadium: Banús Football Center |

| 19 July 2024 | Al Sadd | 3–2 | Orlando Pirates | Marbella |
| 17:30 | Ali 3' Sesane 40'(O.G.) Plata 54' | | Mabasa 9' , 10' | Stadium: Banús Football Center |

=== Betway Premiership ===
==== League Position ====
| Pos | Team | Pld | W | D | L | GF | GA | GD | Pts | Qualification or relegation |
|---|---|---|---|---|---|---|---|---|---|---|
| 1 | Mamelodi Sundowns (C) | 28 | 24 | 1 | 3 | 65 | 13 | +52 | 73 | Qualification for 2025–26 CAF Champions League |
| 2 | Orlando Pirates | 28 | 19 | 4 | 5 | 43 | 20 | +23 | 61 | Qualification for 2025–26 CAF Champions League |
| 3 | Stellenbosch | 28 | 13 | 9 | 6 | 34 | 21 | +13 | 48 | Qualification for 2025–26 CAF Confederation Cup |
| 4 | Sekhukhune United | 28 | 13 | 7 | 8 | 39 | 31 | +8 | 46 | |
| 5 | TS Galaxy | 28 | 8 | 11 | 9 | 30 | 30 | 0 | 35 | |

Source: Premier Soccer League
(C) Champions

==== Results Summary ====
| Overall | | | | | | | | Home | | | | | | Away | | | | | |
| Pld | W | D | L | GF | GA | GD | Pts | W | D | L | GF | GA | GD | W | D | L | GF | GA | GD |
|---|---|---|---|---|---|---|---|---|---|---|---|---|---|---|---|---|---|---|---|
| 19 | 14 | 1 | 4 | 31 | 14 | +17 | 43 | 9 | 0 | 1 | 23 | 6 | +17 | 5 | 1 | 3 | 8 | 8 | 0 |

==== Results by Round ====
| matchday | 1 | 2 | 3 | 4 | 5 | 6 | 7 | 8 | 9 | 10 | 11 |
|---|---|---|---|---|---|---|---|---|---|---|---|
| ground | H | H | A | H | A | H | A | H | H | A | H |
| Results | W | W | W | | | | | | | | |
| Position | 2 | 3 | 2 | | | | | | | | |
| Points | 3 | 6 | 9 | | | | | | | | |

Source: psl
A = Away; H = Home; W = Win; D = Draw; L = Loss

==== Matches ====
| 18 September 2024 Matchday 1 | Orlando Pirates | 2–1 | Chippa United | Johannesburg |
| 19:30 SAST | T.Mabasa 45+5' (pen.); M.Saleng 90+1' | Report | A.Jali 22' | Stadium: Orlando Stadium |

| 24 September 2024 Matchday 2 | Orlando Pirates | 3–0 | Polokwane City | Johannesburg |
| 15:00 SAST | M.Saleng 55'; Makgopa 85', 90+1' | Report | | Stadium: Orlando Stadium |

| 29 September 2024 Matchday 3 | Richards Bay | 0–1 | Orlando Pirates | Umlazi |
| 15:00 SAST | | Report | K.Dlamini 82' | Stadium: King Zwelithini Stadium |

| 22 October 2024 Matchday 11 | Orlando Pirates | 2–0 | SuperSport United | Johannesburg |
| 19:30 SAST | Makgopa 2'; Hotto 90+2' | Report | | Stadium: Orlando Stadium |

| 25 October 2024 Matchday 4 | Orlando Pirates | 2–1 | AmaZulu | Johannesburg |
| 19:30 SAST | Nkota 31', 37' | Report | Ekstein 90+3' | Stadium: Orlando Stadium |

| 29 October 2024 Matchday 5 | TS Galaxy | 0–2 | Orlando Pirates | Mbombela |
| 19:30 SAST | | Report | Mbatha 16'; Mofokeng 72' | Stadium: Mbombela Stadium |

| 5 November 2024 Matchday 17 | Orlando Pirates | 1–0 | Richards Bay | Johannesburg |
| | Makgopa 26' | | | Stadium: Orlando Stadium |

| 1 December 2024 Matchday 6 | Orlando Pirates | 0–1 | Stellenbosch | Johannesburg |
| 15:30 SAST | | Report | Titus 33' | Stadium: Orlando Pirates |

| 24 December 2025 Matchday 20 | Orlando Pirates | 8–1 | Marumo Gallants | Johannesburg |
| | Nthatheni 39'(O.G.); Mabasa 47' , 53' , 64'; Van Rooyen 59'; Mbatha 70' , 82'; Radiopane 90' (pen.) | | Mhango 23' | Stadium: Orlando Stadium |

| 29 December 2024 Matchday 10 | Magesi | 0–1 | Orlando Pirates | Johannesburg |
| 15:30 SAST | | Report | Mofokeng 45' | Stadium: Orlando Stadium |

| 8 January 2025 Matchday 12 | Cape Town City | 1–0 | Orlando Pirates | Cape Town |
| | Darwin González 74' | | | Stadium: Cape Town Stadium |

| 1 February 2025 Matchday 15 | Orlando Pirates | 1–0 | Kaizer Chiefs | Johannesburg |
| 13:00 CEST | Maswanganyi 90+6' (pen.) | | | Stadium: FNB Stadium |

| 5 February 2025 Matchday 16 | Sekhukhune United | 1–2 | Orlando Pirates | Polokwane |
| | Mntambo 77' | | Hotto 5'; Makhaula 47' | Stadium: Peter Mokaba Stadium |

| 8 February 2025 Matchday 13 | Mamelodi Sundowns | 4–1 | Orlando Pirates | Pretoria |
| | Kekana 13'; Ribeiro 27' , 59'; Mokoena 78' | Report | Hotto 57' | Stadium: Loftus Versfeld |

| 22 February 2025 Matchday 19 | Orlando Pirates | 2–1 | Cape Town City | Johannesburg |
| 15:30 SAST | Mabasa 67'; Mosele 87' | Report | Domingo 21' | Stadium: Orlando Stadium; Referee: Luxolo Badi |

| 1 March 2025 Matchday 8 | Marumo Gallants | 2–0 | Orlando Pirates | Bloemfontein |
| 17:45 SAST | Mhango 15'; Mbatha 74' (O.G.) | Report | | Stadium: Free State Stadium; Referee: Tom Abongile |

| 5 March 2025 Matchday 21 | Chippa United | 0–1 | Orlando Pirates | Gqeberha |
| 19:30 SAST | | Report | Sibisi 45+3' | Stadium: Nelson Mandela Bay Stadium; Referee: Gasa Sikhumbuzo |

=== MTN 8 ===
| 3 August 2024 Quarter Finals | Orlando Pirates | 3–1 (a.e.t.) | SuperSport United | Johannesburg |
| 18:00 SAST | Ndah 44'; Saleng 92'; Makgopa 107' | Report | Pule 49' | Stadium: Orlando Stadium |

| 28 August 2024 Semi-Finals 1st Leg | Cape Town City | 1–1 (1–1 agg.) | Orlando Pirates | Cape Town |
| 18:00 SAST | Rhodes 61' | Report | Mofokeng 15' | Stadium: Cape Town Stadium |

| 28 August 2024 Semi-Finals 1st Leg | Orlando Pirates | 2–0 (3–1 agg.) | Cape Town City | Johannesburg |
| 15:00 SAST | Mabasa 25'; Hotto 43' | Report | | Stadium: Orlando Stadium |

| 5 October 2024 Final | Orlando Pirates | 3–1 | Stellenbosch | Durban |
| 18:00 SAST | Saleng 43'; Mabasa 90+1'; Mofokeng 90+6' | Report | Mojela 12' | Stadium: Moses Mabhida Stadium; Man of the Match: T.Sesane |

=== Carling Knockout ===
| 19 October 2024 Round of 16 | Orlando Pirates | 2–3 | Magesi | Soweto |
| 15:00 SAST | Dlamini 86'; Makgopa 89' | Report | Abrahams 33'; Sasane 39'(O.G.); Chirambadare 45+4' | Stadium: Orlando Stadium |

=== Nedbank Cup ===
| 26 January 2025 Round of 32 | Richards Bay | 1–3 | Orlando Pirates | Umlazi |
| 15:00 SAST | Mbuthuma 47' | | Maswanganyi 22' 26'; Mabasa 90+3' | Stadium: King Zwelithini Stadium |

| 15 February 2025 Round of 16 | Orlando Pirates | 3–1 | Baroka | Johannesburg |
| 15:00 SAST | Mabasa 29' , 45+1' , 63' | | Malivha 75' | Stadium: Orlando Stadium |

| 8 March 2025 Quarterfinals | SuperSport United | 2–2 (a.e.t.) (4–5 p) | Orlando Pirates | Polokwane |
| 15:00 SAST | | | | Stadium: Old Peter Mokaba Stadium |

| 13 April 2025 Semi-finals | Orlando Pirates | 1–0 | Marumo Gallants | Soweto |
| 15:00 SAST | Dlamini 22' | | | Stadium: Orlando Stadium |

| 10 May 2025 Finals | Kaizer Chiefs | 2–1 | Orlando Pirates | Durban |
| 15:00 SAST | Sirino 10' (pen.); Maart 80' | | Makgopa 17' | Stadium: Moses Mabhida Stadium |

=== CAF Champions League ===
==== Preliminary Rounds ====
| 18 August 2024 Preliminary Round 1 1st Leg | CNaPS Sport (Madagascar) | 0–0 (0–0 agg.) | (South Africa) Orlando Pirates | Miarinarivo |
| | | Report | | Stadium: National Sports Complex Pitch 1 |

| 23 August 2024 Preliminary Round 1 2nd Leg | Orlando Pirates (South Africa) | 4–0 (4–0 agg.) | (Madagascar) CNaPS Sport | Johannesburg |
| | T.Monyane 9'; R.Mofokeng 25'; P.Maswanganyi 28'; K.Kimvuidi 90' | Report | | Stadium: Orlando Stadium |

| 14 September 2024 Preliminary Round 2 1st Leg | Jwaneng Galaxy (Botswana) | 0–2 (0–2 agg.) | (South Africa) Orlando Pirates | Gaborone |
| | | Report | T.Mabasa 45+3'; Hotto 77' | Stadium: Botswana National Stadium |

| 21 September 2024 Preliminary Round 2 2nd Leg | Orlando Pirates (South Africa) | 1–0 (3–0 agg.) | (Botswana) Jwaneng Galaxy | Johannesburg |
| 16:00 SAST | M.Saleng 90+2' | Report | | Stadium: Orlando Stadium |

==== Group Stage ====
The group stage draw was held on 7 October 2024.

| Pos | Team | Pld | W | D | L | GF | GA | GD | Pts | Qualification | OPFC | AHL | CRB | SAB |
|---|---|---|---|---|---|---|---|---|---|---|---|---|---|---|
| 1 | (South Africa) Orlando Pirates | 6 | 4 | 2 | 0 | 10 | 4 | +6 | 14 | Advance to knockout stage | — | 0–0 | 2–1 | 3–0 |
| 2 | (Egypt) Al Ahly | 6 | 3 | 1 | 2 | 14 | 7 | +7 | 10 | Advance to knockout stage | 1–2 | — | 6–1 | 4–2 |
| 3 | (Algeria) CR Belouizdad | 6 | 3 | 0 | 3 | 11 | 10 | +1 | 9 | | 1–2 | 1–0 | — | 6–0 |
| 4 | (Ivory Coast) Stade d'Abidjan | 6 | 0 | 1 | 5 | 4 | 18 | −14 | 1 | | 1–1 | 1–3 | 0–1 | — |

Source: CAF
Rules for classification: Group stage tiebreakers

| 26 November 2024 Matchday 1 | CR Belouizdad (Algeria) | 1–2 | (South Africa) Orlando Pirates | Algiers |
| 19:00 | Mayo 66' | | Nkota 5' 27' | Stadium: August 20 1955 Stadium |

| 7 December 2024 Matchday 2 | Orlando Pirates (South Africa) | 0–0 | (Egypt) Al Ahly SC | Johannesburg |
| | | | | Stadium: Orlando Stadium |

| 14 December 2024 Matchday 3 | Stade d'Abidjan (Ivory Coast) | 1–1 | (South Africa) Orlando Pirates | Abidjan |
| | Meite 53' | | Makgopa 45+3' | Stadium: Stade Robert Champroux |

| 4 January 2025 Matchday 4 | Orlando Pirates (South Africa) | 3–0 | (Ivory Coast) Stade d'Abidjan | Johannesburg |
| | Mofokeng 22'; Maswanganyi 50'; Hotto 85' | | | Stadium: Orlando Stadium |

| 12 January 2025 Matchday 5 | Orlando Pirates (South Africa) | 2–1 | (Algeria) CR Belouizdad | Johannesburg |
| | Mofokeng 20'; Mbatha 61' | | Benguit 90+2' | Stadium: Orlando Stadium |

| 18 January 2025 Matchday 6 | Al Ahly SC (Egypt) | 1–2 | (South Africa) Orlando Pirates | Cairo |
| | El Shahat 69' | | Mofokeng 53'; Mabasa 83' | Stadium: Cairo International Stadium |

==== Knockout Stage ====
===== Quarter-finals =====
| 1 April 2025 1st leg | MC Alger (Algeria) | 0–1 | (South Africa) Orlando Pirates | Algiers |
| 18:00 UTC+01:00 | | Report | Nkota 65' | Stadium: Stade du 5 Juillet; Attendance: 60,000; Referee: Mahmood Ismail (Sudan) |

| 8 April 2025 2nd leg | Orlando Pirates (South Africa) | 0–0 (1–0 agg.) | (Algeria) MC Alger | Johannesburg |
| 18:00 UTC+2 | | Report | | Stadium: Orlando Stadium; Attendance: 35,000; Referee: Ibrahim Kalilou Traoré (Ivory Coast) |

===== Semi-finals =====
| 19 April 2025 First leg | Orlando Pirates (South Africa) | 0–0 | (Egypt) Pyramids | Johannesburg |
| 18:00 UTC+2 | | Report | | Stadium: Orlando Stadium; Referee: Pacifique Ndabihawenimana (Burundi) |

| 25 April 2025 Second leg | Pyramids (Egypt) | 3–2 (3–2 agg.) | (South Africa) Orlando Pirates | Cairo |
| 21:00 UTC+3 | Mayele 45+1', 84'; Sobhi 57' | Report | Mofokeng 41'; Nkota 52' | Stadium: 30 June Stadium; Referee: Tanguy Mebiame (Gabon) |

== Statistics ==
=== Goal Scorers ===
| Rank | Name | Competition | | | | | Total |
| Rank | Name | Betway Premiership | MTN 8 | CAF Champions League | Carling Knockout | Nedbank Cup | Total |
|---|---|---|---|---|---|---|---|
| 1 | Tshegofatso Mabasa | 5 | 2 | 2 | 0 | 4 | 13 |
| 2 | Relebohile Mofokeng | 2 | 2 | 4 | 0 | 0 | 8 |
| 3 | Evidence Makgopa | 4 | 1 | 1 | 1 | 0 | 7 |
| 4 | Deon Hotto | 3 | 1 | 2 | 0 | 0 | 6 |
| 5 | Monnapule Saleng | 2 | 2 | 1 | 0 | 0 | 5 |

=== Assists ===
| Rank | Name | Competition | | | | | Total |
| Rank | Name | Betway Premiership | MTN 8 | CAF Champions League | Carling Knockout | Nedbank Cup | Total |
|---|---|---|---|---|---|---|---|
| 1 | Relebohile Mofokeng | 1 | 2 | 0 | 0 | 0 | 3 |
| 2 | Deon Hotto | 1 | 0 | 0 | 0 | 1 | 2 |
| 2 | Kabelo Dlamini | 0 | 1 | 0 | 1 | 0 | 2 |
| 3 | Thabiso Sesane | 0 | 1 | 0 | 0 | 0 | 1 |
| 3 | Monnapule Saleng | 0 | 1 | 0 | 0 | 0 | 1 |
| 3 | Tshegofatso Mabasa | 0 | 1 | 0 | 0 | 0 | 1 |
