= 2026 FIFA World Cup Group A =

FIFA World Cup group

Group A of the 2026 FIFA World Cup took place from June 11 to 24, 2026. The group consisted of national football teams representing Mexico (co-host), South Africa, South Korea, and the Czech Republic. This also marked the return of the Czech Republic and South Africa to the World Cup, respectively, since 2006 and 2010.

The top two teams, Mexico and South Africa, secured their place in the round of 32. Mexico won the group, winning three consecutive games, while South Africa won one game and drew the other, having lost their opening match to Mexico. South Korea finished third, having won one game, while the Czech Republic finished fourth with a single point.

== Teams ==
Draw position	Team	Pot	Confederation	Method of qualification	Date of qualification	Finals appearance	Last appearance	Previous best performance	FIFA Rankings	
Draw position	Team	Pot	Confederation	Method of qualification	Date of qualification	Finals appearance	Last appearance	Previous best performance	November 2025 (Note: The rankings of November 2025 were used for seeding for the final draw.)	June 2026
A1	Mexico	1	CONCACAF	Co-host	February 14, 2023 (Note: Although the United bid was selected on June 13, 2018, the automatic berths allocated to the hosts were not confirmed until a decision by the FIFA Council on February 14, 2023.)	18th	2022	Quarter-finals (1970, 1986)	15	14
A2	South Africa	3	CAF	CAF Group C winner	October 14, 2025	4th	2010	Group stage (1998, 2002, 2010)	61	60
A3	South Korea	2	AFC	AFC third round Group B winner	June 5, 2025	12th	2022	Fourth place (2002)	22	25
A4	Czech Republic (Note: The Czech Republic competed between 1919 and 1992 as Czechoslovakia. Statistically, FIFA considers the Czech Republic to be the sole successor to the record of Czechoslovakia.)	4 (Note: As the identity of the UEFA second round Path D winner was not known at the time of the final draw, positions in the FIFA Rankings were not taken into account, and the placeholder in the draw was automatically seeded into pot 4.)	UEFA	UEFA second round Path D winner	March 31, 2026	10th	2006	Runner-up (1934, 1962)	44	40

== Standings ==
Pos	Team	Pld	W	D	L	GF	GA	GD	Pts	Qualification
1	Mexico (H)	3	3	0	0	6	0	+6	9	Advance to knockout stage
2	South Africa	3	1	1	1	2	3	−1	4	Advance to knockout stage
3	South Korea	3	1	0	2	2	3	−1	3	
4	Czech Republic	3	0	1	2	2	6	−4	1	

Source: FIFA
Rules for classification: Group stage tiebreakers
(H) Hosts

In the round of 32:

- The winner of Group A, Mexico, advanced to play the third-place team of Group E, Ecuador.
- The runner-up of Group A, South Africa, advanced to play the runner-up of Group B, Canada.

== Matches ==
All times listed are local.

=== Mexico vs South Africa ===
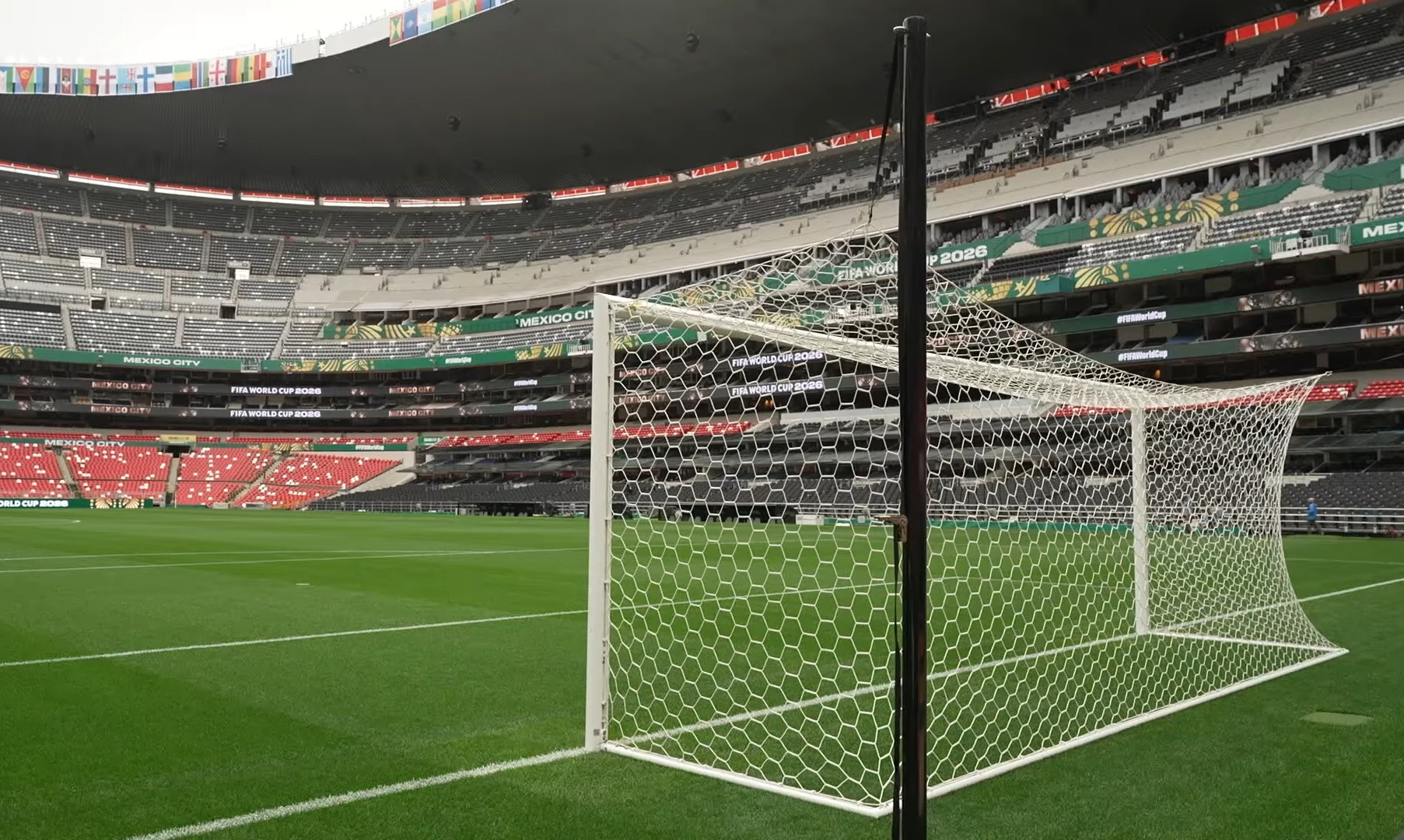
Inside Estadio Azteca prior to the opening match

The two teams had faced each other four times, most recently in a 1–1 draw in the 2010 FIFA World Cup opening match, with South Africa as the host nation. This match coincidentally took place exactly 16 years after. Additionally, South Africa manager Hugo Broos and Mexico’s Javier Aguirre encountered each other on the same pitch during the 1986 World Cup as players for Belgium and Mexico, respectively.

Mexico went in front in the 9th minute when Julián Quiñones scored with a low right footed finish through the legs of South African goalkeeper Ronwen Williams from just inside the penalty area after Sphephelo Sithole was caught in possession on the edge of the penalty area by Erik Lira. Four minutes into the second half, South Africa's Sphephelo Sithole was sent-off after fouling Mexico's Brian Gutiérrez when he was going through on goal. It was 2–0 in the 67th minute when Raúl Jiménez scored his first goal at a World Cup finals, a header at the back post to the left of the net after a cross from the right by Roberto Alvarado.

In the 73rd minute, South African substitute Themba Zwane was sent off for a slap in the face of Mexican forward Roberto Alvarado. In the 92nd minute there was a third red card in the game with Mexican captain César Montes sent off for denying a goalscoring opportunity by fouling Khuliso Mudau with Mexico going on to win the game 2–0.

This marked the first time Mexico won an opening match as they had lost opening matches in 1930, 1950 and 1954, and drawing in the 1970 (as hosts) and 2010 editions. This marked the first opening match with the most red cards in FIFA World Cup history. It also has the most red cards since the Battle of Nuremberg, which was a match between Portugal vs Netherlands in the 2006 FIFA World Cup that had a total of 4 red cards.

June 11, 2026
1:00 p.m. UTC−6

Mexico	2–0	South Africa
Quiñones 9'; Jiménez 67'	(Note: "Mexico vs South Africa | First Stage | FIFA World Cup 2026". FIFA. Retrieved June 11, 2026.; "Match Report – Group A – Mexico v. South Africa". FIFA. June 11, 2026. Retrieved June 11, 2026.; "Post match summary report – Group A – Mexico v. South Africa". FIFA. June 12, 2026. Retrieved June 12, 2026.)

Estadio Azteca, Mexico City
Attendance: 80,824
Referee: Wilton Sampaio (Brazil)

Mexico	South Africa

GK	1	Raúl Rangel
RB	15	Israel Reyes
CB	3	César Montes (c)	(red card) 90+2'
CB	5	Johan Vásquez
LB	23	Jesús Gallardo
DM	6	Érik Lira		(substituted off) 76'
CM	8	Álvaro Fidalgo		(substituted off) 66'
CM	26	Brian Gutiérrez	(yellow card) 23'	(substituted off) 66'
RF	25	Roberto Alvarado
CF	9	Raúl Jiménez		(substituted off) 76'
LF	16	Julián Quiñones		(substituted off) 79'
Substitutions:
MF	19	Gilberto Mora		(substituted on) 66'
MF	24	Luis Chávez		(substituted on) 66'
DF	4	Edson Álvarez		(substituted on) 76'
FW	14	Armando González		(substituted on) 76'
FW	10	Alexis Vega		(substituted on) 79'
Manager:
Javier Aguirre

GK	1	Ronwen Williams (c)
CB	21	Ime Okon
CB	19	Nkosinathi Sibisi	(yellow card) 74'
CB	14	Mbekezeli Mbokazi
RWB	20	Khuliso Mudau
LWB	6	Aubrey Modiba		(substituted off) 76'
CM	23	Jayden Adams		(substituted off) 61'
CM	13	Sphephelo Sithole	(red card) 49'
CM	4	Teboho Mokoena	(yellow card) 17'
CF	9	Lyle Foster		(substituted off) 56'
CF	15	Iqraam Rayners		(substituted off) 76'
Substitutions:
MF	5	Thalente Mbatha		(substituted on) 56'
MF	11	Themba Zwane	(red card) 84'	(substituted on) 61'
FW	7	Oswin Appollis		(substituted on) 76'
FW	17	Evidence Makgopa		(substituted on) 76'
Manager:
(Belgium) Hugo Broos

Man of the Match:
Julián Quiñones (Mexico)

Assistant referees:
Bruno Pires (Brazil)
Bruno Boschilia (Brazil)
Fourth official:
Juan Gabriel Benítez (Paraguay)
Reserve assistant referee:
Eduardo Cardozo (Paraguay)
Video assistant referee:
Nicolás Gallo (Colombia)
Assistant video assistant referee:
Juan Lara (Chile)
Support video assistant referee:
Jérôme Brisard (France)

=== South Korea vs Czech Republic ===
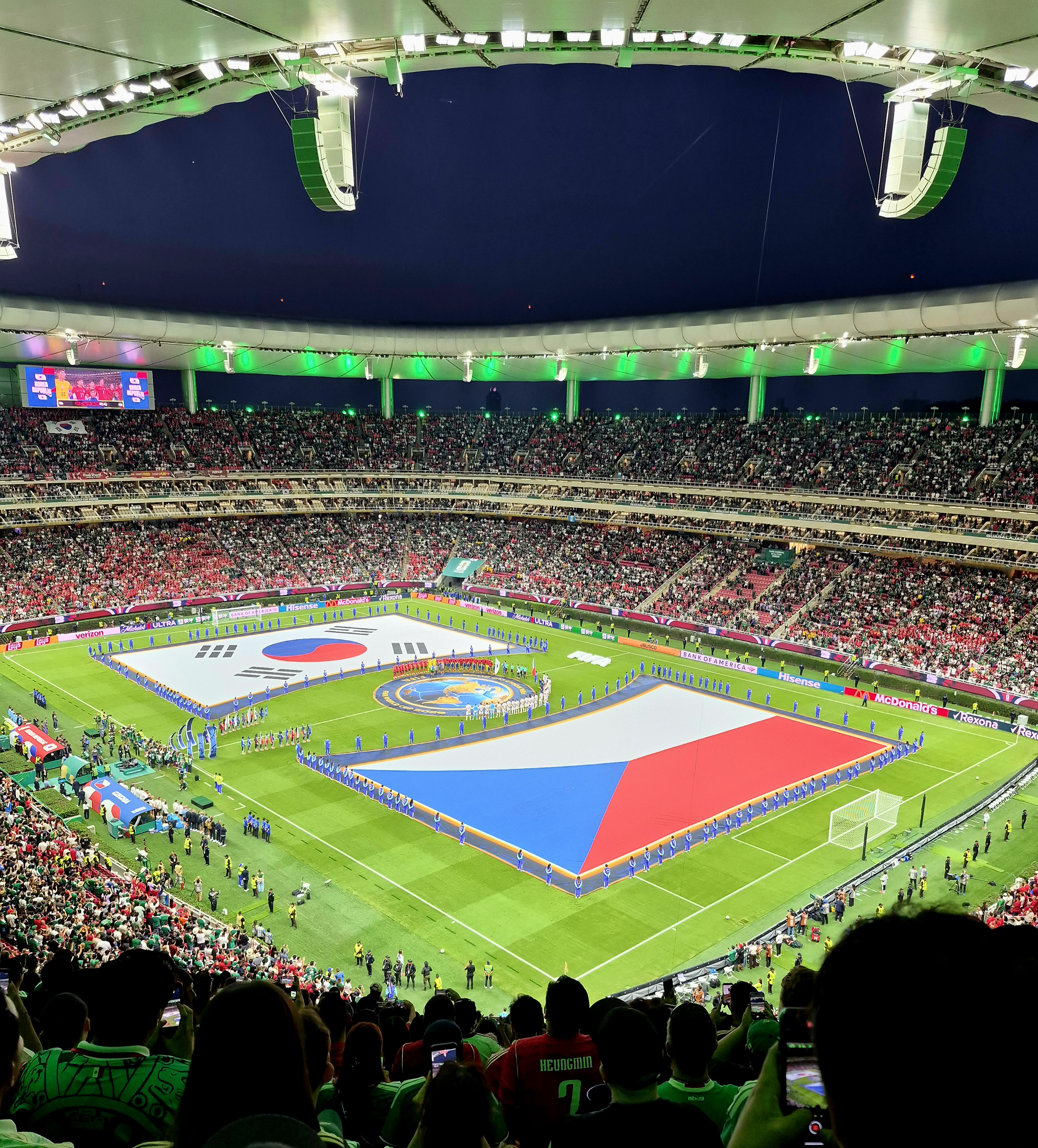
Pre-match ceremony between South Korea and Czech Republic

The teams had played each other three times, most recently in a 2016 friendly, a 2–1 victory for the South Koreans. South Korea and Czechoslovakia, the Czech Republic's predecessor state, met previously three times in the 1980s, with a win for the Koreans and two draws. The fixture marked the Czech Republic's return to the World Cup after a 20-year absence, following a group-stage elimination in 2006 during their debut as an independent nation.

The Czech Republic went in front in the 59th minute with a header from captain Ladislav Krejčí to the right of the net from six yards out after a long throw-in from Vladimir Coufal from the right. It was 1–1 in the 67th minute when Hwang In-beom received the ball from Lee Kang-in before turning back onto his right foot before scooping the ball over the advancing Matěj Kovář and into the right of the net.

In the 78th minute, Tomáš Souček headed in a free kick from the left, but the goal was ruled out for offside. In the 80th minute, Hwang In-beom crossed low from the right and Oh Hyeon-gyu finished from six yards out to the left of the net to put South Korea 2–1 in front. In the 82nd minute, South Korean goalkeeper Kim Seung-gyu saved down low to his right to stop Adam Hložek's close-range effort with South Korea going on to win 2–1.

June 11, 2026
8:00 p.m. UTC−6

South Korea	2–1	Czech Republic
Hwang In-beom 67'; Oh Hyeon-gyu 80'	(Note: "Korea Republic vs Czechia | First Stage | FIFA World Cup 2026". FIFA. Retrieved June 11, 2026.; "Match Report – Group A – Korea Republic v. Czechia". FIFA. June 11, 2026. Retrieved June 11, 2026.; "Post match summary report – Group A – Korea Republic v. Czechia". FIFA. June 12, 2026. Retrieved June 12, 2026.)	Krejčí 59'

Estadio Akron, Zapopan
Attendance: 44,985
Referee: Amin Omar (Egypt)

South Korea	Czech Republic

GK	1	Kim Seung-gyu
CB	2	Lee Han-beom
CB	4	Kim Min-jae
CB	3	Lee Gi-hyuk	(yellow card) 90+6'
RM	22	Seol Young-woo
CM	6	Hwang In-beom		(substituted off) 84'
CM	8	Paik Seung-ho		(substituted off) 84'
LM	13	Lee Tae-seok		(substituted off) 69'
RF	19	Lee Kang-in
CF	7	Son Heung-min (c)		(substituted off) 69'
LF	10	Lee Jae-sung		(substituted off) 62'
Substitutions:
MF	11	Hwang Hee-chan		(substituted on) 62'
MF	25	Eom Ji-sung		(substituted on) 69'
FW	18	Oh Hyeon-gyu		(substituted on) 69'
MF	24	Kim Jin-gyu		(substituted on) 84'
DF	16	Park Jin-seob		(substituted on) 84'
Manager:
Hong Myung-bo

GK	1	Matěj Kovář
CB	6	Štěpán Chaloupek
CB	4	Robin Hranáč
CB	7	Ladislav Krejčí (c)
RWB	5	Vladimír Coufal
LWB	20	Jaroslav Zelený
CM	22	Tomáš Souček
CM	17	Lukáš Provod	(substituted off) 63'
RF	24	Alexandr Sojka	(substituted off) 84'
CF	10	Patrik Schick	(substituted off) 63'
LF	15	Pavel Šulc	(substituted off) 63'
Substitutions:
FW	9	Adam Hložek	(substituted on) 63'
MF	18	Michal Sadílek	(substituted on) 63'
FW	19	Tomáš Chorý	(substituted on) 63'
FW	13	Mojmír Chytil	(substituted on) 84'
Manager:
Miroslav Koubek

Man of the Match:
Hwang In-beom (South Korea)

Assistant referees:
Mahmoud Abouregal (Egypt)
Ahmed Hossam Taha (Egypt)
Fourth official:
Juan Gabriel Calderón (Costa Rica)
Reserve assistant referee:
Juan Carlos Mora (Costa Rica)
Video assistant referee:
Mahmoud Ashour (Egypt)
Assistant video assistant referee:
Joe Dickerson (United States)
Support video assistant referee:
Marco Di Bello (Italy)

=== Czech Republic vs South Africa ===
The teams had only played each other in the 1997 FIFA Confederations Cup, where the teams drew 2–2. This was the only match in Group A held outside of Mexico.

By officiating this match, referees Tori Penso, Brooke Mayo, and Kathryn Nesbitt became the second all-female on-field refereeing trio, and the first from the United States, to take charge of a match at a men's FIFA World Cup.

In the 6th minute, Michal Sadílek scored with a finish from the left of the penalty area into the right of the net. In the 83rd minute, South Africa were awarded a penalty when a shot from Thapelo Maseko hit the arm of Pavel Šulc inside the penalty area. Teboho Mokoena scored the penalty, sending the goalkeeper the wrong way with a shot to the left to make it 1–1.

June 18, 2026
12:00 p.m. UTC−4

Czech Republic	1–1	South Africa
Sadílek 6'	(Note: "Czech Republic vs South Africa | First Stage | FIFA World Cup 2026". FIFA. Retrieved June 18, 2026.; "Match Report – Group A – Czechia v. South Africa". FIFA. June 18, 2026. Retrieved June 18, 2026.; "Post match summary report – Group A – Czechia v. South Africa". FIFA. June 18, 2026. Retrieved June 19, 2026.)	Mokoena 83' (pen.)

Mercedes-Benz Stadium, Atlanta
Attendance: 67,442
Referee: Tori Penso (United States)

Czech Republic	South Africa

GK	1	Matěj Kovář
CB	3	Tomáš Holeš
CB	4	Robin Hranáč
CB	7	Ladislav Krejčí (c)	(yellow card) 75'
RM	5	Vladimír Coufal
CM	18	Michal Sadílek		(substituted off) 67'
CM	12	Lukáš Červ		(substituted off) 78'
CM	8	Vladimír Darida		(substituted off) 55'
LM	24	Alexandr Sojka		(substituted off) 55'
CF	10	Patrik Schick
CF	9	Adam Hložek		(substituted off) 67'
Substitutions:
DF	20	Jaroslav Zelený		(substituted on) 55'
MF	15	Pavel Šulc		(substituted on) 55'
MF	22	Tomáš Souček		(substituted on) 67'
MF	17	Lukáš Provod		(substituted on) 67'
DF	2	David Zima		(substituted on) 78'
Manager:
Miroslav Koubek

GK	1	Ronwen Williams (c)
RB	20	Khuliso Mudau
CB	21	Ime Okon
CB	14	Mbekezeli Mbokazi
LB	6	Aubrey Modiba
CM	23	Jayden Adams		(substituted off) 46'
CM	4	Teboho Mokoena	(yellow card) 33'
CM	5	Thalente Mbatha	(yellow card) 40'
RF	12	Thapelo Maseko		(substituted off) 84'
CF	15	Iqraam Rayners		(substituted off) 66'
LF	7	Oswin Appollis
Substitutions:
FW	10	Relebohile Mofokeng		(substituted on) 46'
FW	17	Evidence Makgopa		(substituted on) 66'
DF	25	Kamogelo Sebelebele		(substituted on) 84'
Manager:
(Belgium) Hugo Broos

Man of the Match:
Ladislav Krejčí (Czech Republic)

Assistant referees:
Kathryn Nesbitt (United States)
Brooke Mayo (United States)
Fourth official:
Campbell-Kirk Kawana-Waugh (New Zealand)
Reserve assistant referee:
Isaac Trevis (New Zealand)
Video assistant referee:
Tatiana Guzmán (Nicaragua)
Assistant video assistant referee:
Joe Dickerson (United States)
Support video assistant referee:
Mohammed Obaid Khadim (United Arab Emirates)

=== Mexico vs South Korea ===
The sides have previously met 15 times including twice in the World Cup, with Mexico winning both matches: 3–1 in the 1998 tournament in France, and 2–1 in the 2018 edition in Russia. Their most recent meeting was a 2–2 draw in 2025.

In the 50th minute, South Korean goalkeeper Kim Seung-gyu spilled the ball after a collision with his own player, Lee Gi-hyuk. The ball fell to Mexico's Luis Romo allowing him to hook it back into an empty net.

With the 1–0 win, Mexico became the first team to qualify for the newly introduced round of 32.

June 18, 2026
7:00 p.m. UTC−6

Mexico	1–0	South Korea
Romo 50'	(Note: "Mexico vs Korea Republic | First Stage | FIFA World Cup 2026". FIFA. Retrieved June 19, 2026.; "Match Report – Group A – Mexico v. Korea Republic". FIFA. June 19, 2026. Retrieved June 19, 2026.; "Post match summary report – Group A – Mexico v. Korea Republic". FIFA. June 18, 2026. Retrieved June 19, 2026.)

Estadio Akron, Zapopan
Attendance: 45,522
Referee: Gustavo Tejera (Uruguay)

Mexico	South Korea

GK	1	Raúl Rangel
RB	2	Jorge Sánchez
CB	4	Edson Álvarez (c)
CB	5	Johan Vásquez
LB	23	Jesús Gallardo
DM	6	Érik Lira
CM	26	Brian Gutiérrez	(substituted off) 71'
CM	7	Luis Romo	(substituted off) 71'
RF	25	Roberto Alvarado	(substituted off) 80'
CF	9	Raúl Jiménez	(substituted off) 80'
LF	16	Julián Quiñones	(substituted off) 84'
Substitutions:
MF	17	Orbelín Pineda	(substituted on) 71'
MF	18	Obed Vargas	(substituted on) 71'
FW	11	Santiago Giménez	(substituted on) 80'
DF	15	Israel Reyes	(substituted on) 80'
FW	21	César Huerta	(substituted on) 84'
Manager:
Javier Aguirre

GK	1	Kim Seung-gyu
CB	2	Lee Han-beom
CB	4	Kim Min-jae
CB	3	Lee Gi-hyuk
RM	15	Kim Moon-hwan		(substituted off) 71'
CM	8	Paik Seung-ho	(yellow card) 58'	(substituted off) 77'
CM	6	Hwang In-beom
LM	22	Seol Young-woo		(substituted off) 71'
RF	19	Lee Kang-in	(yellow card) 4'
CF	7	Son Heung-min (c)		(substituted off) 57'
LF	10	Lee Jae-sung		(substituted off) 57'
Substitutions:
MF	11	Hwang Hee-chan		(substituted on) 57'
FW	18	Oh Hyeon-gyu		(substituted on) 57'
MF	25	Eom Ji-sung		(substituted on) 71'
MF	20	Yang Hyun-jun		(substituted on) 71'
FW	9	Cho Gue-sung		(substituted on) 77'
Manager:
Hong Myung-bo

Man of the Match:
Luis Romo (Mexico)

Assistant referees:
Carlos Barreiro (Uruguay)
Nicolás Tarán (Uruguay)
Fourth official:
Andrés Rojas (Colombia)
Reserve assistant referee:
Alexander Guzmán (Colombia)
Video assistant referee:
Leodán González (Uruguay)
Assistant video assistant referee:
Antonio García (Uruguay)
Support video assistant referee:
Jérôme Brisard (France)

=== Czech Republic vs Mexico ===
The teams only played each other once in 2000, a 2–1 win for the Czechs. Czechoslovakia played Mexico at the 1962 FIFA World Cup in a match in which Czechoslovakia scored after just 15 seconds, the second-fastest goal in World Cup history. However, Mexico came back to win 3–1. Their other two meetings saw both teams win once in friendlies.

By defeating the Czech Republic 3–0, Mexico won all three World Cup group stage matches for the first time in its history. This achievement left Mexico as the only co-host to secure a perfect group stage record, following Canada's 2–1 loss to Switzerland and the United States 3–2 defeat against Turkey. Additionally, they were one of only three teams in the tournament to achieve a perfect nine-point streak, alongside France and defending champions Argentina. Czechia were eliminated from the tournament after losing their second group game, and South Africa defeated South Korea to claim second place in the group.

Additionally, Guillermo Ochoa secured his sixth FIFA World Cup squad selection, joining Lionel Messi of Argentina and Cristiano Ronaldo of Portugal in achieving this historic milestone.

June 24, 2026
7:00 p.m. UTC−6

Czech Republic	0–3	Mexico
	(Note: "Czechia vs Mexico | First Stage | FIFA World Cup 2026". FIFA. Retrieved June 25, 2026.; "Match Report – Group A – Czechia v. Mexico". FIFA. June 25, 2026. Retrieved June 25, 2026.; "Post match summary report – Group A – Czechia v. Mexico". FIFA. June 25, 2026. Retrieved June 25, 2026.)	M. Chávez 55'; Quiñones 61'; Fidalgo 90+4'

Estadio Azteca, Mexico City
Attendance: 80,824
Referee: Yael Falcón (Argentina)

Czech Republic	Mexico

GK	1	Matěj Kovář
CB	3	Tomáš Holeš	(substituted off) 64'
CB	4	Robin Hranáč
CB	7	Ladislav Krejčí (c)
RWB	5	Vladimír Coufal
LWB	21	David Douděra
CM	18	Michal Sadílek
CM	12	Lukáš Červ	(substituted off) 87'
RF	26	Denis Višinský	(substituted off) 56'
CF	9	Adam Hložek	(substituted off) 64'
LF	15	Pavel Šulc
Substitutions:
MF	17	Lukáš Provod	(substituted on) 56'
FW	10	Patrik Schick	(substituted on) 64'
MF	22	Tomáš Souček	(substituted on) 64'	(substituted off) 87'
FW	19	Tomáš Chorý	(substituted on) 87'
MF	24	Alexandr Sojka	(substituted on) 87'
Manager:
Miroslav Koubek

GK	1	Raúl Rangel		(substituted off) 78'
RB	2	Jorge Sánchez
CB	3	César Montes
CB	4	Edson Álvarez (c)	(yellow card) 64'
LB	20	Mateo Chávez		(substituted off) 78'
DM	15	Israel Reyes
CM	19	Gilberto Mora		(substituted off) 72'
CM	7	Luis Romo		(substituted off) 63'
RF	25	Roberto Alvarado
CF	22	Guillermo Martínez		(substituted off) 63'
LF	16	Julián Quiñones
Substitutions:
FW	11	Santiago Giménez		(substituted on) 63'
MF	18	Obed Vargas		(substituted on) 63'
MF	8	Álvaro Fidalgo		(substituted on) 72'
GK	13	Guillermo Ochoa		(substituted on) 78'
DF	23	Jesús Gallardo		(substituted on) 78'
Manager:
Javier Aguirre

Man of the Match:
Mateo Chávez (Mexico)

Assistant referees:
Maximiliano Del Yesso (Argentina)
Facundo Rodríguez (Argentina)
Fourth official:
Cristián Garay (Chile)
Reserve assistant referee:
José Retamal (Chile)
Video assistant referee:
Juan Lara (Chile)
Assistant video assistant referee:
Rodolpho Toski (Brazil)
Support video assistant referee:
Ivan Bebek (Croatia)

=== South Africa vs South Korea ===
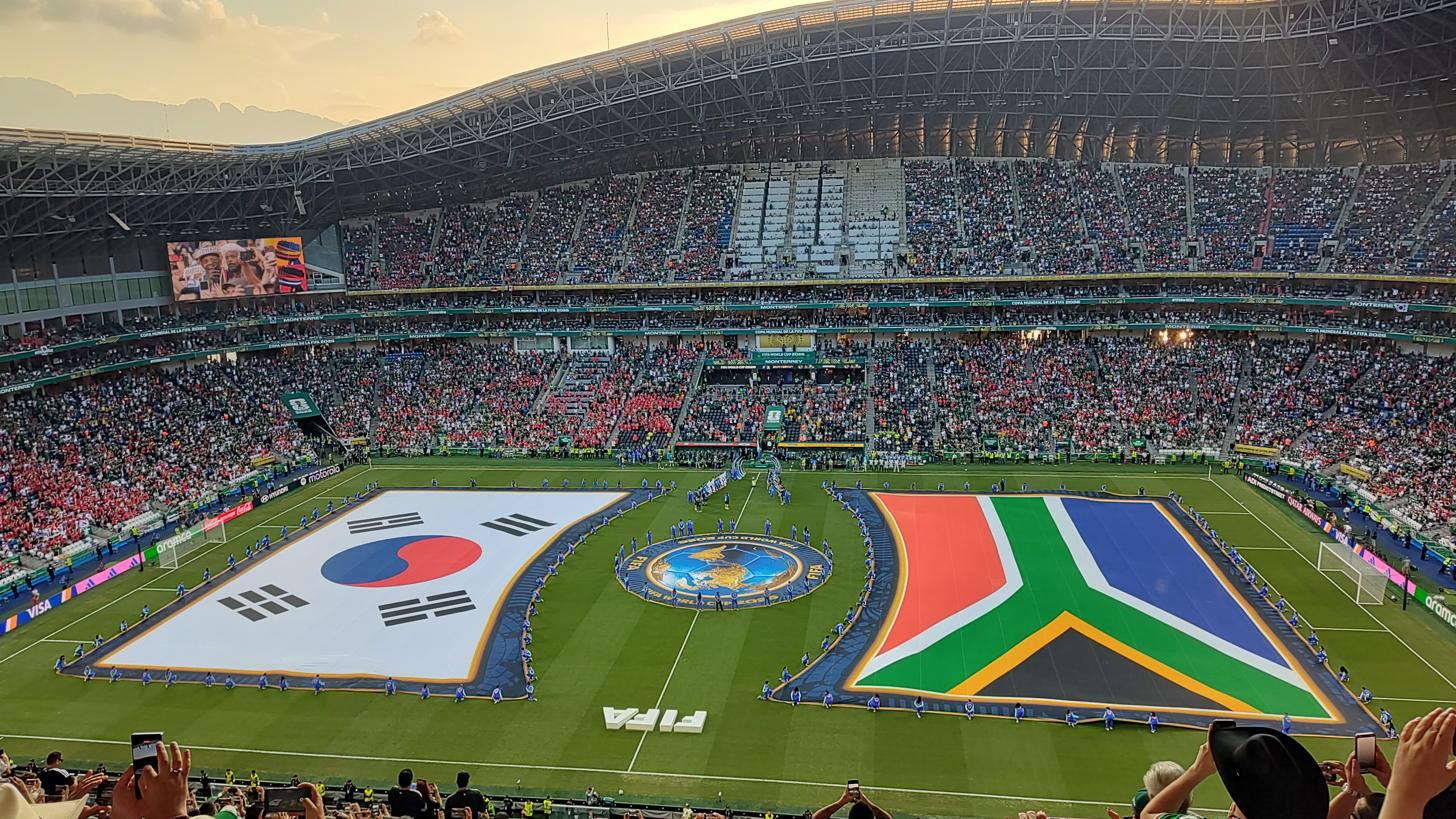
Pre-match ceremony between South Africa and South Korea

The two teams had never met before.

In the 63rd minute, Thapelo Maseko received the ball on the right before shooting left-footed low into the right corner of the net from twelve yards out.

With a 1–0 victory, South Africa qualified for the knockout stages of a World Cup for the first time, as runners-up of Group A, while South Korea finished in third and was ultimately eliminated from the group stage as a result of their third-place ranking dropping down after other group results were finalized.

South Korea's exit from the tournament prompted head coach Hong Myung-bo to resign on June 28, amid fierce public backlash that included sharp condemnation from President Lee Jae-myung. His lack of tactical flexibility shocked South Korean media and fans, and he was strongly criticized for overseeing a group-stage elimination at the World Cup for the second time, following his previous failure in 2014 after losses against Algeria and Belgium.

June 24, 2026
7:00 p.m. UTC−6

South Africa	1–0	South Korea
Maseko 63'	(Note: "South Africa vs Korea Republic | First Stage | FIFA World Cup 2026". FIFA. Retrieved June 25, 2026.; "Match Report – Group A – South Africa v. Korea Republic". FIFA. June 25, 2026. Retrieved June 25, 2026.; "Post match summary report – Group A – South Africa v. Korea Republic". FIFA. June 25, 2026. Retrieved June 25, 2026.)

Estadio BBVA, Guadalupe
Attendance: 51,243
Referee: Facundo Tello (Argentina)

South Africa	South Korea

GK	1	Ronwen Williams (c)
RB	20	Khuliso Mudau
CB	21	Ime Okon
CB	14	Mbekezeli Mbokazi
LB	6	Aubrey Modiba	(yellow card) 72'
CM	13	Sphephelo Sithole
CM	5	Thalente Mbatha
RW	12	Thapelo Maseko		(substituted off) 75'
AM	10	Relebohile Mofokeng		(substituted off) 80'
LW	7	Oswin Appollis		(substituted off) 62'
CF	17	Evidence Makgopa
Substitutions:
FW	8	Tshepang Moremi		(substituted on) 62'
FW	15	Iqraam Rayners		(substituted on) 75'
MF	23	Jayden Adams		(substituted on) 80'
Manager:
(Belgium) Hugo Broos

GK	1	Kim Seung-gyu
CB	2	Lee Han-beom
CB	4	Kim Min-jae (c)		(substituted off) 65'
CB	3	Lee Gi-hyuk
RM	22	Seol Young-woo
CM	6	Hwang In-beom
CM	8	Paik Seung-ho		(substituted off) 46'
LM	13	Lee Tae-seok		(substituted off) 46'
RF	19	Lee Kang-in
CF	18	Oh Hyeon-gyu		(substituted off) 74'
LF	11	Hwang Hee-chan		(substituted off) 46'
Substitutions:
FW	7	Son Heung-min		(substituted on) 46'
MF	24	Kim Jin-gyu		(substituted on) 46'
DF	23	Jens Castrop		(substituted on) 46'
DF	16	Park Jin-seob		(substituted on) 65'
FW	9	Cho Gue-sung	(yellow card) 78'	(substituted on) 74'
Manager:
Hong Myung-bo

Man of the Match:
Thapelo Maseko (South Africa)

Assistant referees:
Juan Pablo Belatti (Argentina)
Gabriel Chade (Argentina)
Fourth official:
Andrés Rojas (Colombia)
Reserve assistant referee:
Alexander Guzmán (Colombia)
Video assistant referee:
Hernán Mastrángelo (Argentina)
Assistant video assistant referee:
Nicolás Gallo (Colombia)
Support video assistant referee:
Bastian Dankert (Germany)

== Discipline ==
The team conduct ("fair play") score would have been used as a tiebreaker if the head-to-head and overall records of teams were tied. It would also be used as a tiebreaker for the third-place ranking between groups if the overall records of teams were tied. The score was calculated based on yellow and red cards received by players and team officials in all group matches as follows:

- yellow card: −1 point;
- indirect red card (second yellow card): −3 points;
- direct red card: −4 points;
- yellow card and direct red card: −5 points;

Only one of the above deductions could be applied to a player or team official in a single match.

Team	Match 1				Match 2				Match 3				Score
Team	Booked	(yellow card) (yellow-red card)	Sent off (straight red)	(yellow card) (red card)	Booked	(yellow card) (yellow-red card)	Sent off (straight red)	(yellow card) (red card)	Booked	(yellow card) (yellow-red card)	Sent off (straight red)	(yellow card) (red card)	Score
Czech Republic					1								–1
South Korea	1				2				1				−4
Mexico	1		1						1				−6
South Africa	2		2		2				1				−13
