= 2026 MTN 8 =

Tournament details
- Teams: 8

Final positions
- Champions: Mamelodi Sundowns
- Runners-up: Orlando Pirates

Tournament statistics
- Matches played: 9
- Goals scored: 28 (3.11 per match)
- Top goal scorers: Antonio Van Wyk (2 goals); Cassius Mailula (2 goals); Gamphani Lungu (2 goals); Junior Dion (2 goals); Thandolwenkosi Ngwenya (2 goals)

The 2026 MTN 8 was the 52nd edition of the South African soccer competition featuring the top 8-placed teams at the conclusion of the previous Premiership season, and the 19th under its current sponsored name. The competition started on 8 August 2026 and finished on 10 October 2026.

Prize money was be R10 million for the winners and R1 million each for the other 7 participants. Orlando Pirates were four time defending champions, and were attempting to become the first club to win the title for five consecutive seasons. Pirates lost in the final to Mamelodi Sundowns.

== Teams ==
The following 8 teams are listed according to their final position on the league table in the previous season of the 2025–26 Premiership.

1. Orlando Pirates
2. Mamelodi Sundowns
3. Kaizer Chiefs
4. AmaZulu
5. Sekhukhune United
6. Golden Arrows
7. Polokwane City
8. Durban City

== Quarter-finals ==
8 August 2026	Orlando Pirates	2–1 (a.e.t.)	Durban City	Soweto
15:00 SAST	K. Sebelebele (yellow card) 12'; P. Maswanganyi 37' (pen.); S. Masilela (yellow card) 113'; G. Lungu 120'	Report	B. Poggenpoel (red card) 35'; J. Lwamba 52'; G. Sirino (yellow card) 54'; S. Maseko (yellow card) 100'; F. Asare (yellow card) 108'	Stadium: Orlando Stadium; Referee: Alfred Chavani; Man of the Match: Siphamandla Ncanana

8 August 2026	Mamelodi Sundowns	3–2 (a.e.t.)	Polokwane City	Atteridgeville
18:00 SAST	T. Mokoena 20'; A. van Wyk 30'; T. Matthews (yellow card) 35'; K. Letlhaku (yellow card) 90'; C. Mailula 112'	Report	B. Dlamini 6'; M. Kambala (yellow card) 46'; T. Molokwane 59'; S. Manthosi (yellow card) 85'	Stadium: Lucas Moripe Stadium; Referee: Philangenkosi Khumalo; Man of the Match: Marcelo Allende

9 August 2026	AmaZulu	3–4 (a.e.t.)	Sekhukhune United	Chatsworth
15:00 SAST	T. Ngwenya 14' 56'; T. Fielies 58'	Report	T. Mokoane 44'; G. Khupe 53'; M. Rammala 54'; V. Letlapa (yellow card) 78'; T. Matsimbi (yellow card) 87'; V. Letlapa 98'; K. Tlaka (yellow card) 108'	Stadium: Chatsworth Stadium

9 August 2026	Kaizer Chiefs	0–1	Golden Arrows	Soweto
18:00 SAST			K. Shezi 53'	Stadium: FNB Stadium

== Semi-finals ==
1st leg

22 August 2026 1st Leg	Sekhukhune United	0–1	Orlando Pirates	Polokwane
15:00 SAST			Deon Hotto 44'	Stadium: Old Peter Mokaba Stadium; Man of the Match: Deon Hotto

23 August 2026 1st Leg	Mamelodi Sundowns	0–1	Golden Arrows	Atteridgeville
15:00 SAST			Dion 38'	Stadium: Lucas Moripe Stadium

2nd leg

29 August 2026 2nd Leg	Orlando Pirates	3–0	Sekhukhune United	Soweto
15:00 SAST	Thapelo Mokobodi 37' Gamphani Lungu 39' Kamogelo Sebelebele 90+3'			Stadium: Orlando Stadium; Man of the Match: Thapelo Mokobodi

Orlando Pirates 4–0 won on aggregate

30 August 2026 2nd Leg	Golden Arrows	2–3	Mamelodi Sundowns	Umlazi
15:00 SAST	Junior Dion 69' Philani Khumalo 90+1'		Cassius Mailula 31' Marcelo Allende 77' Antonio Van Wyk 85'	Stadium: King Zwelithini Stadium; Man of the Match: Marcelo Allende

3–3 on aggregate; Mamelodi Sundowns won on away goals.

== Final ==
10 October 2026	Orlando Pirates	0–2	Mamelodi Sundowns	Durban
18:00 SAST		Report	T. Mokoena 11' Rayners 90+5'	Stadium: Moses Mabhida Stadium
