= Premiership Player of the Month =

The Premiership Player of the Month is an association football award that recognises the best adjudged Premiership player each month of the season.

== Winners ==
Month	Year	Player	Nationality	Pos.	Club	Ref.
May	2024	Tshegofatso Mabaso	South Africa	FW	Orlando Pirates	
September/October	2024	Lucas Ribeiro	Brazil	FW	Mamelodi Sundowns	
November/December	2024	Iqraam Rayners	South Africa	FW	Mamelodi Sundowns	
January	2025	Andy Boyeli	DR Congo	FW	Sekhukhune United	
February	2025	Lucas Ribeiro	Brazil	FW	Mamelodi Sundowns	
March	2025	Elvis Chipezeze	Zimbabwe	GK	Magesi.	
April	2025	Keletso Makgalwa	South Africa	MF	Sekhukhune United	
May	2025	Lucas Ribeiro	Brazil	FW	Mamelodi Sundowns	
August	2025	Puso Dithejane	South Africa	MF	TS Galaxy	
September/October	2025	Siyanda Ndlovu	South Africa	MF	Lamontville Golden Arrows	
November/December	2025	Puso Dithejane	South Africa	MF	TS Galaxy	
Janaury/February	2026	Relebohile Mofokeng	South Africa	MF	Orlando Pirates	
March	2026	Relebohile Mofokeng	South Africa	MF	Orlando Pirates	
April	2026	Oswin Appollis	South Africa	MF	Orlando Pirates	
May	2026	Sipho Chaine	South Africa	GK	Orlando Pirates	
August	2026	Thandolwenkosi Ngwenya	Zimbabwe	MF	AmaZulu	
September/October	2026	Thapelo Mokobodi	South Africa	MF	Orlando Pirates	

== Multiple winners ==
The following table lists the number of awards won by players who have won at least two Player of the Month awards.

Players in bold are still active in PSL while players in italic are still active outside PSL.

Rank	Player	Wins
1st	Lucas Ribeiro	3
2nd	Puso Dithejane	2
2nd	Relebohile Mofokeng	2

== Awards won by nationality ==
Nationality	Players	Wins
South Africa	9	11
Brazil	1	3
Zimbabwe	2	2
DR Congo	1	1
