= Thapelo Mokobodi =

South African soccer player (born 2002)

Personal information
- Full name: Thapelo Paulos Mokobodi
- Date of birth: 11 November 2002 (age 24)
- Place of birth: Sebokeng or Soweto, South Africa
- Height: 1.78 m (5 ft 10 in)
- Positions: Midfielder; right-back

Team information
- Current team: Orlando Pirates
- Number: 33

Youth career
- Black Poison

Senior career*
| Years | Team | Apps | (Gls) |
| 2023–2025 | Marumo Gallants | 21 | (2) |
| 2025–2026 | Stellenbosch | 19 | (0) |
| 2026– | Orlando Pirates | 8 | (0) |
- * Club domestic league appearances and goals

Thapelo Paulos Mokobodi (born 11 November 2002) is a South African professional soccer player who plays as a midfielder and right-back for the South African Premiership club Orlando Pirates.

== Early life ==
Mokobodi was born in Sebokeng or Soweto on 11 November 2002. He was a player for the Soweto-based amateur team Black Poison coached by Rhulani Mokwena.

== Club career ==
=== Marumo Gallants ===
Mokobodi joined Marumo Gallants in September 2023. He played for Marumo Gallants in the 2023–24 National First Division, the 2024–25 South African Premiership, and the 2024–25 CAF Confederation Cup. He made 24 appearances in all competitions for Marumo Gallants in his final season.

=== Stellenbosch ===
Mokobodi joined Stellenbosch in August 2025. Mokobodi made 28 appearances in all competitions in his only season for Stellenbosch.

=== Orlando Pirates ===
On 29 July 2026, Mokobodi joined Orlando Pirates as their ninth signing of summer transfer window before the start of the 2026–27 South African Premiership on a three-year contract until 30 June 2029. He reunited with Abdeslam Ouaddou, who had previously coached him for a time with Marumo Gallants. Injuries to Thalente Mbatha and Sihle Nduli brought Mokobodi into the spotlight earlier than anticipated. He was the South African Premiership Player of the Month for September and October 2026.

== Career statistics ==
=== Club ===
As of match played 7 November 2026

Appearances by club, season and competition
| Club | Season | League | | | Nedbank Cup | | Knockout Cup | | Continental (Note: Includes the 2025–26 CAF Confederation Cup and the 2026–27 CAF Champions League.) | | MTN 8 | | Total | |
| Club | Season | Division | Apps | Goals | Apps | Goals | Apps | Goals | Apps | Goals | Apps | Goals | Apps | Goals |
|---|---|---|---|---|---|---|---|---|---|---|---|---|---|---|
| Marumo Gallants | 2023–24 | National First Division | 2 | 2 | 1 | 0 | – | | – | | — | | 3 | 2 |
| Marumo Gallants | 2024–25 | South African Premiership | 19 | 0 | 3 | 0 | 2 | 0 | — | | — | | 24 | 0 |
| Marumo Gallants | Total | | 21 | 2 | 4 | 0 | 2 | 0 | – | | – | | 27 | 2 |
| Stellenbosch | 2025–26 | South African Premiership | 19 | 0 | 0 | 0 | 1 | 0 | 6 | 0 | 2 | 0 | 28 | 0 |
| Orlando Pirates | 2026–27 | South African Premiership | 8 | 0 | 0 | 0 | 2 | 1 | 1 | 0 | 4 | 1 | 14 | 2 |
| Career total | | | 48 | 2 | 4 | 0 | 5 | 1 | 7 | 0 | 6 | 1 | 69 | 4 |
