= Thabiso Sesane =

South African association football player (born 2000)

Personal information
- Date of birth: 30 October 2000 (age 25)
- Height: 5 ft 11 in (1.80 m)
- Position: Defender

Team information
- Current team: Siwelele FC
- Number: 4

Youth career
- –2020: Orlando Pirates

Senior career*
Years	Team	Apps	(Gls)
2020-2026	Orlando Pirates	35	(1)
2021-2022	→ Jomo Cosmos (loan)	15	(0)
2022-2023	→ All Stars FC (loan)	29	(0)
2026-	Siwelele F.C.	5	(0)
- * Club domestic league appearances and goals as of 20:17, 3 October 2026 (UTC)

Thabiso Sesane (born 30 May 2000) is a South African soccer player who plays as a defender for South African Premier Division side Siwelele F.C..

== Club career ==
From Snake Park in Soweto, he began his career at Orlando Pirates and played with their reserve team Pele Pele in the PSL Reserve League. He plays as a defender.

He was promoted to the Orlando Pirates senior team for the 2020-21 season. In the 2021-22 season he played in the Motsepe Foundation Championship for Jomo Cosmos. The following season he played on-loan at All Stars FC. After returning to Orlando Pirates he helped the club win the 2023–24 Nedbank Cup and the 2024 MTN 8. He also featured for the club in the CAF Champions League.Then in July 2026 he was signed by Siwelele F.C..

== International career ==
He was called-up to the South Africa national football team for their 2025 AFCON qualification matches against Congo on 11 and 14 October 2024.
