= Mohau Nkota =

South African soccer player (born 2004)

Personal information
- Full name: Mohau Takatso Nkota
- Date of birth: 9 November 2004 (age 21)
- Place of birth: Kimberley, South Africa
- Height: 1.68 m (5 ft 6 in)
- Position: Winger

Team information
- Current team: Al-Ettifaq
- Number: 15

Youth career
- –2024: Orlando Pirates

Senior career*
Years	Team	Apps	(Gls)
2024–2025	Orlando Pirates	25	(3)
2025–	Al-Ettifaq	7	(2)
2026–	Orlando Pirates (loan)	0	(0)

International career^{‡}
2025–	South Africa	7	(2)
- * Club domestic league appearances and goals as of 31 October 2025 ‡ National team caps and goals as of 15 November 2025

Mohau Takatso Nkota (born 9 November 2004) is a South African footballer who plays as a winger for South Africa Premier Division side Orlando Pirates on loan from Al-Ettifaq and the South Africa national team.

== Club career ==
=== Orlando Pirates ===
Nkota played for Orlando Pirates Reserve side in the PSL Reserve League. He made his senior debut on 25 October 2024 against AmaZulu and scored a brace in a 2–1 win for the Buccaneers. He won the MTN 8 title with the team in 2024.

==== CAF Champions League ====
He scored a brace in his continental debut in a 2–1 win over CR Belouizdad from Algeria in the 2024–25 CAF Champions League. He also scored the winning goal in a 1–0 win against MC Alger from Algeria in the first leg of the quarter finals in the 2024–25 CAF Champions League.

=== Al-Ettifaq ===
He was announced as an Al-Ettifaq FC player on 13 July 2025, posted by the Al-Ettifaq website. He scored on debut in a 2–1 win over Al Kholood.

In September 2026, Nkota rejoined Orlando Pirates on a season-loan deal for the 2026-27 season.

== International career ==
He made his senior international debut against Tanzania on 6 June 2025.

On 1 December 2025, Nkota was called up to the South Africa squad for the 2025 Africa Cup of Nations.

== Career statistics ==
=== International ===
As of match played 15 November 2025

No.	Date	Venue	Cap	Opponent	Score	Result	Competition	Ref.
1.	5 September 2025	Free State Stadium, Bloemfontein, South Africa	3	Lesotho	1–0	3–0	2026 FIFA World Cup qualification	
2.	15 November 2025	Nelson Mandela Bay Stadium, Gqeberha, South Africa	7	Zambia	2–0	3–1	Friendly	

== Honours ==
Orlando Pirates

- MTN 8: 2024
