= Abdeslam Ouaddou =

Moroccan football manager (born 1978)

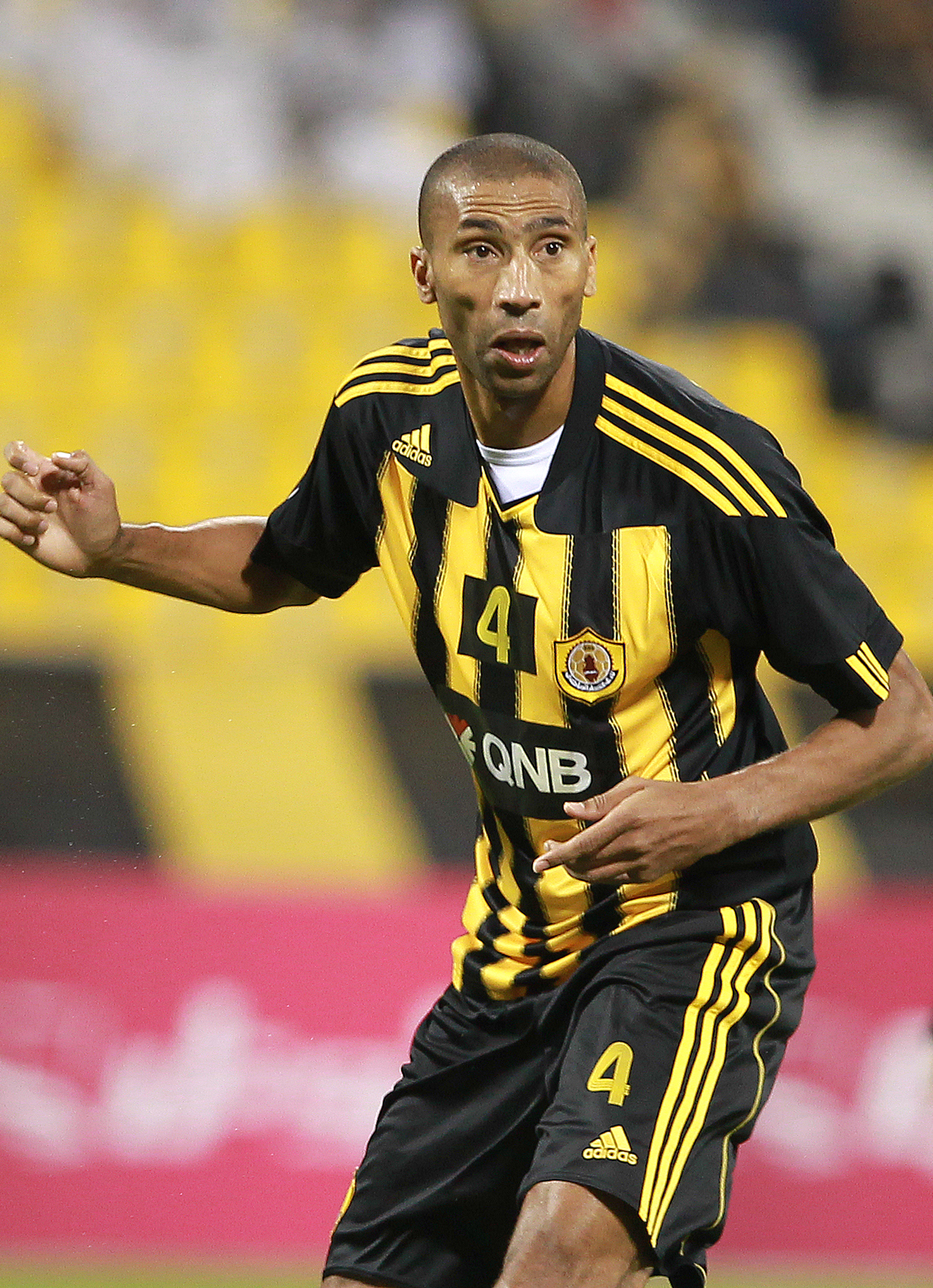
- Ouaddou playing for Qatar SC.

Personal information
- Date of birth: 1 November 1978 (age 47)
- Place of birth: Alnif, Morocco
- Height: 1.91 m (6 ft 3 in)
- Position: Centre-back

Team information
- Current team: Orlando Pirates (head coach)

Senior career*
Years	Team	Apps	(Gls)
1999–2001	Nancy	47	(0)
2001–2005	Fulham	21	(0)
2003–2005	→ Rennes (loan)	63	(4)
2005	Rennes	18	(1)
2006	Olympiacos	6	(0)
2006–2008	Valenciennes	42	(0)
2008–2010	Nancy	44	(1)
2010–2011	Lekhwiya	26	(2)
2011–2012	Qatar SC	18	(2)
2013	Nancy	0	(0)
Total		285	(10)

International career
2000–2009	Morocco	58	(3)

Managerial career
- 2020–2021: MC Oujda
- 2021–2023: Loto-Popo
- 2024: AS Vita Club
- 2025: Marumo Gallants
- 2025–: Orlando Pirates
Medal record
Men's football
Representing Morocco (as player)
Africa Cup of Nations
Runner-up	2004 Tunisia
- * Club domestic league appearances and goals

Abdeslam Ouaddou (Arabic: عبدالسلام وادو; born 1 November 1978) is a Moroccan football manager and former player who is the manager of the South African Premiership club Orlando Pirates.

Ouaddou played as a centre-back or defensive midfielder and began his career with AS Nancy Lorraine. He won his first trophy, the 2002 UEFA Intertoto Cup, with Fulham. Later in his playing career, he had a short spell with Olympiacos, playing several games during the 2006–07 Super League Greece season, which was won by the club, before he moved to Valenciennes. He later returned to AS Nancy Lorraine, before spending three years playing in Qatar, where he won the 2010–11 Qatar Stars League with Lekhwiya. He joined his boyhood club AS Nancy Lorraine in 2013, before he ended his playing career and began working as a coach. A holder of French citizenship, he was capped 58 times for the Morocco national football team, scoring three times.

Ouaddou began his coaching career as a youth and assistant coach with AS Nancy Lorraine and later worked with the Algeria national football team. His first head coaching stint was at Mouloudia Club d'Oujda, for whom he was at the helm for four months. As a manager, he won his first trophy, the 2024 Coupe du Congo, with Association Sportive Vita Club. He was previously the head coach of the Marumo Gallants before his move to the Orlando Pirates, where he won the domestic treble in his first season, with the club having won the 2025 MTN 8, the 2025 Carling Knockout Cup, and the 2025–26 South African Premiership.

== Early life ==
Ouaddou was born in Alnif, Morocco. He and his family moved to France when he was two years old.

== Club career ==
He started his professional football career at the age of 21 with AS Nancy Lorraine. In the summer of 2001, Ouaddou was signed by the newly promoted Premier League club Fulham for £8 million, on a four-year contract. However, Ouaddou did not settle in England and spent the last two years of his contract on loan at Rennes, before joining the French club permanently once his contract expired.

In summer 2006, Ouaddou signed for Olympiacos. After disappointing appearances with the team, he was relegated to the bench. On 7 December 2006, he asked Olympiacos to be released from his contract due to homesickness and family issues. Ouaddou later returned to France.

On 1 January 2007, the opening day of the January transfer window, Ouaddou joined Valenciennes on a free transfer. After one season with Valenciennes, he transferred to his former club Nancy for a fee of £150,000. He was voted the club's best signing for the 2008–09 campaign.

On 30 June 2010, Ouaddou left AS Nancy Lorraine after a dispute with the Ligue 1 outfit. He had a deal until 2012 but he was sacked by the club for gross misconduct after refusing to train and publicly criticising the club.

In 2010, signed a two-year contract with Lekhwiya in the Qatar Stars League. He won the 2010–11 Qatar Stars League with the club. According to Ouaddou, he was forced to leave the club upon his return to Qatar from his time on holiday in France by the order of Tamim bin Hamad Al Thani. He was later placed on another team owned by Al Thani, Qatar SC.

It was announced on 8 August 2011, that Qatar SC had signed him for a two-year deal. He commented on the move, stating "I'm more than pleased to have extended my stay in the Qatar Stars League and move to another big club". After his first season with Qatar SC, Ouaddou went on holiday in France and upon his return, club officials desired to terminate his contract but offered him only a one month salary as compensation. Ouaddou said he was forced to train at the hottest times of the day and was removed from the professional squad before the team stopped paying him altogether. He left Qatar SC in November 2012. In 2013, he criticized the kafala system and employment conditions in Qatar, stating "When you work in Qatar you belong to someone. You are not free. You are a slave." Ouaddou said his car was confiscated, electricity was cut off, and he was kicked out of the house he lived in with his young family, who he moved into a hotel. He believed this was due to the club attempting to make him stop going to training so his contract could be terminated for misconduct. When he turned up at the airport with his French passport, he was not permitted to obtain an exit visa without a letter of authorisation from the club. After he told his story to the BBC and CNN, Qatar SC proffered his authorisation letter to leave. He described the prohibition of migrant workers from some shopping malls in Qatar as apartheid.

On 1 January 2013, he signed a contract with his first professional club AS Nancy Lorraine for a third spell to close his career, but two weeks later he announced that he retired from professional football.

In 2014, Ouaddou won a case against Qatar SC at FIFA's dispute resolution chamber, which ordered the club to pay Ouaddou the six months salary he was owed. After his victory, Ouaddou urged all players to join FIFPRO, the trade union for professional footballers.

== International career ==
Between 2000 and 2009, Ouaddou made 58 appearances for the Morocco national team, scoring three goals. He scored his first international goal in a friendly against Burkina Faso on 15 November 2003. He scored his second goal for the country on 31 January 2004 against Benin during the 2004 African Cup of Nations. His third and final goal for Morocco was scored on 24 January 2008 against Guinea during the 2008 African Cup of Nations.

== Managerial career ==
=== Youth and assistant coach ===
Ouaddou began his coaching career as a youth and assistant coach with AS Nancy Lorraine.

Ouaddou joined the Algeria national football team as an assistant coach in 2020. Ouaddou cited a lack of response from the Royal Moroccan Football Federation to his coaching requests as a factor in his decision to join the staff of the Algeria national team, as well as his desire to learn alongside Djamel Belmadi.

=== MC Oujda ===
Ouaddou became the head coach of the Mouloudia Club d'Oujda in October 2020. He left the club in January 2021.

In 2024, the Court of Arbitration for Sport ordered the club to pay Ouaddou €802,000 and €3,070 for his legal fees.

=== Loto-Popo ===
On 4 July 2021, Ouaddou became the head coach and sporting director of Loto-Popo, which was founded the same year and is based in Grand-Popo in Benin. He was said to have a difficult relationship with the assistant coach Mathias Déguénon, who was dismissed. Ouaddou left the club on 1 August 2023. Déguénon later succeeded Ouaddou as head coach.

=== AS Vita Club ===
On 22 December 2023, it was announced Ouaddou would succeed Raoul Shungu as the head coach of Association Sportive Vita Club, a Kinshasa-based club that competes in the highest tier of football in the Democratic Republic of the Congo, during the 2023–24 Linafoot Ligue 1 season. He won his first trophy as a manager when AS Vita Club defeated Céleste FC to win the 2024 Coupe du Congo. He initially announced his resignation at a press conference on 13 September 2024, shortly after the club's loss in the first leg of the second round of the 2024–25 CAF Champions League against Stellenbosch, mentioning frustration with the club for its inability to bring four or five players to the match in South Africa due to passport or visa issues, but subsequently attempted to retract the decision and announced his intention to manage the team for the second leg against Stellenbosch. However, Amadou Diaby, the president of the club's coordination committee, formalised Ouaddou's departure from the club in a letter while acknowledging that the decision violated contractual obligations. Ouaddou was succeeded by Raoul Shungu as coach. In October 2024, Ouaddou said in an interview that he still had not officially resigned and was in talks with club officials to secure his official release from the club.

Ouaddou filed a complaint with the Court of Arbitration for Sport against the club in November 2024. In 2026, AS Vita Club was ordered to pay Ouaddou over €600,000 by the Court of Arbitration for Sport, which found the club had ended his contract without a valid reason.

=== Marumo Gallants ===
On 1 March 2025, towards the end of the 2024–25 season of the South African Premiership, Ouaddou was appointed the head coach of the Marumo Gallants replacing Dan Malesela. In his first match at the helm, the Marumo Gallants defeated the Orlando Pirates 2–0. He led the club to a tenth-place finish. He spent three months at the club, and left the club 31 May 2025.

=== Orlando Pirates ===
On 23 June 2025, Ouaddou was appointed as the new head coach of the Orlando Pirates following the departure of José Riveiro.

On 31 August 2025, after the Orlando Pirates won against Chippa United in Gqeberha, Ouaddou was on the team bus heading back from the game which stopped at the scene of a traffic collision, where several people including Ouaddou, Tapelo Xoki, and other staff members stepped off to assist the victims. Soon after, a Nissan NP200 collided with the stationary vehicles, striking five people, causing Ouaddou, Xoki, and other staff members to be hospitalised.

A few days after the accident, Ouaddou won his first trophy in the South African top flight when the Orlando Pirates won the 2025 MTN 8, and he dedicated the win to Xoki and other staff members injured in the accident. He won his second trophy with the Orlando Pirates after they won the 2025 Carling Knockout Cup and he became the second head coach of the Orlando Pirates after Ruud Krol to win the top eight and knockout competition in the same season.

At the end of the same season he won the South African Premiership with Orlando Pirates after a 14-year wait for the team, and at the 2025–26 South African Premiership awards he was awarded the coach of the season.

== Career statistics ==
=== International ===
Appearances and goals by national team and year
National team	Year	Apps	Goals
Morocco	2000	1	0
Morocco	2001	10	0
Morocco	2002	6	0
Morocco	2003	10	1
Morocco	2004	11	1
Morocco	2005	6	0
Morocco	2006	3	0
Morocco	2007	3	0
Morocco	2008	7	1
Morocco	2009	1	0
Total		58	3

Scores and results list Morocco's goal tally first, score column indicates score after each Ouaddou goal.

List of international goals scored by Abdeslam Ouaddou
No.	Date	Venue	Opponent	Score	Result	Competition
1	15 November 2003	Stade d'Honneur, Meknes, Morocco	Burkina Faso	1–0	1–0	Friendly
2	31 January 2004	Stade Taïeb El Mhiri, Sfax, Tunisia	Benin	3–0	4–0	2004 African Cup of Nations
3	24 January 2008	Ohene Djan Stadium, Accra, Ghana	Guinea	2–3	2–3	2008 Africa Cup of Nations

=== Managerial ===
As of match played 12 September 2026

Coaching record by team and tenure
Team	From	To	Record				
Team	From	To	G	W	D	L	Win %
Marumo Gallants	1 March 2025	31 May 2025	12	5	4	3	41.67
Orlando Pirates	23 June 2025	present	54	40	9	5	74.07
Total			66	45	13	8	68.18

== Honours ==
=== Player ===
==== Fulham ====
- UEFA Intertoto Cup: 2002

==== Olympiacos ====
- Super League Greece: 2006–07

==== Al-Duhail SC ====
- Qatar Stars League: 2010–11

==== Morocco ====
- Africa Cup of Nations runner-up: 2004

=== Manager ===
==== AS Vita Club ====
- Coupe du Congo: 2024

==== Orlando Pirates ====
- South African Premiership: 2025–26
- MTN 8: 2025
- Carling Black Label Cup: 2025

=== Individual ===
- 2025–26 South African Premiership: Coach of the Season
