= José Riveiro =

Spanish football manager

Personal information
- Full name: José Luis Riveiro Cabaleiro
- Date of birth: 15 September 1977 (age 49)
- Place of birth: Vigo, Spain

Managerial career
- Years: Team
- 1998–2001: CD Teis
- 2001–2003: Rápido Bouzas (youth)
- 2003–2006: CD Teis
- 2010–2014: Mondariz FC
- 2010–2011: Choco (youth)
- 2011–2014: Celta Vigo (youth)
- 2014: Honka (assistant)
- 2015–2016: PK-35 Vantaa (assistant)
- 2016–2018: HJK (assistant)
- 2019–2021: Inter Turku
- 2022–2025: Orlando Pirates
- 2025: Al Ahly
- 2026–: AIK

José Luis Riveiro Cabaleiro (born 15 September 1977) is a Spanish professional football manager who is the manager of the Swedish club AIK in Allsvenskan.

== Career ==
Born in Vigo, Galicia, Riveiro began his coaching career at an early age, and took over his first senior team, CD Teis in the regional leagues shortly after. After three years in charge of the team, he spent two seasons as an assistant and coach of Rápido de Bouzas' youth categories before returning to Teis.

In 2010, Riveiro was appointed manager of Mondariz FC in the Primeira Autonómica (sixth division), achieving promotion to the Preferente in his first campaign. While in charge of the club, he was also a coach of CD Choco and RC Celta de Vigo's youth categories.

=== Finland ===
Riveiro resigned from Mondariz in May 2014, and moved abroad in July to work at Finnish side FC Honka, as an assistant coach. In April of the following year, he moved to fellow league team PK-35 Vantaa, also as an assistant.

On 7 June 2016, Riveiro was appointed assistant manager of HJK Helsinki.

On 5 October 2018, he was named manager of FC Inter Turku. In his first season in charge, Riveiro led Inter to the 2nd position in the Veikkausliiga, qualifying the side to a European competition after six years. On 25 September 2020, he renewed his contract for the 2021 campaign. For the 2022 season, Inter replaced him with Miguel Grau.

=== Orlando Pirates ===
On 25 June 2022, Riveiro was announced as the head coach of the South African suite, Orlando Pirates FC. He then went on to help Orlando Pirates win the 2022 MTN 8 League Cup and the 2022–23 Nedbank Cup, and secured the 2nd spot in the South African Premier Division to qualify for the CAF Champions League in his first campaign. Riveiro led the club to win 2023 MTN 8 Cup and went on to defend the 2023–24 Nedbank Cup against Mamelodi Sundowns. In 2024, he made history when he became the first coach to win the MTN 8 three times consecutively after winning the 2024 edition.

In the 2024–25 season, he guided the club to a runner-up finish in both the South African Premiership and the Nedbank Cup. Additionally, he led the team to the semi-finals of the CAF Champions League, where they were narrowly defeated 3–2 on aggregate by Pyramids.

=== Al Ahly ===
In late May 2025, reports stated that Riveiro would become the head coach of Egyptian side Al Ahly ahead of their participation in the FIFA Club World Cup. On 29 May, he signed a two-year contract with the club. Al Ahly sacked him in August 2025 after a poor start to the season.

=== AIK ===
Riveiro was announced as the head coach of the Swedish club AIK in January 2026.

== Managerial statistics ==
As of 21 November 2026

Managerial record by team and tenure
Team	Nat	From	To	Record							
Team	Nat	From	To	G	W	D	L	GF	GA	GD	Win %
Inter Turku	(Finland)	1 January 2019	31 December 2021	102	55	14	33	160	107	+53	53.92
Orlando Pirates	(South Africa)	1 July 2022	13 May 2025	131	80	26	25	213	96	+117	61.07
Al Ahly	(Egypt)	29 May 2025	31 August 2025	7	1	4	2	10	11	−1	14.29
AIK	(Sweden)	16 January 2026	present	34	14	9	11	58	56	+2	41.18
Total				274	150	53	71	441	270	+171	54.74

== Managerial honours ==
Orlando Pirates

- Nedbank Cup: 2022–23, 2023–24
- Nedbank Cup runner-up: 2024–25
- MTN 8: 2022, 2023, 2024
