= Puso Dithejane =

South African soccer player (born 2004)

Personal information
- Date of birth: 24 July 2004 (age 22)
- Place of birth: Christiana, North West, South Africa
- Height: 1.83 m (6 ft 0 in)
- Position: Winger

Team information
- Current team: Chicago Fire
- Number: 12

Youth career
- –2021: Transnet School of Excellence
- 2021–2023: Kaizer Chiefs

Senior career*
Years	Team	Apps	(Gls)
2024–2026	TS Galaxy	52	(7)
2026–	Chicago Fire	27	(3)
2026–	Chicago Fire II	3	(1)

International career^{‡}
2022–2024	South Africa U20		
2025–2026	South Africa B		
2026–	South Africa	1	(1)
- * Club domestic league appearances and goals ‡ National team caps and goals as of 23:05, 4 October 2026 (UTC)

Puso Dithejane (born 24 July 2004) is a South African professional soccer player who plays as a winger for Major League Soccer side Chicago Fire and the South Africa national team.

== Club career ==
Dithejane is a product of the Kaizer Chiefs Academy and played in the PSL Reserve.

=== TS Galaxy ===
In 2024, Dithejane signed with South African Premiership side TS Galaxy F.C. In his first 13 appearances for the club 12 were from the starting line-up. He scored the winner against AmaZulu in December 2024. He was instrumental in a 2–1 win over Golden Arrows scoring the opening goal and assisting the winner for The Rockets in Mbombela in November 2025.

He was named Betway Premiership player of the month in August, November, and December 2025.

=== Chicago Fire ===
In January 2026, Dithejane signed with Major League Soccer side Chicago Fire on a four-and-a-half year deal running till June 2030. Later that year, on 22 July, he scored his first goal in a 3–2 away defeat against Inter Miami. Dithejane then scored both goals in the Fire's 2–1 win over Mexican champion Cruz Azul in the Leagues Cup.

He was also named the Chicago Fire player of the month for July/August. In November 2026, he came of the bench and scored 36 seconds later to extend Fire's lead in a 4–2 win against Colorado Rapids.

== International career ==
He competed for the South Africa U-20 side at the 2022 COSAFA U-20 Cup where they finished in third place. He was named in the tournaments best XI. Dithejane played for the South Africa B team at the 2025 COSAFA Cup where they finished as runners-up to Angola.

Dithejane received his first senior national team call‑up in September 2026 and made his debut on 4 October 2026 in a friendly against Egypt, where he scored the winning goal to secure a 1–0 victory for South Africa.

=== International goals ===
No.	Date	Venue	Opponent	Score	Result	Competition
1.	4 October 2026	Cairo International Stadium, Cairo, Egypt	Egypt	1–0	1–0	Friendly

== Honours ==
South Africa

- COSAFA Cup runner-up: 2025
- COSAFA U-20 Challenge third place: 2022

Individual

- COSAFA U-20 Cup Best XI: 2022
- Premiership Player of the Month: August, November, December 2025
- Chicago Fire Player of the month: July/August 2026
