= Tapelo Xoki =

South African soccer player

Personal information
- Birth name: Thapelo Nyongo
- Date of birth: 10 April 1995 (age 31)
- Place of birth: Khayelitsha, South Africa
- Height: 1.85 m (6 ft 1 in)
- Position: Defender

Team information
- Current team: Orlando Pirates
- Number: 27

Youth career
- –2012: Cape Town Liverpool
- 2012–2014: Old Mutual Academy

Senior career*
Years	Team	Apps	(Gls)
2014–2022	AmaZulu	138	(9)
2022–	Orlando Pirates	59	(3)

International career^{‡}
2024	South Africa	1	(0)
- * Club domestic league appearances and goals as of 3 January 2026 ‡ National team caps and goals as of 21 March 2024

Thapelo Xoki (born Thapelo Nyongo; 10 April 1995) is a South African soccer player who plays as a defender for South African Premiership side Orlando Pirates. He has been capped once by the South Africa national team.

== Early and personal life ==
He was born on 10 April 1995 in Khayelitsha in the city of Cape Town. He attended Thembelihle Senior Secondary School.

He originally played football using the surname of his mother, Nyongo. He later began using the surname of his father, Xoki, after his father paid damages to his mother.

His first name has been variously spelled Tapelo or Thapelo. Both club teams he has played for professionally and the Confederation of African Football have had his first name written as Tapelo, however the South African Football Association has frequently written his first name as Thapelo.

== Club career ==
He started playing for Cape Town Liverpool before joining the Old Mutual Academy in Cape Town in 2012. He joined AmaZulu in 2014, signing his first professional contract lasting until summer 2017. He was the captain of AmaZulu.

On June 13, 2022, Xoki completed a transfer to the Orlando Pirates. He reached an agreement with the club to extend his contract by two years in April 2025. He was named vice-captain ahead of Mbekezeli Mbokazi and behind captain Nkosinathi Sibisi for the 2025–26 season.

On 31 August 2025, after the Orlando Pirates won against Chippa United in Gqeberha, the team was on a bus heading back from the game and stopped at the scene of a traffic collision, where several people including Xoki, head coach Abdeslam Ouaddou, goalkeeping coach Tyrone Damons, and other staff stepped off the bus to assist the victims. Soon after, a Nissan NP200 collided with the stationary vehicles, striking five people, causing Damons, Ouaddou, and Xoki to be hospitalised. The accident left Xoki with anterior cruciate ligament and medial collateral ligament tears.

Ouaddou dedicated the success of the Orlando Pirates in the 2025 MTN 8 tournament to Xoki and the injured club staff. Ouaddou later said he did not know if there would be a chance Xoki would make an appearance before the end of the 2025–26 season. Xoki has praised the Orlando Pirates medical team for the work they have done toward his rehabilitation and has said it is going well.

== International career ==
Xoki was initially selected by Hugo Broos for the 44-man provisional squad for the South Africa national team for the 2026 FIFA World Cup qualifiers against Benin and Rwanda in November 2023. He was not included in the official announcement of the final 23-man squad for the qualifiers by the South African Football Association, but replaced Grant Kekana after he had withdrawn from the squad due to an injury and was an unused substitute on the bench in both games. Xoki was included in the 50-man provisional list for the South Africa squad for the 2023 Africa Cup of Nations on 14 December 2023. He was later announced as one of the three reserve players put on standby for the 2023 Africa Cup of Nations, but he did not make an appearance in the tournament. He made his debut for South Africa on 21 March 2024 in a friendly against Andorra which ended in a 1–1 draw.

== Honours ==
=== Orlando Pirates ===
- MTN 8: 2022, 2023
- Nedbank Cup: 2023, 2024
