= Thalente Mbatha =

South African soccer player (born 2000)

Personal information
- Full name: Thalente Wandile Mbatha
- Date of birth: 6 March 2000 (age 26)
- Place of birth: KwaMashu, South Africa
- Height: 1.79 m (5 ft 10 in)
- Position: Central midfielder

Team information
- Current team: Orlando Pirates
- Number: 16

Youth career
- KwaMashu All Stars
- Durban FC

Senior career*
Years	Team	Apps	(Gls)
2020	Highlands Park	4	(0)
2020–2024	SuperSport United	23	(0)
2024	→ Orlando Pirates (loan)	11	(1)
2024–	Orlando Pirates	47	(3)

International career^{‡}
2024–	South Africa	20	(3)
- * Club domestic league appearances and goals as of 22 October 2026 ‡ National team caps and goals as of 22 October 2026

Thalente Wandile Mbatha (born 6 March 2000) is a South African soccer player who plays as a midfielder for South African Premiership side Orlando Pirates and the South Africa national team.

== Early life ==
Mbatha was born 6 March 2000 in KwaMashu. He attended Sastri College in Durban.

== Club career ==
He played for KwaMashu All Stars before joining Durban FC, for whom he played for six years before he signed with the South African Premiership club Highlands Park.

=== SuperSport United ===
He played for Tshwane based side SuperSport United.

=== Orlando Pirates ===
In January 2024, he joined Soweto based club Orlando Pirates on a six month contract with the option for a permanent move. He played his first final in the 2023–24 Nedbank Cup final against Mamelodi Sundowns. Mbatha was voted man of the match in the 2–1 win for Orlando Pirates. It was announced in June he would be staying with the Orlando Pirates permanently for the next season.

== International career ==
Mbatha received his first senior call-up to the South Africa national team from Hugo Broos for the 2025 Africa Cup of Nations qualifying matches against Uganda and South Sudan. He made his international debut against Uganda on 6 September 2024, coming on as a substitute for Yaya Sithole in the 81st minute and scoring in stoppage time to level the match at 2–2 and earn South Africa a draw. Four days later, he again came off the bench, this time in the final 18 minutes against South Sudan, and scored a stoppage-time winner.

Mbatha was called up to the national team by Hugo Broos for the 2025 Africa Cup of Nations. Mbatha started the group stage match against Egypt before coming on as a substitute against Zimbabwe, as South Africa advanced to the knockout stage before being eliminated by Cameroon in the round of 16.

On 14 October 2025, Mbatha scored his third international goal in a FIFA World Cup qualifier against Rwanda, sealing a victory that secured South Africa's qualification for the 2026 FIFA World Cup. Mbatha was selected by manager Hugo Broos to represent South Africa at the 2026 FIFA World Cup.

Mbatha made his World Cup debut as a substitute in a 2–0 defeat won by Mexico. He was brought into the starting line-up for the second group match against the Czech Republic after Sphephelo Sithole was sent off against Mexico. Mbatha was praised for adding composure to the midfield as South Africa drew 1–1. He retained his place for the final group stage match against South Korea, starting in a three-man midfield alongside the returning Sithole and Relebohile Mofokeng. He was substituted on for Mofokeng in the round of 16 match against Canada.

== Career statistics ==
=== International ===
As of 22 October 2026

Appearances and goals by national team and year
National team	Year	Apps	Goals
South Africa	2024	4	2
South Africa	2025	8	1
South Africa	2026	8	0
Total		20	3

No.	Date	Venue	Opponent	Score	Result	Competition
1.	6 September 2024	Orlando Stadium, Soweto, South Africa	Uganda	2–2	2–2	2025 Africa Cup of Nations qualification
2.	10 September 2024	Juba Stadium, Juba, South Sudan	South Sudan	3–2	3–2	2025 Africa Cup of Nations qualification
3.	14 October 2025	Mbombela Stadium, Mbombela, South Africa	Rwanda	1–0	3–0	2026 FIFA World Cup qualification

== Honours ==
Orlando Pirates

- Nedbank Cup: 2023-24
- MTN 8: 2024, 2025
- Carling Knockout Cup : 2025
- 2025–26 South African Premiership
