= 2023–24 Nedbank Cup =

Tournament details
- Country: South Africa
- Dates: 20 February 2024 –
- Teams: 32

Final positions
- Champions: Orlando Pirates

The 2023–24 Nedbank Cup was the 2023–24 edition of South Africa's premier knockout club football (soccer) competition, the Nedbank Cup. It was the 52nd season of the competition, and 17th under its current sponsor.

It was won by defending champions Orlando Pirates, who defeated Mamelodi Sundowns 2–1 in the final. Since both teams qualified for the 2024–25 CAF Champions League through their league position, the cup didn't grant any continental qualification, and the final slot for the 2024–25 CAF Confederation Cup was taken by the fourth-placed team in the league, Sekhukhune United.

== Participating teams ==
=== Teams ===
After a preliminary round featuring eight games between teams from the National First Division and eight games from the SAFA Second Division, the 16 winners joined the 16 teams from the Premiership to enter the main draw.

== Preliminary round ==
SAFA Second Division team Crystal Lake FC qualified after defeating Middleburg United 1–0 in the preliminary round. However, Middleburg appealed, claiming that Crystal Lake's physio was incorrectly listed on their teamsheet. Middleburg's appeal was dismissed, and Crystal Lake went through to the main draw.

== Round of 32 ==
20 February 2024	Supersport United	1–1 (2–1 p)	Cape Town City	Atteridgeville
19:00 SAST	Campbell 20'		Mayo 45+2'	Stadium: Lucas Moripe Stadium

20 February 2024	La Masia	1–6	Mamelodi Sundowns	Soweto
19:00 SAST	Johnson 36' (pen)		Sirino 18' 39' 70' Esquivel 22' Mashego 27' Maboe 29'	Stadium: Dobsonville Stadium

21 February 2024	University of Pretoria	1–0	Cape Town Spurs	Pretoria
19:00 SAST	Abrahams 38' (pen)			Stadium: Tuks Stadium

21 February 2024	Highlands Park	1–1 (4–5 p)	Sekhukhune United	Soweto
19:00 SAST	Abreu 120'		Tshibwabwa 94'	Stadium: Dobsonville Stadium

22 February 2024	AmaZulu	1–0	Royal AM	Durban
19:00 SAST	Ekstein 86'			Stadium: King Zwelithini Stadium

23 February 2024	Golden Arrows	1–2	TS Galaxy	Mpumalanga
19:00 SAST	Letsoenyo 18' (own goal)		Mojela 11' Mvelase 67'	Stadium: Mpumalanga Stadium

23 February 2024	Stellenbosch	1–1 (4–3 p)	Pretoria Callies	Stellenbosch
	Titus 66'		De Sousa 87'	Stadium: Danie Craven Stadium

24 February 2024	Crystal Lake	0–6	Orlando Pirates	Nelspruit
15:00 SAST			Ndah 4' Xoki 8'(pen) 51' Mofokeng 11' Maswanganyi 33' Mabasa 79'	Stadium: Mbombela Stadium

24 February 2024	Ravens	1–1 (3–1 p)	Spain	Durban
15:00 SAST	Mtolo 90+2'		Ntanga 47'	Stadium: Princess Magogo Stadium

24 February 2024	JDR Stars	0–1 (a.e.t.)	Hungry Lions	Soshanguve
15:00 SAST			Cwinyane 108'	Stadium: Giant Stadium

24 February 2024	Platinum City Rovers	0–0 (1–3 p)	Swallows	Vaal
15:00 SAST				Stadium: Isak Steyl Stadium

24 February 2024	Richards Bay	3–2	Polokwane City	Durban
15:00 SAST	Figuareido 32' Gumede 35' 71'		Mapfumo 29' Matuludi 55'	Stadium: King Zwelithini Stadium

25 February 2024	Maritzburg United	3–0	Paarl United	Durban
15:00 SAST	Chingi 12' Van Der Ross 70' Sithole 76'			Stadium: Princess Magogo Stadium

25 February 2024	NC Professionals	1–2	Chippa United	Upington
15:00 SAST	unknown		Eva Nga ?' Francis ?'	Stadium: Mxolisi Dicky Jacobs Stadium

25 February 2024	D'General	2–0	Madridtas	Bloemfontein
15:00 SAST				Stadium: Toyota Stadium

25 February 2024	Kaizer Chiefs	0–0 (4–5 p)	*Milford F.C.	Johannesburg
18:00 SAST				Stadium: FNB Stadium

== Round of 16 ==
15 March 2024	*Milford F.C.	1–6	Stellenbosch	Durban
19:00 SAST				Stadium: Princess Magogo Stadium

17 March 2024	Mamelodi Sundowns	2–0	Maritzburg United
18:00 SAST	Lorch 75' 90+5'

14 March 2024	Sekhukhune United	0–2	AmaZulu
19:00 SAST			Dion 25' Letsoalo 62'

16 March 2024	Chippa United	2–1	Ravens
15:00 SAST		Report

16 March 2024	Orlando Pirates	4–0	Hungry Lions	Soweto
18:00 SAST				Stadium: Orlando Stadium

13 March 2024	University of Pretoria	2–1	Swallows	Pretoria
19:00 SAST	Mohlamonyane 57'; Sibanyoni 90+2'		Mbanjwa 79'	Stadium: Tuks Stadium

16 March 2024	Richards Bay	1–3	SuperSport United
15:00 SAST

17 March 2024	D'General	0–3	TS Galaxy	Bloemfontein
15:00 SAST			Nurković 34'; Mahlangu 42'; Zwane 51'	Stadium: Free State Stadium

== Quarter-finals ==
12 April 2024	University of Pretoria	1–1 (3–4 p)	Mamelodi Sundowns	Lucas Moripe Stadium
19:00 SAST

13 April 2024	Stellenbosch	4–0	SuperSport United	Danie Craven Stadium
15:00 SAST

13 April 2024	AmaZulu	2–4	Orlando Pirates	Moses Mabhida Stadium
18:15 SAST	Ekstein 30'; Fielies 65'		Maswanganyi 45'(P) 90+4'; Dlamini 54'; Makhaula 82'

14 April 2024	TS Galaxy	0–2	Chippa United	Mbombela Stadium
15:00 SAST

== Semi-finals ==
4 May 2024	Chippa United	1–3	Orlando Pirates	Gqeberha
15:00 SAST	Kambindu 63'		Dlamini 5', 41'; Xoki 81'	Stadium: Nelson Mandela Bay Stadium

5 May 2024	Stellenbosch	1–2	Mamelodi Sundowns	Stellenbosch
15:00 SAST	Palace 81'		Mudau 11'; Lorch 74'	Stadium: Danie Craven Stadium

== Final ==
1 June 2024	Mamelodi Sundowns	1–2	Orlando Pirates	Mbombela
15H00	Zwane 54'		Maswanganyi 71'(P); Mofokeng 90+4'	Stadium: Mbombela Stadium; Referee: Skhumbuzo Gasa

== Prize money ==
Position	Prize money (R)
Champions	7,000,000
Runners-Up	2,500,000
Semi-finals	1,000,000
Quarter finals	400,000
Last 16	200,000
Last 32	100,000
