= Antonio van Wyk =

South African soccer player (born 2002)

Personal information
- Date of birth: 30 March 2002 (age 24)
- Place of birth: Cape Town, South Africa
- Height: 1.78 m (5 ft 10 in)
- Position: Midfielder

Team information
- Current team: Mamelodi Sundowns
- Number: 29

Youth career
- Ubuntu Cape Town
- Stellenbosch

Senior career*
Years	Team	Apps	(Gls)
2021–2024	Stellenbosch	63	(5)
2024–2026	SV Ried	47	(4)
2026–	Mamelodi Sundowns	2	(0)

International career^{‡}
2022–	South Africa	4	(1)
- * Club domestic league appearances and goals as of 15 August 2026 ‡ National team caps and goals as of 13:34, 18 November 2025 (UTC)

Antonio van Wyk (born 30 March 2002) is a South African soccer player who plays as a midfielder for Mamelodi Sundowns and the South Africa national football team.

== Club career ==
Following impressive performances for Stellenbosch's Challenge team, he was promoted to the senior squad in the summer of 2021 together with teammate Fuad Johnson. van Wyk and Johnson also went on trial together at Royal Antwerp in April 2022.

In September 2024, van Wyk moved to Austrian side SV Ried on a permanent transfer.

In June 2026, Van Wyk signed a long term deal with South African giants Mamelodi Sundowns.

== International career ==
van Wyk was called up to Bafana Bafana for the 2022 COSAFA Cup. Here, he featured against Mozambique and Botswana, scoring his first international goal in the victory over the latter.

== Honours ==
Mamelodi Sundowns

- MTN 8: 2026
- FIFA African–Asian–Pacific Cup: 2026
