= Thabang Matuludi =

South African soccer player (born 1999)

Personal information
- Full name: Tholo Thabang Matuludi
- Date of birth: 14 January 1999 (age 27)
- Place of birth: Ngwaritsi, South Africa
- Height: 1.89 m (6 ft 2 in)
- Position: Defender

Team information
- Current team: Mamelodi Sundowns
- Number: 22

Youth career
- 2017–2019: King Born
- 2019–2021: The Dolphins

Senior career*
Years	Team	Apps	(Gls)
2021–2026	Polokwane City	108	(10)
2026–	Mamelodi Sundowns	2	(0)

International career^{‡}
2024–	South Africa	3	(0)
- * Club domestic league appearances and goals as of 4 January 2026 ‡ National team caps and goals as of 10 February 2025

Tholo Thabang Matuludi (born 14 January 1999) is a South African soccer player who plays as a right back for Mamelodi Sundowns in the Premier Soccer League and the South Africa national team.

== Club career ==
Playing for Polokwane City in the National First Division, the team won promotion to the 2023–24 South African Premier Division where Matuludi made his first-tier debut. By the 2024 winter transfer window, Matuludi had stood out as a key player for Polokwane City. Media reported interest in the player, allegedly from Stellenbosch FC and Cape Town City. No move happened, but in the summer window, Orlando Pirates was added to the discussion.On 12 September 2026, Matuludi joined Mamelodi Sundowns to strengthen the club's right back position following an injury to Khuliso Mudau.

== International career ==
He was called up for South Africa for the 2024 COSAFA Cup, where he made his international debut against Mozambique. He played every minute of the competition until South Africa was knocked out.

On 1 December 2025, Matuludi was called up to the South Africa squad for the 2025 Africa Cup of Nations.

On 28 May 2026, he was selected by manager Hugo Broos to represent his nation at the 2026 FIFA World Cup.

== Honours ==
Mamelodi Sundowns

- MTN 8: 2026
- FIFA African–Asian–Pacific Cup: 2026
