= Junior Dion =

Ivorian footballer (born 1998)

Personal information
- Full name: Sédé Junior Dion
- Date of birth: 15 October 1998 (age 28)
- Place of birth: Côte d'Ivoire
- Height: 1.82 m (6 ft 0 in)
- Position: Striker

Team information
- Current team: Golden Arrows
- Number: 18

Senior career*
Years	Team	Apps	(Gls)
2018–2019	Williamsville AC		
2019–2020	ASEC Mimosas		
2020–2021	Jwaneng Galaxy	3	(0)
2021–2022	Marumo Gallants	29	(4)
2023-2025	AmaZulu	39	(9)
2025	→ Marumo Gallants (loan)	10	(3)
2025–	Golden Arrows	13	(7)

International career
2025–	Chad	0	(0)
- * Club domestic league appearances and goals as of 4 January 2026

Sédé Junior Dion (born 1 January 1994) is a Chadian football player who plays as a forward for Betway Premiership club Golden Arrows.

== Club career ==
=== ASEC Mimosas ===
Dion moved from Williamsville Athletic Club to ASEC Mimosas in 2019.

=== Jwaneng Galaxy ===
In 2020 he was announced as a signing by Botswana club Jwaneng Galaxy. Jwaneng Galaxy played in African competition, losing to South African side Orlando Pirates, who compared Dion to Thamsanqa Gabuza.

=== Marumo Gallants ===
In 2021, Dion joined South African club Marumo Gallants and was seen as an important player for the Nedbank Cup finalists. In the winter window of 2025, Dion rejoined Marumo Gallants on loan.

=== AmaZulu ===
In December 2022 he reached an agreement to leave Marumo Gallants, promptly signing for AmaZulu. Marumo Gallants manager Dan Malesela called the departure "painful". Notable performances include two goals that secured a victory against Cape Town City in September 2023, as well as a hat-trick in the Carling Knockout Cup in November 2023. A renegotiation of Dion's contract, which was due to expire in the summer of 2024, was discussed.

=== Lamontville Golden Arrows ===
In mid-2025, Junior Dion left AmaZulu to join Lamontville Golden Arrows whom they are rivals from the same city. As of early March 2026, he have now scored 9 goals at Betway Premiership and 1 goal at Nedbank Cup in 20 appearances in all competitions.

== International career ==
Junior Dion was an Ivorian footballer until in late 2025 when he got an offer to represent Chad, he accepted the offer and changed his nationality to represent them at 2026 World Cup qualification.

== Honours ==
Individual

- 2024–25 South African Premiership: Top Scorer
