= Fredrick Asare =

Ghanaian professional footballer

Personal information
- Place of birth: Ghana
- Position: Goalkeeper

Team information
- Current team: Durban City

Senior career*
Years	Team	Apps	(Gls)
–2022	Accra Lions	30	(0)
2022–2025	Asante Kotoko	54	(0)
2025–	Durban City	0	(0)
- * Club domestic league appearances and goals as of 4 January 2026

Fredrick Asare is a Ghanaian professional footballer who plays as a goalkeeper for Durban City in the South African Premier Division. He has previously played for Accra Lions and Asante Kotoko in the Ghana Premier League.

== Club career ==
=== Accra Lions ===
Asare played for Accra Lions in the Ghana Premier League, where his performances attracted attention from larger clubs.

=== Asante Kotoko ===
In 2022, Asante Kotoko signed Asare on a three-year contract. He featured regularly during his first seasons and received the Ghana National Ex-Goalkeepers Union award for Goalkeeper of the Month in December 2022.

During the 2024–25 season, he shared playing time with Mohammed Camara, making 15 league appearances and keeping seven clean sheets. He was part of the Kotoko squad that won the 2025 MTN FA Cup.

=== Durban City ===
Following the expiration of his contract with Kotoko, Asare joined South African side Durban City in July 2025.

== International career ==
Asare has been called up to the Ghana national football team. In 2025, he was named in the Black Stars squad for the Africa Cup of Nations qualifiers, as the only locally based player at the time.
