= Douglas Mapfumo =

Zimbabwean footballer

Personal information
- Full name: Douglas Carl Tinashe Mapfumo
- Date of birth: 1 March 2000 (age 26)
- Place of birth: Harare, Zimbabwe
- Height: 1.88 m (6 ft 2 in)
- Position: Forward

Team information
- Current team: Polokwane City
- Number: 19

Youth career
- CAPS United
- Legends Academy

Senior career*
Years	Team	Apps	(Gls)
2019–2020	Bidvest Wits	0	(0)
2020–2021	Cape Umoya United	21	(2)
2021–2022	Cape Town City	5	(0)
2022	→ Cape Town All Stars (loan)	0	(0)
2022–2023	Black Leopards	9	(1)
2023–	Polokwane City	24	(4)

International career^{‡}
- Zimbabwe U17
- Zimbabwe U20
2024–	Zimbabwe	7	(0)
- * Club domestic league appearances and goals as of 9 February 2025 ‡ National team caps and goals as of 9 February 2025

Douglas Carl Tinashe Mapfumo (born 1 March 2000) is a Zimbabwean football player who plays as a forward for Polokwane City.

Mapfumo was a youth player at CAPS United and spent time at the Legends Academy before he earned a move to South African club Bidvest Wits, following tryouts.

He was picked up by Cape Town City in 2021. The stay was meagre, including a loan spell at Cape Town All Stars without any matches played. He played for Black Leopards in 2022–23 before moving back to the Premier Division with Polokwane City in 2023. In his first season, he helped Polokwane City survive in the Premier Soccer League.

Owing to his "decent" 2023–24 season with Polokwane City, he was called up to Zimbabwe's national team for the first time in 2024. As the national team changed manager to Michael Nees, Mapfumo was briefly omitted from the squad before being called up again.
