= Patrick Maswanganyi =

South African professional footballer

Tito Maswanganyi
Personal information
- Full name: Patrick Maswanganyi
- Date of birth: 4 April 1998 (age 28)
- Place of birth: Tembisa, Gauteng, South Africa
- Height: 1.75 m (5 ft 9 in)
- Position: Midfielder

Youth career
- –: Stars of Africa
- –: Oliveirense
- –: Academica de Coimbra U23

Senior career*
Years	Team	Apps	(Gls)
2022–2023	Supersport United	22	(0)
2023–2026	Orlando Pirates	119	(28)
2026–	Al-Khaldiya SC		

International career^{‡}
–	South Africa U20	3	(0)
2024–	South Africa	4	(2)
- * Club domestic league appearances and goals as of 25 August 2026 ‡ National team caps and goals as of 19 November 2024

Patrick "Tito" Maswanganyi (born 4 April 1998) is a South African professional football player who plays as an attacking midfielder and winger for Bahraini Premier League side Al-Khaldiya SC and the South Africa national team.

== Playing career ==
Maswanganyi spent his early years as a professional footballer in Portugal, where he turned out for U.D. Oliveirense and Académica de Coimbra.

=== SuperSport F.C ===
In 2022, he moved back to South Africa and joined the Betway Premiership side, SuperSport United F.C.

=== Orlando Pirates ===
In 2023, he joined the Soweto club Orlando Pirates and went on to be an integral part in the club winning a number of trophies. Maswanganyi make 119 appearances scoring 28 goals and 21 assist across all competitions. He was voted the South African Premiership players’ player of the season, midfielder of the season, and the Nedbank Cup player of the tournament in 2024. In the following 2024-25 season, despite being watched closely by a number of clubs, Maswanganyi remained in Soweto. With his opponents now familiar with his style of play, it proved to be much harder for him to dominate than in the previous season.

=== Al-Khaldiya ===
In August 2026 he joined Bahraini Premier League side Al-Khaldiya SC.

== International career ==
Maswanganyi received his first senior national team call-up for two International Friendlies against Andorra and Algeria. He made his debut against the former on 21 March 2024, where he played the full 90 minutes in a 1–1 draw. On 15 November 2024, Patrick scored his first goal for South Africa in a 2-0 win over Uganda during the 2025 Africa Cup of Nations qualification.Four days later, Maswanganyi scored his second international goal in a 3-0 win over South Sudan, helping South Africa finish their qualifying group unbeaten.

== Career statistics ==
Club

As of 21 September 2024

Club	Season	League			National Cup		League Cup		Continental		Other		Total	
Club	Season	Division	Apps	Goals	Apps	Goals	Apps	Goals	Apps	Goals	Apps	Goals	Apps	Goals
SuperSport United	2022–23	DStv Premiership	22	0	1	0	0	0	0	0	0	0	23	0
Orlando Pirates	2023–24	DStv Premiership	27	5	5	4	4	0	2	1	4	0	41	10
Orlando Pirates	2024–25	Betway Premiership	14	1	0	0	3	0	8	2	0	0	25	3
Career Total			63	6	6	4	7	0	10	3	4	0	89	13

== Honours ==
Orlando Pirates

- South African Premiership : 2025–26
- Nedbank Cup: 2023–24
- Carling Black Label Cup: 2025–2026
- MTN 8: 2023, 2024, 2025

Individual

- DStv Premiership Players’ Player of the Season: 2024
- DStv Premiership Midfielder of the Season: 2024
- Nedbank Cup Player of the Tournament: 2024
