= Alexandr Sojka =

Czech footballer (born 2003)

Personal information
- Date of birth: 2 April 2003 (age 23)
- Place of birth: Plzeň, Czech Republic
- Height: 1.88 m (6 ft 2 in)
- Position: Midfielder

Team information
- Current team: Viktoria Plzeň
- Number: 12

Youth career
- –2017: Klatovy
- 2017–2021: Viktoria Plzeň

Senior career*
Years	Team	Apps	(Gls)
2021–2025	Viktoria Plzeň	17	(0)
2023–2024	→ Táborsko (loan)	38	(3)
2025–2026	Hradec Králové	18	(1)
2026–	Viktoria Plzeň	15	(2)

International career^{‡}
2019	Czech Republic U16	2	(0)
2024–2025	Czech Republic U21	7	(0)
2026–	Czech Republic	5	(0)
- * Club domestic league appearances and goals as of 26 May 2026 ‡ National team caps and goals as of 25 June 2026

Alexandr Sojka (born 2 April 2003) is a Czech professional footballer who plays as a midfielder for Viktoria Plzeň and the Czech Republic national team. His previous clubs include Hradec Králové, who he played for in 2025, and Táborsko, where he spent a year and a half on loan from 2023 to 2024. He represented the Czech Republic at youth level, playing for his nation at the 2025 UEFA European Under-21 Championship, before making his debut for the senior side in 2026 and being nominated in the squad for the 2026 FIFA World Cup.

== Early life and family ==
Sojka started playing football in Klatovy for SK Klatovy 1898. His older brother, Jindřich Jr., is also a footballer, but never played in a professional league. Their father, Jindřich Sojka Sr., was also a footballer and was the chairman of SK Klatovy from 2002 to 2024, Alexandr's entire childhood.

== Club career ==
Sojka spent the second half of the 2022–23 season on loan at Táborsko in the second-tier Czech National Football League, scoring once for the club in 12 appearances. His loan was extended to include the whole of the following 2023–24 season. Sojka played 17 matches in the Czech First League for Viktoria Plzeň in the 2024–25 season, as well as making nine appearances in the UEFA Europa League. He moved to Hradec Králové on a permanent transfer after the season, with the announcement being made in June 2025. Sojka played for Hradec Králové in the first half of the 2025–26 Czech First League, playing in 18 of the club's 19 matches. He left after Plzeň activated a buy back clause in his contract, joining up with his former team in January 2026.

== International career ==
Having represented the Czech Republic four times at under-21 level, Sojka was one of nine midfielders named in head coach Jan Suchopárek's 24-man squad for the 2025 UEFA European Under-21 Championship in May 2025. He played in the tournament. Sojka received his first call-up for the senior Czech Republic team in May 2026 for a friendly match against Kosovo. He made his debut in the match alongside two other players.

On 31 May 2026, Sojka was selected in the 26-man squad for the 2026 FIFA World Cup.

== Career statistics ==
=== Club ===
As of match played 24 May 2026

Appearances and goals by club, season and competition
Club	Season	League			Cup		Europe		Total	
Club	Season	Division	Apps	Goals	Apps	Goals	Apps	Goals	Apps	Goals
Viktoria Plzeň B	2021–22	Bohemian Football League	18	2	—		—		18	2
Viktoria Plzeň B	2022–23	Bohemian Football League	15	3	—		—		15	3
Viktoria Plzeň B	Total		33	5	—		—		33	5
Táborsko (loan)	2022–23	Czech National Football League	12	1	—		—		12	1
Táborsko (loan)	2023–24	Czech National Football League	26	2	—		—		26	2
Táborsko (loan)	Total		38	3	—		—		38	3
Viktoria Plzeň	2024–25	Czech First League	17	0	3	0	9 (Note: Appearances in UEFA Europa League)	0	29	0
Hradec Králové	2025–26	Czech First League	18	1	2	1	—		20	2
Viktoria Plzeň	2025–26	Czech First League	15	2	1	0	2	0	18	2
Career total			121	11	6	1	11	0	138	12

=== International ===
As of match played 24 June 2026

Appearances and goals by national team and year
National team	Year	Apps	Goals
Czech Republic	2026	5	0
Total		5	0
