= Evidence Makgopa =

South African soccer player (born 2000)

Personal information
- Full name: Sekotori Evidence Makgopa
- Date of birth: 5 June 2000 (age 26)
- Place of birth: GaMampa, South Africa
- Height: 1.88 m (6 ft 2 in)
- Position: Forward

Team information
- Current team: Orlando Pirates
- Number: 17

Youth career
- 2018–2019: Baroka

Senior career*
Years	Team	Apps	(Gls)
2019–2022	Baroka	64	(14)
2022–	Orlando Pirates	54	(13)

International career^{‡}
2021	South Africa Olympic	3	(1)
2021–	South Africa	30	(6)
- * Club domestic league appearances and goals as of 5 January 2026 ‡ National team caps and goals as of 29 June 2026

Sekotori Evidence Makgopa (born 5 June 2000) is a South African professional soccer player who plays as a forward for South African Premiership side Orlando Pirates and the South Africa national team. He represented the South Africa under-23 team at the 2020 Summer Olympics.

== Early life ==
Makgopa was born in GaMampa, in the Capricorn District Municipality of Limpopo. He attended Poo Secondary School.

== Club career ==
Makgopa was scouted by Baroka in 2018, and was promoted to their first team from their development squad in January 2020. He made his debut for the club on 23 February 2020 in a 2–2 Nedbank Cup draw with Hungry Lions; Makgopa scored their second goal as they advanced to the next round of the competition after winning the penalty shoot-out. He made his league debut on 1 March 2020 in a 2–1 defeat to Bloemfontein Celtic, He scored his first league goals for the club the following week as he scored a brace in a 2–0 victory over Black Leopards. He made 11 appearances for Baroka in all competitions during the 2019–20 season, scoring 5 goals.

== International career ==
On 8 June 2021, Makgopa made his debut for South Africa as a substitute against Uganda and scored a brace in a 3–2 win. He represented the South Africa under-23 team at the 2020 Summer Olympics, and scored once in three appearances.

On 1 December 2025, Makgopa was called up to the South Africa squad for the 2025 Africa Cup of Nations.

On 28 May 2026, he was selected by manager Hugo Broos to represent his nation at the 2026 FIFA World Cup.

== Career statistics ==
Scores and results list South Africa's goal tally first, score column indicates score after each Makgopa goal.

List of international goals scored by Evidence Makgopa
No.	Date	Venue	Opponent	Score	Result	Competition
1	10 June 2021	Orlando Stadium, Johannesburg, South Africa	Uganda	1–1	3–2	Friendly
2	10 June 2021	Orlando Stadium, Johannesburg, South Africa	Uganda	3–1	3–2	Friendly
3	9 October 2021	Bahir Dar Stadium, Bahir Dar, Ethiopia	Ethiopia	3–1	3–1	2022 FIFA World Cup qualification
4	30 January 2024	Laurent Pokou Stadium, San-Pédro, Ivory Coast	Morocco	1–0	2–0	2023 Africa Cup of Nations
5	14 October 2025	Mbombela Stadium, Mbombela, South Africa	Rwanda	3–0	3–0	2026 FIFA World Cup qualification
6	4 January 2026	Al Medina Stadium, Rabat, Morocco	Cameroon	1–2	1–2	2025 Africa Cup of Nations

== Honours ==
Orlando Pirates

- South African Premiership: 2025-26
- Nedbank Cup: 2022-23, 2023-24
- MTN 8: 2023-24, 2024-25, 2025-26
- Carling Knockout Cup: 2025–26

South Africa

- Africa Cup of Nations third place: 2023
