= Kayden Francis =

South African soccer player

Personal information
- Full name: Kayden Francis
- Date of birth: 17 February 2003 (age 23)
- Place of birth: Port Elizabeth, South Africa
- Position: Midfielder

Team information
- Current team: Cape Town City
- Number: 24

Youth career
- 2019–2020: Chippa United

Senior career*
Years	Team	Apps	(Gls)
2020–2024	Chippa United	18	(3)
2024–	Cape Town City	3	(0)
- * Club domestic league appearances and goals as of 3 October 2024

Kayden Francis (born 17 February 2003) is a South African professional soccer player who plays as a midfielder for South African Premier Division side Cape Town City. Born in Port Elizabeth, he joined the city's local top-flight side in 2019 where he became the club's youngest-ever player upon making his debut in November the following year.

== Club career ==
=== Chippa United ===
Francis joined Chippa United in 2019 when he signed for the club's development side, who at the time were coached by his uncle and former Ajax Cape Town, Santos and Bay United defender, Duran Francis. He rapidly progressed through the ranks and was promoted to the first team the following year, going on to make his debut as a second-half substitute for Tsietsi Khooa during a 1–1 draw against TTM on 29 November 2020. Upon doing so, at the age of 17 years, nine months and 13 days, he became the youngest-ever player to represent the club in the league.

== Career statistics ==
=== Club ===
As of match played 29 November 2020

Appearances and goals by club, season and competition
Club	Season	League			Cup^{1}		League Cup^{2}		Other^{3}		Total	
Club	Season	Division	Apps	Goals	Apps	Goals	Apps	Goals	Apps	Goals	Apps	Goals
Chippa United	2020–21	PSL	1	0	0	0	–	–	–	–	1	0
Career total			1	0	0	0	0	0	0	0	1	0

^{1} Includes Nedbank Cup matches.
^{2} Includes Telkom Knockout matches.
^{3} Includes MTN 8 matches.
