= Gamphani Lungu =

Zambian footballer (born 1998)

Personal information
- Full name: Gamphani Jones Lungu
- Date of birth: 19 September 1998 (age 28)
- Place of birth: Lusaka, Zambia
- Position: Winger

Team information
- Current team: Orlando Pirates
- Number: 23

Senior career*
Years	Team	Apps	(Gls)
2018	Power Dynamos		
2018–2025	SuperSport United	153	(18)
2025–2026	Siwelele	27	(5)
2026–	Orlando Pirates	4	(2)

International career^{‡}
2018–	Zambia	15	(0)
- * Club domestic league appearances and goals as of 20:37, 1 September 2026 (UTC) ‡ National team caps and goals as of 7 October 2022

Gamphani Jones Lungu (born 19 September 1998) is a Zambian professional footballer who plays as a winger for South African Premiership club Orlando Pirates and the Zambia national football team.

== Career ==
Lungu joined Orlando Pirates from Siwelele in June 2026. He was one of four players being announced as signings of Orlando Pirates, alongside Bohale Ngwato, Mthetheleli Mthiyane, and Sbangani Zulu.

== Style of play ==
Lungu has been described as a versatile player. At Orlando Pirates, he played as a right-back, right winger and striker.
