= Sipho Chaine =

South African soccer player (born 1996)

Personal information
- Full name: Siphon Justin Chaine
- Date of birth: 14 December 1996 (age 29)
- Height: 1.86 m (6 ft 1 in)
- Position: Goalkeeper

Team information
- Current team: Orlando Pirates
- Number: 24

Youth career
- 2013-2016: Bloemfontein Celtic Reserves

Senior career*
Years	Team	Apps	(Gls)
2016–2021	Bloemfontein Celtic	30	(0)
2021–2022	Royal AM	1	(0)
2022	Chippa United	2	(0)
2022–	Orlando Pirates	71	(0)

International career^{‡}
2024–	South Africa	2	(0)
- * Club domestic league appearances and goals as of 3 January 2026 ‡ National team caps and goals as of 10 September 2024

Sipho Justin Chaine (born 14 December 1996) is a South African soccer player who plays as a goalkeeper for Orlando Pirates in the South African Premiership and the South Africa national team.

He was selected as the 2025 and 2026 South African Premiership goalkeeper of the season.

== Club career ==
Chaine played for Bloemfontein Celtic, among others in the Diski Challenge Shield, and was drafted into the senior team. He made his first-tier debut in May 2019 in a 3-1 win against AmaZulu FC, in what would be his only appearance for the season. He would get more minutes in the 2020/2021 season, where he made a total of 15 appearances across all competitions for Bloemfontein Celtic. When Royal AM bought the status of Bloemfontein Celtic, Chaine continued in that team, but barely saw any playing time.

In the summer of 2022, Chaine signed for Chippa United. After only two appearances for Chippa United, Chaine was signed in September 2022, on the last day of the transfer window, by major club Orlando Pirates.

He started as a third choice behind Richard Ofori and Siyabonga Mpontshane, but after the 2022 World Cup break, Chaine was finally able to start his first match for Orlando Pirates. He remained the first choice throughout the season, including the Pirates' victory in the 2022–23 Nedbank Cup. At the same time, some claimed that Chaine kept too few clean sheets.

In the 2023–24 season, Chaine emerged as the first-choice goalkeeper, dislodging Richard Ofori in the process. His heroics in the penalty shootout against Mamelodi Sundowns helped the team win the 2023 MTN 8 in October 2023. At the same time, he was injured in the MTN 8 final, and was kept out of playing until February 2024. Returning from injury, Chaine helped win the 2023–24 Nedbank Cup. At a crucial moment in the cup final, Chaine saved a penalty from Lucas Ribeiro Costa in the early minutes of the game.

In May 2024, a video was released in which Chaine said he would bet on an English soccer match; soccer betting is prohibited for any soccer player. Chaine and Orlando Pirates stated that the video was made in jest.

Chaine was 2024–25 South African Premiership and 2025–26 South African Premiership goalkeeper of the season.

== International career ==
Chaine's stellar performances for Orlando Pirates earned him a call up to the South Africa national team. He made his debut on 10 September 2024 in an Africa Cup of Nations qualifier against South Sudan at the Juba Stadium.

On 1 December 2025, Chaine was called up to the South Africa squad for the 2025 Africa Cup of Nations.

On 28 May 2026, he was selected by manager Hugo Broos to represent his nation at the 2026 FIFA World Cup.

== Honours ==
=== Orlando Pirates ===
- Premiership: 2025–26
- MTN 8: 2022, 2023, 2024, 2025
- Nedbank Cup: 2023, 2024
- Carling Knockout: 2025

Individual

- 2024–25 South African Premiership: Goalkeeper of the Season
- 2025–26 South African Premiership: Goalkeeper of the Season
