= 2024 MTN 8 =

Tournament details
- Date: 3 August 2024 – 5 October 2024
- Teams: 8

Final positions
- Champions: Orlando Pirates
- Runners-up: Stellenbosch

Tournament statistics
- Matches played: 9
- Goals scored: 20 (2.22 per match)
- Top goal scorer(s): Saleng(2 goals); Basadien(2 goals); Mofokeng(2 goals); Mojela(2 goals); Mabasa(2 goals)
- All statistics correct as of 6 October 2024.

The 2024 MTN 8 was the 50th edition of the South African soccer competition featuring the top 8-placed teams at the conclusion of the previous DStv Premiership season, and the 17th under its current sponsored name. The competition started on 3 August 2024.

Prize money was increased to R10 million for the winners of the season.

Orlando Pirates were crowned MTN 8 champions for a third consecutive season and their 13th title overall. Sipho Chaine was later named as the MTN 8 Last Man Standing.

== Teams ==
The following 8 teams are listed according to their final position on the league table in the previous season of the 2023-24 DStv Premiership.

1. Mamelodi Sundowns
2. Orlando Pirates
3. Stellenbosch
4. Sekhukhune United
5. Cape Town City
6. TS Galaxy
7. SuperSport United
8. Polokwane City

== Quarter-finals ==
The quarter-finals were played in the first and second weeks of August.

3 August 2024	Orlando Pirates	3–1 (a.e.t.)	SuperSport United	Soweto
18:00 SAST	Ndah 44'; Saleng 92'; Makgopa 107'	Report	Pule 49'	Stadium: Orlando Stadium

4 August 2024	Stellenbosch	3–1	TS Galaxy	Stellenbosch
15:00 SAST	J Adams 25'; A de Jong 41'; F Basadien 57'	Report	K Sebelebele 18'	Stadium: Danie Craven Stadium

10 August 2024	Sekhukhune United	0–1	Cape Town City	Polokwane
		Report	González 87'	Stadium: Peter Mokaba Stadium

11 August 2024	Mamelodi Sundowns	1–0 (a.e.t.)	Polokwane City	Pretoria
	Matuludi 101'	Report		Stadium: Lucas Moripe Stadium

== Semi-finals ==
1st leg

28 August 2024 1st Leg	Mamelodi Sundowns	0–1	Stellenbosch	Pretoria
		Report	Rayners 62'	Stadium: Lucas Masterpieces Moripe Stadium

28 August 2024 1st Leg	Cape Town City	1–1	Orlando Pirates	Cape Town
	Rhodes 90+'	Report	Mofokeng 14'	Stadium: Cape Town Stadium

2nd leg

31 August 2024 2nd Leg	Orlando Pirates	2–0	Cape Town City	Soweto
	Mabasa 25'; Hotto 42'	Report		Stadium: Orlando Stadium

Orlando Pirates 3–1 won on aggregate

1 September 2024 2nd Leg	Stellenbosch	1–0	Mamelodi Sundowns	Durban
	Mojela 49'	Report		Stadium: Moses Mabhida Stadium

Stellenbosch 2–0 won on aggregate

== Final ==
05 October 2024	Orlando Pirates	3-1	Stellenbosch	Durban
18H00	Saleng 44'; Mabasa 90+2'; Mofokeng 90+5'		Mojela 12'	Stadium: Moses Mabhida Stadium; Referee: Abongile Tom
