= Lehlohonolo Mojela =

South African soccer player (born 1996)

Personal information
- Full name: Lehlohonolo Bradley Mojela
- Date of birth: 18 September 1996 (age 30)
- Place of birth: South Africa
- Position: Forward

Team information
- Current team: Sekhukhune
- Number: 21

Senior career*
Years	Team	Apps	(Gls)
2020–2021	TS Sporting	6	(0)
2021–2022	Platinum City Rovers	27	(2)
2022–2023	Casric Stars	28	(3)
2023–2024	TS Galaxy	27	(4)
2024–2026	Stellenbosch	9	(1)
2026-	Sekhukhune	2	(0)

International career^{‡}
2024–	South Africa	2	(0)
- * Club domestic league appearances and goals as of 14 August 2026 ‡ National team caps and goals as of 4 July 2024

Lehlohonolo Mojela (born 18 September 1996) is a South African soccer player who plays as a forward for Stellenbosch in the Premier Soccer League.

He attended the Shumba Academy. Following the 2022–23 National First Division, Mojela and Casric Stars contested the promotion playoffs, but did not succeed.

While playing for Casric Stars, Mojela was discovered by TS Galaxy, where he was transferred. He thus made his first-tier debut in the 2023-24 South African Premier Division. At TS Galaxy, Mojela helped reach the final of the 2023 Carling Knockout Cup and was described as a "key player".

Soccer Laduma claimed that Kaizer Chiefs were "monitoring" the player. In May 2024, Mojela publicly stated his wish to play for the Mamelodi Sundowns. Stellenbosch also confirmed being interested in the player. He ended up signing for Stellenbosch.

He was also called up for South Africa for the 2024 COSAFA Cup, where he made his international debut against Mozambique.
