= Nkosinathi Sibisi =

South African soccer player (born 1995)

Personal information
- Full name: Nkosinathi Emmanuel Sibisi
- Date of birth: 22 September 1995 (age 31)
- Place of birth: Durban, South Africa
- Height: 1.77 m (5 ft 10 in)
- Position: Defender

Team information
- Current team: Orlando Pirates
- Number: 5

Senior career*
Years	Team	Apps	(Gls)
2015–2022	Lamontville Golden Arrows	99	(3)
2022–	Orlando Pirates	91	(3)

International career^{‡}
2021–	South Africa	21	(0)
- * Club domestic league appearances and goals as of 23 May 2026 ‡ National team caps and goals as of 11 June 2026

Nkosinathi Emmanuel Sibisi (born 22 September 1995), commonly known as Bhodlela, is a South African soccer player who plays as a defender for South African Premier Division side Orlando Pirates, whom he captains, and the South Africa national team.

== Club career ==
In 2022, Sibisi transferred from Lamontville Golden Arrows F.C. to Orlando Pirates F.C..

In July 2025, Sibisi was appointed captain of Orlando Pirates.

== International career ==
He made his debut for South Africa national soccer team on 10 June 2021 in a friendly against Uganda. In 2022, he appeared in three international friendlies. On 10 February 2024, he won a bronze medal at the 2023 Africa Cup of Nations with the South Africa national team.

On 1 December 2025, Sibisi was called up to the South Africa squad for the 2025 Africa Cup of Nations.

He was named to the South Africa squad for the 2026 FIFA World Cup.

== Career statistics ==
=== Club ===
Club	Season	League		
Club	Season	Division	Apps	Goals
Lamontville Golden Arrows F.C.	2018–19	Premiership	28	0
Lamontville Golden Arrows F.C.	2019–20	Premiership	24	0
Lamontville Golden Arrows F.C.	2020–21	Premiership	27	0
Lamontville Golden Arrows F.C.	2021–22	Premiership	20	3
Orlando Pirates F.C.	2022–23	Premiership	27	1
Orlando Pirates F.C.	2023–24	Premiership	16	0
Orlando Pirates F.C.	2024–25	Premiership	25	2
Orlando Pirates F.C.	2025–26	Premiership	23	0
Career total			190	6

=== International ===
As of match played 11 June 2026

Appearances and goals by national team and year
National team	Year	Apps	Goals
South Africa	2021	1	0
South Africa	2022	3	3
South Africa	2023	4	0
South Africa	2024	5	0
South Africa	2025	5	0
South Africa	2026	3	0
Total		21	0

== Honours ==
South Africa

- Africa Cup of Nations third place: 2023
