= Olisa Ndah =

Nigerian professional footballer

Personal information
- Full name: Olisa Harold Ndah
- Date of birth: 21 January 1998 (age 28)
- Place of birth: Asaba, Nigeria
- Height: 6 ft 2 in (1.89 m)
- Position: Centre-back

Team information
- Current team: Stellenbosch
- Number: 99

Senior career*
Years	Team	Apps	(Gls)
2014	Delta Stars		
2015	Sharks		
2015–2016	Sliema Wanderers	0	(0)
2016–2017	Ħamrun Spartans	0	(0)
2017–2018	Sirens	0	(0)
2018–2019	Remo Stars	16	(0)
2019–2021	Akwa United	37	(0)
2021–2026	Orlando Pirates	55	(1)
2026–	Stellenbosch	7	(0)

International career^{‡}
2019	Nigeria U23	3	(0)
2019–	Nigeria	4	(0)
- * Club domestic league appearances and goals as of 17 May 2026 ‡ National team caps and goals as of 23:01, 19 January 2022 (UTC)

Olisa Harold Ndah (born 21 January 1998) is a Nigerian professional footballer who plays as a centre-back for South African Premiership side Stellenbosch and the Nigeria national team.

== Club career ==
Ndah joined Nigeria Premier League side Remo Stars during the 2018–19 season on a two-year contract. On 25 January 2020, Akwa United officially announced the acquisition of Ndah on a two-year deal.

In the 2020–21 season, Ndah won the Nigerian national league title with Akwa United, his first silverware with the club.

On 26 August 2021, it was announced that he had signed with South African Premiership club Orlando Pirates on a permanent deal.

== International ==
Ndah has represented Nigeria U23 at the 2019 Africa U-23 Cup of Nations in Egypt.
