= Relebohile Mofokeng =

South African soccer player (born 2004)

Personal information
- Birth name: Relebohile Ratomo
- Date of birth: 23 October 2004 (age 22)
- Place of birth: Sharpeville, South Africa
- Height: 1.66 m (5 ft 5 in)
- Positions: Attacking midfielder; winger

Team information
- Current team: Union SG
- Number: 38

Youth career
- –: Transnet School of Excellence
- 2021–2023: Orlando Pirates DDC

Senior career*
Years	Team	Apps	(Gls)
2023–2026	Orlando Pirates	81	(19)
2026–	Union SG	10	(6)

International career^{‡}
2022–2023	South Africa U20	5	(2)
2024–	South Africa	21	(6)
- * Club domestic league appearances and goals as of 25 October 2026 ‡ National team caps and goals as of 17 November 2026

Relebohile Mofokeng (né Ratomo; born 23 October 2004) is a South African professional soccer player who plays as an attacking midfielder or winger for Belgian Pro League club Royale Union Saint-Gilloise and the South Africa national team.

Mofokeng began his professional career at Orlando Pirates after progressing through the club's reserve team. In his first full season, he won his first PSL Young Player of the Season award as Pirates secured both the MTN 8 and Nedbank Cup, earning him the first major trophies of his senior career. The following season, he played an integral role in Pirates' run to the CAF Champions League semi-finals for the first time in twelve years and helped the club retain the MTN 8. His performances earned him a second consecutive PSL Young Player of the Season award. During the 2025–26 season, Mofokeng continued to make significant contributions as Pirates completed a domestic treble, winning the league title and two domestic cup competitions. He was subsequently named the 2026 PSL Footballer of the Year and won the PSL Young Player of the Season award for the third consecutive season. His success in South Africa earned him a move to Belgian club Royale Union Saint-Gilloise in July 2026 for a fee of R65.3 million, making him the most expensive domestic player sale in South African football history.

== Club career ==
=== Orlando Pirates ===
Mofokeng progressed through the Transnet School of Excellence, before a transfer arrangement between South African Premier Division sides Mamelodi Sundowns and Orlando Pirates was met, with Mofokeng joining Orlando Pirates and teammate Siyabonga Mabena joining Mamelodi Sundowns. Mofokeng integrated well into the academy of Orlando Pirates, impressing with the reserve team in the DStv Diski Challenge, and being invited to train with the first team.

Having featured on the bench four times, he was given his first start for the club in a DStv Premiership game against Royal AM on 3 May 2023. Following a mistake by Royal AM's Mozambiquan player Domingues, Mofokeng's shot deflected off Domingues into the back of the net. However, the goal was given as an own-goal, as the initial shot was not on target. In only his second game for the club, he notched a goal and an assist in a 4–0 win against AmaZulu. At the 2024 PSL awards he was awarded the Nedbank Cup most promising player of the tournament and the South African Premiership young player of the season.

In the 2025 Carling Knockout Cup, he scored the winning goal in a 1–0 win against Marumo Gallants in extra time to hand the Buccaneers their second trophy of the season. According to Opta Jabu, Mofokeng is the youngest player in PSL history to score in all three domestic cup finals. He won the young player of the season for the second time and the MTN8 last man standing award at the 2025 PSL awards.

Mofokeng was awarded the 2025–26 South African Premiership January/ February player of the month award.On the 22nd of March, he scored his first career hatrick in a 6 - 0 win vs TS Galaxy and was awarded the March player of the month award.

At the 2025–26 South African Premiership awards, Mofokeng became the first Orlando Pirates player since Thembinkosi Lorch in the 2018–19 season to win the PSL footballer of the season award. He was also awarded the premiership players' player of the season and the young player of the season award.

=== Royale Union Saint-Gilloise ===
In 2026, Mofokeng caught some interest from Barcelona and was on their shortlist but on 2 July that year, he signed a four-year contract with Belgian Pro League club Royale Union Saint-Gilloise, for an undisclosed transfer fee, reported to be in the region of R65.3 million (€3.5 million), a South African record sale of a domestric player beating Percy Tau's R50 million transfer in 2018. He scored the winning penalty in a 5-4 win over Club Brugge in the 2026 Belgian Super Cup after the match ended in a 1-all draw.

== International career ==
Mofokeng represented South Africa at the 2022 COSAFA U-20 Cup, scoring twice in five appearances.

He received his first senior national team call-up for the 2026 FIFA World Cup qualifiers to be played in June 2024 against Nigeria and Zimbabwe. Mofokeng made his debut against the latter on 11 June 2024 at the Free State Stadium. He substituted Oswin Appollis in added time, as South Africa won 3–1. Mofokeng scored his first goal for South Africa against Lesotho in the 2026 FIFA World Cup qualifiers.However, the result was later overturned after South Africa fielded an ineligible player who was serving a suspension.

On 1 December 2025, Mofokeng was called up to the South Africa squad for the 2025 Africa Cup of Nations.

On 28 May 2026, he was selected by manager Hugo Broos to represent his nation at the 2026 FIFA World Cup, where he went onto make 3 appearances in the World Cup finals.

== Personal life ==
At the time of his move to the Orlando Pirates, he was using his mother's last name, Ratomo, as his parents were not yet married. Three weeks after his registration with the club, he changed his last name legally to Mofokeng - the last name of his father, and former footballer, Sechaba Mofokeng - and this would be his official name ahead of the 2023–24 season. This name change was confirmed by the Orlando Pirates on 4 August 2023.

== Career statistics ==
=== Club ===
As of match played 25 October 2026

Appearances and goals by club, season and competition
Club	Season	League			National cup (Note: Includes Nedbank Cup)		League cup (Note: Includes Carling Knockout Cup)		Continental		Other		Total	
Club	Season	Division	Apps	Goals	Apps	Goals	Apps	Goals	Apps	Goals	Apps	Goals	Apps	Goals
Orlando Pirates	2022–23	South African Premiership	2	1	0	0	0	0	0	0	0	0	2	1
Orlando Pirates	2023–24	South African Premiership	26	3	5	2	1	0	3 (Note: Appearances in CAF Champions League)	0	3 (Note: Appearances in MTN 8)	0	38	5
Orlando Pirates	2024–25	South African Premiership	26	5	5	0	1	0	13	5	4	2	49	12
Orlando Pirates	2025–26	South African Premiership	27	10	1	0	3	1	1	0	4	0	36	11
Orlando Pirates	Total		81	19	11	2	5	1	17	5	11	2	125	29
Union SG	2026–27	Belgian Pro League	6	3	1	0	—		4 (Note: One appearance in UEFA Champions League, three appearances and one goal in UEFA Europa League)	1	1 (Note: Appearance in Belgian Super Cup)	0	12	4
Career total			87	22	12	2	5	1	21	6	12	2	137	33

=== International ===
As of 17 November 2026

Appearances and goals by national team and year
National team	Year	Apps	Goals
South Africa	2024	5	0
South Africa	2025	5	1
South Africa	2026	11	5
Total		21	6

Scores and results list South Africa's goal tally first.

List of international goals scored by Mofokeng
No.	Date	Venue	Opponent	Score	Result	Competition
1	21 March 2025	Peter Mokaba Stadium, Polokwane, South Africa	Lesotho	1–0	2–0	2026 FIFA World Cup qualification
2	30 September 2026	Al Salam Stadium, Cairo, Egypt	Eritrea	1–0	5–0	2027 Africa Cup of Nations qualification
3	30 September 2026	Al Salam Stadium, Cairo, Egypt	Eritrea	2–0	5–0	2027 Africa Cup of Nations qualification
4	13 November 2026	Orlando Stadium, Johannesburg, South Africa	Kenya	2–1	2–2	2027 Africa Cup of Nations qualification
5	17 November 2026	Nyayo National Stadium, Nairobi, Kenya	Kenya	1–0	2–1	2027 Africa Cup of Nations qualification
6	17 November 2026	Nyayo National Stadium, Nairobi, Kenya	Kenya	2–0	2–1	2027 Africa Cup of Nations qualification

== Honours ==
Orlando Pirates

- South African Premiership: 2025–26
- Nedbank Cup: 2022–23, 2023–24
- Carling Knockout Cup: 2025
- MTN 8: 2023, 2024, 2025

Royale Union Saint-Gilloise

- Belgian Super Cup: 2026

Individual

- South African Premiership Young Player of the Season: 2024, 2025, 2026
- Nedbank Cup Most Promising Player: 2023–24
- MTN8 Last Man Standing: 2024
- South African Premiership Player of the Month: January 2026, February 2026, March 2026
- South African Premiership Footballer of the Season: 2025–26
- South African Premiership Players' Player of the Season: 2025–26
