= 2022–23 Mamelodi Sundowns F.C. season =

Mamelodi Sundowns 2022–23 football season

Mamelodi Sundowns
2022–2023 season
- Owner: Patrice Motsepe
- Chairman: Tlhopie Motsepe
- Head coach: Rhulani Mokoena
- Stadium: Lucas Masterpieces Moripe Stadium; Loftus Versfeld Stadium
- DStv Premiership: 1st
- 2022 MTN 8: Semi-finals
- Champions League: (group stage)
- Top goalscorer: League: Peter Shalulile (9 goals); Overall: Cassius Mailula (16 goals)
- Highest home attendance: 37 500; 0–0 v Orlando Pirates; MTN 8 (1 October 2022)
- Biggest win: 7–0 v La Passe FC; Champions League (9 October 2022) 8–1 v La Passe FC; Champions League (14 October 2022)
- Biggest defeat: 0–3 v Orlando Pirates; MTN 8 (22 October 2022)
Home colours	Away colours

This 2022–23 campaign of the South African Premier Division is Mamelodi Sundowns' 27th consecutive season in the PSL League.

== First Team Squad ==
As of 13 November 2022

Squad No.	Player	Nationality	Date of birth	Signed From	Apps	Goals	Assists
Goalkeepers
1	Kennedy Mweene	Zambia	11 December 1984 (Aged 37)	(South Africa) Free State Stars			7
14	Denis Onyango	Uganda	15 May 1985 (Aged 38)	(South Africa) Bidvest Wits (on loan)			
30	Reyaad Pieterse	South Africa	17 February 1992 (Aged 30)	(South Africa) SuperSport United			
32	Ronwen Williams	South Africa	21 January 1992 (Aged 30)	(South Africa) SuperSport United	4	0	0
39	Jody February	South Africa	12 May 1996 (Aged 26)	(South Africa) Ajax Cape Town			
Defenders
3	Rushine De Reuck	South Africa	1 January 1996 (Aged 26)	(South Africa) Maritzburg United	26	0	
5	Mosa Lebusa	South Africa	10 October 1992 (Aged 30)	(South Africa) Ajax Cape Town			
6	Brian Onyango	Kenya	24 July 1994 (Aged 28)	(South Africa) Maritzburg United			
20	Grant Kekana	South Africa	31 October 1992 (Aged 30)	(South Africa) SuperSport United			
25	Khuliso Mudau	South Africa	26 April 1995 (Aged 27)	(South Africa) Black Leopards			
27	Thapelo Morena	South Africa	6 August 1993 (Aged 29)	(South Africa) Bloemfontein Celtic			
37	Sifiso Ngobeni	South Africa	8 February 1997 (Aged 27)	(South Africa) Bloemfontein Celtic	2	0	0
41	Terrence Mashego	South Africa	23 June 1998 (Aged 24)	(South Africa) Cape Town City	1	0	0
42	Rivaldo Coetzee	South Africa	16 October 1996 (Aged 26)	(South Africa) Ajax Cape Town			
Midfielders
4	Teboho Mokoena	South Africa	24 January 1997 (Aged 25)	(South Africa) SuperSport United			
8	Bongani Zungu	South Africa	9 October 1992 (Aged 30)	(France) Amiens SC			
15	Andile Jali	South Africa	10 April 1990 (Aged 32)	(Belgium) K.V. Oostende			
17	Aubrey Modiba	South Africa	22 June 1995 (Aged 27)	(South Africa) SuperSport United			
18	Themba Zwane	South Africa	3 August 1989 (Aged 33)	(South Africa) Mpumalanga Black Aces (On loan)	319	70	38
19	Gift Motupa	South Africa	23 September 1994 (Aged 28)	(South Africa) Bidvest Wits			
21	Sphelele Mkhulise	South Africa	19 February 1996 (Aged 26)	(South Africa) Richards Bay (On loan)			
23	Haashim Domingo	South Africa	13 August 1995 (Aged 27)	(South Africa) Bidvest Wits			
23	Sipho Mbule	South Africa	22 March 1998 (Aged 24)	(South Africa) SuperSport United			
26	Erwin Saavedra	Bolivia	26 February 1996 (Aged 26)	(Bolivia) Club Bolívar			
29	Bradley Ralani	South Africa	4 October 1987 (Aged 35)	(South Africa) Cape Town City			
33	Cassius Mailula	South Africa	12 June 2001 (Aged 21)	Rerseves			
35	Neo Maema	South Africa	1 December 1995 (Aged 26)	(South Africa) Bloemfontein Celtic			
41	Mothobi Mvala	South Africa	14 June 1994 (Aged 28)	(South Africa) Highlands Park			
Forwards
10	Gastón Sirino	Uruguay	22 February 1991 (Aged 31)	(Bolivia) Club Bolívar			
11	Marcelo Allende	Chile	7 April 1999 (Aged 23)	(Uruguay) Montevideo City Torque			
12	Thabiso Kutumela	South Africa	2 July 1993 (Aged 29)	(South Africa) Maritzburg United			
22	Lesedi Kapinga	South Africa	25 May 1995 (Aged 27)	(South Africa) Black Leopards			
28	Abubeker Nassir	Ethiopia	23 February 2000 (Aged 22)	(Ethiopia) Ethiopian Coffee			
31	Pule Maraisane	South Africa	3 January 1995 (Aged 27)	(Turkey) 1911 Çerkezköyspor Kulübü			
33	Lebohang Maboe	South Africa	17 September 1994 (Aged 28)	(South Africa) Maritzburg United			
36	Promise Mkhuma	South Africa	24 May 2000 (Aged 22)	(South Africa) Moroka Swallows (On loan)			
38	Peter Shalulile	Namibia	23 October 1993 (Aged 29)	(South Africa) Highlands Park			

== Transfers ==
=== In ===
Date	Position	Nat	Name	From	Fee	Ref.
03/06/22	CM	(South Africa)	Sipho Mbule (age 24)	(South Africa) SuperSport United	Undesclosed	
13/08/22	MF	(South Africa)	Bongani Zungu (Age 30)	(France) Amiens SC	Free	
22/09/22	CB	(Morocco)	Abdelmounaim Boutouil (Age 24)	(Belgium) Union SG	ZAR6'800'000 (€426'000)	
12/09/22	DF	(South Africa)	Terrence Mashego (Age 24)	(South Africa) Cape Town City	ZAR10'000'000	
24/08/22	AM	(Chile)	Marcelo Allende (Age 22)	(Uruguay) Montevideo City Torque	ZAR51'000'000	

=== Out ===
Date	Position	Nat	Name	To	Fee	Ref
22 September 2022	DF	(South Africa)	Lyle Lakay	(South Africa) Cape Town City	Undesclosed	
3 August 2022	MD	(Zimbabwe)	Divine Lunga	(South Africa) Lamontville Golden Arrows	On Loan	
14 July 2022	FW	(South Africa)	Sibusiso Vilakazi	(South Africa) TS Galaxy	Undesclosed	
June 2022	MD	(South Africa)	George Maluleka	(South Africa) AmaZulu	Undesclosed	
26 August 2022	FW	(Slovakia)	Pavol Safranko	(Romania) Sepsi OSK	ZAR13'000'000 €700'000	

=== Transfer summary ===
Spending

Winter: ▼ZAR 67' 800' 000

Summer:

Total: ▼ZAR 67' 800' 000

Income

Winter: ▲ZAR 13' 000' 000

Summer:

Total: ▲

Net expenditure

Winter: ▼ZAR 54' 800' 000

Summer:

Total: ▼ZAR 54' 800' 0000

== Competitions ==
Competition	First match	Last match	Starting round	Final position	Record							
Competition	First match	Last match	Starting round	Final position	Pld	W	D	L	GF	GA	GD	Win %
2022–23 PSL	5 August 2022	20 May 2023	Matchday 1	Winner	30	21	7	2	52	13	+39	70.00
2022 MTN 8	28 August 2022	22 October 2022	First Round	Semi-Final	3	1	1	1	2	3	−1	33.33
2022-23 CAF Champions League	9 October 2022		Second round	Semi-Final	12	8	4	0	37	12	+25	66.67
2022-23 Nedbank Cup	7 February 2023	15 April 2023	Third round	Quarter-Final	3	2	0	1	7	5	+2	66.67
Total					48	32	12	4	98	33	+65	66.67

Source: Competitions

=== Premier Soccer League ===
==== Results summary ====
Overall								Home						Away					
Pld	W	D	L	GF	GA	GD	Pts	W	D	L	GF	GA	GD	W	D	L	GF	GA	GD
22	18	2	2	40	8	+32	56	9	0	1	18	2	+16	9	2	1	22	6	+16

==== Results by matchday ====
matchday	1	2	3	4	5	6	7	8	9	10	11	12	13	14	15	16	17	18	19	20	21	22	23	24	25	26	27	28	29	30
ground	A (Note: GW1)	H	H	A	H	A	A	H	H	H	A	A	H	H	A	H	A	H	A	H	A	A	H	H	A	A	H	A	A	H
Results	W	L	W	D	W	L	W	W	W	W	W	W	W	W	W	W	W	W	W	W	W	D								
Position	4	8	6	4	2	3	2	1	1	1	1	1	1	1	1	1	1	1	1	1	1	1	1	1	1	1				
Points	3	3	6	7	10	10	13	16	19	22	25	28	31	34	37	40	43	46	49	52	55	56								

Updated to match(es) played on 8 November 2022. Source: psl
A = Away; H = Home; W = Win; D = Draw; L = Loss

==== Matches ====
5 August 2022 Day 1	Cape Town City	0–2	Mamelodi Sundowns	Cape Town, WC
19:30SAST	Martin (yellow card) 6'; Ambina (yellow card) 22'; Cupido (yellow card) 44'; Fielies (yellow card) 81'	Report	Mudau (yellow card) 40'; Modiba (yellow card) 49' (goal) 61'; Zwane 63'	Stadium: Cape Town Stadium; Referee: Thando Ndzandzeka

10 August 2022 Day 2	Mamelodi Sundowns	0–1	TS Galaxy	Pretoria, GP
19:30 SAST	B.Onyango (yellow card) 47'; Modiba (yellow card) 88'	Report	Hlongwane 34'; Aubaas (yellow card) 81'	Stadium: Loftus Versfeld; Attendance: 5'000; Referee: Abraham Mashala

13 August 2022 Day 3	Mamelodi Sundowns	4–0	Kaizer Chiefs	Pretoria, GP
15:00	Sirino 6' (yellow card) 13'; Shalulile 17' (pen.), 53'; Williams (yellow card) 38'; De Reuck (yellow card) 45'; Nasir 76'	Report	Kwinika (yellow card) 16'	Stadium: Loftus Versfeld Stadium; Attendance: 40'000; Referee: Victor Gomes

20 August 2022 Day 4	Sekhukhune United	1–1	Mamelodi Sundowns	Polokwane, LP
15:00 SAST	Letsoalo (yellow card) 32'; Mobbie (yellow card) 40'; Mntambo 46'; Mahlangu (yellow card) 59'; Mosiatlhage (yellow card) 75'; Motsepe (yellow card) 82'	Report	Shalulile 45'; Maema (yellow card) 49'; Mkhulise (yellow card) 79'	Stadium: Peter Mokaba; Referee: Masixole Bambiso

24 August 2022 Day 5	Mamelodi Sundowns	3–0	Stellenbosch	Pretoria, GP
17:00 SAST	Maema 2'; Shalulile 41'; Allende 76'	Report		Stadium: Loftus Versfeld; Referee: Jelly Chavani

2 September 2022 Day 6	SuperSport United	2–1	Mamelodi Sundowns	Pretoria, GP
19:30 SAST	Maseko 9'; Grobler 45+1'; Maziko (yellow card) 90+1'	Report	B.Onyango (yellow card) 56'; Nasir 90+3'	Stadium: Lucas Masterpieces Moripe; Referee: Thando Ndzandzeka

7 Sep 2022 Day 7	Chippa United	0–1	Mamelodi Sundowns	Gqeberha, EC
19:30 SAST	Poggenpoel (yellow card) 4'; Mqokozo (yellow card) 48'; Banda (yellow card) 88'	Report	Modiba (yellow card) 79' (yellow-red card) 90+4'; Jali 84'; Shalulile 90+1'	Stadium: Nelson Mandela Bay; Referee: Thabo Khabela

10 Sep 2022 Day 8	Mamelodi Sundowns	2–1	Lamontville Golden Arrows	Pretoria, GP
20:00 SAST	Shalulile 44' (pen.); Ndlovu 59' (o.g.); Mvala (yellow card) 71'	Report	N.Dlamini (yellow card) 31'; Dube (yellow card) 47'; Mmodi 49'; Nxadi (yellow card) 84'	Stadium: ABSA Tuks; Referee: Masixole Bambiso

18 Sep 2022 Day 9	Mamelodi Sundowns	1–0	AmaZulu	Pretoria, GP
15:00 SAST	Kekana (yellow card) 52'; De Reuck (yellow card) 71'; Mudau (yellow card) 74'; Allende 90+1'	Report	V.Zulu (yellow card) 43'; Hanamub (yellow card) 74'; Makhaula (yellow card) 90+2'	Stadium: Loftus Versfeld; Referee: Xola Sitela

19 October 2022 Day 10	Mamelodi Sundowns	1–0	Marumo Gallants	Pretoria, GP
19:00 South African Standard Time	Mkhulise 28'; Mvala; (yellow card) 59'; Zwane; (yellow card) 79'; Mokoena; (yellow card) 89'	Report	Otladisa; (yellow card) 67'	Stadium: Loftus Versfeld Stadium; Referee: Michael Mosemeng

25 October 2022 Day 11	Maritzburg United	0–5	Mamelodi Sundowns	P'Maritzburg, KZN
19:30 SAST	Ritchie (yellow card) 10'; Mashikinya (yellow card) 63'; Ndengane (yellow card) 90+1'	Report	Domingo 26', 67'; (yellow card) 90+2'; Morena 29'; Maema (yellow card) 36'; Mailula 45', 76'	Stadium: Harry Gwala; Referee: Cedric Muvhali

29 October 2022 Day 12	Royal AM	0–3	Mamelodi Sundowns	Durban, KZN
18:00 SAST	Phalane (yellow card) 34'	Report	Lebusa (yellow card) 4'; Maema 45'; Allende (yellow card) 64'; Mailula 85'; Ralani 89'	Stadium: Chatsworth Stadium; Referee: Thabo Khabela

30 Dec 2022 Day 13	Mamelodi Sundowns	2–0	Orlando Pirates	Pretoria, GP
15:30 SAST	Kekana (yellow card) 32'; Mvala 42'; Mailula 63'		Xoki (yellow card) 6'; Monyane (yellow card) 26'; Shandu (yellow card) 90+1'	Stadium: Loftus Versfeld Stadium

3 Jan 2023 Day 14	Mamelodi Sundowns	2–0	Swallows FC	Pretoria, GP
19:30 SAST	Maema 63'; Zwane 67'	Report		Stadium: Loftus Versfeld Stadium

6 Jan 2023 Day 15	Richards Bay	0–2	Mamelodi Sundowns	Durban, KZN
19:30	Salim (yellow card) 69'; Barns (yellow card) 71'	Report	Mailula 39'; Domingo 66'	Stadium: King Goodwill Zwelithini Stadium; Referee: Thando Ndzandzeka

10 Jan 2022 Day 16	Mamelodi Sundowns	2–1	Chippa United	Pretoria, GP
19:30	Mokoena 14'; Shalulile 67'; Mbule (yellow card) 86'; Mokoena (yellow card) 90+4'	Report	Mkhize (yellow card) 82'; Lebitso 90+2'	Stadium: Loftus Versfeld Stadium; Man of the Match: Teboho Mokoena

16 Jan 2022 Day 17	Mamelodi Sundowns	1–0	SuperSport United	Pretoria, GP
18:00 SAST	Maema 43'; Zwane (yellow card) 48'; (yellow card) 77'	Report		Stadium: Loftus Versfeld

20 Jan 2023 Day 18	Kaizer Chiefs	0–1	Mamelodi Sundowns	Jo'burg, GP
20:00 SAST	Maart (yellow card) 60'; Sithebe (yellow card) 87'	Report	Maema 20'; Shalulile (yellow card) 57'; Mudau (yellow card) 73'; Williams (yellow card) 80'; Saavedra (yellow card) 90+1'	Stadium: FNB; Attendance: 32'700; Man of the Match: Khuliso Mudau

24 Jan 2023 Day 19	TS Galaxy	1–2	Mamelodi Sundowns	Mbombela, MP
19:30 SAST	Radebe (yellow card) 66'; Traoré 90+5' (pen.)	Report	De Reuck 11'; Kekana (yellow card) 22'; Zwane (yellow card) 45'; Shalulile 64'	Stadium: Mbombela

28 Jan 2023 Day 20	Mamelodi Sundowns	2–0	Sekhukhune United	Pretoria, GP
15:30 SAST	Mkhulise (yellow card) 55'; Shalulile 50'; Allende (red card) 76'; Mailula 82'	Report	Letsoalo (yellow card) 12'; Leepile (yellow card) 21'; Mobbie (yellow card) 28'	Stadium: Loftus Versfeld; Attendance: 20'000; Man of the Match: Sphelele Mkhulise

4 Feb 2023 Day 21	Orlando Pirates	0–1	Mamelodi Sundowns	Jo'burg, GP
15:30 SAST	Monare (yellow card) 23'; Maela (yellow card) 90+3'	Report	Mailula 6'; Zwane (yellow card) 20'; Mudau (yellow card) 75'; Mbule (yellow card) 90+3'	Stadium: Orlando; Attendance: 38'000; Referee: Bambiso

5 Mar 2023 Day 22	Stellenbosch	1–1	Mamelodi Sundowns	Cape Town, WC
15:30 SAST	Rayners 87' (pen.)	Report	Mailula 77'	Stadium: Danie Craven Stadium; Referee: Jelly Chavani

==== Nedbank Cup ====
7 Feb 2023 Round of 32	Mamelodi Sundowns	3–2	Richards Bay	Pretoria, GP
19:30 SAST	Shalulile 11', 55'; Mbule (yellow card) 34'; Lebusa 46'; Zungu (yellow card) 78'	Report	N.Zungu 30' (pen.); Ntsudwana (yellow card) 73'; Makateng 90'	Stadium: Loftus Versfeld; Referee: Jelly Chavani; Man of the Match: Peter Shalulile

7 Feb 2023 Round of 32	Marumo Gallants	1–3	Mamelodi Sundowns	Bloemfontein, FS
19:30 SAST	Pheko (yellow card) 14' (goal) 33'	Report	Shalulile 8', 26', 74'; Lebusa (yellow card) 48'; D.Onyango (yellow card) 90+1'	Stadium: Free State Toyota

=== MTN 8 ===
==== Quarter final ====
28 August 2022 First Round	Mamelodi Sundowns	2–0	SuperSport United	Pretoria, GP
18:00	Allende 79'; Nassir 90+1'			Stadium: Loftus Versfeld Stadium

==== Semi-finals ====
1 Oct 2022 First leg	Orlando Pirates	0–0 (0–0 agg.)	Mamelodi Sundowns	Soweto, GP
15:30 SAST				Stadium: Orlando Stadium; Attendance: 37'000

22 Oct 2022 2nd Leg	Mamelodi Sundowns	0–3 (0–3 agg.)	Orlando Pirates	Polokwane, LP
15:30			Erasmus 8'; Saleng 83', 90+2'	Stadium: Peter Mokaba Stadium; Attendance: 45'000; Referee: Thando Nzanzeka

=== Champions League ===
==== Second round ====
9 Oct 2022 Second round	(Seychelles) La Passe FC	0–7	Mamelodi Sundowns	Pretoria, GP
18:00 SAST			Kekana 1'; Sirino; 13', 44'; Jupitor 20' (o.g.); Modiba 40'; Mbule 59'; Mkhulise 87'	Stadium: Loftus Versfeld Stadium; Referee: (Angola) Hélder Martins

14 Oct 2022 2nd Leg	Mamelodi Sundowns	8–1	(Seychelles) La Passe	Pretoria, GP
18:00 SAST	Morena 8'; Mailula 38', 45', 86'; Motupa 70', 90+2'; Domingo 76'; Maema 78'		Rajaonaisy 37'	Stadium: Loftus Versfeld Stadium; Referee: (Egypt) Mahmoud el Banna
Note: Mamelodi Sundowns 15–1 on aggregate

==== Group stage ====
11 Feb 2023 Day 1	Mamelodi Sundowns	1–0	(Sudan) Al Hilal	Pretoria, GP
15:30 SAST	Mailula 25'	Report	A.Abaker (yellow card) 59' (yellow-red card) 86' A.Saddig (yellow card) 90+3'	Stadium: Loftus Versfeld; Referee: Jean Jacques Ndala Ngambo

17 February 2023 Day 2	Coton Sport (Cameroon)	1–3	Mamelodi Sundowns	Roumdé Adjia Stadium, Garoua
17:00 UTC+1	Wassou 30'; Malone (yellow card) 54'; Kaïba (yellow card) 90+2'	Report	Mailula 10', 43'; Morena 11'; Mvala (yellow card) 82'	Referee: Samuel Uwikunda (Rwanda)

25 February 2023 Day 3	Al Ahly (Egypt)	2–2	(South Africa) Mamelodi Sundowns	Al Ahly WE Al Salam Stadium, Cairo
21:00 UTC+2	Abdelmonem 59'; El Shahat 74'	Report	Shalulile 34'; Morena 80'	Referee: Bamlak Tessema Weyesa (Ethiopia)

7 March 2023	Mamelodi Sundowns (South Africa)	5–2	(Egypt) Al Ahly	Loftus Versfeld Stadium, Pretoria
--:-- UTC+2		Report

== Carling Black Label Cup ==
=== Semi-final ===
12 Nov 2022 Semi-final	Mamelodi Sundowns	3–0	AmaZulu	Jo'burg, GP
9:30 SAST	Mailula 5'; Zungu (yellow card) 40'; Domingo 69'; Ralani 73'		Makhaula (yellow card) 81'	Stadium: FNB Stadium; Attendance: 90'000; Man of the Match: Mailula

==== Final ====
12 Nov 2022 Final	Mamelodi Sundowns	4–0	Orlando Pirates	Jo'Burg, GP
17:30 SAST	Mkhulise 23'; Maboe (yellow card) 28'; Kekana 33'; Mailula 35', 66'		Xoki (red card) 20'; Motshwari (yellow card) 54'	Stadium: FNB Stadium; Attendance: 70'000; Man of the Match: Mkhulise

== Squad statistics ==
=== Appearances ===
Players with no appearances are not included on list.

As of 29 October 2022

No.	Pos.	Nat.	Player	PSL		Nedbank Cup		MTN 8		Champions League		Other		Total	
No.	Pos.	Nat.	Player	Apps	Starts	Apps	Starts	Apps	Starts	Apps	Starts	Apps	Starts	Apps	Starts
3	DF	(South Africa)	Rushine De Reuck	14	13	1	0	3	3	1	1	1	1	20	18
4	DF	(South Africa)	Teboho Mokoena	20	18	–	–	3	3	4	4	1	1	28	26
5	DF	(South Africa)	Mosa Lebusa	7	6	2	2	0	0	3	1	0	0	12	9
6	DF	(Kenya)	Brian Onyango	8	7	–	–	1	1	2	0	0	0	11	8
7	DF	(South Africa)	Lyle Lakay	6	1	–		1	1	–				7	2
8	MD	(South Africa)	Bongani Zungu	4	0	2	2	1	0	5	1	1	1	12	4
10	MF	(Uruguay)	Gastón Sirino	14	9	–	–	2	1	2	2	2	1	20	13
11	MD	(Chile)	Marcelo Allende	15	12	1	1	3	1	5	5	0	0	24	19
12	FW	(South Africa)	Thabiso Kutumela	4	2	2	0	1	1	1	0	0	0	8	3
13	DF	(Morocco)	Abdelmounaim Boutouil	–						1	0	–		1	0
14	GK	(Uganda)	Denis Onyango	2	2	2	2	–		1	1	1	1	6	6
15	MD	(South Africa)	Andile Jali	12	8	1	0	2	2	0	0	2	1	17	11
17	MD	(South Africa)	Aubrey Modiba	14	10	1	0	2	2	5	5	2	2	24	19
18	MD	(South Africa)	Themba Zwane	19	17	1	1	3	3	2	2	2	1	28	24
19	FW	(South Africa)	Gift Motupa	2	0	–	–	1	0	4	0	1	1	8	1
20	DF	(South Africa)	Grant Kekana	13	11	–	–	2	2	4	4	2	2	21	19
21	MD	(South Africa)	Sphelele Mkhulise	13	9	1	1	1	1	5	5	1	0	21	16
22	MD	(South Africa)	Lesedi Kapinga	5	0	1	1	0	0	0	0	2	0	8	1
23	FW	(South Africa)	Haashim Domingo	9	7	1	0	1	0	1	0	2	1	14	9
24	DF	(South Africa)	Sipho Mbule	16	4	1	1	1	0	1	0	1	1	20	6
25	DF	(South Africa)	Khuliso Mudau	19	17	–	–	3	3	4	4	0	0	26	22
26	FW	(Bolivia)	Erwin Saavedra	5	1	–	–	–						5	1
27	Df	(South Africa)	Thapelo Morena	16	8	2	2	3	1	5	2	2	2	28	23
28	FW	(Ethiopia)	Abubeker Nassir	4	2	–	–	1	0	0	0	0	0	5	2
29	DF	(South Africa)	Bradley Ralani	8	0	1	1	0	0	1	0	2	1	13	2
30	GK	(South Africa)	Reyaad Pieterse	1	1	–		0	0	1	1	–		2	2
31	MD	(South Africa)	Ntandoyenkosi Nkosi	1	1	–		0	0	0	0	1	0	2	1
32	GK	(South Africa)	Ronwen Williams	19	19	–		3	3	3	3	1	1	26	26
33	FW	(South Africa)	Cassius Mailula	13	8	1	1	2	0	5	4	2	1	23	14
34	MD	(South Africa)	Mothobi Mvala	15	11	2	2	2	1	5	5	1	1	25	20'
35	FW	(South Africa)	Neo Maema	19	17	1	1	3	3	4	1	0	0	27	22
36	MD	(South Africa)	Katlego Mohamme	–				0	0	0	0	1	0	1	0
37	DF	(South Africa)	Sifiso Ngobeni	9	5	2	2	0	0	0	0	0	0	11	7
38	FW	(Namibia)	Peter Shalulile	16	14	2	2	2	2	2	2	0	0	22	20
39	FW	(South Africa)	Lebohang Maboe	3	0	–	–	–	–	0	0	2	2	5	2
40	DF	(South Africa)	Rivaldo Coetzee	1	1	2	0	0	0	0	0	1	0	4	1
41	LB	(South Africa)	Terrence Mashego	2	1	1	0	-						3	1
43	MD	(South Africa)	Thando Buthelezi	–		1	0	–						1	0
44	DF	(South Africa)	Bongolwethu Siyasi	–				0	0	0	0	1	0	1	0
45	MD	(South Africa)	Jerome Karlese	1	0	–								1	0
46	MD	(South Africa)	Siyanda Nyanga	1	0	–								1	0

=== Goals ===
Rank	Pos.	No.	Player	PSL	Nedbank Cup	8 Cup	Champions League	Other	Total	
1	MD	33	(South Africa) Cassius Mailula	8	0	0	6	3	17	
2	FW	38	(Namibia) Peter Shalulile	9	5	0	1	0	15	
3	MD	5	(South Africa) Neo Maema	5	–	0	1	0	6	
4	FW	23	(South Africa) Haashim Domingo	3	–	0	1	1	5	
5	MD	11	(Chile) Marcelo Allende	2	–	1	0	0	3	
5	DF	27	(South Africa) Thapelo Morena	1	–	0	2	0	3	
5	FW	28	(Ethiopia) Abubeker Nassir	2	–	1	0		3	
5	21	MD	(South Africa) Sphelele Mkhulise	1	–	0	1	1	3	
5	MD	10	(Uruguay) Gastón Sirino	1	–	0	2	0	3	
9	MD	18	(South Africa) Themba Zwane	2	–	0	0	0	2	
9	FW	19	(South Africa) Gift Motupa			0	2		2	
9	DF	20	(South Africa) Grant Kekana	–			1	1	2	
9	MF	33	(South Africa) Aubrey Modiba	1	–	0	1	0	2	
9	DF	29	(South Africa) Bradley Ralani	1	–	0	0	1	2	
15	DF	24	(South Africa) Sipho Mbule	1	–			1	–	1
15	MD	34	(South Africa) Mothobi Mvala	1	–				–	1
15	MD	4	(South Africa) Teboho Mokoena	1	–					1
15	DF	3	(South Africa) Rushine De Reuck	1	–					1
15	DF		(South Africa) Mosa Lebusa	–	1	–				1
15	DF		(South Africa) Khuliso Mudau	–			1	0		1

=== Assists ===
Rank	Pos.	No.	Player	PSL	Nedbank Cup	8 Cup	Champions League	Other	Total
1	MD	10	(Uruguay) Gastón Sirino	4	0	0	0	3	7
2	DF	27	(South Africa) Thapelo Morena	5	–				5
3	MD	18	(South Africa) Themba Zwane	3	–			1	4
3	MD	17	(South Africa) Aubrey Modiba	2	–			1	4
3	FW	33	(South Africa) Cassius Mailula	3	0	0	1	0	4
5	MD		(South Africa) Lesedi Kapinga	0	2	0	0	1	3
5	FW	38	(Namibia) Peter Shalulile	2	0	1	0	0	3
8	MD		(South Africa) Neo Maema	1	1	0	0	0	2
8	DF	4	(South Africa) Teboho Mokoena	0	0	1	0	0	1
8	MD		(South Africa) Lebohang Maboe	0	0	0	0	1	1
8	DF	3	(South Africa) Teboho Mokoena	1	0	0	0	0	1
8	MD	11	(Chile) Marcelo Allende	1	0	0	0	0	1
8	FW		(South Africa) Haashim Domingo	1	0	0	0	0	1
8	DF		(South Africa) Sifiso Ngobeni	1	0	0	0	0	1
8	DF		(South Africa) Lyle Lakay	1	0	0	0	0	1
8	DF		(South Africa) Bradley Ralani	1	0	0	0	0	1
8	FW		(South Africa) Sipho Mbule	0	1	0	0	0	1

== Players ==
As of 16 August 2022

Note: Flags indicate national team as defined under FIFA eligibility rules; some limited exceptions apply. Players may hold more than one non-FIFA nationality.

No.	Pos.	Nation	Player
1	GK	ZAM	Kennedy Mweene
3	DF	RSA	Rushine De Reuck
4	MF	RSA	Teboho Mokoena
5	DF	RSA	Mosa Lebusa
6	DF	KEN	Brian Onyango
8	MF	RSA	Bongani Zungu
10	FW	URU	Gastón Sirino
11	FW	CHI	Marcelo Allende
12	FW	RSA	Thabiso Kutumela
14	GK	UGA	Denis Onyango
15	MF	RSA	Andile Jali
17	MF	RSA	Aubrey Modiba
18	MF	RSA	Themba Zwane
19	MF	RSA	Gift Motupa
20	DF	RSA	Grant Kekana
21	MF	RSA	Sphelele Mkhulise
22	FW	RSA	Lesedi Kapinga

No.	Pos.	Nation	Player
23	MF	RSA	Haashim Domingo
24	MF	RSA	Sipho Mbule
25	DF	RSA	Tokollo Mackenzie
26	MF	BOL	Erwin Saavedra
27	DF	RSA	Thapelo Morena
28	FW	ETH	Abubeker Nassir
29	MF	RSA	Bradley Ralani
31	FW	RSA	Pule Maraisane
32	GK	RSA	Ronwen Williams
33	FW	RSA	Lebohang Maboe
35	MF	RSA	Neo Maema
36	FW	RSA	Promise Mkhuma
38	FW	NAM	Peter Shalulile
40	DF	RSA	Rivaldo Coetzee
41	MF	RSA	Mothobi Mvala
—	MF	RSA	Cassius Mailula

== See also ==
- 2022-23 South African Premier Division
- 2022 MTN 8
- 2022-23 CAF Champions League
- 2020-21 Mamelodi Sundowns FC season
