= 2022 Carling Black Label Cup =

Tournament details
- Country: South Africa
- City: Johannesburg
- Venue(s): FNB Stadium, Soweto
- Date: 12 November 2022
- Teams: 4

Final positions
- Champions: Mamelodi Sundowns
- Runners-up: Orlando Pirates
- Third place: Kaizer Chiefs
- Fourth place: AmaZulu

Tournament statistics
- Matches played: 4
- Goals scored: 7 (1.75 per match)
- Top goal scorer(s): Cassius Mailula (3 goals)
- All statistics correct as of 12 November 2022.

The 2022 Carling Black Label Cup was an exhibition tournament between four teams held on 12 November 2022.

Following this season, the tournament was discontinued and merged into the 2023 Carling Knockout Cup.

== Teams ==
The sixteen Premiership teams were eligible for selection, with supporters casting votes, and the top four going forward to play in the tournament. Votes closed on 1 October 2022. Votes for the top four teams were as follows:

Final votes (1 October 2022)
Rank	Team	Number of Votes	ref.
1	Kaizer Chiefs	490 376	
2	Orlando Pirates	354 472	
3	Mamelodi Sundowns	171 717	
4	AmaZulu	144 829	

== Broadcast Coverage ==
South Africa		Ref.
SABC	SABC 1/SABC Sport	
SuperSport	Channel 202 Channel 209 (DStv South Africa)	

=== Venue ===
The tournament took place at the FNB Stadium located in Johannesburg, Soweto.

The exterior of the FNB Stadium

== Line-ups ==
The starting Line-ups for the tournament

=== AmaZulu F.C. ===
GK	Veli Mothwa
DF	Thembela Sikhakhane
DF	Ramahlwe Mphahlele
DF	Riaan Hanamub
DF	Abbubaker Mobara
MF	George Maluleka
MF	Sphesihle Maduna
MF	Msindisi Ndlovu
MF	Makhehlene Makhaula
FW	Gabadinho Mhango
FW	Lehlohonolo Majoro

=== Kaizer Chiefs F.C. ===
GK	Brandon Peterson
DF	Eric Mathoho
DF	Njabulo Ngcobo
DF	Sifiso Hlanti
DF	Edmilson Dove
MF	Kgaogelo Sekgota
MF	Yusuf Maart
MF	Njabulo Blom
MF	Nkosingiphile Ngcobo
MF	Keagan Dolly
FW	Khama Billiat

=== Mamelodi Sundowns F.C. ===
GK	Ronwen Williams
DF	Thapelo Morena
DF	Grant Kekana
DF	Rushine De Reuck
DF	Khuliso Mudau
MF	Themba Zwane
MF	Andile Jali
MF	Gastón Sirino
MF	Marcelo Allende
FW	Cassius Mailula
FW	Thabiso Kutumela

=== Orlando Pirates F.C. ===
GK	Richard Ofori
DF	Olisa Ndah
DF	Innocent Maela
DF	Paseka Mako
DF	Thabiso Monyane
MF	Ndabayithethwa Ndlondo
MF	Miguel Timm
MF	Ben Motshwari
MF	Fortune Makaringe
FW	Kermit Erasmus
FW	Monnapule Saleng

== Semi-finals ==
12 November 2022
09:30 SAST

Mamelodi Sundowns	3–0	AmaZulu
Mailula 5' Domingo 70' Ralani 73'	Report

FNB Stadium, Soweto
12 November 2022
12:00 SAST

Kaizer Chiefs	0–0	Orlando Pirates
	Report
Penalties
Alexander (penalty scored); Zwane (penalty scored); Maart (penalty scored); Shabalala (penalty scored); Solomons (penalty scored); Hlanti (penalty missed)	5-6	Hotto (penalty scored); Dlamini (penalty scored); Xoki (penalty scored); Makgaka (penalty scored); Lepasa (penalty scored); Pule (penalty scored)

FNB Stadium, Soweto

== 3rd Place Match ==
12 November 2022
15:30 SAST

AmaZulu	v	Kaizer Chiefs
Penalties
Majoro (penalty scored); Makhaula (penalty scored); Brooks (penalty missed); Bwalya (penalty missed)	2-4	Ngcobo (penalty scored); Kwinika (penalty missed); Frosler (penalty scored); Bvuma (penalty scored); Duba (penalty scored)

FNB Stadium, Soweto

== Final ==
12 November 2022
17:00 SAST
Final

Mamelodi Sundowns	4–0	Orlando Pirates
Mkhulise 23' Kekana 33' Mailula 34', 66'

FNB Stadium, Soweto

== Statistics ==
=== Goals ===
Rank	Name	Team	Number of goals
1	Cassius Mailula	Mamelodi Sundowns	3
2	Haashim Domingo	Mamelodi Sundowns	1
2	Bradley Ralani	Mamelodi Sundowns	1
2	Sphelele Mkhulise	Mamelodi Sundowns	1
2	Grant Kekana	Mamelodi Sundowns	1
