= Krok brothers =

South African businessmen (1929-2013 & 1930-2025)

- Born: Abe Krok: 29 May 1929; Solly Krok: 30 May 1929; Johannesburg, Gauteng, South Africa
- Died: Abe Krok: January 27, 2013 (aged 83); Solly Krok: February 9, 2025 (aged 95); South Africa
- Burial place: Westpark Jewish Cemetery, Johannesburg, South Africa
- Occupations: Entrepreneurs, philanthropists
- Known for: Gold Reef City, Apartheid Museum, Mamelodi Sundowns F.C.
- Spouses: Rita Krok (Solly Krok); Rosie Krok (Abe Krok)
- Children: Abe Krok: (Maxim Krok, Elana Pincus, Shelly Croock, Simone Lerman, David Krok, and Mark Krok; Solly Krok: (7 kids, 4 daughters and 3 sons including Arlene, Sharon and Loren)
- Relatives: Each other (twin brothers)

The Krok brothers (Abe Krok; 29 May 1929 - 27 January 2013 and Solly Krok; 30 May 1929 – 9 February 2025) were South African entrepreneurs and philanthropists known for their business ventures, including skin-lightening products, casinos and entertainment properties and their ownership of the Gold Reef City, Apartheid Museum and Mamelodi Sundowns F.C.

== Early life and business ventures ==
Solly and Abe Krok were identical twin brothers born an hour apart on 29 and 30 May 1929 in Johannesburg, South Africa to Jewish Lithuanian immigrant parents. Solly trained as an accountant, while Abe was a pharmacist. Their first major business venture was in the cosmetics industry, where they made their fortune selling skin-lightening creams during the apartheid era.

The twins started their business journey in 1953 when they bought their first pharmacy with a deposit of R400. From these humble beginnings, they grew Twins Products, which eventually became synonymous with skin-lightening creams.The brothers made a fortune selling these products, which included their popular SuperRose and He Man creams, aimed at black South Africans during the apartheid regime. At one point, it was estimated that one in three black women in the country used the Krok brothers' products. These creams, which contained hydroquinone, caused significant physical harm to users, leading to permanent skin damage. Despite the controversy, the brothers continued selling the products until a ban on hydroquinone in the late 1980s, which they initially fought and later accepted. The Kroks expanded their wealth by investing in entertainment and leisure properties. Some of their notable business acquisitions and developments include:

- Gold Reef City, one of South Africa’s premier entertainment and casino destinations.
- Apartheid Museum, was stablished in 2001 as part of Gold Reef City’s casino license bid.
- Summer Place, one of South Africa's luxury venues for high-end events.
- Mamelodi Sundowns F.C., the South African football club since the late 1980s before selling it to billionaire Patrice Motsepe in 2004. They bought the team from Standard Bank after it repossessed it from Zola Mahobe
- Gold Reef Resorts Limited, a company they later merged with Tsogo Sun in a $2.23 billion deal in 2011.

== Philanthropy and legacy ==
The Kroks were well-known philanthropists. Their charitable activities included supporting Jewish causes, educational institutions, and social welfare projects. They were major benefactors of the Johannesburg Holocaust & Genocide Centre and contributed to institutions such as Torah Academy, Yeshivah Gedolah, and Bar-Ilan University.

Solly Krok was particularly passionate about charity and was involved in fundraising projects such as the Mock Wedding and the Millionex Charity Raffle, which predated South Africa’s national lottery. He also launched the Touchdown Challenge to promote health among senior

== Abe Krok family feud ==
In the final years of his life, Abe Krok’s family was embroiled in a legal battle over control of his vast fortune. The dispute arose as Krok, suffering from dementia and Parkinson’s disease, was declared incapable of managing his own affairs. Five of his six children—Elana Pincus, Shelly Croock, Simone Lerman, David Krok, and Mark Krok—filed a High Court application to appoint a curator to take over his estate, arguing that their father was vulnerable to undue influence. The court case revealed deep divisions within the Krok family. Krok’s eldest son, Maxim Krok, along with Krok’s wife of 26 years, Rosie Krok, opposed the appointment of a curator unless one of them was selected for the role. The five siblings accused Maxim of coercing their ailing father into signing documents that he did not fully understand. In response, Maxim and Rosie alleged that the other siblings were primarily motivated by a desire to control the family trusts, which were worth hundreds of millions of rands.

Further controversy arose around allegations that Rosie Krok was an excessive internet gambler, with claims that she had incurred substantial debts that were later covered by the family trusts. However, Rosie maintained that she had been a supportive wife and rejected claims of financial recklessness. Following legal proceedings, the High Court in Johannesburg ruled in favor of appointing a curator, effectively stripping Krok of all decision-making powers over his estate. The ruling allowed the trustees to act without Krok’s consent if he was deemed incapable of making financial decisions. The case highlighted long-standing tensions within the Krok family and drew public attention to the internal power struggle over the family's considerable wealth.

== Controversies/unresolved crimes ==
Their success was not without controversy. During apartheid, the skin-lightening products they sold were widely criticised for reinforcing harmful racial stigmas and perpetuating the colonised mindset imposed on Black and indigenous peoples.

== Deaths ==
Abe Krok died on 27 January 2013 at the age of 82 while Solly Krok died on 9 February 2025 at 95.
