= Wedson =

Wedson is a masculine given name. Notable people with the name include:

- Wedson Anselme (born 1986), Haitian footballer
- Wedson Nyirenda (born 1966), Zambian footballer and manager
