= Sizwe Motaung =

South African soccer player (1970-2001)

Personal information
- Full name: Sizwe Wesley Motaung
- Date of birth: 7 January 1970
- Place of birth: Newcastle, South Africa
- Date of death: 16 August 2001 (aged 31)
- Place of death: Newcastle, South Africa
- Height: 1.82 m (5 ft 11 1/2 in)
- Position: Defender

Youth career
- Chippa's Dynamos
- Durban Leeds United

Senior career*
Years	Team	Apps	(Gls)
1991–1993	Jomo Cosmos		
1994–1996	Mamelodi Sundowns		
1996–1997	St. Gallen	15	(0)
1997–1998	CD Tenerife	13	(0)
1998–2000	Kaizer Chiefs		
2000–2001	Orlando Pirates		

International career
1992–1997	South Africa	49	(0)
- * Club domestic league appearances and goals

Sizwe Motaung (7 January 1970 – 16 August 2001) was a South African football player who played for Jomo Cosmos, Mamelodi Sundowns, St. Gallen, CD Tenerife, Kaizer Chiefs and Orlando Pirates, as well at international level for the national side. He was part of the squad that won the 1996 African Cup of Nations.

Motaung scored one of the goals in Sundowns' losing effort in the 1994 BP Top 8 final.

He died of an AIDS-related disease at his home in Newcastle on 16 August 2001, at the age of 31.
