= Thabiso Kutumela =

South African soccer player

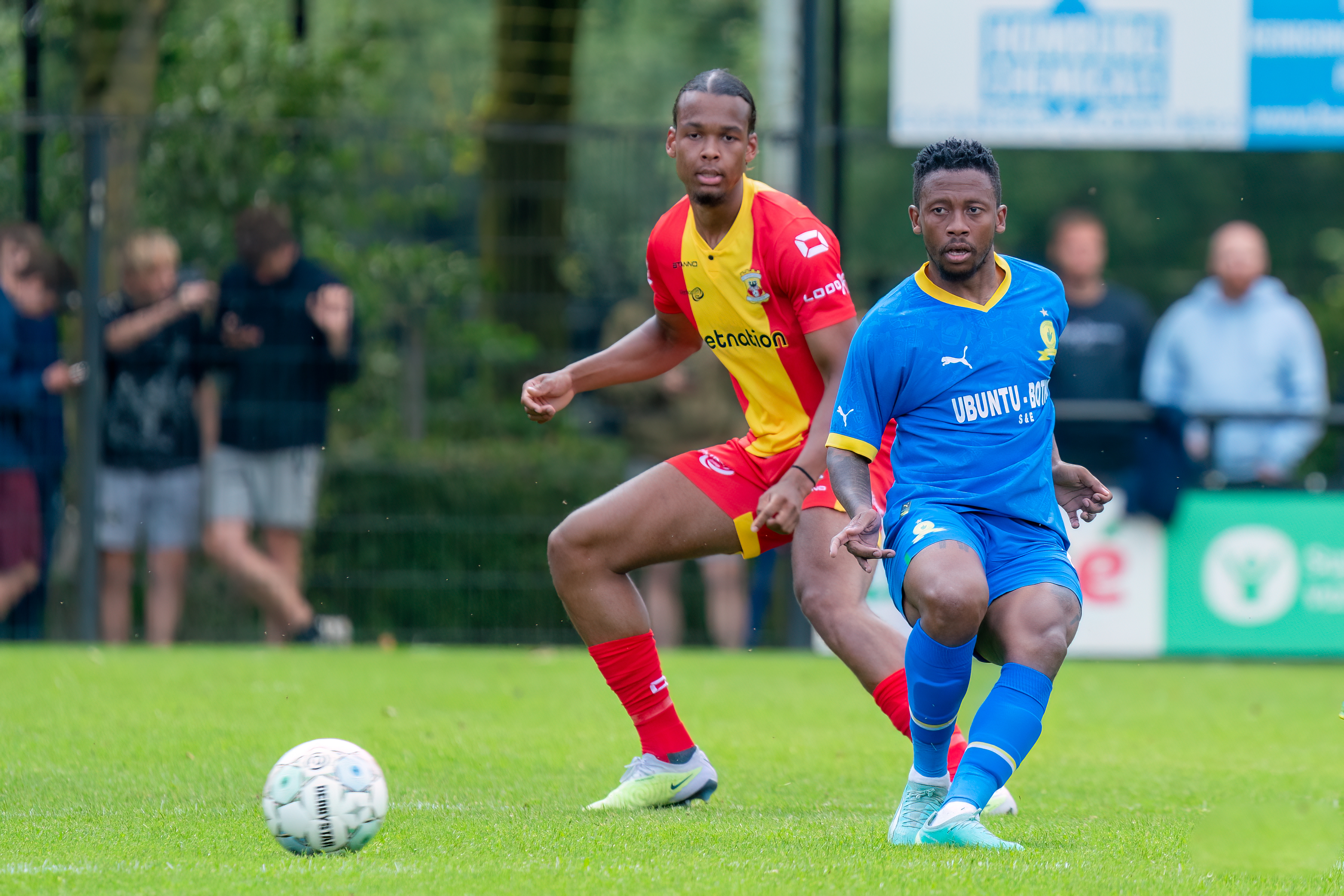
- Kutumela (blue, 2023)

Personal information
- Full name: Thabiso Simon Kutumela
- Date of birth: 2 July 1993 (age 33)
- Place of birth: Mokopane, South Africa
- Position: Striker

Team information
- Current team: AmaZulu
- Number: 10

Senior career*
Years	Team	Apps	(Gls)
2014–2016	Baroka	77	(28)
2016–2018	Orlando Pirates	24	(3)
2019–2021	Maritzburg United	61	(20)
2021–2024	Mamelodi Sundowns	23	(3)
2023–2024	→ Cape Town City (loan)	26	(3)
2024–2025	Richards Bay	11	(1)
2025–	AmaZulu	6	(0)

International career^{‡}
2016	South Africa Olympic	1	(0)
2016–	South Africa	9	(2)
- * Club domestic league appearances and goals as of 4 January 2026 ‡ National team caps and goals as of 16 March 2024

Thabiso Kutumela (born 1 July 1993) is a South African professional soccer player who plays as a striker for AmaZulu.

Kutumela joined Mamelodi Sundowns from Maritzburg United in 2021.

Kutumela made his debut for the South Africa national team at the 2016 COSAFA Cup. He represented South Africa in the soccer competition at the 2016 Summer Olympics.

== International career ==
=== International goals ===
Scores and results list South Africa's goal tally first.

Goal	Date	Venue	Opponent	Score	Result	Competition
1.	22 June 2016	Sam Nujoma Stadium, Windhoek, Namibia	Swaziland	1–1	5–1	Friendly
2.	25 June 2016	Sam Nujoma Stadium, Windhoek, Namibia	Botswana	2–1	3–2	Friendly

== Honours ==
Baroka F.C.

- National First Division - 2015–16 National First Division

Mamelodi Sundowns F.C.

- South African Premier Division - 20/21
- Nedbank Cup - 2021–22 Nedbank Cup
- MTN 8 - 2021 MTN 8
