= Nyiko Mobbie =

South African soccer player

Personal information
- Full name: Nyiko Sydney Mobbie
- Date of birth: 11 September 1994 (age 32)
- Place of birth: Xikundu, Malamulele, South Africa
- Height: 1.80 m (5 ft 11 in)
- Position: Right back

Team information
- Current team: SuperSport United
- Number: 2

Youth career
- FC Basel
- Free State Stars

Senior career*
| Years | Team | Apps | (Gls) |
| 2016–2019 | Free State Stars | 58 | (1) |
| 2019–2022 | Mamelodi Sundowns | 0 | (0) |
| 2019–2020 | → Stellenbosch (loan) | 27 | (1) |
| 2020–2021 | → Chippa United (loan) | 20 | (0) |
| 2021–2022 | → Sekhukhune United (loan) | 22 | (1) |
| 2022–2024 | Sekhukhune United | 54 | (0) |
| 2024– | SuperSport United | 0 | (0) |

International career^{‡}
| 2019– | South Africa | 27 | (0) |
- * Club domestic league appearances and goals as of 17 August 2024 ‡ National team caps and goals as of 16:32, 4 July 2024 (UTC)

Nyiko Sydney Mobbie (born 11 September 1994) is a South African professional soccer player who plays as a right back for SuperSport United and the South African national team.

== Club career ==
=== Free State Stars ===
Born in Xikundu, Malamulele, South Africa, After playing amateur football for local side FC Basel, he joined Free State Stars in 2014. He made his debut on 11 May 2016 in a 2–2 draw at home to Kaizer Chiefs. He scored once in 58 appearances before the club were relegated to the National First Division in 2019.

=== Mamelodi Sundowns ===
Following Free State Stars' relegation, Mobbie signed for Mamelodi Sundowns in summer 2019. However, Mobbie was left out of the club's pre-season training camp and signed for Stellenbosch on a season-long loan in August. He scored once in 27 league appearances for Stellenbosch. In December 2020, Mobbie joined Chippa United on loan until the end of the season. He made 20 league appearances for Chippa United. On 9 September 2021, it was announced that Mobbie had joined Sekhukhune United on a season-long loan, with the deal having been completed a week before. The move became permanent ahead of the 2022–23 season.

== International career ==
Mobbie made his debut for the South African national team on 4 August 2019 in a 3–0 2020 African Nations Championship qualification defeat to Lesotho. He made 5 appearances at the 2021 COSAFA Cup tournament, which South Africa won after beating Senegal in the final.

== Career statistics ==
=== International ===
As of match played on 26 March 2024.

| National team | Year | Apps | Goals |
|---|---|---|---|
| South Africa | 2019 | 1 | 0 |
| South Africa | 2021 | 11 | 0 |
| South Africa | 2022 | 5 | 0 |
| South Africa | 2023 | 5 | 0 |
| South Africa | 2024 | 5 | 0 |
| Total | | 27 | 0 |

== Honours ==
South Africa

- Africa Cup of Nations third place: 2023
