= 2001 BP Top 8 =

Tournament details
- Date: 4 August to 1 September 2001
- Teams: 8

Final positions
- Champions: Kaizer Chiefs (12th title)
- Runners-up: Mamelodi Sundowns

The BP Top 8 2001 was the 27th edition of the competition, then known as the BP Top 8 for sponsorship reasons, featuring the top 8-placed teams at the conclusion of the Premiership season.

It was won for the twelfth time by Kaizer Chiefs, their first Top 8 title in the PSL-era.

After Sundowns had lost the penalty shootout, Daniel Mudau, who had scored both Sundown's goals, but was substituted shortly before Chief's last-minute equaliser, struck teammate Charles Motlohi, believing he had refused to take a crucial penalty. Mudau subsequently apologised.

== Teams ==
The following 8 teams are listed according to their final position on the league table in the previous season of the Premiership.

1. Orlando Pirates
2. Kaizer Chiefs
3. Mamelodi Sundowns
4. Jomo Cosmos
5. Santos
6. Free State Stars
7. Ria Stars
8. SuperSport United

== Final ==
1 September 2001

Kaizer Chiefs	2–2	Mamelodi Sundowns
Zwane 27'; Nzama 90'		Mudau 44'; Mudau 79'
Penalties
	7–6

FNB Stadium, Johannesburg
