= 2021 MTN 8 =

Tournament details
- Country: South Africa
- Dates: 14 August 2021 – 30 October 2021
- Teams: 8

Final positions
- Champions: Mamelodi Sundowns (4th title)
- Runners-up: Cape Town City

Tournament statistics
- Matches played: 9
- Goals scored: 25 (2.78 per match)

The 2021 MTN 8 was the 47th edition of South Africa's annual soccer cup competition, the MTN 8. It featured the top eight teams of the Premier Soccer League at the end of the 2020–21 season.

Orlando Pirates were defending champions, but were eliminated by Swallows.

== Teams ==
The eight teams competing in the MTN 8 knockout competition are (listed according to their finishing position in the 2020/2021 Premier Soccer League Season):

1. Mamelodi Sundowns
2. AmaZulu
3. Orlando Pirates
4. Golden Arrows
5. SuperSport United
6. Swallows
7. Cape Town City
8. Kaizer Chiefs

== Quarter-finals ==
14 August 2021

| Golden Arrows | 2–2 (a.e.t.) | SuperSport United |
|---|---|---|
| 50' Mutizwa; 118' Gumede | Report | 78' Lungu; 99' Rayners |
Penalties
| | 4–3 |

Princess Magogo Stadium, KwaMashu
Attendance: 0
14 August 2021

| Orlando Pirates | 1–2 | Swallows |
|---|---|---|
| 30' Dlamini | Report | 16' Gamildien; 23' Gamildien |

Orlando Stadium, Soweto
Attendance: 0
15 August 2021

| Mamelodi Sundowns | 2–2 (a.e.t.) | Kaizer Chiefs |
|---|---|---|
| 10' Shalulile; 23' Zwane | Report | 38' Parker; 59' Billiat |
Penalties
| | 2–1 |

Lucas Masterpieces Moripe Stadium, Durban
Attendance: 0
15 August 2021

| AmaZulu | 1–2 | Cape Town City |
|---|---|---|
| 54' Majoro | Report | 8' Mashego; 46' Morris |

Moses Mabhida Stadium, Durban
Attendance: 0

== Semi-finals ==
28 August 2021

| Golden Arrows | 1–1 | Mamelodi Sundowns |
|---|---|---|
| Dlamini 6' | Report | Safranko 85' |

Sugar Ray Xulu Stadium, Clermont, Durban
Attendance: 0
28 September 2021

| Mamelodi Sundowns | 3–0 | Golden Arrows |
|---|---|---|
| Shalulile 4'; Lunga 29'; Maema 94' | Report |

Lucas Masterpieces Moripe Stadium, Atteridgeville, Pretoria
Attendance: 0

Mamelodi Sundowns win 4–1 on aggregate.

29 August 2021

| Cape Town City | 0–0 | Swallows |
|---|---|---|
| | Report |

Athlone Stadium, Cape Town
Attendance: 0
29 September 2021

| Swallows | 0–4 | Cape Town City |
|---|---|---|
| | Report |

Dobsonville Stadium, Soweto
Attendance: 0

Cape Town City win 4–0 on aggregate.

== Final ==
30 October 2021
18:00

| Cape Town City | 1–1 (a.e.t.) | Mamelodi Sundowns |
|---|---|---|
| Fagrie Lakay 75' | | Thapelo Morena 24' |
Penalties
| Mayo (penalty missed); Lakay (penalty missed); Mashego (penalty scored); Ajagun (penalty missed); Makola (penalty scored); Fielies (penalty missed); Mkhize (penalty missed) | 2-3 | Domingo (penalty missed); Vilakazi (penalty missed); Jali (penalty scored); Modiba (penalty missed); Maema (penalty scored); Lebusa (penalty missed); Shalulile (penalty scored) |

Moses Mabhida Stadium, Durban
Attendance: 2000
Referee: Thando Ndzandzeka
