= 1994 BP Top 8 =

Tournament details
- Teams: 8

Final positions
- Champions: Kaizer Chiefs (11th title)
- Runners-up: Mamelodi Sundowns

The BP Top 8 1994 was the 23rd edition of the competition, then known as the BP Top 8 for sponsorship reasons, featuring the top 8-placed teams at the conclusion of the NSL season.

It was won for the eleventh time by Kaizer Chiefs.

== Teams ==
The following 8 teams are listed according to their final position on the league table in the 1993 NSL.

1. Mamelodi Sundowns
2. Moroka Swallows
3. AmaZulu
4. Orlando Pirates
5. Umtata Bucks
6. Kaizer Chiefs
7. Hellenic
8. Chatsworth Rangers

== Final ==
Kaizer Chiefs	3–2	Mamelodi Sundowns
Nyirenda; Nyirenda; Maringa		Motaung; Mudau

FNB Stadium, Johannesburg
