= Zola Mahobe =

Former owner of Mamelodi Sundowns (1954–2013)

- Born: 1954; Sophiatown, Johannesburg, South Africa
- Died: 14 December 2013 (aged 58–59); Soweto, Gauteng, South Africa
- Other names: Mr Cool, Mr Big Bucks
- Occupation: Businessman
- Spouse: Siza Mahobe
- Children: 2

Daniel Zola Mahobe (1954 – 14 December 2013) was a South African businessman and former owner of Mamelodi Sundowns F.C. from 1985 to 1988.

Mahobe played a pivotal role in transforming Mamelodi Sundowns into one of South Africa's top professional football clubs. He was instrumental in the team's rise to prominence during the 1980s, competing with the likes of Orlando Pirates and Kaizer Chiefs in the national league. By funnelling a lot of money in appointing top coaches and recruiting talented players, he helped establish Sundowns as a football powerhouse.

He also introduced the club's famous nickname, ‘Brazilians,’ after changing the team's kits to resemble those of the Brazil national football team. However, his tenure as owner ended in 1988 when Standard Bank repossessed the club after it was discovered that he had used stolen bank funds to purchase and finance the team.

== Early life and business ==
Zola Mahobe attended Meadowlands High School in Soweto. In 1971, he secured his first job as a general worker at an international company in Johannesburg. He remained there for ten years, demonstrating perseverance before rising to prominence as a stylish and flamboyant businessman.

In 1985, Mahobe purchased Mamelodi Sundowns F.C., a struggling club on the brink of disbandment after failing to secure promotion to the National Professional Soccer League throughout the 1970s. He acquired the team from its two Marabastad owners, Dr Bonny Sebotsane and Dr Motsiri Itsweng. That same year, the National Soccer League (NSL) was established, and Sundowns became one of its founding teams.

Mahobe made immediate changes to the club's management. When coach Dave Barber failed to deliver strong performances in the NSL, Mahobe dismissed him and appointed Walter da Silva. However, da Silva resigned after a few months, citing Mahobe's excessive interference in coaching decisions. Mahobe then hired Ben Segale, under whom Sundowns secured four consecutive victories and finished 11th in the 1985 NSL season.

The following year, Sundowns improved significantly, finishing in 7th place and winning the Mainstay Cup, defeating Jomo Cosmos 1–0 in the final. By the 1987 NSL season, with Stanley "Screamer" Tshabalala as head coach, the team secured a 3rd-place finish.

Under Mahobe's leadership, Sundowns attracted top talents by offering lucrative salaries. Star players included Mark Anderson, who was voted Footballer of the Year in 1986, as well as Trott Moloto, Mike Ntombela, Pitso Mosimane, Mike Mangena, William Zondi, Andries Maseko, and Trevor Klein. The club went on to win major tournaments, including Africa's Champions League, the BP Top 8, the JPS Cup, and the Castle League Championship.

Journalist Lukanyo Mnyanda compared Mahobe's impact on South African football to that of Manchester City’s Abu Dhabi owners, crediting him with transforming Sundowns into a major force in the league.

=== Other businesses ===
Beyond football, Mahobe was a successful entrepreneur with multiple business ventures. He managed his enterprises from an office on Johannesburg's Elloff Street and owned a butchery and several liquor stores in downtown Johannesburg and Pietersburg (now Polokwane). He also acquired a hotel near Turfloop University and owned various properties in Soweto and a luxury apartment in Rosebank. Additionally, he possessed an extensive collection of luxury vehicles and even owned a racehorse.

== Arrest and sentencing ==
In 1988, Zola Mahobe was arrested after it was discovered that he had stolen money from Standard Bank to finance his businesses and lavish lifestyle. His girlfriend, Snowy Moshoeshoe, who worked as a bank teller at the bank, had been fraudulently transferring money into his account for five years, totaling R10 million.

The scheme unraveled in May 1987 when Mahobe, while on a trip to Germany, attempted to purchase a Mercedes-Benz 500SEL. The dealership advised him that it would be cheaper to buy the car in South Africa due to exchange rate costs. The dealership in Germany then contacted Mercedes-Benz agents in South Africa to arrange the purchase, which triggered an alert at Standard Bank.

On that particular day, Moshoeshoe was on leave, and another bank employee handled the inquiry. This led to the discovery of the fraudulent transactions, exposing the five-year-long theft. A police investigation was launched, and Moshoeshoe was arrested. Meanwhile, Mahobe fled to Botswana, prompting South African authorities to issue a R50,000 bounty for his capture. After nine months on the run, he was arrested by Botswana police and extradited to South Africa to face trial. Mahobe stood trial in July 1988, where the court heard that 93 fraudulent transactions had been made to his account between 1983 and 1987, totaling R10.3 million. He pleaded not guilty, claiming he was unaware that the money had been stolen. He argued that he believed the funds came from cattle sales in Lesotho, allegedly conducted by Moshoeshoe's relatives, who were descendants of King Moshoeshoe. However, Snowy Moshoeshoe pleaded guilty. On 12 January 1989, Mahobe was sentenced to 29 years in prison. He ultimately served 16 years, with the remainder of the sentence suspended under the condition that he did not reoffend. Moshoeshoe, having shown remorse, received a lighter sentence of 8 years. Mahobe served his time at Barberton Maximum Prison in Mpumalanga, where he converted to Islam. His assets, including his ownership of Mamelodi Sundowns and plush residences, were seized by the state to recover the stolen funds.
