= Bongolwethu Siyasi =

South African footballer

Personal information
- Date of birth: 22 September 2002 (age 24)
- Place of birth: Khayelitsha, Western Cape, South Africa
- Position: Defender

Team information
- Current team: Venda (on loan from Mamelodi Sundowns)

Youth career
- Chumisa
- YBC
- 2014–2019: Ajax Cape Town

Senior career*
Years	Team	Apps	(Gls)
2019–2021	Ajax Cape Town	5	(0)
2022–	Mamelodi Sundowns	0	(0)
2023	→ Venda (loan)	15	(0)
2023	→ Tuks (loan)	7	(0)
2024–	→ Venda (loan)	15	(0)

International career
2018	South Africa U17	8	(1)
- * Club domestic league appearances and goals as of 15 October 2024

Bongolwethu Siyasi (born 22 September 2002) is a South African soccer player playing as a defender for Venda, on loan from Mamelodi Sundowns.

== Club career ==
Born in Khayelitsha, Western Cape, Siyasi began his career with amateur sides Chumisa FC and YBC FC, before a move to Ajax Cape Town in 2014, where he was lauded by coach Duncan Crowie as one of the best players in the young team. He left Ajax Cape Town in January 2021 by mutual consent.

Returning to football in 2022 with Mamelodi Sundowns, he made his debut in the Carling Black Label Cup in November 2022. In January 2023, he was loaned to Motsepe Foundation Championship side Venda. In the summer of 2023, he was loaned to University of Pretoria (Tuks) in the same division.

== International career ==
Siyasi has represented South Africa at under-17 level.

== Career statistics ==
=== Club ===
As of 28 January 2023.

Appearances and goals by club, season and competition
Club	Season	League			National Cup		League Cup		Continental		Other		Total	
Club	Season	Division	Apps	Goals	Apps	Goals	Apps	Goals	Apps	Goals	Apps	Goals	Apps	Goals
Ajax Cape Town	2019–20	National First Division	5	0	0	0	0	0	–		0	0	5	0
Mamelodi Sundowns	2022–23	South African Premier Division	0	0	0	0	0	0	–		1 (Note: Appearances in the Carling Black Label Cup)	0	1	0
Venda	2022–23	National First Division	3	0	0	0	0	0	–		0	0	3	0
Career total			8	0	0	0	0	0	0	0	1	0	9	0
