= Sifiso Ngobeni =

South African soccer player

Personal information
- Date of birth: 8 February 1997 (age 29)
- Place of birth: Mamelodi, South Africa
- Position: Left back

Team information
- Current team: TS Galaxy
- Number: 25

Senior career*
Years	Team	Apps	(Gls)
2019–2021	Bloemfontein Celtic	41	(0)
2021–	Mamelodi Sundowns	15	(0)
2022	→ SuperSport United (loan)	7	(0)
2024–2025	→ AmaZulu (loan)	2	(0)
2025-2026	Cape Town City	0	(0)
2026-	TS Galaxy	2	(0)

International career^{‡}
2021	South Africa	5	(0)
- * Club domestic league appearances and goals as of 30 September 2024 ‡ National team caps and goals as of 30 September 2024

Sifiso Ngobeni (born 8 February 1997) is a South African professional soccer player who plays as a left back for TS Galaxy F.C.. He has been capped for the South African national team.

== Early life ==
Ngobeni was born in and grew up in Mamelodi and grew up supporting Mamelodi Sundowns.

== Club career ==
Ngobeni started his career at Bloemfontein Celtic in 2019, making his debut in a 0–0 draw with Chippa United on 21 September. He made 20 appearances during the 2019–20 season and 21 during the 2020–21 season. In July 2021, Ngobeni signed for reigning Premier Division champions Mamelodi Sundowns on a five-year contract.

== Cape town City ==
On august 7th 2025 Cape Town City announced that they had signed Ngobeni on a Free Transfer. He left at the end of the 2025/26 season after his contract was terminated.

== TS Galaxy ==
In july 2026 Ngobeni joined TS Galaxy.

== National career ==
Ngobeni represented South Africa at the 2021 COSAFA Cup, making 5 appearances as South Africa won the tournament.
