= Brian Onyango =

Kenyan footballer

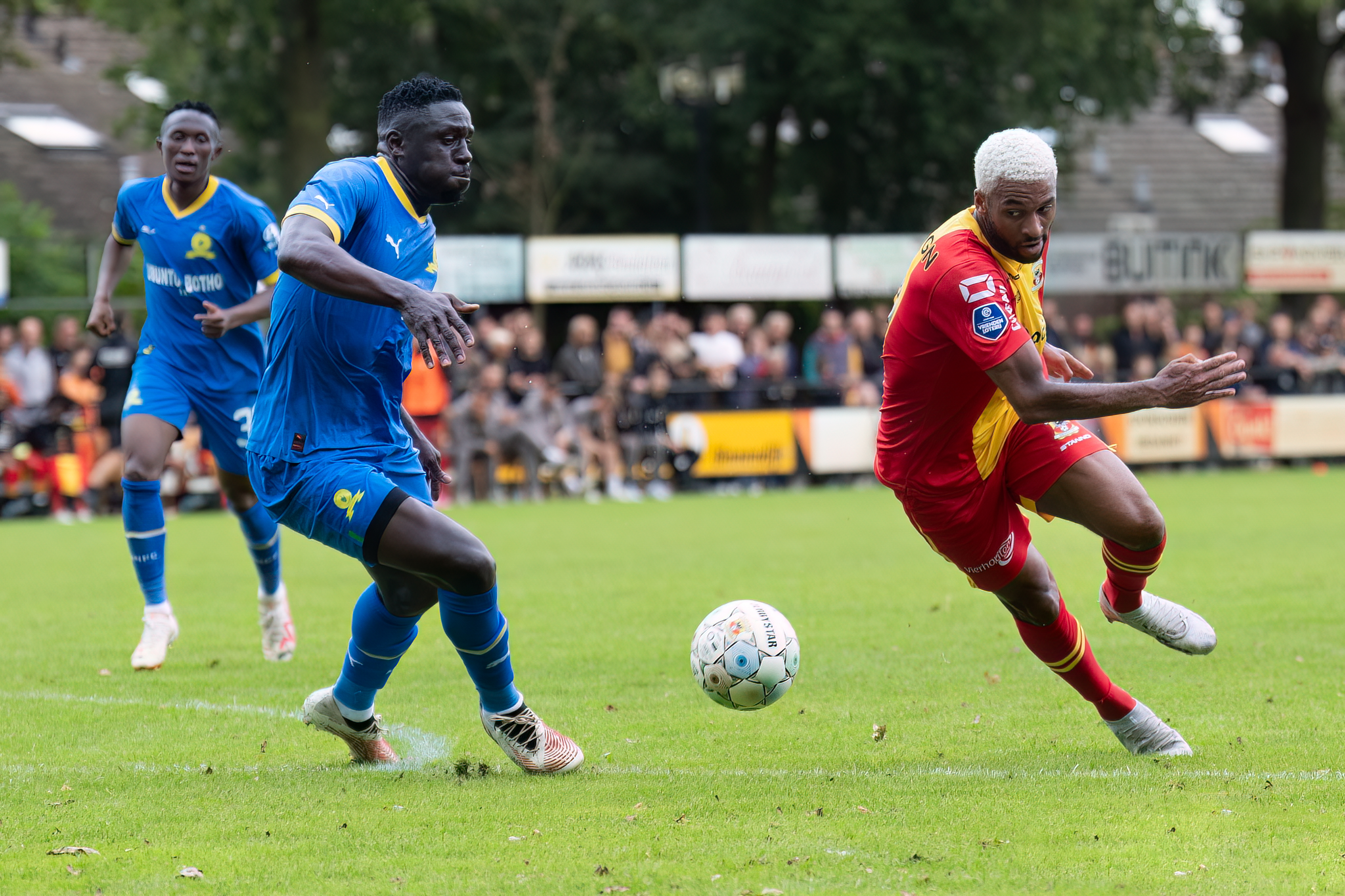
- Onyango (centre, 2023)

Personal information
- Full name: Brian Mandela Onyango
- Date of birth: 24 July 1994 (age 32)
- Place of birth: Nairobi, Kenya
- Height: 1.81 m (5 ft 11 1/2 in)
- Position: Centre-back

Team information
- Current team: Stellenbosch
- Number: 2

Senior career*
Years	Team	Apps	(Gls)
2010	Posta Rangers		
2011–2012	Tusker		
2012–2015	Santos	48	(3)
2015–2019	Maritzburg United	77	(8)
2020–2024	Mamelodi Sundowns	34	(1)
2024–	Stellenbosch	1	(0)

International career^{‡}
2011–	Kenya	41	(2)
- * Club domestic league appearances and goals as of 15 October 2024 ‡ National team caps and goals as of 24 July 2026

Brian Mandela Onyango (born 24 July 1994) is a Kenyan professional footballer who plays as a centre-back for Stellenbosch and the Kenya national team.

== Career statistics ==
=== International ===
As of match played 7 June 2025

Appearances and goals by national team and year
National team	Year	Apps	Goals
Kenya	2011	5	1
Kenya	2012	5	0
Kenya	2013	4	0
Kenya	2014	–	
Kenya	2015	3	0
Kenya	2016	8	1
Kenya	2017	4	0
Kenya	2018	2	0
Kenya	2019	1	0
Kenya	2020	3	0
Kenya	2021	–	
Kenya	2022	–	
Kenya	2023	4	0
Kenya	2024	–	
Kenya	2025	2	0
Total		41	2

Scores and results list Kenya's goal tally first, score column indicates score after each Onyango goal.

List of international goals scored by Brian Onyango
No.	Date	Venue	Cap	Opponent	Score	Result	Competition
1	15 November 2011	Nyayo National Stadium, Nairobi, Kenya	2	Seychelles	1–0	4–0	2014 FIFA World Cup qualification
2	31 May 2016	Moi International Sports Centre, Nairobi, Kenya	20	Sudan	1–1	4–1	Friendly
