= Daniel Mudau =

South African soccer player

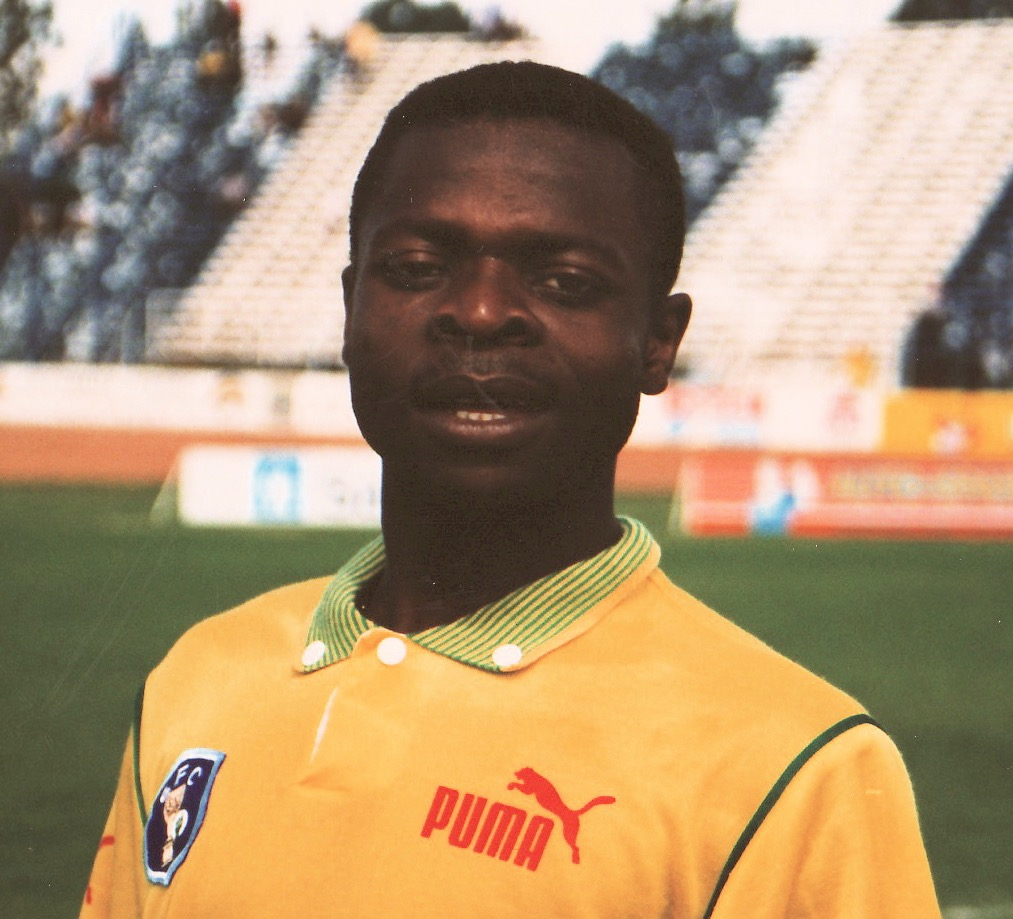
- Mudau in 1995

Personal information
- Full name: Daniel Mbulaheni Mudau
- Date of birth: 4 September 1968 (age 58)
- Place of birth: Mamelodi, South Africa
- Position: Striker

Senior career*
| Years | Team | Apps | (Gls) |
| 1991 | Ratanang Maholosiane | 37 | (7) |
| 1992–2003 | Mamelodi Sundowns | 351 | (155) |
| Total | | 388 | (162) |

International career
| 1993–2000 | South Africa | 16 | (3) |
- * Club domestic league appearances and goals

Daniel Mudau (born 4 September 1968) is a South African former soccer player who played at both professional and international levels as a striker.

== Early life ==
Daniel Mbulaheni Mudau was born on 4 September 1968 in Mamelodi.

== Career ==
Mudau played club football for Ratanang Maholosiane and Mamelodi Sundowns; he also earned sixteen caps for the South African national side between 1993 and 2000, scoring 3 goals.

He is the all-time top goal scorer for the Mamelodi Sundowns.

Mudau scored one of the goals in Sundowns' losing effort in the 1994 BP Top 8 final.

Mudau was also known for an incident in the aftermath of Sundown's penalty shootout loss to Kaizer Chiefs in the 2001 BP Top 8 final. Mudau, who had scored both Sundown's goals, but was substituted shortly before Chief's last-minute equaliser, struck teammate Charles Motlohi, believing he had refused to take a crucial penalty. Mudau subsequently apologised.

== International career ==
He made his debut on 6 October 1993 in a 4-0 loss against Mexico. Mudau scored his first goal in a 3-2 win over Mozambique in the 70th minute on 30 September 1995. His last international came exactly 4 years later versus Saudi Arabia. He was part of the squad that won the 1996 African Cup of Nations.

== Career statistics ==
=== International goals ===
| # | Date | Venue | Opponent | Score | Result | Competition |
|---|---|---|---|---|---|---|
| 1. | 30 September 1995 | FNB Stadium, Johannesburg, South Africa | Mozambique | 3–2 | Win | Friendly |
| 2. | 9 May 1999 | National Stadium, Kingston, Jamaica | Jamaica | 1–1 | Draw | Friendly |
| 3. | 20 June 1999 | Estádio da Cidadela, Luanda, Angola | Angola | 2–2 | Draw | 2000 African Nations Cup qual. |
Correct as of 9 March 2017
