= Khuliso Mudau =

South African soccer player (born 1995)

Personal information
- Full name: Khuliso Johnson Mudau
- Date of birth: 26 April 1995 (age 31)
- Place of birth: Musina, South Africa
- Height: 1.81 m (5 ft 11 in)
- Position: Right back

Team information
- Current team: Mamelodi Sundowns
- Number: 25

Senior career*
Years	Team	Apps	(Gls)
- JDR Stars
2016–2017	Magesi	18	(1)
2017–2020	Black Leopards	63	(2)
2020–	Mamelodi Sundowns	92	(3)

International career^{‡}
2022–	South Africa	36	(1)
- * Club domestic league appearances and goals as of 3 January 2026 ‡ National team caps and goals as of 29 June 2026

Khuliso Johnson Mudau, also known as Sailorman (born 26 April 1995) is a South African professional soccer player who plays as a right back for Betway Premiership club Mamelodi Sundowns and the South Africa national team.

Mudau began his club career with JDR Stars in the third tier, then known as the Vodacom League, in 2015. He joined newly promoted Magesi in the National First Division in 2016 and made 18 appearances during his first season in professional football, although the club were relegated at the end of the campaign. He remained in the second tier, signing for his hometown club, Black Leopards, at the start of the 2017–18 season. In his first season with Leopards, he helped the club secure promotion to the Premier Soccer League through the promotion play-offs. He made more than 70 appearances in all competitions for the club, attracting interest from several leading PSL sides before joining Mamelodi Sundowns in 2020. Mudau won the Premier Soccer League title in his first season with Sundowns, earning his first major honour. He established himself as a regular first-team player during the 2021–22 season and made his senior international debut for South Africa.

== Club career ==
Born in Musina, Limpopo, Mudau started his football career at Benny’s Care Sport, where he played alongside future Black Leopards teammate Lesedi Kapinga. In 2015, he signed for JDR Stars of the Vodacom League. He spent one season with the club, helping them win their regional league title and qualify for the national playoffs. JDR Stars were unable to secure promotion, however, as they were eliminated in the group stage. Mudau nevertheless impressed during the playoffs, attracting interest from fellow group-stage participants Magesi, who went on to win promotion to the National First Division as champions.

After playing for JDR Stars, Magesi and Black Leopards, he signed for Mamelodi Sundowns on a five-year contract in October 2020.

He scored in the first goal in 3–0 win against Malian side Stade Malien in the 2025–26 CAF Champions League first leg quarterfinal.

Mudau was awarded the Outstanding Footballer of the Year in 2026 by the Icons of Africa Awards.

== International career ==
On 1 December 2025, Mudau was called up to the South Africa squad for the 2025 Africa Cup of Nations.

On 28 May 2026, he was selected by manager Hugo Broos to represent his nation at the 2026 FIFA World Cup.

== Style of play ==
Mudau plays as a right back. He also specialises as a midfielder.

== Career statistics ==
=== International ===
As of match played 26 January 2024

Appearances and goals by national team and year
National team	Year	Apps	Goals
South Africa	2022	4	0
South Africa	2023	3	1
South Africa	2024	4	0
Total		11	1

International goals

Scores and results list South Africa's goal tally first.

No.	Date	Venue	Opponent	Score	Result	Competition
1.	18 November 2023	Moses Mabhida Stadium, Durban, South Africa	Benin	2–0	2–1	2026 FIFA World Cup qualification

== Honours ==
South Africa

- Africa Cup of Nations third place: 2023

Mamelodi Sundowns

- CAF Champions League: 2025–26
- CAF Champions League runners-up: 2024–25
- African Football League: 2023
- South African Premiership: 2021–22, 2022–23, 2023–24, 2024–25
- Nedbank Cup: 2021–22
- MTN 8: 2021

Individual

- 2026 Icons of Africa Awards: Outstanding Footballer of the Year
