= Surprise Ralani =

South African soccer player

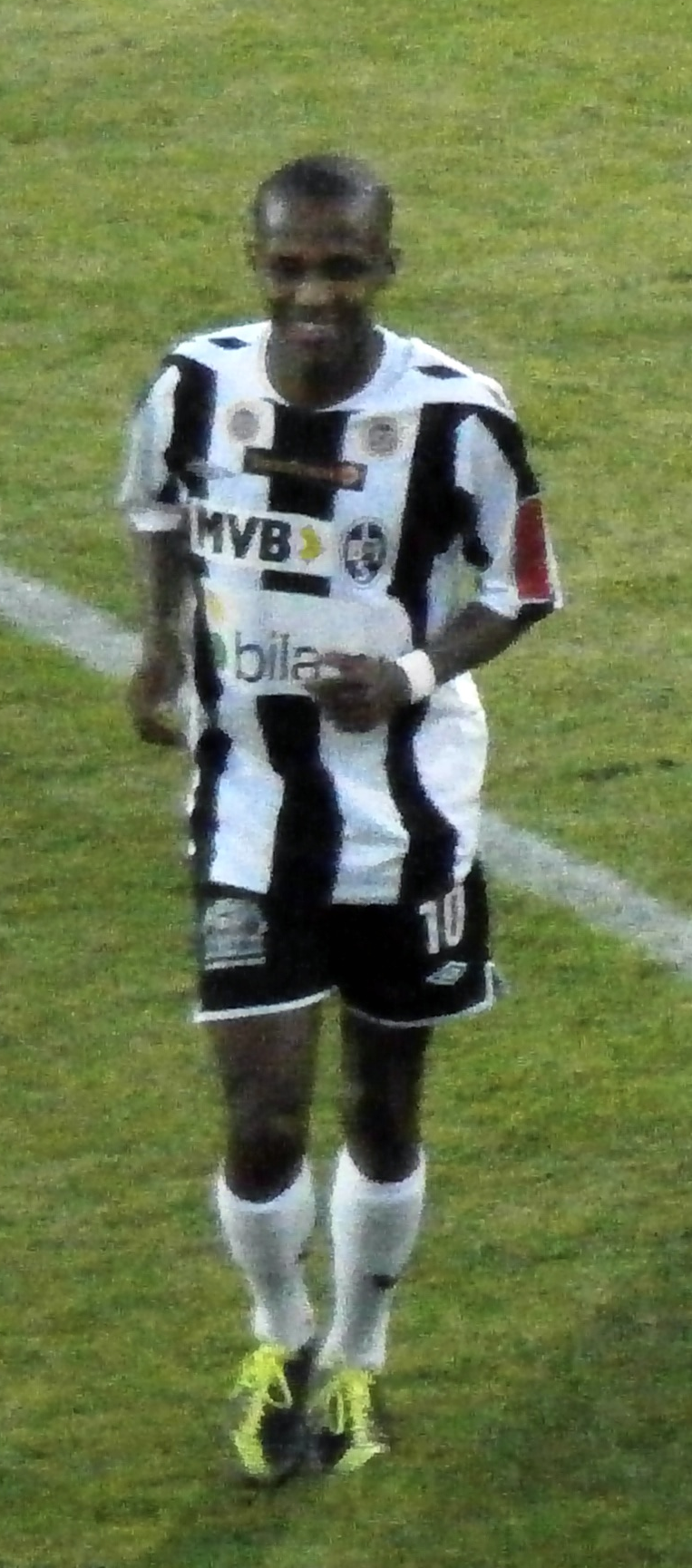
- Bradley Ralani for Landskrona BoIS.

Personal information
- Full name: Amethyst Bradley Ralani
- Date of birth: 4 October 1987 (age 39)
- Place of birth: Kimberley, South Africa
- Height: 1.70 m (5 ft 7 in)
- Position: Winger

Team information
- Current team: Orbit College Football Club

Senior career*
Years	Team	Apps	(Gls)
2009	Helsingborgs IF	0	(0)
2009	→ IFK Hässleholm (loan)	5	(2)
2010–2015	Landskrona BoIS	105	(16)
2015–2016	Lyngby BK	30	(3)
2016–2017	Helsingborgs IF	41	(8)
2018–2022	Cape Town City	104	(14)
2022–2023	Mamelodi Sundowns	18	(3)
2023–2024	Cape Town Spurs	13	(0)
2024–	Hungry Lions	14	(0)
- * Club domestic league appearances and goals as of 25 December 2023

Amethyst Bradley "Surprise" Ralani (born 4 October 1987) is a South African professional soccer player who plays as a winger for South African Premier Division club Orbit College FC.

== Career ==
Playing in the 2016 Allsvenskan, Helsingborgs IF signed him until the conclusion of the current season. He made his debut in July 2016.

Ralani returned to South Africa in January 2018, signing for South African Premier Division club Cape Town City.

In January 2022, Ralani joined fellow Premier Division side Mamelodi Sundowns, signing a one-and-a-half-year contract with an option for a further year.

On 26 October 2023, after his contract with Sundowns had expired, Ralani joined recently promoted to Premier Division club Cape Town Spurs.
