= Craig Martin (South African soccer) =

South African soccer player

Personal information
- Date of birth: 4 August 1993 (age 33)
- Place of birth: Cape Town, South Africa
- Height: 1.80 m (5 ft 11 in)
- Positions: Right-back; right midfielder

Team information
- Current team: Chippa United
- Number: 30

Senior career*
Years	Team	Apps	(Gls)
–2014	Kensington FC		
2014–2016	Hellenic		
2016–2017	Glendene United		
2017–2023	Cape Town City	128	(13)
2023	Orlando Pirates	5	(0)
2023–	Chippa United	23	(5)

International career^{‡}
2021–	South Africa	1	(0)
- * Club domestic league appearances and goals as of 15 June 2024 ‡ National team caps and goals as of 10 June 2021

Craig Martin (born 4 August 1993) is a South African professional soccer player who plays as a right-back or right midfielder for Chippa United.

== Club career ==
Born in Cape Town, Martin grew up in the Kensington suburb of Cape Town. He attended Kensington High School and played for Kensington FC. He later spent two seasons with Hellenic and one with Glendene United before signing for Cape Town City in summer 2017. He made his debut for the club on 22 September 2017 as a 68th-minute substitute for Ayanda Patosi in a 1–0 win over Polokwane City. He made his first start the following week in a 2–0 win away to Ajax Cape Town. He scored the first goal of his professional career on 21 November 2017 in a 1–1 draw with Baroka. On 20 January 2018, he scored the only goal of the game as Cape Town City beat rivals Ajax Cape Town for the second time that season. He scored 3 goals in 22 league appearances in his first season at the club.

In late 2020, it was reported that Orlando Pirates were interested in signing Martin, leading Cape Town City owner John Comitis to state that he valued the player at R 45,000,000. In January 2021, it was confirmed that Martin had contracted COVID-19. Later that month, he signed a three-year contract extension with the club, ending speculation of a possible transfer to Orlando Pirates.

== International career ==
Martin was called up to the South Africa national soccer team for the first time in March 2021 for 2021 Africa Cup of Nations qualification matches against Ghana and Sudan.

He made his debut on 10 June 2021 in a friendly against Uganda.

== Style of play ==
Martin can play as a right-back or as a right midfielder.
