= Wedson Nyirenda =

Zambian footballer and manager (born 1966)

Personal information
- Date of birth: 23 November 1966 (age 59)
- Position: Forward

Managerial career
- Years: Team
- Zesco United
- Zanaco
- Zambia
- Baroka F.C.
- Lusaka Dynamos
- Nyasa Big Bullets FC, Malawi (2026)

Wedson Nyirenda (born 23 November 1966) is a Zambian football manager and former player.

== Playing career ==
Nyirenda played as a forward for Nchanga Rangers and Power Dynamos in the MTN/FAZ Super Division.

In 1993, he played for Kaizer Chiefs.

Nyirenda scored two goals in Chiefs' win in the 1994 BP Top 8 final.

== Managerial career ==
Nyirenda coached at Zesco United and Zanaco.

Nyirenda was the head coach of the men's senior Zambia national team having been appointed permanently in January 2017. He resigned in May 2018.

He was involved in the management of the Zambian Under-20 team that won both the Cosafa Under-20 Championship in South Africa and the African Youth Championship.

He presided over the tail end of Zambia's senior national team's 2018 World Cup qualifying campaign, where they finished second in a group containing traditional heavyweights Nigeria, Algeria, and Cameroon.

He led Zambia at the African Nations Championships (CHAN) finals. Under his management, the team beat Ivory Coast to top their group. In the quarterfinal, they were upset by Sudan but were praised as having played "an attractive style of football".

In April 2018, he was one of 77 applicants for the vacant Cameroon national team job. In May 2018, he became the head coach of Baroka F.C. Later on, he was appointed as the manager of Lusaka Dynamos in July 2020.

He later managed Zanaco, resigning in November 2024 after a poor start to the 2024–25 Zambia Super League season.

In June 2026 he was appointed as the Head Coach for the Malawian Premier League team FCB Nyasa Big Bullets.

== Honours ==
Baroka FC

- Telkom Knockout: 2018
