= Cassius Mailula =

South African soccer player (born 2001)

Personal information
- Full name: Cassius Tumelo Mailula
- Date of birth: 12 June 2001 (age 25)
- Place of birth: Ga-Molepo, South Africa
- Height: 1.66 m (5 ft 5 in)
- Position: Forward

Team information
- Current team: Mamelodi Sundowns F.C.
- Number: 33

Youth career
- 2016–2022: Mamelodi Sundowns

Senior career*
Years	Team	Apps	(Gls)
2022–2023	Mamelodi Sundowns	18	(9)
2023–2026	Toronto FC	5	(0)
2024–2024	→ Toronto FC II (loan)	1	(0)
2024–2025	→ Wydad AC (loan)	27	(5)
2025–2026	→ Kortrijk (loan)	3	(0)
2026–	Mamelodi Sundowns F.C.	8	(2)

International career^{‡}
2023–	South Africa	2	(0)
- * Club domestic league appearances and goals as of 3 July 2026 ‡ National team caps and goals as of 17 June 2023

Cassius Tumelo Mailula (born 12 June 2001) is a South African professional soccer player who plays for the South Africa national team.

== Early life ==
In 2016, he joined the Mamelodi Sundowns Academy, after being scouted at the Mandela Youth Challenge in Soweto, where he was named Player Of The Tournament and won the Golden Boot award.

== Club career ==
Mailula made his senior debut for Mamelodi Sundowns in the South African Premier Division during a 1–0 win against Chippa United in September 2022. He scored his first senior goals on 14 October 2022, in a match against La Passe FC in the CAF Champions League, netting a hat-trick. He scored his first league goals on 25 October, netting a brace against Maritzburg United. Mailula was subsequently named the league's Young Player of the Season for his debut campaign.

In July 2023, Mailula signed with Major League Soccer club Toronto FC, signing through the 2026 season, with an option for 2027. He made his debut on 26 August 2023, in a substitute appearance, against the Columbus Crew. He scored his first goal for the club on 24 April 2024 in a 2024 Canadian Championship match against semi-pro club Simcoe County Rovers FC. In 2024, he spent some time on loan with the second team, Toronto FC II, in MLS Next Pro. In August 2024, he went on loan with Moroccan Botola club Wydad AC through 31 July 2025, with an option for a permanent transfer at the conclusion of the loan, reuniting him with Rhulani Mokwena, who was his coach at Mamelodi Sundowns. He scored his first goal for Wydad on 3 November 2024, netting a late winner in a 1–0 victory over FUS Rabat. In September 2025, he was loaned to Belgian Challenger Pro League club Kortrijk through June 2026, with Kortrijk holding a purchase option. Upon his return from his loan, on 3 July 2026, Mailula agreed to a mutual termination of the remainder of his contract with Toronto FC.

== International career ==
In March 2023, Mailula was called up to the South Africa national team for the first time for 2023 Africa Cup of Nations qualification matches. He made his debut on 24 March 2023 against Liberia.

== Career statistics ==
=== Club ===
As of match played 26 June 2025

Appearances and goals by club, season and competition
Club	Season	League			National cup (Note: Includes Nedbank Cup, Canadian Championship and Moroccan Throne Cup)		League cup (Note: Includes Excellence Cup)		Continental		Other		Total	
Club	Season	Division	Apps	Goals	Apps	Goals	Apps	Goals	Apps	Goal	Apps	Goals	Apps	Goals
Mamelodi Sundowns	2022–23	South African Premier Division	18	9	2	0	—		10 (Note: Appearances in CAF Champions League)	7	2 (Note: Appearances in MTN 8)	0	32	16
Toronto FC	2023	Major League Soccer	3	0	0	0	—		—		0	0	3	0
Toronto FC	2024	Major League Soccer	2	0	3	2	—		—		0	0	5	2
Toronto FC	Total		5	0	3	2	—		—		0	0	8	2
Toronto FC II (loan)	2024	MLS Next Pro	1	0	—		—		—		—		1	0
Wydad AC (loan)	2024–25	Botola Pro	27	5	2	0	4	0	—		3 (Note: Appearances in FIFA Club World Cup)	1	36	6
Career total			51	14	7	2	4	0	10	7	5	1	77	24

== Honours ==
Mamelodi Sundowns

- South African Premiership: 2022–23
- MTN 8: 2026
- FIFA African–Asian–Pacific Cup: 2026

Individual

- South African Premier Division Young Player of the Season: 2022–23
