= Mark Anderson (South African soccer) =

South African soccer player

Personal information
- Date of birth: 29 June 1962 (age 64)
- Place of birth: South Africa
- Position: Goalkeeper

Youth career
- Berea Park
- Arcadia Shepherds

Senior career*
Years	Team	Apps	(Gls)
–1995	Mamelodi Sundowns		
1995–1998	Umtata Bush Bucks		
1998–????	Santos Cape Town		
- Hellenic FC

International career
1992–1997	South Africa	7	(0)
- * Club domestic league appearances and goals

Mark Anderson (born 29 June 1962) is a South African retired football (soccer) goalkeeper who played professionally for Pretoria Callies, Mamelodi Sundowns, Umtata Bush Bucks, Santos Cape Town and Hellenic FC.
