= Grant Kekana =

South African soccer player

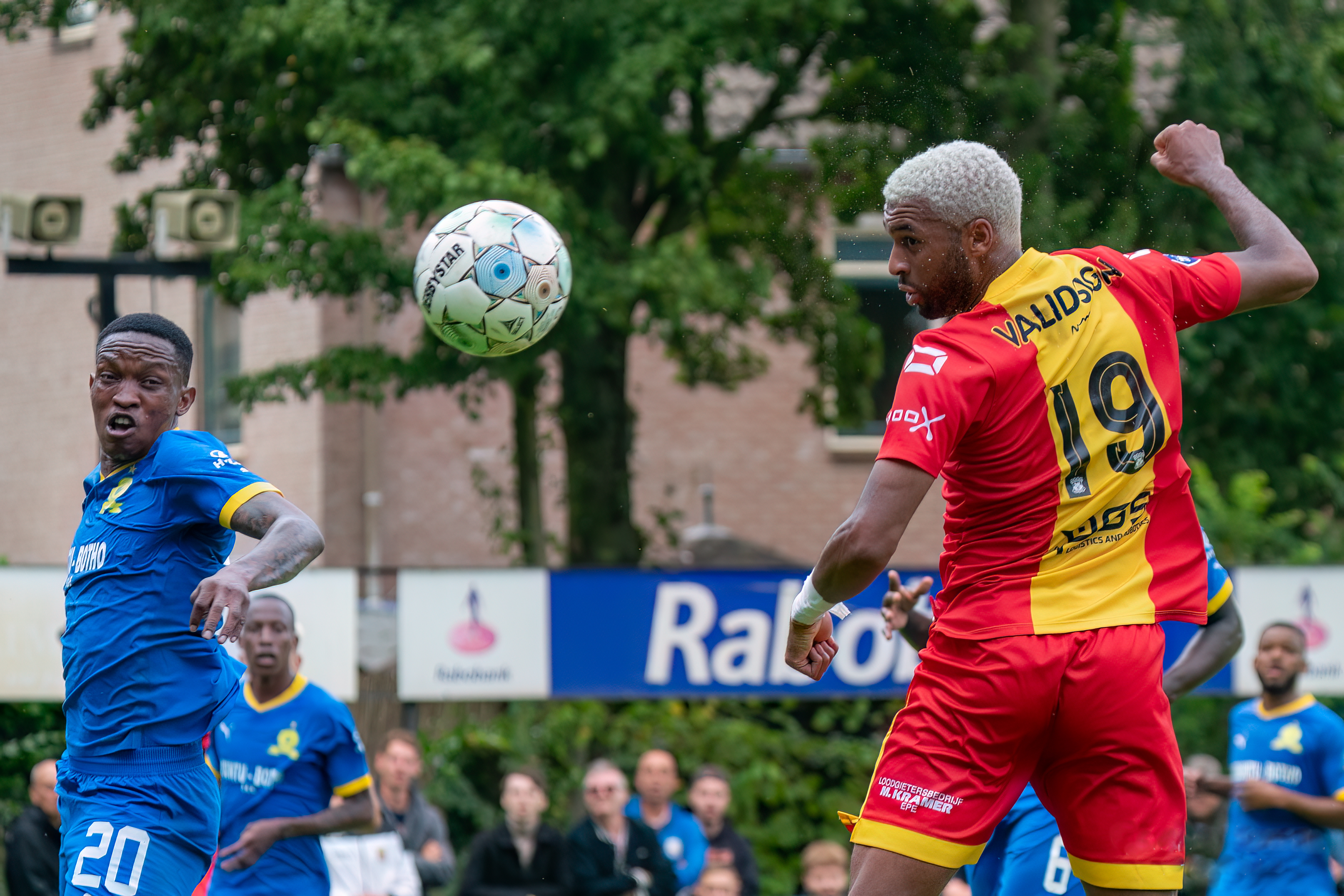
- Kekana (blue shirt, 2023)

Personal information
- Full name: Gomolemo Grant Kekana
- Date of birth: 31 October 1992 (age 34)
- Place of birth: Polokwane, South Africa
- Height: 1.79 m (5 ft 10 in)
- Position: Defender

Team information
- Current team: Mamelodi Sundowns
- Number: 20

Youth career
- University of Pretoria

Senior career*
| Years | Team | Apps | (Gls) |
| –2010 | University of Pretoria | | |
| 2010–2013 | SuperSport United | 32 | (0) |
| 2013–2015 | University of Pretoria | 56 | (3) |
| 2015–2021 | SuperSport United | 96 | (0) |
| 2021– | Mamelodi Sundowns | 84 | (5) |

International career
| 2021– | South Africa | 16 | (0) |
- * Club domestic league appearances and goals as of 3 April 2026

Grant Kekana (born 31 October 1992) is a South African soccer player who plays as a defender for Mamelodi Sundowns in the Premier Soccer League.

== Honours ==
South Africa

- Africa Cup of Nations third place: 2023
- PSL Awards: Defender of the Season 2023/24

Mamelodi Sundowns

- CAF Champions League: 2025–26
- South African Premiership 2021-2022, 2022-2023, 2023-2024, 2024-2025
- MTN 8 2020-2021, 2026-2027
- African–Asian–Pacific Cup 2026
