= Andile Jali =

South African soccer player (born 1990)

Personal information
- Full name: Andile Ernest Jali
- Date of birth: 10 April 1990 (age 36)
- Place of birth: Matatiele, South Africa
- Height: 1.70 m (5 ft 7 in)
- Positions: Defensive midfielder; central midfielder

Youth career
- 2002–2005: Hot Spurs
- 2006–2007: Matatiele Professionals

Senior career*
Years	Team	Apps	(Gls)
2007–2009	Pretoria University	29	(1)
2009–2014	Orlando Pirates	98	(8)
2014–2018	K.V. Oostende	103	(1)
2018–2023	Mamelodi Sundowns	87	(6)
2023–2024	Moroka Swallows	11	(0)
2024–2025	Chippa United	11	(2)

International career^{‡}
2010–2021	South Africa	49	(6)
- * Club domestic league appearances and goals as of 21 June 2026 ‡ National team caps and goals as of 3 October 2024

Andile Ernest Jali (born 10 April 1990) is a South African former professional soccer player who once played for Orlando Pirates, Mamelodi Sundowns and Chippa United. He also played for the South African national team.

== Club career ==
Mhlekazi, as his teammates refer to him, has made a name for himself since moving from the National First Division side Pretoria University to Soweto giants Orlando Pirates.

He joined Orlando Pirates in 2009. He since became the subject of favourable comparisons to Benedict Vilakazi - who wore the number 15 jersey before Jali.

Jali was part of the Orlando Pirates squad that made history in South African football by winning three trophies in one season under Dutch coach Ruud Krol. The same team went on to defend two of their trophies won in the previous year and also win another to make it a back to back treble. Jali has established himself as one of the most important players in the Orlando Pirates squad, winning several trophies at his time at the club. Partly due to his success with the Soweto side, he was touted as the future captain of the South African national team (Bafana Bafana). He has also received acclaim for his performances with some analysts claiming he has the potential to make a name for himself in European football.

In January 2014, Jali signed for Belgian Pro League team K.V. Oostende. During the 2015–16 season, he's second at the club; Jali was impressive, helping guide Oostende to a 5th-place finish in the Belgian Pro League.

In 2023 he moved to Moroka Swallows, but the club faced major internal problems with players leading a strike. Moroka Swallows forfeited two league games. In January 2024, over 20 players were fired, including Jali. Jali lost a legal case against Moroka Swallows.

In 2024 Jali signed for Chippa United

== International career ==
He was a member of the South African squad at the 2009 FIFA U-20 World Cup in Egypt.

He made his debut for South Africa in 2010. In 2010, Jali was named in the preliminary 30-man South African squad for the 2010 FIFA World Cup but missed out on the 23-man squad because of a mild heart condition which ruled him out of the competition.

During 2015, Jali was called up the 2015 African Cup of Nations, playing in South Africa's games against Algeria, Ghana and Senegal in the competition.

=== International goals ===
Scores and results list South Africa's goal tally first.

#	Date	Venue	Opponent	Score	Result	Competition
1.	4 September 2011	Stade Général Seyni Kountché, Niamey, Niger	Niger	1–2	1–2	2012 African Cup of Nations qualification
2.	8 October 2015	Estadio Edgardo Baltodano Briceño, Liberia, Costa Rica	Costa Rica	1–0	1–0	Friendly
3.	13 November 2015	Estádio Nacional de Ombaka, Benguela, Angola	Angola	3–1	3–1	2018 FIFA World Cup qualification
4.	25 March 2017	Moses Mabhida Stadium, Durban, South Africa	Guinea-Bissau	3–1	3–1	Friendly
5.	5 September 2017	Moses Mabhida Stadium, Durban, South Africa	Cape Verde	1–2	1–2	2018 FIFA World Cup qualification

== Honours ==
Orlando Pirates

- Premier Soccer League
  - 2010-11, 2011–12
- Nedbank Cup
  - 2011
- Telkom Knockout
  - 2011
- MTN 8
  - 2010, 2011
- CAF Champions League
  - Runner-up: 2013
- Carling Black Label
  - 2011, 2012

Mamelodi Sundowns

- Premier Soccer League
  - 2018-2019
  - 2019-2020
  - 2020-2021
  - 2021-2022
- Nedbank Cup
  - 2020
  - 2022
- Telkom Knockout
  - 2019
- MTN 8
  - 2021
- CAF Champions League
  - Quarter-Finalist x2

=== Individual ===
- Nedbank Cup Player of the Tournament in Premier Soccer League: 2011

PSL player of the season, Premier soccer League winner 2019 /2020 season with Sundowns. Nedbank cup 2020 with Sundowns.
