= Haashim Domingo =

South African rugby player

Personal information
- Date of birth: 13 August 1995 (age 31)
- Place of birth: Cape Town, South Africa
- Height: 1.72 m (5 ft 7 1/2 in)
- Position: Midfielder

Team information
- Current team: Durban City
- Number: 7

Youth career
- 2013–2015: Ajax Cape Town

Senior career*
| Years | Team | Apps | (Gls) |
| 2015–2018 | Vitória Guimarães B | 71 | (9) |
| 2016 | → Pevidém SC (loan) | | |
| 2016 | → Raufoss (loan) | 8 | (0) |
| 2018–2020 | Bidvest Wits | 39 | (3) |
| 2020–2022 | Mamelodi Sundowns | 42 | (4) |
| 2023–2024 | Raja CA | 10 | (0) |
| 2024–2025 | Cape Town City | 27 | (1) |
| 2025– | Durban City | 15 | (2) |

International career
| 2015 | South Africa under-20 | 8 | (1) |
- * Club domestic league appearances and goals as of 4 January 2026

Haashim Domingo (born 13 August 1995) is a South African professional soccer player who plays as a midfielder for Durban City.

== Club career ==
He made his professional debut in the Segunda Liga for Vitória Guimarães B on 14 February 2015 in a game against Atlético CP and scored a goal on his debut.

He signed for South African Premier Division side Mamelodi Sundowns on a five-year deal in September 2020.
