= Thapelo Morena =

South African soccer player

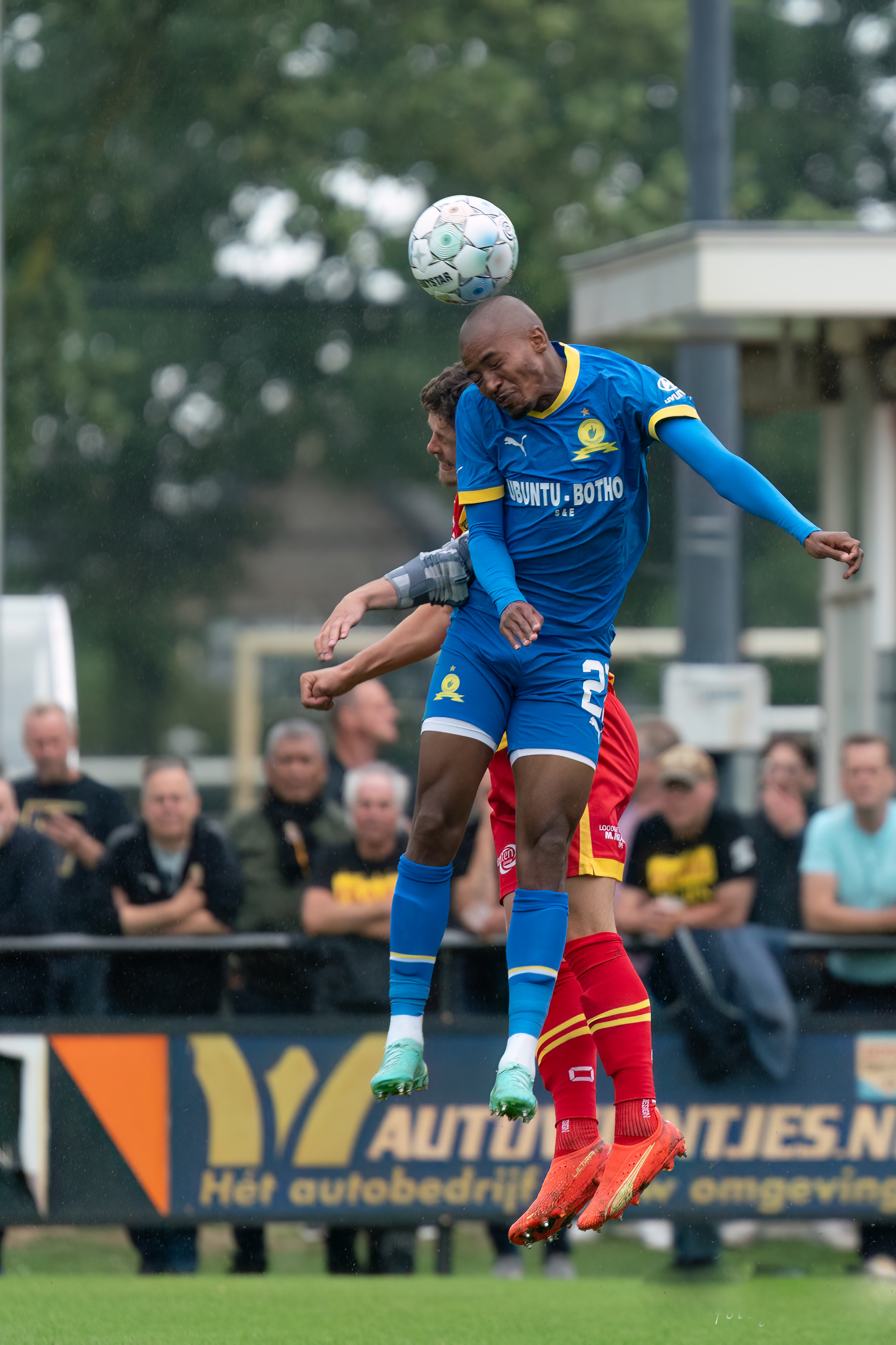
- Morena with Mamelodi Sundowns in 2023

Personal information
- Full name: Thapelo James Morena
- Date of birth: 6 August 1993 (age 33)
- Place of birth: Randfontein, South Africa
- Height: 1.70 m (5 ft 7 in)
- Positions: Defender; midfielder

Team information
- Current team: Mamelodi Sundowns
- Number: 27

Youth career
- 2011–2013: Bloemfontein Celtic

Senior career*
| Years | Team | Apps | (Gls) |
| 2013–2016 | Bloemfontein Celtic | 50 | (7) |
| 2016– | Mamelodi Sundowns | 195 | (10) |

International career^{‡}
| 2016 | South Africa U23 | 2 | (0) |
| 2015– | South Africa | 34 | (3) |
- * Club domestic league appearances and goals as of 3 January 2026 ‡ National team caps and goals as of 15 November 2024

Thapelo James Morena (born 6 August 1993) is a South African professional soccer player who plays as a defender or midfielder for South African club Mamelodi Sundowns and the South Africa national team.

== Career statistics ==
=== International ===
As of match played 14 October 2025

Appearances and goals by national team and year
| National team | Year | Apps | Goals |
|---|---|---|---|
| South Africa | 2015 | 6 | 0 |
| South Africa | 2019 | 3 | 0 |
| South Africa | 2020 | 2 | 0 |
| South Africa | 2021 | 4 | 0 |
| South Africa | 2023 | 3 | 0 |
| South Africa | 2024 | 16 | 3 |
| South Africa | 2025 | 4 | 0 |
| Total | | 39 | 3 |

Scores and results list South Africa's goal tally first, score column indicates score after each Morena goal.

List of international goals scored by Thapelo Morena
| No. | Date | Venue | Opponent | Score | Result | Competition | Ref. |
|---|---|---|---|---|---|---|---|
| 1 | 11 June 2024 | Free State Stadium, Bloemfontein, South Africa | Zimbabwe | 2–1 | 3–1 | 2026 FIFA World Cup qualification | |
| 2 | 11 June 2024 | Free State Stadium, Bloemfontein, South Africa | Zimbabwe | 3–1 | 3–1 | 2026 FIFA World Cup qualification | |
| 3 | 15 November 2024 | Mandela National Stadium, Kira Town, Uganda | Uganda | 1–0 | 2–0 | 2025 Africa Cup of Nations qualification | |

== Honours ==
Mamelodi Sundowns

- South African Premier Division: 2017–18, 2018–19, 2019–20, 2020–21, 2021–22, 2022-23, 2023-24, 2024-25
- Nedbank Cup: 2019–20, 2021-22
- Telkom Knockout: 2019
- MTN 8: 2021, 2026
- Africa Football League: 2023
- CAF Champions League: 2026

South Africa

- Africa Cup of Nations third place: 2023
