= Makhehleni Makhaula =

South African soccer player (born 1989)

Personal information
- Date of birth: 17 November 1989 (age 36)
- Place of birth: Mount Frere, South Africa
- Height: 1.75 m (5 ft 9 in)
- Position: Midfielder

Team information
- Current team: Orlando Pirates
- Number: 8

Senior career*
Years	Team	Apps	(Gls)
–2014	Trabzon		
2014–2019	Free State Stars	81	(3)
2019–2020	Highlands Park	6	(0)
2020–2023	AmaZulu	65	(0)
2023–	Orlando Pirates	59	(1)
- * Club domestic league appearances and goals as of 11 November 2026

Makhehleni Makhaula (born 17 November 1989) is a South African professional soccer player who plays as a midfielder for South African Premier Division club Orlando Pirates.

Makhaula began his career with Trabzon in the SAFA Second Division. He has also played for Free State Stars and Highlands Park.

Makhaula was the captain at AmaZulu before he transferred to Orlando Pirates in January 2023.
