= Sphelele Mkhulise =

South African soccer player

Personal information
- Date of birth: 19 February 1996 (age 30)
- Place of birth: Pietermaritzburg, South Africa
- Positions: Midfielder; winger

Team information
- Current team: Mamelodi Sundowns
- Number: 21

Youth career
- Mamelodi Sundowns

Senior career*
Years	Team	Apps	(Gls)
2016–	Mamelodi Sundowns	110	(6)
2016–2017	→ Mamelodi Sundowns Res (loan)	29	(3)
2017–2018	→ Richards Bay (loan)	25	(3)

International career^{‡}
2021–	South Africa	6	(2)
- * Club domestic league appearances and goals as of 3 January 2026 ‡ National team caps and goals as of 18 July 2021

Sphelele Mkhulise (born 19 February 1996) is a South African professional soccer player who plays as a midfielder or winger for Mamelodi Sundowns.

== Club career ==
Mkhulise started his career with Mamelodi Sundowns, South Africa's most successful club.

In 2016, he was sent on loan to Black Leopards in the South African second division.

In 2021, Mkhulise received interest from French Ligue 1 side Monaco.

== International career ==
Mkhulise made his debut for South Africa national team on 10 June 2021 in a friendly against Uganda. He then represented his country at the 2021 COSAFA Cup, which South Africa won, scoring two goals in the group stage.

== Honours ==
- CAF Champions League: 2026
