= Mamelodi Sundowns F.C. =

Association football club in South Africa

Mamelodi Sundowns
- Full name: Mamelodi Sundowns Football Club
- Nicknames: Bafana ba Style (The Stylish Guys); Masandawana; The Brazilians
- Short name: Sundowns; SUN; MSFC
- Founded: 1970; 56 years ago
- Ground: Loftus Versfeld Stadium
- Capacity: 51,762
- Owner: Patrice Motsepe
- Chairman: Tlhopie Motsepe
- Head coach: Miguel Cardoso
- League: South African Premiership
- 2025–26: South African Premiership, 2nd of 16
- Website: sundownsfc.co.za
Home colours	Away colours	Third colours

Mamelodi Sundowns Football Club (simply known as the Sundowns) is a South African professional football club based in Mamelodi, Pretoria, Gauteng that plays in the Premiership, the first tier of South African football league system. Founded in the 1970s, they play their home games in the Loftus Versfeld Stadium. Sundowns are regarded as one of the most successful clubs in African football.

As of 2026, Sundowns are the most successful football club in the South African Premiership with 15 league titles, amounting to a record 18 in total. Domestically, they have also won the Nedbank Cup six times, the Telkom Knockout four times and the MTN 8 four times.

They won the 2016 CAF Champions League, 2017 CAF Super Cup and were voted the 2016 CAF Club of the Year. They are the first South African team to compete in the FIFA Club World Cup, where they finished in 6th place. In 2021, Sundowns became the first club in Africa to win both CAF Champions League and CAF Women's Champions League titles. In 2023, Sundowns was crowned champions of the inaugural African Football League. In 2026, Sundowns won their second CAF Champions League.

Sundowns is owned by South African business magnate Patrice Motsepe and is one of the most valuable clubs in Africa, with a market value of €29 million as of the 2023-24 season. The club takes pride in its unique style of attacking play, locally dubbed "Shoe Shine & Piano" which includes combinations of quick, short passes on the ground and this is likened to the Spanish Tiki-taka and Total Football. Over the years, this style of play has been reflected in its youth teams and women's football team.

== History ==
=== 1964–1970: Beginnings ===
Sundowns Football Club originated around Marabastad, a cosmopolitan area north west of the Pretoria CBD in the early sixties, where it was formed by a group of youngsters residing in the area. The club mentions individuals such as Frank "ABC" Motsepe, Roy Fischer, Ingle Singh and Bernard Hartze and as part of its founding young stars. The newly established team was named Marabastad Sundowns after an amateur club called Sundowns, which existed in the 1940s, also formed in Marabastad.

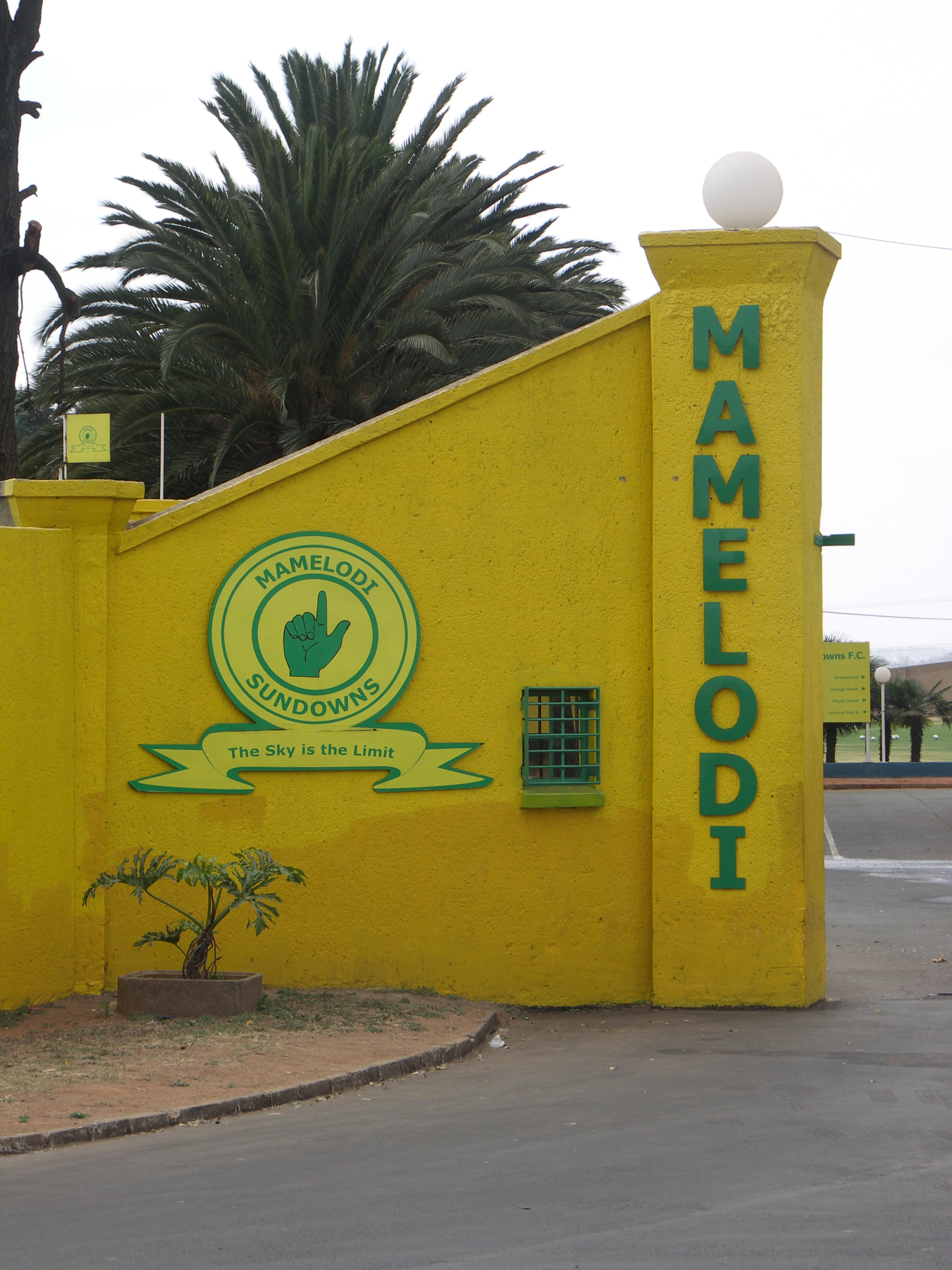
Headquarters of Mamelodi Sundowns FC in Chloorkop in Pretoria.

In 1969, Ingle "Jinx" Singh, one of the founding players for Sundowns and later owner of both Marabastad Sundowns and Pretoria City (which later became SuperSport United F.C.), decided to sell the club to Dr. Bonny Sebotsane, Dr. Motsiri Itsweng. The club was moved to the nearby township of Mamelodi and was officially established and renamed as Mamelodi Sundowns in 1970.

=== 1970–1988: Zola Mahobe, Stan Tshabalala and the "Mr Cool" Years ===
The club was affiliated with the Federation Professional Football League in 1973 and in the same year reached the finals of the Coca-Cola Cup, where they played against Berea United and lost 5–3.

In 1978, Sundowns joined the National Professional Soccer League after the merger of the National Football League and the previous iteration of the National Professional Soccer League. This meant Sundowns played in the second division of the new league. For five years 'Downs battled to gain promotion and managed to earn its place in the NPSL in 1983, but in their first season in top-flight football, they found the going difficult. During that period, Sundowns' management resolved to disband the club, until new owner Zola Mahobe came on board in 1985.

In the same year, 1985, South African football was the first sport in the country to become non-racial and the National Soccer League was formed, incorporating the top clubs in the country, including Sundowns. Dave Barber was in charge at the start of the new National Soccer League era but his tenure came to a swift end after the club found itself at the foot of the table and Zola Mahobe appointed Walter da Silver. Da Silver later quit after 5 games before the end of the season, claiming that Mahobe was interfering in team selection.

Zola Mahobe appointed Ben Segale as the coach, and the team ended the 1985 season in a flourish by winning the last 4 games to finish 11th place, which was a big improvement on their previous two top flight seasons. Under Mahobe, Sundowns fortunes changed for the better as they began to challenge for top honours in the domestic league. The big spending Sundowns boss recruited the services of elite South African footballers on a quest for supremacy, and changed their kit to resemble that of the Brazilian national team, earning them their nickname, "the Brazilians".

Mahobe went to Soweto to acquire the services of the coach Stanley "Screamer" Tshabalala, who was assisting Blackpool at the time, to lead the Sundowns team. Under the tutelage of Screamer Tshabalala, Sundowns played an entertaining and effective brand of football which became known as "The Shoe Shine and Piano." By the end of 1986, the club had won the Mainstay cup in a 1-0 victory against Jomo Cosmos in Ellis Park and goalkeeper, Mark Anderson was voted Footballer of the Year as new players kept arriving. The next season, they finished third in the league, just three points behind champions Jomo Cosmos.

Sundowns were flying in 1988, with a victory against cross-town rivals Arcadia in the final of BP Top Eight Cup, and then later beating them again for the Ohlsson's Challenge Cup. Despite winning two trophies that year, trouble was brewing in the camp when players, led by Anderson demanded the resignation of coach Tshabalala and his assistant Trot Moloto. Stan resigned from his position, with a record of 54 wins, 29 draws and 25 losses. Captain, Mike Ntombela took charge over the club for four games while the management looked for a coach.

In the same year, the ownership of the club fell into the hands of Standard Bank, which repossessed the club from Zola Mahobe after his conviction for fraud. The club went into liquidation and the football family Angelo and Natasha Tsichlas spoke to the bank and saved the club. They then formed a company with Krok brothers and bought 100% of the club.

=== 1988–1995: Tsichlas/Krok leadership and First Championship ===
Chilean coach, Mario Tuane and his assistant Angelo Tsichlas took charge of a club at the top of the table and led it to its first league championship. There were rapturous celebrations at HM Pitje Stadium after Sundowns gained an unassailable point lead over Cosmos. However, the club could not defend the Ohlsson's challenge and BP Top Eight crowns and the Tuane era came to an end, with Angelo Tsichlas taking charge of the team as a caretaker coach until the club appointed Trott Moloto, and shortly after Stan Lapot. In the '89 season, Sundowns went on a 7-game unbeaten run in the league, but could only win one of their last 6 matches in the league, which ended the club's season at position 5.

This prompted the return of Stan Tshabalala, who took the team to the top of the table again in 1990. Sundowns only lost 2 league games during the campaign and won its first treble, managing to win the Top Eight Cup and the JPS Knockout Cup against Orlando Pirates with a 2–1 scoreline in the final.

This success was followed by a season of heartbreaking losses in 1991, with the team finishing second place in the league and failing to get into any cup final. 1992 was similar under Augusto Palacios, when Sundowns lost both the Top Eight cup and Castle Challenge to rivals Kaizer Chiefs and Orlando Pirates respectively, finishing 6th in the league.

Jeff Butler was appointed as the coach in 1993 after being turfed in a dispute with Bafana Bafana. He led the club to a 3rd league title win in a close 3 point race against Moroka Swallows and a 4th place league finish in the following year. Sundowns qualified for a continental title for the first time in the 1994 African Cup of Champions Clubs but lost to AS Vita Club in the second round.

=== 1995–2004: Premier Soccer League and the Ted Dimitru era ===
The National Soccer League was replaced by the Premiership, administered by the Premier Soccer League, for the 1996–97 season. After a flurry of coaches and players came, went, and a third Stan Tshabalala stint in unsuccessful '96 and '97 campaigns, Sundowns signed Raphael Chukwu from Nigerian club, Shooting Stars S.C. and appointed Ted Dumitru as head coach in July 1997. Raphael's partnership with Daniel Mudau proved to be prolific in front of posts. Backed up by a super team of standout players such as Joel Masilela, Alex Bapela, Isaac Shai, Roger Feutmba and goalkeeper John Tlale amongst others, Sundowns went on to win three consecutive league titles from 1998 to 2000 as well as being Bob Save Super Bowl winners in 1998 and Rothmans Cup winners in 1999.

In 2001, Sundowns focused their efforts on continental glory and became only the second South African team to reach the prestigious CAF Champions League Final when they defeated Petro Atlético in the semifinals. The club played the 2001 CAF Champions League Final where they were defeated 4–1 on aggregate by Egyptian club Al Ahly.

The club underwent a period of rebuilding after the 1999/2000 season, enduring a period of bad performances in league and cup matches. Sundowns finished 3rd in the 2001/02 season, 10th in the 2002/03 season, 5th in the 2003/04 season and again 3rd in the 2004/05 season.

=== 2004–present: Patrice Motsepe ownership ===
In 2004, mining magnate Patrice Motsepe bought a 51% share in the club and later took total control of the club by buying the remaining shares, thus becoming the sole owner and shareholder of the club. Under their new owner, Sundowns picked up their first piece of silverware for six years in May 2006 when co-coaches Miguel Gamondi and Neil Tovey oversaw Sundowns' triumph in the PSL, the seventh league title in their history.

After a slow start to the 2006–07 season, Gamondi and Tovey were relieved of their positions, and Gordon Igesund took over as head coach. Under Igesund, Sundowns defended their title in emphatic style, running away with the trophy. They failed to win the 'double', losing to Ajax Cape Town in the 2007 ABSA Cup final.

In 2009 the club hired former Ballon d'Or winner Hristo Stoichkov as their coach. A stuttering start to the 2009–10 season saw an impressive run through the second half of the season which propelled the club to second position in the final league standings. The club nevertheless parted ways with their coach after one season.

In the 2010–11 season, Antonio Lopez Habas, who was the assistant coach under Stoichkov, took over the reins of the senior team. Sundowns made its best ever start to a League season and topped the league standings at the end of the first round. The second round of the league proved more competitive and Sundowns were in the hunt for the league title until the second last match. Habas resigned in February, citing personal reasons and went back to Spain. Assistant coach Ian Gorowa was appointed as interim head coach.

In 2011, highly rated Dutch tactician Johan Neeskens was appointed as the coach of Sundowns in a bid to awaken the sleeping giant that hadn't won silverware since winning the 2008 Nedbank cup. The Dutch-born coach gave a number of young players from the development team opportunities to impress in the senior team. Even though the Dutch mentor made the team play free-flowing and an entertaining brand of football, his failure to capture silverware led to his demise. On 4 March 2012, under the leadership of Neeskens, the team set a remarkable South African record in the Nedbank Cup when they beat Powerlines by a score of 24–0. The club went on to lose the 2012 Nedbank Cup final 2–1 to Tshwane rivals Supersport United. His coaching stint at Chloorkop was short-lived as the impatient and demanding Sundowns supporters exerted pressure to the management to sack him. When the team failed to win the 2012 Telkom Knockout final against Bloemfontein Celtic, Neeskens was sacked as head coach of the Tshwane-based side with the team languishing in the relegation zone.

=== 2012–2020: The Pitso Mosimane Era ===
On 2 December 2012, Pitso Mosimane took over as head coach and guided a turbulent Sundowns season to 9th place in the league. The 2013/14 season began on a better note, with a 6-game unbeaten streak including a 7-1 thumping of AmaZulu at home. However, in the mid-season, team performances became inconsistent and Sundowns found itself 11 points behind log leaders Kaizer Chiefs. There was still positivity in the camp however, and Mosimane was confident about a good end to the season. On 9 March 2014, Sundowns began an 11-game unbeaten streak that would end in an emphatic league title win after a 6-year trophy drought.

The acquisition of Khama Billiat in August 2013, Keagan Dolly and Leonardo Castro in the 2014/15 season bolstered the Sundowns attacking order that was backed by Hlompho Kekana, Samuel Mabunda, Themba Zwane, Teko Modise and academy wonder Percy Tau. The team finished 2nd in the league in the 2014 season, but won both the Nedbank Cup and Telkom Knockout. This would begin an era dominance in the league and Sundowns won the 2015/2016, 2017/2018, 2018/2019 and 2019/2020 league titles on the trot. 2015/16 was a record breaking season, which saw Sundowns become the first team to break the 70 point ceiling in the league since the South African top flight league became a 16-team league system.

In 2017, Mosimane oversaw Sundowns' first CAF Champions League win, which was the goal of owner Patrice Motsepe when he bought the club in 2004. Sundowns were eliminated in the preliminary rounds of the 2016 CAF Champions League, but were placed back in the competition after Congolese team Vita Club were disqualified from the competition for fielding a suspended player. In their journey for gold, Sundowns opened their campaign with an annulled 2–0 win against Algeria's ES Setif courtesy of Mabunda and Khama Billiat goals.

==== 2016 CAF Champions Win and 2017 Super Cup win ====
Mamelodi Sundowns advanced through the 2016 CAF Champions League group stage with a series of strong performances. They opened their campaign with a 2–1 victory over Enyimba International at Lucas Moripe Stadium. Sundowns then travelled to Egypt, where they defeated Zamalek 2–1, before securing another win in the second leg with a 1–0 result following an own goal. Although already assured of a semifinal place, Sundowns ended the group stage with a 3–1 defeat away to Enyimba, fielding a youthful side on a rain‑soaked pitch.

In the semifinals, Sundowns faced ZESCO United, losing the first leg 2–1 in Ndola after conceding twice in quick succession in the 54th and 56th minute. The second leg in Pretoria saw Sundowns overturn the deficit with a 2–0 win, sending the club to its first Champions League final since 2001. In the final, Sundowns defeated Zamalek 3–1 on aggregate, securing their first continental title and becoming only the second South African club to win the competition after Orlando Pirates. They followed this success by claiming the 2017 CAF Super Cup, beating TP Mazembe at Loftus Versfeld.

Starting lineup for CAF Champions League 2016 Final, 1st leg

The club strengthened its squad in 2018 with the notable acquisitions of Gaston Sirino from Bolívar and Rivaldo Coetzee, despite the latter joining while recovering from injury. Although Sundowns had lost several key players the previous season, they maintained a high level of domestic competitiveness and went on to secure a domestic treble in the 2018–19 campaign, winning the league, the Telkom Knockout, and the Nedbank Cup.

In September 2020, Pitso Mosimane resigned as head coach of Mamelodi Sundowns after a highly successful tenure in which he won five Premier Soccer League titles, the CAF Champions League, the CAF Super Cup, as well as the two FA Cup and League Cup trophies. His departure marked the end of the club’s most decorated managerial spell, as Mosimane left as the most successful coach in Sundowns’ history.

=== 2020–2022: Rhulani Mokwena & Manqoba Mngqithi ===
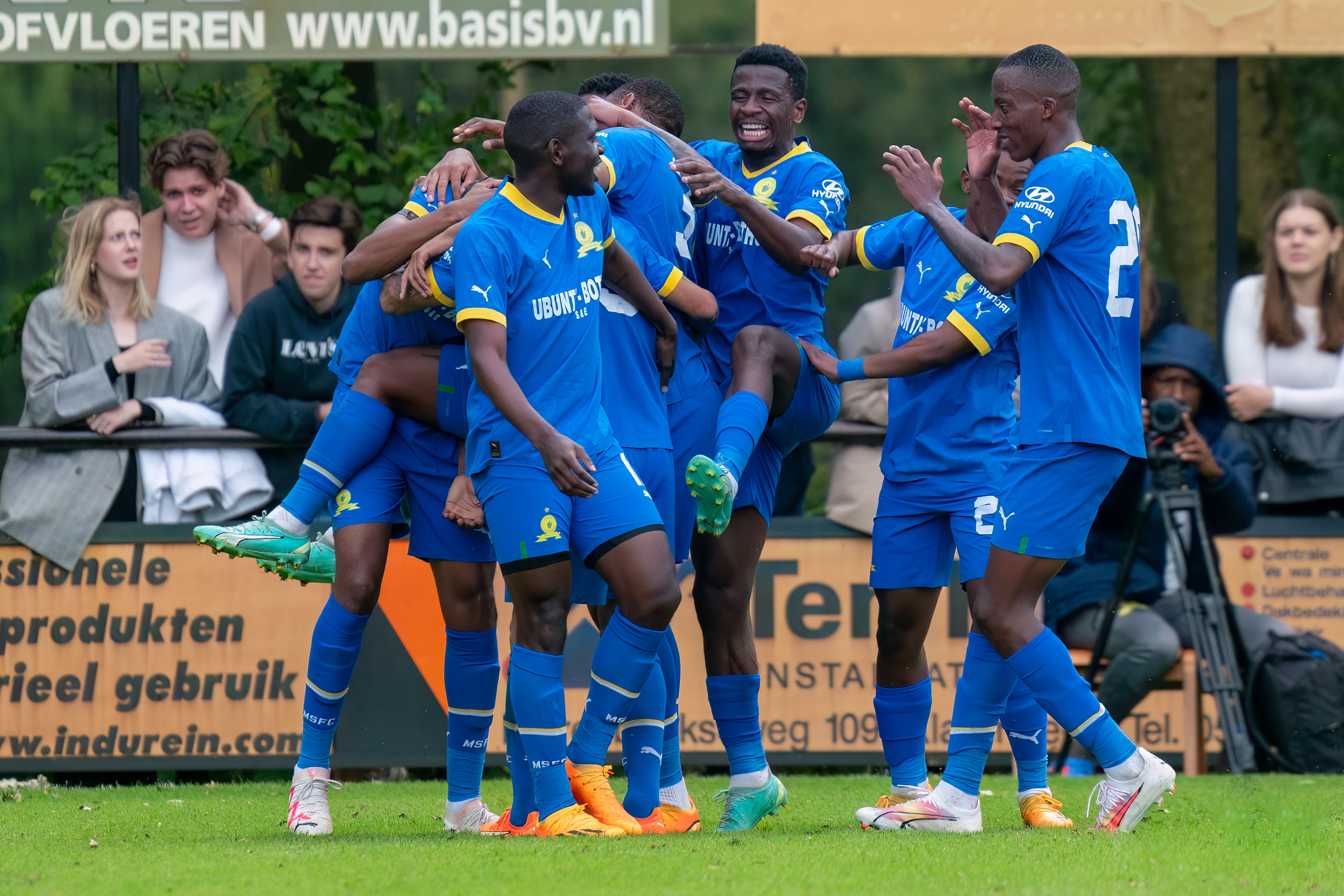
Mamelodi Sundowns FC in a friendly game against Go Ahead Eagles in 2023.

The team underwent changes in coaching personnel for the first time in almost 7 years and an influx of new players after the departure of Pitso Mosimane. The club appointed former assistant coaches, Rhulani Mokwena and Manqoba Mngqithi as joint head coaches with the opinion of Manqoba Mngithi prevailing when there isn't consensus. The club's board was keen on appointing South African coaches, and later appointed Steve Komphela as a senior coach to assist the coaching pair. The trio saw off a season which saw the rise of new top scoring marksman, Peter Shalulile and standout signings such as Neo Maema, Rushine De Reuck amongst many others. The duo guided Mamelodi Sundowns to a fourth consecutive league title and secured the club’s third domestic treble in the 2021–22 season, winning the league, Nedbank Cup, and MTN 8 to add to their achievements during their tenure.

=== 2022–2024: The Rhulani Mokwena Era ===
After being elevated from joint head coach to sole head coach in October 2022, Mokwena refined the club’s identity around structured possession, high‑intensity pressing and fluid positional rotations. His tenure produced domestic consistency, including record unbeaten runs, the fewest goals conceded in a PSL season (10 goals in 2023–24), most points accumulated in a 30‑game PSL campaign (73 points in 2023–24) and league campaigns where Sundowns finished double digits ahead of their closest challengers.

Key players such as Peter Shalulile, Teboho Mokoena, captain Themba Zwane and Marcelo Allende flourished under his system, while the club continued integrating younger talents into a stable, high‑performance environment.

On the continental stage, Sundowns under Mokwena produced two semi-finalist performances in the CAF Champions League and won the inugural African Football League.

=== 2024–present: The Miguel Cardoso Era ===
In December 2024, Mamelodi Sundowns appointed Portuguese coach Miguel Cardoso as head coach following the departure of Manqoba Mngqithi, who had led the team after Rhulani Mokwena’s exit in May 2024. Steve Komphela, who returned to his role as senior coach in July 2024, served as Cardoso’s first assistant coach. Under the new technical leadership, Sundowns equalled the 73‑point record for the most points accumulated in a 30‑match PSL season and finished as runners‑up in the CAF Champions League, reaching their first final since their 2016 triumph.

==== 2025–26 CAF Champions League win ====
Mamelodi Sundowns delivered one of their strongest continental campaigns in the 2025–26 CAF Champions League, ultimately winning the tournament for the second time in their history. They advanced from Group C after finishing second with nine points, backed by a balanced return of nine goals scored and six conceded. Their group-stage form included key results against MC Alger and Saint-Éloi Lupopo. Sundowns’ statistical profile across the competition was elite: they ranked first in shots on target (38), first in clean sheets (6), and first in passing accuracy (85%), highlighting their dominance in possession and chance conversion.

In the knockout rounds, Sundowns defeated Stade Malien 3–2 on aggregate in the quarter-finals before advancing past Espérance de Tunis in the semi-finals. Their tactical resilience was tested by red cards in both rounds, yet the squad’s depth and structure allowed them to maintain momentum. The final against AS FAR showcased their maturity and control: a 1–0 home win in Pretoria followed by a disciplined 1–1 draw in Rabat secured a 2–1 aggregate victory and the continental crown. This triumph marked a significant milestone for coach Miguel Cardoso, who claimed his first CAF Champions League title after two previous final defeats, and reaffirmed Sundowns’ status as one of Africa’s most consistent and dominant football clubs.

The club entered the 2026–27 season as the top‑ranked team in the CAF five‑year ranking for the first time in its history.

==== FIFA African–Asian–Pacific Cup ====
Sundowns produced a standout performance in the 2026 FIFA Intercontinental Cup, defeating Asian champions Al Ahli 2–1 to secure the African–Asian–Pacific title and progress to the tournament’s Challenger Cup. A brace from Nuno Santos proved decisive at Loftus Versfeld. Head coach Miguel Cardoso’s selection strategy was instrumental, including the debut of Thabang Matuludi, whose assist for the winning goal played a crucial role in the victory.

== Honours ==
Type	Competition	Titles	Seasons
Domestic	Premiership / National Soccer League	18	Winners (18): 1988, 1989–90, 1992–93, 1997–98, 1998–99, 1999–2000, 2005–06, 2006–07, 2013–14, 2015–16, 2017–18, 2018–19, 2019–20, 2020–21, 2021–22, 2022–23, 2023–24, 2024–25 Runners-up (6): 1990–91, 1994–95, 2009–10, 2014–15, 2016–17, 2025–26
Domestic	FA Cup	6	Winners (6): 1986, 1998, 2008, 2014–15, 2019–20, 2021–22 Runners-up (6): 1989, 2000, 2001, 2007, 2011–12, 2023–24
Domestic	League Cup	4	Winners (4): 1990, 1999, 2015, 2019 Runners-up (5): 1997, 1998, 2007, 2012, 2024
Domestic	Top 8 Cup	5	Winners (5): 1988, 1990, 2007, 2021, 2026 Runners-up (7): 1992, 1994, 2001, 2002, 2008, 2016, 2023
Continental	CAF Champions League	2	Winners (2): 2016, 2025–26 Runners-up (2): 2001, 2024–25
Continental	CAF Super Cup	1	Winners (1): 2017 Runners-up (1): 2026
Continental	African Football League	1	Winners (1): 2023
Intercontinental	FIFA African–Asian–Pacific Cup	1^{S}	Winners (1): 2026

- Record
- ^{S} Shared record

=== Awards ===
- African Club of the Year: 2016
- South African team of the year: 2016
- PSL team of the season: 2013–14, 2015–16,

=== Friendly cup competitions ===
- Shell Helix Cup: 2018
- Telkom Charity Cup: 1991, 2000, 2004, 2005, 2006
- Carling Black Label Cup: 2022
- Ohlsson's Challenge Cup: 1988
- Red Bull Diski Last Namba: 2026

== Performance in CAF Competitions ==
NB: South African football clubs started participating in CAF Competitions in 1993, after 16 years of being banned from FIFA due to the apartheid system. The ban extended from 1976 to 1992.

- African Cup of Champions Clubs / CAF Champions League: 20 appearances

The club has 1 appearance in African Cup of Champions Clubs 1994 and 19 appearances in CAF Champions League from 1999 until now. It has also recorded the biggest victory in the CAF Champions League by defeating Seychelles side Côte d'Or, 11–1 at home and 16–1 on aggregate in the first round of the 2019–2020 season.

Year	Best finish
1994	Second round
1999	Play-offs
2000	Group stage
2001	Runners-up
2006	First round
2007	Play-offs
2008	Play-offs
2015	First round
2016	Champions
2017	Quarter-finals
2018	Group stage
2018–19	Semi-finals
2019–20	Quarter-finals
2020–21	Quarter-finals
2021–22	Quarter-finals
2022–23	Semi-finals
2023–24	Semi-finals
2024–25	Runners-up
2025–26	Champions
2026–27	Qualifying round

- CAF Confederation Cup: 4 appearances
- CAF Super Cup: 1 appearance

Year	Best finish	
Year	CAF Confederation Cup	CAF Super Cup
2007	Group stage	DNQ
2008	Play-offs	DNQ
2009	Second Round	DNQ
2016	Play-offs	DNQ
2017	DNQ	Champion

- CAF Cup: 2 appearances
- African Cup Winners' Cup: 1 appearance

Year	Best finish	
Year	CAF Cup	African Cup winners' Cup
1996	Second Round	DNQ
1998	DNQ	Second Round
2003	Second Round	DNQ

Note

- DNQ – Did not qualify
- CAF announced on 24 May 2016 that Mamelodi Sundowns won on walkover after AS Vita Club were disqualified for fielding an ineligible player in their preliminary round tie against Mafunzo. Mamelodi Sundowns played in the Confederation Cup play-off round before they were reinstated to the Champions League.

=== Overall matches ===
Competition	P	W	D	L	GF	GA
CAF Cup	8	4	1	3	11	7
African Cup Winners' Cup	4	2	1	1	7	3
CAF Champions League	111	57	28	26	175	96
CAF Confederation Cup	16	7	2	7	25	24
CAF Super Cup	1	1	0	0	1	0
Total	140	71	32	37	219	130

As of 9 March 2020

== Club ranking ==
The club ranking is used for seeding in the CAF Champions League and the CAF Confederation Cup. Pending equality in ranking points, the team receiving more points in the previous season is considered as the higher-ranked team.

The club ranking for the 2025–26 CAF Champions League and the 2025–26 CAF Confederation Cup is be based on results from each CAF club competition from the 2021–22 to the 2025–26 seasons.

Rank	Club	2021–22 (× 1)	2022–23 (× 2)	2023–24 (× 3)	2024–25 (× 4)	2025–26 (× 5)	Total
1	(South Africa) Mamelodi Sundowns	3	4	4	5	6	73
2	(Egypt) Al Ahly	5	6	6	4	3	66
3	(Tunisia) Espérance de Tunis	3	4	5	3	4	58

As of 20 September 2026

== Performance in FIFA Club World Cup ==
- FIFA Club World Cup: 5 appearances

Mamelodi was the first football club from Southern Africa to represent CAF in FIFA Club World Cup, following their 2016 CAF Champions League success. Sundowns participated in the FIFA Club World Cup 2025 tournament in the United States. On 17 June 2025 Sundowns secured their first ever win in the FIFA Club World Cup when they beat South Korea’s Ulsan HD where striker Iqraam Rayners found the back of the net. It was also a first victory for an African side at the tournament in the US after Egypt’s Al Ahly drew their opening match against Inter Miami.

Year	Finish	P	W	D	L	GF	GA	GD	Pst
2016	6th place	2	0	0	2	1	6	-5	0
	Total	2	0	0	2	1	6	-5	0 Mamelodi Sundowns most recent CWC was June 2025 in the USA: - *Group F*: Dortmund, Fluminense, Ulsan HD, Sundowns - *Result vs Ulsan HD 1-0*: Rayners 36’ goal for 3 pts - *Result vs Dortmund 3-4*: Lost a thriller. Ribeiro, Rayners, Matthews, Mothiba scored - *Result vs Fluminense 0-0*: Held the Brazilians in Miami - *Finished 3rd* with 4 pts, missed knockout stage on GD

As of 16 June 2026

== Club records ==
=== Records ===
Type	Nat	Name	Record
Most trophies won – Player	(Zambia)	Kennedy Mweene	12
Most Trophies Won – Coach	(South Africa)	Pitso Mosimane	11
Most starts	(South Africa)	Daniel Mudau	390
Most goals	(South Africa)	Daniel Mudau	172
Most capped player	(South Africa)	Ronwen Williams	50
Most starts in a season	(South Africa)	Themba Mnguni	48 (1997–98)
Most goals in a season	(South Africa)	Bennett Masinga	33 (1990)
Record victory	(South Africa)	vs Powerlines	24–0 (4 March 2012, Nedbank Cup)
Inter-record victory	(Egypt)	vs Al Ahly	5–0 (6 April 2019, CAF Champions League)
Record defeat	(Ivory Coast)	vs Africa Sports	1–6 (4 November 2000, CAF Champions League)

=== Premiership record ===
Season	Pos	Record							
Season	Pos	P	W	D	L	F	A	GD	Pts
1996–97	6th	34	13	11	10	35	30	5	50
1997–98	Champions	34	19	11	4	48	25	23	68
1998–99	Champions	34	23	6	5	70	26	44	75
1999–00	Champions	34	23	6	5	68	34	34	75
2000–01	3rd	34	17	8	9	58	32	26	59
2001–02	5th	34	15	11	8	47	32	15	56
2002–03	10th	30	11	6	13	30	30	0	39
2003–04	10th	30	8	12	10	32	32	0	36
2004–05	3rd	30	16	8	6	54	28	26	56
2005–06	Champions	30	16	9	5	45	19	26	57
2006–07	Champions	30	18	7	5	45	17	28	61
2007–08	4th	30	13	8	9	40	35	5	47
2008–09	9th	30	11	7	12	28	28	0	40
2009–10	2nd	30	16	8	6	43	23	20	56
2010–11	4th	30	18	4	8	52	28	24	58
2011–12	4th	30	14	10	6	44	23	21	52
2012–13	9th	30	9	12	9	31	27	4	39
2013–14	Champions	30	20	5	5	51	25	26	65
2014–15	2nd	30	16	9	5	44	24	20	57
2015–16	Champions	30	22	5	3	55	20	35	71
2016–17	2nd	30	16	9	5	52	20	32	57
2017–18	Champions	30	18	6	6	49	24	25	60
2018–19	Champions	30	16	11	3	40	24	16	59
2019–20	Champions	30	17	8	5	43	22	21	59
2020–21	Champions	30	19	10	1	49	14	35	67
2021–22	Champions	30	19	8	3	56	20	36	65
2022–23	Champions	30	21	7	2	52	13	39	70
2023–24	Champions	30	22	7	1	51	10	41	73
2024–25	Champions	28	24	1	3	65	13	52	73
2025–26	2nd	30	20	8	2	57	21	36	68

- Orange = In progress
- Gold = Champions
- Silver = Runner up

== Players ==
=== Current squad ===
As of 27 September 2026

Note: Flags indicate national team as defined under FIFA eligibility rules; some limited exceptions apply. Players may hold more than one non-FIFA nationality.

No.	Pos.	Nation	Player
1	GK	UGA	Denis Onyango
2	DF	RSA	Malibongwe Khoza
3	DF	RSA	Khulumani Ndamane
4	MF	RSA	Teboho Mokoena
5	DF	ZIM	Divine Lunga
6	DF	RSA	Aubrey Modiba
9	FW	BRA	Arthur Sales
10	MF	POR	Nuno Santos
11	MF	CHI	Marcelo Allende
12	FW	COL	Brayan León
13	FW	RSA	Iqraam Rayners
14	FW	RSA	Monnapule Saleng
15	MF	RSA	Bathusi Aubaas
17	FW	RSA	Tashreeq Matthews
18	MF	RSA	Themba Zwane (captain)
19	MF	RSA	Thabo Cele
20	DF	RSA	Grant Kekana
21	MF	RSA	Sphelele Mkhulise
22	DF	RSA	Thabang Matuludi
23	DF	RSA	Fawaaz Basadien

No.	Pos.	Nation	Player
24	DF	RSA	Keanu Cupido
25	DF	RSA	Khuliso Mudau
26	GK	RSA	Reyaad Pieterse
27	DF	RSA	Thapelo Morena
28	DF	RSA	Zuko Mdunyelwa
29	FW	RSA	Antonio van Wyk
30	GK	RSA	Ronwen Williams (vice-captain)
31	GK	RSA	Ricardo Goss
33	FW	RSA	Cassius Mailula
34	MF	RSA	Tsiki Ntsabeleng
35	FW	RSA	Lebo Mothiba
37	DF	RSA	Kegan Johannes
38	FW	RSA	Siyanda Ndlovu
40	DF	RSA	Mothobi Mvala
43	FW	RSA	Kutlwano Letlhaku
44	MF	RSA	Gomolemo Kekana
45	DF	RSA	Wandile Dube
46	FW	RSA	Bennett Mokoena
47	DF	RSA	Deano van Rooyen

=== Other players under contract ===
Note: Flags indicate national team as defined under FIFA eligibility rules; some limited exceptions apply. Players may hold more than one non-FIFA nationality.

No.	Pos.	Nation	Player
—	MF	ARG	Matías Esquivel
—	FW	RSA	Jody Ah Shene
—	FW	RSA	Siyabonga Mabena

=== Out on loan ===
Note: Flags indicate national team as defined under FIFA eligibility rules; some limited exceptions apply. Players may hold more than one non-FIFA nationality.

No.	Pos.	Nation	Player
—	GK	RSA	Jody February (at Siwelele until 30 June 2027)
—	MF	RSA	Terrence Mashego (at Stellenbosch until 30 June 2027)

No.	Pos.	Nation	Player
—	MF	RSA	Neo Maema (at Simba until 30 June 2027)
—	MF	RSA	Thato Sibiya (at Lille until 30 June 2027)

== Shirt sponsor & kit manufacturer ==
Period	Nat	Shirt sponsor	Sleeve sponsor
1994–1996	(Germany) Puma		
1996–2002	(Germany) Adidas	Disprin	
2002–2008	(Italy) Diadora	MTN	
2008–2016	(United States) Nike	(South Africa) Ubuntu-Botho Investments	
2016–present	(Germany) Puma	(South Africa) Ubuntu-Botho Investments	(South Korea) Hyundai

== See also ==
- Mamelodi Sundowns Diski Team
- Mamelodi Sundowns Ladies FC
- Mamelodi Sundowns Ladies Academy
