= 2020–21 Mamelodi Sundowns F.C. season =

Mamelodi Sundowns
2020–21 season
- Owner: Patrice Motsepe
- Chairman: Thlopie Motsepe
- Manager: Miguel Cardoso steve Khompela
- Stadium: Lucas Moripe Stadium; Loftus Versfeld Stadium
- PSL: Winner
- Nedbank Cup: Semi final
- MTN 8: Quarter final
- CAF Champions League: Quarter final
- Top goalscorer: League: (15 goals); Peter Shalulile; All: (22 goals); Peter Shalulile
- Biggest win: 5–1 v CR Belouizdad; 28 February 2021
Home colours	Away colours

The 2020–21 season is Mamelodi Sundowns's 50th season in existence and 25th consecutive season in the South African Premier Division, the top tier of South African soccer. They will also participate in the Nedbank Cup, the MTN 8 and the CAF Champions League.

== First team squad ==
As of 22 November 2020

Squad no.	Name	Nationality	Position(s)	Date of birth	Signed from	Apps	Goals	Assists
Goalkeeper(s)
1	Kennedy Mweene	Zambia	GK	11 December 1984 (Aged 35)	(South Africa) Free State Stars	101	0	7
14	Denis Onyango	Uganda	GK	15 May 1985 (Aged 35)	(South Africa) Bidvest Wits(on loan)	198	0	0
20	Ricardo Goss	South Africa	GK	2 April 1994 (Aged 26)	(South Africa) Bidvest Wits	0	0	
30	Reyaad Pieterse	South Africa	GK	17 February 1992 (Aged 28)	(South Africa) Supersport United	2	0	
34	Jody February	South Africa	GK	12 May 1996 (Aged 25)	(South Africa)	0	0	
39	Abram Ngcobo	South Africa	GK	13 February 1996 (Aged 25)	(South Africa)	0	0	
Defenders
3	Ricardo Nascimento	Brazil	DF	7 February 1987 (Aged 33)	(Portugal) Académica	118	15	1
4	Tebogo Langerman	South Africa	DF	6 May 1986 (Aged 34)	(South Africa) Supersport Unite1up	267	7	24
5	Mosa Lebusa	South Africa	DF	10 October 1992 (Aged 28)	(South Africa) Ajax Cape Town	65	3	1
13	Nyiko Mobbie	South Africa	DF		(South Africa) Bidvest Wits	1	0	0
25	Khuliso Mudau	South Africa	DF	26 April 1995 (Aged 25)	(South Africa) Black Leopards	6	0	0
27	Thapelo Morena	South Africa	DF	6 August 1993 (Aged 27)	(South Africa) Bloemfontein Celtic	155	9	18
29	Soumahoro Bangaly	Ivory Coast	DF	18 July 1991 (Aged 29)	(Ivory Coast) ASEC Mimosas	66	2	0
40	Rivaldo Coetzee	South Africa	DF	16 August 1996 (Aged 24)	(South Africa) Ajax Cape Town	45	0	4
6	Brian Onyango	Tanzania	DF	24 July 1994 (Aged 26)	(South Africa) Maritzburg United	5	0	0
Midfielders
8	Hlompho Kekana (C)	South Africa	MF	23 May 1985 (Aged 35)	(South Africa) Bloemfontein Celtic	357	38	22
12	George Maluleka	South Africa	MF	7 January 1989 (Age 31)	(South Africa) Kaizer Chiefs	5	0	0
13	Tiyani Mabunda	South Africa	MF	17 April 1988 (Age 32)	(South Africa) Free State Stars (on loan)	145	5	1
15	Andile Jali	South Africa	MF	10 April 1990 (Age 30)	(Belgium) K.V. Oostende1	63	1	1
16	Aubrey Modiba	South Africa	MF	22 July 1995 (Age 25)	(South Africa) Supersport United	4	0	0
24	Sibusiso Vilakazi	South Africa	MF	29 December 1989 (Age 31)	(South Africa) Free State Stars	118	28	20
41	Mothobi Mvala	South Africa	MF	14 June 1994 (Age 26)	(South Africa) Highlands Park	4	2	0
31	Grant Margeman	South Africa	MF	(Age 22)	(South Africa) Ajax Cape Town	1	0	0
35	Sibusiso Khumalo	South Africa	MF	8 March 1991 (Age 29)	(South Africa) Maritzburg United (on loan)	4	0	0
Forwards
7	Lyle Lakay	South Africa	FW	17 August 1991 (Age 29)	(South Africa) Cape Town City	85	5	8
9	Mauricio Affonso	Uruguay	FW	26 January 1992 (Age 28)	(Peru) Alianza Lima	14	6	0
10	Gaston Sirino	Uruguay	FW	22 February 1991 (Age 29)	(Bolivia) Club Bolívar	100	24	29
11	Kermit Erasmus	South Africa	FW	8 July 1990 (Age 30)	(South Africa) Cape Town City	4	2	3
18	Themba Zwane	South Africa	FW	3 August 1989 (Age 31)	(South Africa) MP Black Aces	259	53	37
19	Phakamani Mahlambi	South Africa	FW	12 September 1997 (Age 23)	(Egypt) Al Ahly	44	7	1
21	Siphelele Mkhulise	South Africa	FW	19 February 1996 (Age 25)	Academy	8	1	
23	Haashim Domingo	South Africa	FW	13 August 1995 (Age 25)	(South Africa) Bidvest Wits	4	0	
26	Keletso Makgalwa	South Africa	FW	3 January 1997	(South Africa) Maritzburg United (on loan)	31	7	2
33	Lebohang Maboe	South Africa	FW	17 September 1994 (Age 26)	(South Africa) Maritzburg United	97	13	11
36	Promise Mkhuma	South Africa	FW	24 May 2000 (Age 20)	Academy	7	0	0
38	Peter Shalulile	Namibia	FW	23 September 1993 (Age 27)	(South Africa) Highlands Park	12	8	3
–	Gift Motupa	South Africa	FW	23 September 1994 (Age 27)	(South Africa) Supersport United	0	0	0
–	Lesedi Kapinga	South Africa	FW	25 May 1995 (Age 25)	(South Africa) Black Leopards	3	0	
–	Keletso Otladisa	South Africa	FW	0	0	0	0	0

== Transfers ==
Date	Position	Name	From	Fee	Ref.
26 September 2020	GK	Ricardo Goss	Bidvest Wits	Free transfer	
26 September 2020	FW	Haashim Domingo	Bidvest Wits	Free transfer	
26 September 2020	MF	Gift Motupa	Bidvest Wits	Free transfer	
29 January 2020	DF	Rushine De Reuck	Maritzburg United	Undisclosed	
	DF	George Maluleka	Kaizer Chiefs	Free transfer	
	MF	Aubrey Modiba	SuperSport United	Free transfer	
	FW	(Namibia) Peter Shalulile	Highlands Park	Free transfer	

== Competitions ==
=== Overview ===
Competition	First match	Last match	Starting round	Final position	Record							
Competition	First match	Last match	Starting round	Final position	Pld	W	D	L	GF	GA	GD	Win %
Premier Soccer League	24 August 2020	5 June 2021	Matchday 1	1st Place	30	19	10	1	49	14	+35	63.33
MTN 8	16 August 2020	16 August 2020	Quarter final	Quarter final	1	0	0	1	0	1	−1	0.00
Champions League	22 December 2020	22 May 2021	First round	Quarter final	10	6	2	2	16	8	+8	60.00
Nedbank Cup	3 February 2021	18 April 2021	Round 32	Semi final	4	3	1	0	11	3	+8	75.00
Total					45	28	13	4	76	26	+50	62.22

Source: Competitions

=== Premier Soccer League ===
==== League table ====
Pos	Team	Pld	W	D	L	GF	GA	GD	Pts	Qualification or relegation
1	Mamelodi Sundowns (C)	30	19	10	1	49	14	+35	67	Qualification for Champions League
2	AmaZulu	30	15	9	6	38	23	+15	54	Qualification for Champions League
3	Orlando Pirates	30	13	11	6	33	22	+11	50	Qualification for Confederation Cup
4	Lamontville Golden Arrows	30	11	14	5	40	28	+12	47	
5	SuperSport United	30	11	12	7	37	31	+6	45	

Updated to match(es) played on 5 June 2021. Source: Premier Soccer League
(C) Champions

==== Results summary ====
Overall								Home						Away					
Pld	W	D	L	GF	GA	GD	Pts	W	D	L	GF	GA	GD	W	D	L	GF	GA	GD
30	19	10	1	34	12	+22	67	9	5	1	16	6	+10	10	5	0	18	6	+12

Last updated: 4 November 2020.
Source: "Sundowns Results".

==== Results by matchday ====
Matchday	1	2	3	4	5	6	7	8	9	10	11	12	13	14	15	16	17	18	19	20	21	22	23	24	25	26	27	28	29	30
Ground	A	H	A	H	H	A	H	A	H	A	A	H	H	A	H	H	A	H	A	A	A	H	H	A	H	A	H	A	A	H
Results	W	D	W	W	W	D	W	D	W	W	D	D	D	W	W	W	W	D	W	W	W	L	D	W	W	W	W	D	W	W
Position	1	2	1	1	1	1	1	1	1	1	1	1	1	1	1	1	1	1	1	1	1	1	1	1	1	1	1	1	1	1

Updated to match(es) played on 4 November 2020. Source:
A = Away; H = Home; W = Win; D = Draw; L = Loss

==== Results ====
24 October 2020 1	Kaizer Chiefs	0–3	Mamelodi Sundowns	Johannesburg
15:30 SAST	W.Katsande (yellow card) 41'	Report	P.Shalulile 37' (yellow card) 64'; K.Erasmus 54'; T.Zwane 89' (pen.)	Stadium: FNB Stadium; Attendance: 0

2	Mamelodi Sundowns	0–0	Tshakhuma Tsha Madzivhandila	Pretoria
19:30	S.Mkhulise (yellow card) 21'; K.Makgalwa (yellow card) 77'	Report	C.Ngema (yellow card) 50'; M.Timm (yellow card) 55'; L.Lamola (yellow card) 84'	Stadium: Lucas Moripe; Attendance: 0

4 November 2020 3	Cape Town City	0–2	Mamelodi Sundowns	Cape Town
19:30	A.Mobara (yellow card) 34'; T.Fielies (yellow card) 69'	Report	L.Lakay 8'; P.Shalulile (yellow card) 28'; K.Makgalwa 83'	Stadium: Cape Town

22 November 2020 4	Mamelodi Sundowns	4–3	AmaZulu F.C.	Pretoria, GP
15:30 UTC+2	T.Zwane 19', 21', 30'; P.Shalulile 56'	Report	L. Majoro 15'; A.Mulenga 48'; S.Khumalo 59'	Stadium: Loftus Versfeld Stadium

27 November 2020 5	Mamelodi Sundowns	3–0	Stellenbosch FC	Pretoria, GP
18:00 UTC +2	P.Shalulile 7'; K.Erasmus 26'; T.Zwane 62'		J.Mendieta (yellow card) 48'	Stadium: Loftus Versfeld; Referee: Jeni Chavani

5 December 2020 6	Maritzburg United	1–1	Mamelodi Sundowns	Pietermaritzburg, KZN
20:15	K.Mngonyama 60'; F.Hachi (yellow card) 71'; K.Buchanan (yellow card) 79'; Tim Graham (yellow card) 90+1'		T.Zwane 32'; K.Erasmus (yellow card) 37'	Stadium: Harry Gwala Stadium; Referee: Victor Gomes

15 December 2020 7	Mamelodi Sundowns	2–0	TS Galaxy	Pretoria, GP
19:30	P.Shalulile 32'; T.Zwane 76'; L.Lakay (yellow card) 78'			Stadium: Loftus Versfeld

19 November 2020 8	Golden Arrows	1–1	Mamelodi Sundowns	Durban, KZN
15:00 UTC +2	M.Gumede 22'; M.Mathiane (yellow card) 59'		M.Mvala 17'	Stadium: Sugar Ray Xulu Stadium; Referee: Jenny Chavani

2 January 2020 9	Mamelodi Sundowns	1–0	Orlando Pirates	Pretoria, GP
15:30 UTC +2	B.Onyango 35'	Report	V.Pule (yellow card) 29'; T.Hlatshwayo (yellow card) 32'	Stadium: Loftus Versfeld; Referee: Philip Tinyane

9 January 2021 10	Baroka FC	0–2	Mamelodi Sundowns	Polokwane, LP
15:00 UTC+2			M.Mvala (yellow card) 41'; L.Lakay 57'; A.Jali (yellow card) 81'; T.Zwane 90'	Stadium: Peter Mokaba; Referee: Abongile Tom

16 January 2021 11	Supersport United	0–0	Mamelodi Sundowns	Pretoria, GP
15:00 UTC+2			L.Maboe (yellow card) 45+2'	Stadium: Lucas Moripe; Referee: Victor Gomes

19 January 2021 12	Mamelodi Sundowns	0–0	Bloemfontein Celtic	Pretoria, GP
17:00 UTC+2				Stadium: Lucas Moripe

23 January 2021 1	Mamelodi Sundowns	1–1	Swallows FC	Pretoria, GP
15:00 UTC+2	K.Erasmus 45'; S.Mkhulise (yellow card) 84'; G.Maluleka (yellow card) 95+6'		R.Gamaldien (yellow card) 31'; T.Matlaba (yellow card) 65'; M.Nyatama 90+7'	Stadium: Lucas Moripe; Referee: Luxolo Badi

27 January 2021 1	Black Leopards	2–1	Mamelodi Sundowns	Thohoyandou, LP
17:00 UTC+2	O.Karuru 46'		P.Shalulile 64', 90+5'	Stadium: Thohoyandou Stadium

30 January 2020 15	Mamelodi Sundowns	2–0	Chippa United	Pretoria, GP
15:30 UTC+2	L.Maboe 23'; G.Sirino 38'; S.Mkhulise (yellow card) 85'			Stadium: Loftus Versfeld Stadium; Referee: Victor Hlongwane

17 February 2021 16	Mamelodi Sundowns	2–0	Baroka FC	Pretoria, GP
17:00 UTC+2	G.Sirino 63'; P.Shalulile 68'			Stadium: Loftus Versfeld

13 March 2021 17	Stellenbosch FC	1–2	Mamelodi Sundowns	Cape Town, WP
13:00 UTC+2	S.Dimgba 33'; Z.Macheke (yellow card) 71'; S.Stephens (yellow card) 76'		G.Sirino 51'; P.Shalulile 90+5'	Stadium: Danie Craven Stadium

21 March 2021 18	Mamelodi Sundowns	1–1	Black Leopards	Pretoria, GP
17:00 UTC+2	M.Lebusa 10'; L. Maboe (yellow card) 45+8'; Kingdom. Mudau		(yellow card) 72' K.Masia; R.Kabwe 80'	Stadium: Loftus Versfeld; Referee: Philangenkosi Khumalo

7 April 2021 19	Tshakhuma FC	1–3	Mamelodi Sundowns	Polokwane, LP
15:00 UTC+2	T.Nevhulamba 18'		R.Coetzee 45+2'; S.Mkhulise 69'; S.Vilakazi 82'	Stadium: Peter Mokaba Stadium

12 April 2021 20	Chippa United	1–2	Mamelodi Sundowns	Mdantsane, EC
15:00 UTC+2	A.Chidi Kwem 49'		T.Zwane 16' (pen.); P.Shalulile 74'	Stadium: Sisa Dukashe Stadium

22 April 2021 21	AmaZulu F.C.	0–0	Mamelodi Sundowns	Durban, KZN
15:00 UTC+2				Stadium: Kings Park Stadium

24 April 2021 22	Mamelodi Sundowns	1–2	Kaiser chiefs	Pretoria, Gp
15:00 UTC+2	G.Sirino 34'; R.Nascimento (yellow card) 80'; L.Maboe (yellow card) 90'		D.Cardoso (yellow card) 44'; M.Lebusa 72' (o.g.); D.Zuma 74'	Stadium: Loftus Versfeld; Referee: Philip Tinyani

28 April 2021 23	Mamelodi Sundowns	0–0	Golden Arrows	Pretoria, GP
17:00 UTC+2	L.Maboe (yellow card) 12'		K.Mutizwa (yellow card) 6' G.Shitolo (yellow card) 21'; S.Parusnath (yellow card) 71'; D.Lungu (yellow card) 74'	Stadium: Loftus Versfeld; Attendance: 0 Referee: Victor Gomes

9 May 2021 27	TS Galaxy	0–1	Mamelodi Sundowns	Mbombela, MP
14:00 UTC+2	W.Lakay (yellow card) 64'; G.Modisane (yellow card) 90+'		P.Shalulile 17'; M.Mvala (yellow card) 89'	Stadium: Mbombela Stadium; Referee: Tshidiso Mkhwanazi

29 May 2021 28	Swallows FC	0–0	Mamelodi Sundowns	Soweto, Johannesburg, GP
17:00 UTC+2	T.Matlaba (yellow card) 63'		L.Lakay (yellow card) 90+'	Stadium: Dobsonville Stadium; Referee: Thando Ndzandzeka

3 June 2021 29	Bloemfontein Celtic	0–2	Mamelodi Sundowns	Bloemfontein, FS
17:00 UTC+2	T.Rikhotso (yellow card) 90+'; L.Phalane (yellow card) 90+'		P.Shalulile 11', 65'; G.Margeman (yellow card) 86'; R.De Reuck (yellow card) 90+'	Stadium: Dr.Petrus Molemela Stadium; Referee: T.Mkhabela

5 June 2021 30	Mamelodi Sundowns	3–0	Cape Town City FC	Pretoria, GP
15:00 UTC+2	L.Lakay 10'; A.Jali (yellow card) 56'; P.Shalulile 76', 82'; P.Mkhuma (yellow card) 88'			Stadium: Loftus Versfeld; Attendance: 0 Referee: M.Kheswa

=== MTN 8 ===
18 October 2020 Quarter final	Mamelodi Sundowns	0–1	Bloemfontein Celtic	Pretoria
15:00 SAST	R.Coetzee (yellow card) 27'; M.Madisha (yellow card) 40'	Report	S.Motebang (yellow card) 24'; V.Letsoalo 69'; T.Mangweni (yellow card) 90+6'	Stadium: Luca Moripe

=== Nedbank Cup ===
Mamelodi Sundowns entered the competition in the Round of 32

4 Feb 2021	Mamelodi Sundowns	3–2 (a.e.t.)	Stellenbosch	Pretoria, GP
17:00	P.Shalulile 16', 117'; L.Sirino 90+1'		A. Du Preez 12'; P. Nange 90+3'	Stadium: Loftus Versfeld

11 March 2021 Last 16	Mamelodi Sundowns	4–0	Polokwane City FC	Pretoria, GP
	P.Shalulile 10'; L.Maboe 15'; L.Kapinga 16'; A.Jali 28' (pen.)			Stadium: Loftus Versfeld Stadium

15 April 2021 Quarter final	Mamelodi Sundowns	4–1	Orlando Pirates	Pretoria, GP
18:00 UTC+2	P.Shalulile 12'; L. Maboe (yellow card) 29'; T.Zwane 49'; L. Kapinga 78'; H.Kekana 86'		T.Hlatshwayo (yellow card) 16'; T.Mabaso 33'; F.Mhango (yellow card) 45+3'	Stadium: Loftus Versfeld; Referee: Philip Tiane

18 April 2021 Semi final	Mamelodi Sundowns	0–0 (a.e.t.)	Tshakhuma Tsha Madzivhandila FC	Pretoria, GP
15:00 UTC+2	L.Sirino (yellow card) 51'		D.Manaka (yellow card) 20'	Stadium: Loftus Versfeld; Referee: Jenny Chavani
	Penalties
	L. Lakay (penalty scored); S. Vilakazi (penalty scored); R.Nascimento (penalty scored); T.Morena (penalty scored); T.Zwane (penalty scored); H. Kekana (penalty missed)		(penalty scored) L. Nonyane; (penalty scored) A.Ndengane; (penalty scored) Mlangwana; (penalty scored) Farai Madhanaga; (penalty scored) M. Ngele; (penalty scored) them bisque Nevhulamba

=== CAF Champions League ===
Mamelodi Sundowns entered the competition in the first round

==== First round ====
The draw for the First Round was on 9 November 2020.

22–23 December 2020 First round	(Botswana) Jwaneng Galaxy	0–2	(South Africa) Mamelodi Sundowns	Lobatse
15:00 UTC +2			M.Mvala 10'; P.Shalulile 46' (pen.)	Stadium: Lobatse Stadium; Referee: (Seychelles) Bernard Camille

5 January 2020 2nd Leg	Mamelodi Sundowns	3–1	Jwaneng Galaxy	Pretoria, GP
18:00 UTC+2	K.Erasmus 39'; M.Mvala 68'; T.Morena 81'		T.Sembowa 89'	Stadium: Loftus Versfeld; Referee: (Lesotho) Retselisitsoe Molise

==== Group stage ====
The draw for the group stage was held on 8 January 2021

Pos	Team	Pld	W	D	L	GF	GA	GD	Pts	Qualification	MSD	CRB	TPM	HIL
1	(South Africa) Mamelodi Sundowns	6	4	1	1	10	4	+6	13	Advance to knockout stage	—	0–2	1–0	2–0
2	(Algeria) CR Belouizdad	6	2	3	1	6	6	0	9	Advance to knockout stage	1–5	—	2–0	1–1
3	(Democratic Republic of the Congo) TP Mazembe	6	1	2	3	3	6	−3	5		1–2	0–0	—	2–1
4	(Sudan) Al Hilal	6	0	4	2	2	5	−3	4		0–0	0–0	0–0	—

Source: Soccerway
Rules for classification: Group stage tiebreakers

13 February 2021 Day 1	(South Africa) Mamelodi Sundowns	2–0	(Sudan) Al-Hilal	Pretoria, GP
18:00 UTC+2	M.Lebusa 10'; K.Erasmus 90'	Report		Stadium: Loftus Versfeld; Referee: (Egypt) Gehad Grisha

28 February 2021 Day 2	(Algeria) CR Belouizdad	1–5	(South Africa) Mamelodi Sundowns	Dar es Salaam, Tanzania
15:00 UTC+2	A.Sayoud 44'		T.Zwane 5' (pen.), 55'; P.Shalulile 48'; L.Maboe 75'; K.Erasmus 89'	Stadium: National Stadium,

7 March 2021 Day 3	(Democratic Republic of the Congo) TP Mazembe	1–2	(South Africa) Mamelodi Sundowns	Lubumbashi
14:00	M.Mputu 82'		P.Shalulile 67'; L.Lakay 90'	Stadium: Stade TP Mazembe

16 March 2021 Day 4	(South Africa) Mamelodi Sundowns	1–0	(Democratic Republic of the Congo) TP Mazembe	Pretoria
18:00 UTC+2	L.Maboe 28'			Stadium: Loftus Versfeld

2 April 2021 Day 5	(Sudan) Al-Hilal	0–0	(South Africa) Mamelodi Sundowns	Omdurman
18:00				Stadium: Al-Hilal Stadium

== Statistics ==
=== Appearances ===
Players with no appearances not included in the list.

As of match played 2 November 2020

No.	Pos.	Nat.	Name	Premier Soccer League		Nedbank Cup		MTN 8		Champions League		Total	
No.	Pos.	Nat.	Name	Apps	Starts	Apps	Starts	Apps	Starts	Apps	Starts	Apps	Starts
1	GK	ZAM	Kennedy Mweene	3	3	–	–	1	1	2	1	6	5
3	DF	BRA	Ricardo Nascimento	17	16	1	1	1	1	8	8	27	26
4	DF	RSA	Tebogo Langerman	6	4	–	–	–	–	–	–	6	4
5	DF	RSA	Mosa Lebusa	19	18	1	1	–	–	7	7	27	26
6	DF	KEN	Brian Onyango	12	9	–	–	0	0	2	2	14	11
7	MD	RSA	Lyle Lakay	23	20	1	1	1	1	10	6	35	'28
8	MF	RSA	Hlompho Kekana	8	5	–	–	1	1	3	2	11	8
9	FW	URU	Mauricio Affonso	5	0	–	–	0	0	3	1	8	1
10	FW	URU	Gaston Sirino	15	11	1	1	1	1	7	7	24	20
11	FW	RSA	Kermit Erasmus	17	12	–	–	1	1	6	1	24	14
12	MF	RSA	George Maluleka	11	5	–	–	–	–	2	1	13	6
14	GK	UGA	Denis Onyango	25	25	0	0	2	2	7	7	34	34
15	MF	RSA	Andile Jali	20	16	1	1	–	–	6	3	27	20
18	MF	RSA	Themba Zwane	25	25	1	1	1	1	5	5	32	32
19	FW	RSA	Gift Motupa	8	4	–	–	0	0	3	1	11	5
20	GK	RSA	Ricardo Goss	0	0	1	1	0	0	2	2	3	3
21	MF	RSA	Sphelele Mkhulise	16	13	1	1	–	–	8	7	25	21
22	FW	RSA	Lesedi Kapinga	12	0	–	–	0	0	3	0	"15'	0
23	FW	RSA	Haashim Domingo	11	2	–	–	1	1	2	–	14	3
24	MF	RSA	Sibusiso Vilakazi	6	0	–	–	0	0	2	1	8	1
25	DF	RSA	Khuliso Mudau	11	4	–	–	–	–	4	3	15	7
26	FW	RSA	Keletso Makgalwa	6	0	–	–	–	–	2	–	8	0
27	DF	RSA	Thapelo Morena	25	23	–	–	–	–	9	8	34	31
28	DF	RSA	Rushine De Reuck	8	8	–	–	0	0	4	2	12	10
29	DF	CIV	Bangaly Soumahoro	2	0	–	–	0	0	1	1	3	1
30	GK	RSA	Reyaad Pieterse	1	1	–	–	0	0	0	0	1	1
31	MF	RSA	Grant Margeman	3	1	–	–	0	0	0	0	3	1
32	DF	RSA	Harold Majadibodu	2	0	–	–	0	0	0	0	2	0
33	MF	RSA	Lebohang Maboe	26	23	1	1	–	–	8	7	35	31
35	MF	RSA	Siphesihle Mkhize	1	1	–	–	0	0	1	0	2	1
36	FW	RSA	Promise Mkhuma	10	2	–	–	–	–	3	1	13	3
37	MF	RSA	Aubrey Modiba	18	9	–	–	0	0	7	5	25	14
38	MF	NAM	Peter Shalulile	24	24	1	1	2	1	9	9	36	35
40	DF	RSA	Rivaldo Coetzee	21	20	1	1	1	1	6	6	29	28
41	MF	RSA	Mothobi Mvala	17	10	–	–	0	0	5	5	22	15
43	DF	NAM	Nyiko Mobbie	0	0	–	–	1	1	–	–	1	1
Players who went out on loan or out permanently but have made an appearance for Mamelodi Sundowns prior to departing
2	DF	RSA	Motjeka Madisha	5	5	–	–	1	1	–	–	6	6

=== Goals ===
As of match played 10 January 2021

Rank	Pos.	No.	Nat.	Player	PSL	Nedbank Cup	MTN 8	Champions League	Total
1	MF	38	(Namibia)	Peter Shalulile	15	4	0	3	22
2	MF	18	(South Africa)	Themba Zwane	10	1	0	2	13
3	FW	11	(South Africa)	Kermit Erasmus	3	0	0	3	6
4	MF	10	(Uruguay)	Gaston Sirino	4	1	0	0	5
4	FW	33	(South Africa)	Lebohang Maboe	2	1	0	2	5
4	DF	7	(South Africa)	Lyle Lakay	4	–	0	1	5
8	DF	5	(South Africa)	Mosa Lebusa	1	–	0	2	3
8	MF	41	(South Africa)	Mothobi Mvala	1	0	0	2	3
8	MF	24	(South Africa)	Sibusiso Vilakazi	1	0	0	2	3
11	DF	3	(Brazil)	Ricardo Nascimento	2	0	0	0	2
12	DF	40	(South Africa)	Rivaldo Coetzee	1	0	0	0	1
12	MF	15	(South Africa)	Andile Jali	0	1	0	0	1
12	FW	22	(South Africa)	Lesedi Kapinga	0	1	0	0	1
12	MF	8	(South Africa)	Hlompho Kekana	0	1	0	0	1
12	FW	26	(South Africa)	Keletso Makgalwa	1	0	0	0	1
12	MF	21	(South Africa)	Sphelele Mkhulise	1	0	0	0	1
12	MF	37	(South Africa)	Aubrey Modiba	1	0	0	0	1
12	DF	27	(South Africa)	Thapelo Morena	0	0	0	1	1
12	FW	19	(South Africa)	Gift Motupa	1	0	0	0	1
12	DF	6	(Kenya)	Brian Onyango	1	0	0	0	1

==== Assists ====
Rank	Pos.	Nat.	Player	PSL	Nedbank Cup	MTN 8	Champions League	Total
1	FW	(South Africa)	Kermit Erasmus	3	–	0	–	3
1	DF	(South Africa)	Rivaldo Coetzee	2	–	0	–	2
2	MF	(South Africa)	Andile Jali	1	–	0	–	1
2	DF	(South Africa)	Lyle Lakay	4	–	0	–	4
2	MF	(South Africa)	Lebohang Maboe	2	–	0	–	2
2	FW	(Namibia)	Peter Shalulile	6	–	0	–	6
2	DF	(Brazil)	Ricardo Nascimento	1	0	0	0	1
2	MF	(South Africa)	George Maluleka	1				1
3	FW	(South Africa)	Themba Zwane	1				1

=== Clean Sheets ===
Rank	Nat	Name	PSL	MTN 8	Nedbank Cup	CCL	Total
1	(Uganda)	Denis Onyango	15				
2	(Zambia)	Kennedy Mweene	1				
