= Keletso Makgalwa =

South African soccer player

Personal information
- Full name: Matlala Keletso Makgalwa
- Date of birth: 3 January 1997 (age 29)
- Place of birth: Mokopane, South Africa
- Height: 1.70 m (5 ft 7 in)
- Position: Midfielder

Team information
- Current team: Sekhukhune United
- Number: 7

Senior career*
Years	Team	Apps	(Gls)
2018–2024	Mamelodi Sundowns	24	(4)
2018–2019	→ Maritzburg United (loan)	16	(1)
2021–2022	→ Moroka Swallows (loan)	22	(1)
2022	→ TS Galaxy (loan)	5	(0)
2023	→ All Stars (loan)	13	(2)
2023–2024	→ Upington City (loan)	23	(10)
2024–	Sekhukhune United	41	(4)
- * Club domestic league appearances and goals as of 4 January 2026

Matlala Keletso Makgalwa (born 3 January 1997) is a South African professional soccer player who plays as a midfielder for South African Premier Division club Sekhukhune United.

== Career ==
Magkalwa plays for Sekhukhune United and has had a loan spell at Maritzburg United, Moroka Swallows, TS Galaxy, All Stars and Upington City.

== Honours ==
Mamelodi Sundowns

- South African Premier Division: 2017–18, 2019–20
- Nedbank Cup: 2019–20
- Telkom Knockout: 2019
