= Rivaldo Coetzee =

South African soccer player (born 1996)

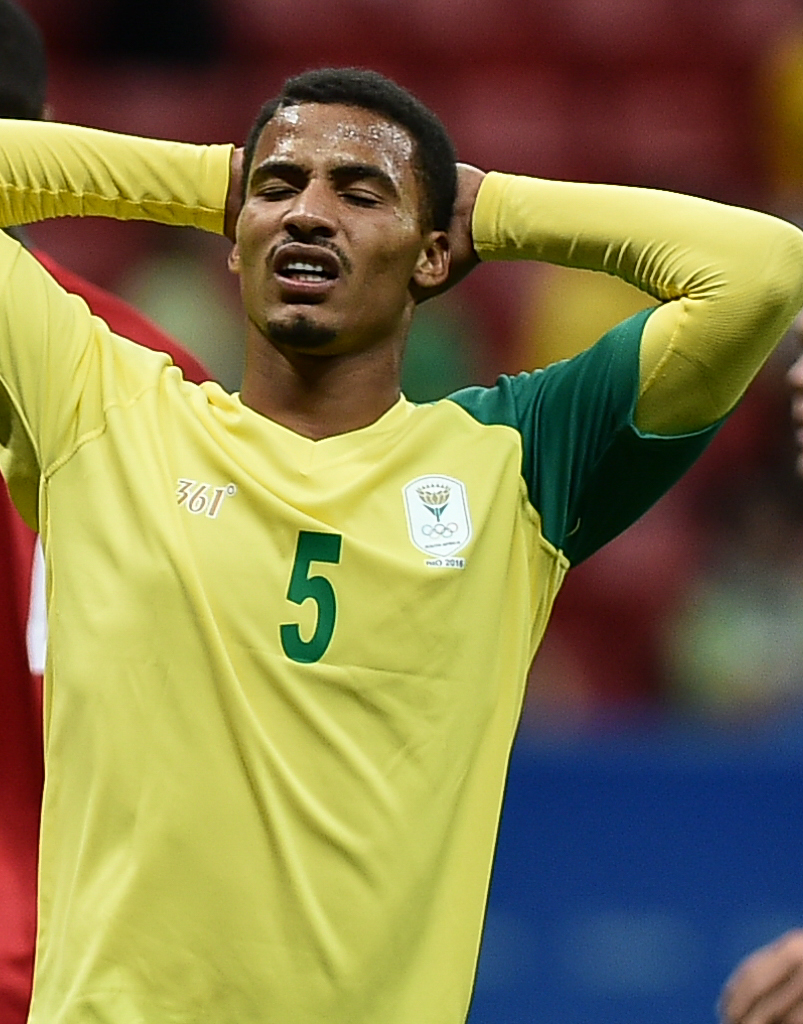
- Coetzee with South Africa Olympic football team in 2016.

Personal information
- Full name: Rivaldo Roberto Genino Coetzee
- Date of birth: 16 October 1996 (age 30)
- Place of birth: Kakamas, South Africa
- Height: 1.83 m (6 ft 0 in)
- Position: Centre back

Team information
- Current team: Sekhukhune United
- Number: 44

Youth career
- Kakamas Sundowns
- Ajax Cape Town

Senior career*
Years	Team	Apps	(Gls)
2014–2017	Ajax Cape Town	96	(1)
2017–2025	Mamelodi Sundowns	83	(2)
2026–	Sekhukhune United	3	(0)

International career^{‡}
2014–	South Africa	24	(0)
2015	South Africa U23	5	(0)
2016	South Africa Olympic	3	(0)
- * Club domestic league appearances and goals as of 21 June 2026 ‡ National team caps and goals as of 09:44, 3 October 2020 (UTC)

Rivaldo Roberto Genino Coetzee (born 16 October 1996) is a South African professional soccer player who plays as a defender for South African Premiership club Sekhukhune United.

A graduate of the Ajax Cape Town academy, Coetzee made his professional debut in 2014 at the age of 17 and made just under 100 appearances for the club. In 2017, he won the club's Player of the Season award before signing for Mamelodi Sundowns later in the year. He is also a full international and, upon making his international debut in 2014, became the youngest player ever to represent South Africa at the age of 17 years and 361 days, though this record has since been broken by Fagrie Lakay.

== Club career ==
=== Ajax Cape Town ===
Coetzee is a product of Ajax Cape Town's youth academy, having joined the club at the age of 15. He made his first team debut at the age of 17 in February 2014 and won the club's Player of the Season and Player's Player of the Season awards at the end of the 2016–17 PSL season. He scored his first goal for the club on 19 August 2017, netting in a 1–1 draw with Golden Arrows, before having to be withdrawn through injury.

Two days later, Ajax announced that they had agreed to sell Coetzee to Scottish Premiership club Celtic. The proposed transfer later collapsed, however, as the player failed his medical after it was discovered that he had an underlying issue in his right foot.

=== Mamelodi Sundowns ===
Despite having failed a medical with Celtic days before, Coetzee signed for Ajax's PSL rivals Mamelodi Sundowns on the transfer deadline day for a reported fee of R10m plus Mario Booysen. He underwent corrective surgery on his foot soon after his arrival which resulted in him missing the entire 2017–18 South African Premier Division campaign. In August 2018, Sundowns coach Pitso Mosimane revealed that Coetzee's ailment was more serious than first feared and that "he can still stay two years without playing to get better". However Coetzee did recover and has become an integral member of the Sundowns team since. While he began his career as a central defender, Coetzee was converted to a central midfield role at Sundowns, and it is now his preferred position.

== International career ==
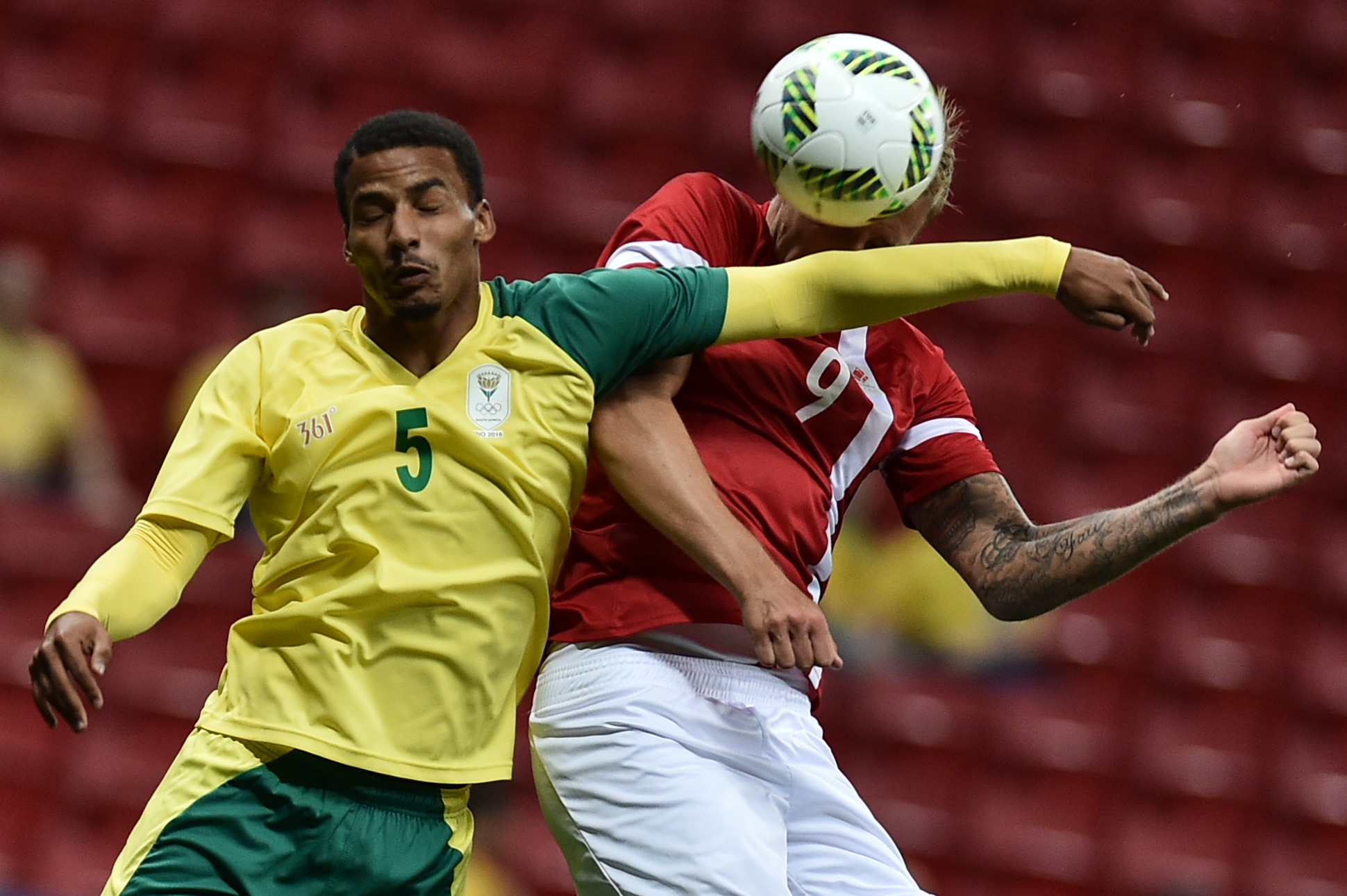
Coetzee competing for the ball at the 2016 Rio Olympics.

Coetzee made his international debut for South Africa in an African Nations Cup qualifier against Congo on 12 October 2014 making him the youngest player ever to represent the country, aged 17 years and 361 days – a record that was later broken by Supersport United forward Fagrie Lakay.

He was selected in South Africa's squad for the 2015 Africa Cup of Nations in Equatorial Guinea. In the nation's opening game, a 1–3 defeat to Algeria, he had to be replaced by Siyabonga Nhlapo after 29 minutes due to injury.

He also played at the 2015 Africa U-23 Cup of Nations.

== Honours ==
=== Club ===
Ajax Cape Town

- MTN 8: 2015

Mamelodi Sundowns

- MTN 8: 2021
- South African Premier Division (3): (2018-19, 2019-20, 2020-21, 2022–23
- Nedbank Cup: (2019-20)
- Telkom Knockout: (2019)

▪️ African Football league 2023
