= Roelf =

Roelf is both a Dutch masculine given name and surname. Notable people with the name include:

== Given name ==
- Roelf Beukes, South African military officer
- Roelf de Boer (born 1949), Dutch politician
- Roelf Meyer (born 1947), South African politician and businessman
- Roelf Vos (1921–1992), Dutch Australian businessman

== Surname ==
- Jan Roelfs (born 1957), Dutch production designer
- Gregory Roelf (born 1988), South African soccer player
