= Rushine De Reuck =

South African soccer player

Personal information
- Date of birth: 1 January 1996 (age 30)
- Place of birth: Cape Town, South Africa
- Height: 1.83 m (6 ft 0 in)
- Positions: Defender; defensive midfielder

Team information
- Current team: Simba S.C.
- Number: 23

Youth career
- –2014: ASD Academy
- 2014–2015: Paços de Ferreira

Senior career*
Years	Team	Apps	(Gls)
2015–2016	Hellenic		
2017–2021	Maritzburg United	77	(1)
2021–2025	Mamelodi Sundowns	44	(1)
2024–2025	→ Maccabi Petah Tikva F.C. (loan)		
2025–	Simba S.C.		

International career^{‡}
2021–	South Africa	7	(0)
- * Club domestic league appearances and goals as of 30 June 2024 ‡ National team caps and goals as of 19:10, 6 August 2021 (UTC)

Rushine De Reuck (born 9 February 1996) is a South African professional soccer player who plays as a defender or defensive midfielder for Tanzanian Premier League side Simba S.C. and the South Africa national team.

== Club career ==
De Reuck played for the ASD Academy in Cape Town as a young player and had a trial with Porto in 2014. Following a two-week trial at Paços de Ferreira he signed for the club in September 2014 on a contract until January 2015. De Reuck returned to South Africa shortly afterwards, originally temporarily, but following a change of coach at Paços de Ferreira, he decided to remain in South Africa. De Reuck later revealed he learnt a lot from then Paços de Ferreira manager Paulo Fonseca. Following his return to South Africa, De Reuck had trials with Ajax Cape Town, Cape Town All Stars, Milano United and Mbombela United, but was rejected by all of them, before playing for Hellenic for a season.

=== Maritzburg United ===
In the summer of 2017, De Reuck signed for South African Premier Division side Maritzburg United on a two-year contract. His debut for Maritzburg United came on 20 August 2017 in a 2–0 victory away to Platinum Stars, and he went on to appear 11 times in the league for Maritzburg over the course of the 2017–18 season. The 2018–19 season saw him play more regularly for the club, making 25 league appearances for the club over the course of the season.

De Reuck started the 2019–20 season strongly and was linked with a call-up to the South Africa national football team. In December 2019, Maritzburg United manager Eric Tinkler said that De Reuck had 'a lot of qualities', but that 'there's still a lot for him to improve on', citing his decision-making as an area in which he could improve In June 2020, De Reuck revealed he was "surprised", given his form, not to be called up to the South Africa national football squad.

=== Mamelodi Sundowns ===
He signed for Mamelodi Sundowns on a five-year deal on 30 January 2021.

==== Maccabi Petah Tikva ====
He spent the 2024 season on loan at Maccabi Petah Tikva F.C. in Israel but got injured.

=== Simba S.C. ===
In July 2025 he signed with Tanzanian Premier League side Simba S.C.

== International career ==
De Reuck made his debut for South Africa on 10 June 2021 in a 3–2 friendly win over Uganda. He made 6 appearances as South Africa won the 2021 COSAFA Cup.

== Style of play ==
He can play as a centre-back, as a right-back or as a defensive midfielder.

== Personal life ==
De Reuck was born in Cape Town and grew up in the neighbourhood of Kalksteenfontein. He is a fan of South African club Kaizer Chiefs.

== Career statistics ==
As of match played 11 December 2021

Appearances and goals by club, season and competition
Club	Season	League			Nedbank Cup		Telkom Knockout		Other		Total	
Club	Season	Division	Apps	Goals	Apps	Goals	Apps	Goals	Apps	Goals	Apps	Goals
Maritzburg United	2017–18	South African Premier Division	11	0	5	0	0	0	1 (Note: Appearance(s) in MTN 8)	0	17	0
Maritzburg United	2018–19	South African Premier Division	25	0	1	0	0	0	5 (Note: 1 appearance in MTN 8, 4 appearances in PSL play-offs)	0	17	0
Maritzburg United	2019–20	South African Premier Division	30	1	1	0	4	0	0	0	35	1
Maritzburg United	2020–21	South African Premier Division	11	0	0	0	—		1	0	12	0
Maritzburg United	Total		77	1	7	0	4	0	7	0	95	1
Mamelodi Sundowns	2020–21	South African Premier Division	8	0	3	0	0	0	4 (Note: Appearance(s) in CAF Champions League)	0	15	0
Mamelodi Sundowns	2021–22	South African Premier Division	8	0	0	0	0	0	3	0	11	0
Mamelodi Sundowns	Total		16	0	3	0	0	0	7	0	26	0
Career total			93	1	10	0	4	0	14	0	121	1
