= Sibusiso Khumalo =

Sibusiso Khumalo may refer to:

- Sibusiso Khumalo (footballer, born 1989), South African, defender for Kaizer Chiefs
- Sibusiso Khumalo (footballer, born 1991), South African, midfielder for Maritzburg United, on loan from Mamelodi Sundowns
