= Dumisani Msibi =

South African soccer player

Personal information
- Full name: Dumisani Msibi
- Date of birth: 1 May 1995 (age 31)
- Place of birth: Piet Retief, South Africa
- Position: Goalkeeper

Team information
- Current team: Maritzburg United
- Number: 19

Youth career
- Real Zona
- UmNdeni FC
- Secunda United
- Zone Mavo
- –2014: SuperSport United

Senior career*
Years	Team	Apps	(Gls)
2014–2017	SuperSport United	2	(0)
2016–2017	→ Cape Town All Stars (loan)	10	(0)
2017–2018	Witbank Spurs	26	(0)
2018	Royal Eagles	2	(0)
2019	Real Kings	12	(0)
2019	Richards Bay	9	(0)
2020–2022	University of Pretoria	44	(0)
2022–2023	Uthongathi	18	(0)
2023–	Maritzburg United	17	(0)

International career^{‡}
2014–	South Africa	1	(0)
2015	South Africa 20	7	(0)
- * Club domestic league appearances and goals as of 11 January 2024 ‡ National team caps and goals as of 12 May 2016

Dumisani Msibi (born 1 May 1995) is a South African footballer who plays as a goalkeeper for Maritzburg United and has represented South Africa.

== Club career ==
=== SuperSport United ===
Msibi joined SuperSport United after trialling for the club in a tournament in which he was awarded the goalkeeper of the tournament accolade. In August 2015, Msibi extended his contract with SuperSport United for 4 years. However, 2 years later, after not playing for SuperSport United, the club allowed Msibi to leave to search for regular football, as Ronwen Williams, Reyaad Pieterse, and Boalefa Pule were picked ahead of him.

==== Loan to Cape Town All Stars ====
Msibi was loaned to Cape Town All Stars for the 2016–17 season. During the season he played 10 games, being the back-up keeper for Ludwe Mpakumpaku.

=== Witbank Spurs ===
After his release from SuperSport United, Msibi joined National First Division club Witbank Spurs.

=== Royal Eagles ===
In August 2018, Msibi joined Royal Eagles.

=== Real Kings ===
In January 2019, Msibi joined Real Kings, together with Zama Dlamini, to provide goalkeeping experience.

=== University of Pretoria ===
After a spell at Richards Bay, Msibi moved to University of Pretoria in January 2020.

== International career ==
Msibi made his debut for the South African senior team on 30 November 2014 in a 2–0 victory over the Ivory Coast, when he was subbed on for the last 9 minutes and received a yellow card for time wasting.

He was selected in South Africa's preliminary squad for the 2016 CHAN qualifier against Angola on 17 October 2015.

== Personal life ==
While playing football professionally, Msibi also studied sport management at Tshwane University of Technology.
