= Premiership Goalkeeper of the Season =

South African soccer award

The Premiership Goalkeeper of the Season is a South African soccer award granted by the Premier Soccer League (PSL) to the outstanding goalkeeper of a Premiership team.

Season	Goalkeeper	Club	Nationality
2006–07	Calvin Marlin	Mamelodi Sundowns	South Africa
2007–08	Itumeleng Khune	Kaizer Chiefs	South Africa
2008–09	Kennedy Mweene	Free State Stars	Zambia
2009–10	Moeneeb Josephs	Orlando Pirates	South Africa
2010–11	Patrick Tignyemb	Bloemfontein Celtic	Cameroon
2011–12	Wayne Sandilands	Mamelodi Sundowns	South Africa
2012–13	Itumeleng Khune (2)	Kaizer Chiefs	South Africa
2013–14	Itumeleng Khune (3)	Kaizer Chiefs	South Africa
2014–15	Moeneeb Josephs (2)	Bidvest Wits	South Africa
2015–16	Denis Onyango	Mamelodi Sundowns	Uganda
2016–17	Darren Keet	Bidvest Wits	South Africa
2017–18	Itumeleng Khune (4)	Kaizer Chiefs	South Africa
2018–19	Ronwen Williams	SuperSport United	South Africa
2019–20	Ronwen Williams (2)	SuperSport United	South Africa
2020–21	Denis Onyango (2)	Mamelodi Sundowns	Uganda
2021–22	Hugo Marques	Cape Town City	Angola
2022–23	Ronwen Williams (3)	Mamelodi Sundowns	South Africa
2023–24	Ronwen Williams (4)	Mamelodi Sundowns	South Africa
2024–25	Sipho Chaine	Orlando Pirates	South Africa
2025–26	Sipho Chaine (2)	Orlando Pirates	South Africa
