= Gastón Sirino =

Uruguayan-South African footballer (born 1991)

Personal information
- Full name: Leandro Gastón Serino Rodríguez
- Date of birth: 22 February 1991 (age 35)
- Place of birth: Montevideo, Uruguay
- Height: 1.66 m (5 ft 5 in)
- Position: Winger

Team information
- Current team: Durban City
- Number: 10

Youth career
- Peñarol
- Rampla Juniors

Senior career*
Years	Team	Apps	(Gls)
2011–2012	Rampla Juniors		
2012	Unión San Felipe B	9	(2)
2013–2015	Unión San Felipe	73	(15)
2015–2016	San Luis	40	(7)
2017	Bolívar	41	(18)
2018–2024	Mamelodi Sundowns	115	(16)
2024–	Kaizer Chiefs	37	(2)
2026	Durban City		
- * Club domestic league appearances and goals as of 23 May 2026

Leandro Gastón Sirino Rodríguez (born 22 February 1991) is a professional footballer who plays as a winger for South African Premiership club Kaizer Chiefs. Gaston Sirino cemented his legacy in the Premiership while playing for Mamelodi Sundowns from 2018 to 2024, clinching seven league titles with 'The Brazilians'. Born in Uruguay, he received his South Africa passport.

== Career ==
Sirino is a former youth academy player of Peñarol. He made his professional debut with Rampla Juniors in 2011 and moved to Chile to join Unión San Felipe the next year. In Chile, he started playing at the Segunda División Profesional with the B-team of Unión San Felipe.

In January 2017, he joined Bolivian club Bolívar.

Sirino joined South African club Mamelodi Sundowns in January 2018. On 12 September 2020, he scored the winner in 2019–20 Nedbank Cup final against Bloemfontein Celtic. In reference to Mercedes-AMG, he is nicknamed as AMG among the Sundowns fans.

== International career ==
Sirino received a South African passport in 2023, making him eligible to play for South Africa.

== Career statistics ==
Club	Season	League			Cup		League Cup		Continental		Others		Total	
Club	Season	Division	Apps	Goals	Apps	Goals	Apps	Goals	Apps	Goal	Apps	Goals	Apps	Goals
San Luis de Quillota	2015-16	Primera División	24	4									24	4
San Luis de Quillota	Total		24	4	0	0	0	0	0	0	0	0	24	4
Club Bolivar	2016-17	Primera División	10	1							3	0	13	1
Club Bolivar	Total		10	1	0	0	0	0	0	0	3	0	13	1
Mamelodi Sundowns	2017-18	Premiership	9	0	4	1	0	0	7	2	0	0	20	3
Mamelodi Sundowns	2018-19	Premiership	23	5	1	0	2	1	10	2	2	0	38	8
Mamelodi Sundowns	2019-20	Premiership	23	3	2	1	4	5	9	3	3	1	41	13
Mamelodi Sundowns	Total		55	8	7	2	6	6	26	7	5	1	99	24
Career Total			89	13	7	2	6	6	26	7	8	1	136	29

== Honours ==
Bolívar

- Bolivian Primera División: 2016–17

Mamelodi Sundowns

- South African Premiership: 2017–18, 2018–19, 2019–20, 2020–21, 2021–22
- Nedbank Cup: 2019–20, 2021–22
- Telkom Knockout: 2019
- MTN 8: 2021

Kaizer Chiefs

- 2024–25 Nedbank Cup
- 2024 Cufa Cup:2024
- 2024 Home of Legends Cup:2024
