= 2019 Telkom Knockout =

Tournament details
- Country: South Africa
- Dates: 18 October 2019 – 14 December 2019
- Teams: 16

Final positions
- Champions: Mamelodi Sundowns (4th title)
- Runners-up: Maritzburg United

Tournament statistics
- Matches played: 16
- Goals scored: 34 (2.13 per match)
- Top goal scorer: (5 goals) Gaston Sirino

The 2019 Telkom Knockout was the 38th edition and final edition of the Telkom Knockout, a South African cup competition comprising the 16 teams in the Premier Soccer League. It took place between October and December 2019 and was won by Mamelodi Sundowns.

== Teams ==
=== Stadium and Locations ===
Location of teams in the 2019 Telkom Knockout.

Team	Location	Stadium	Capacity
AmaZulu	Durban (Durban North)	King Goodwill Zwelithini Stadium	10,000
Baroka	Polokwane	Peter Mokaba Stadium	45,500
Black Leopards	Thohoyandou	Thohoyandou Stadium	40,000
Bloemfontein Celtic	Bloemfontein	Dr. Petrus Molemela Stadium	22,000
Cape Town City	Cape Town (Green Point)	Cape Town Stadium	55,000
Chippa United	Port Elizabeth	Nelson Mandela Bay Stadium	48,459
Golden Arrows	Durban(Lamontville)	Princess Magogo Stadium	12,000
Highlands Park	Johannesburg	Makhulong Stadium	13,500
Kaizer Chiefs	Johannesburg (Soweto)	FNB Stadium	94,736
Mamelodi Sundowns	Pretoria (Marabastad)	Loftus Versfeld Stadium, Pretoria	51,762
Maritzburg United	Pietermaritzburg	Harry Gwala Stadium	12,000
Orlando Pirates	Johannesburg (Soweto)	Orlando Stadium	37,139
Polokwane City	Polokwane	Peter Mokaba Stadium	45,500
Stellenbosch United	Stellenbosch	Coetzenburg Stadium	8,000
SuperSport United	Pretoria	Lucas Masterpieces Moripe Stadium, Pretoria	28,900
Wits	Johannesburg (Braamfontein)	Bidvest Stadium	5,000

== Round of 16 ==
18 October 2019
20:00

Maritzburg United	1–1 (a.e.t.)	Bidvest Wits
Kutumela 60'	Report	58' Dzvukamanja
Penalties
Sanoka (penalty missed); Xulu (penalty scored); Claasen (penalty scored); Moseamedi (penalty scored)	3–1	(penalty missed) Nange; (penalty missed) Hlanti; (penalty scored) Hotto; (penalty missed) Macuphu

Harry Gwala Stadium, Pietermaritzburg
19 October 2019
15:00

Cape Town City	1–1 (a.e.t.)	Kaizer Chiefs
Erasmus 34'	Report	84' Nurkovic
Penalties
Seedat (penalty missed); Nodada (penalty scored); Fielies (penalty missed); Dove (penalty scored)	2–4	(penalty scored) Cardoso; (penalty scored) Castro; (penalty scored) Billiat; (penalty missed) Manyama; (penalty scored) Mathoho

Cape Town Stadium, Green Point
19 October 2019
15:00

Golden Arrows	1–0 (a.e.t.)	Polokwane City
Motloung 101' (o.g.)	Report

Sugar Ray Xulu Stadium, Durban
19 October 2019
18:00

Orlando Pirates	1–0	Stellenbosch United
Lorch 84'	Report

Orlando Stadium, Soweto
19 October 2019
20h15

SuperSport United	1–1 (a.e.t.)	Baroka
Grobler 90+5'	Report	59' (pen.) Mdantsane
Penalties
Furman (penalty missed); Daniels (penalty missed); Mokoena (penalty scored); Grobler (penalty scored); Gabuza (penalty scored)	3–2	(penalty scored) Mdantsane; (penalty missed) Phiri Jr.; (penalty missed) Mbulu; (penalty scored) Sibiya; (penalty missed) Ngubane

Lucas Masterpieces Moripe Stadium, Pretoria
20 October 2019
15:00

Highlands Park	0–0 (a.e.t.)	Black Leopards
Penalties
Ndoro (penalty scored); Mbunjana (penalty scored); Mvala (penalty scored); Shalulile (penalty scored); Mokoena (penalty scored); Msimango (penalty scored)	6–5	(penalty scored) Musonda; (penalty scored) Zulu; (penalty scored) Mokoena; (penalty scored) Andrianarimanana; (penalty scored) Katjiukua; (penalty missed) Ndlovu

Makhulong Stadium, Tembisa

20 October 2019
15:00

Mamelodi Sundowns	5–0	AmaZulu
Meza 45+1'; Nyongo 55' (o.g.); Sirino 71' (pen.); Sirino 78'; Affonso 88'

Lucas Masterpieces Moripe Stadium, Pretoria
22 October 2019
19:30

Chippa United	1–0	Bloemfontein Celtic
Masalesa 79'

Sisa Dukashe Stadium, Mdantsane

== Quarter-finals ==
1 November 2019
20:00

Maritzburg United	1–1 (a.e.t.)	Highlands Park
Mbunjana 50' (o.g.)		14' Msane
Penalties
Cardodo (penalty scored); Billiat (penalty scored); Manyama (penalty scored); Parket (penalty scored)	4–2	(penalty scored) Jele; (penalty scored) Mhango; (penalty missed) Motshwari; (penalty missed) Abel Mabaso

Harry Gwala Stadium, Pietermaritzburg
2 November 2019
15:00

Kaizer Chiefs	2–2 (a.e.t.)	Orlando Pirates
Castro 62'; Cardoso 94' (pen.)		35' Makaringe; 100' Mhango
Penalties
Augusto (penalty missed); Xulu (penalty scored); Sanoka (penalty scored); Jappie (penalty scored); Nyoni (penalty scored)	4–2	(penalty missed) Msana; (penalty scored) Mbunjana; (penalty scored) Mokoena; (penalty missed) Shalulile; (penalty scored) Fransman

Moses Mabhida Stadium, Durban
2 November 2019
20:15

SuperSport United	0–1	Golden Arrows
		12' Mtshali

Mbombela Stadium, Mbombela
3 November 2019
15:00

Chippa United	2–2 (a.e.t.)	Mamelodi Sundowns
Kwem 13'; Maziya 58'		51' (pen.) Sirino; 70' Sirino
Penalties
Twala (penalty missed); Lentjies (penalty scored); Manzini (penalty scored); Nsabiyumva (penalty scored)	3–4	(penalty scored) Lakay; (penalty scored) Madisha; (penalty scored) Affonso; (penalty scored) Morena

Nelson Mandela Bay Stadium, Port Elizabeth

== Semi-finals ==
22 November 2019
15:00

Golden Arrows	1–2	Mamelodi Sundowns
80' Sibiya		11' Sirino; 36' Kekana

Referee: Victor Gomes
23 November 2019
15:00

Kaizer Chiefs	1–2	Maritzburg United
78' Sasman		30', 84' Moseamedi

== Final ==
Maritzburg United	1–2	Mamelodi Sundowns
39' J.Moseamedi		54' M.Affonso; 74'M.Affonso

Moses Mabhida Stadium, Durban

== Statistics ==
Rank	Player	Club(s)	Goal(s)
1	(Uruguay) (South Africa) Gaston Sirino	Mamelodi Sundowns	5
2	(South Africa) Judas Moseamedi	Maritzburg United	2
