= Sibiya =

Sibiya is a surname. Notable people with the surname include:

- Bheki Sibiya (born 1973), South African actor and director
- Duduzile Sibiya (born 1957), South African politician
- Jomo Sibiya, South African politician
- Linda Sibiya, South African disc jockey
- Maxwell Sibiya (born 1956), South African politician
- Nduduzo Sibiya (born 1995), South African footballer
- Nelisiwe Sibiya (born 1992), South African singer and actress
- Noluthando Mayende-Sibiya, South African politician and trade unionist
- Sipho Sibiya (born 1971), South African-Canadian footballer
- Vusi Sibiya (born 1994), South African footballer
