= Ricardo Goss =

South African soccer player (born 1994)

Personal information
- Full name: Stuart Ricardo Goss
- Date of birth: 2 April 1994 (age 32)
- Place of birth: Durban, South Africa
- Height: 1.81 m (5 ft 11 in)
- Position: Goalkeeper

Team information
- Current team: Mamelodi Sundowns
- Number: 20

Senior career*
Years	Team	Apps	(Gls)
2013–2017	Lamontville Golden Arrows	2	(0)
2017–2018	Real Kings	30	(0)
2018–2020	Bidvest Wits	24	(0)
2020–	Mamelodi Sundowns	2	(0)
2022–2026	→ SuperSport United (loan)	48	(0)

International career^{‡}
2015	South Africa U23	1	(0)
2020–	South Africa	5	(0)
Medal record
Representing South Africa
Men's football
Africa Cup of Nations
Third place	2023 Ivory Coast
- * Club domestic league appearances and goals as of 1 August 2024 ‡ National team caps and goals as of 6 October 2022

Stuart Ricardo Goss (born 2 April 1994) is a South African soccer player who plays as a goalkeeper for South African Premier Division club Mamelodi Sundowns and the South Africa national team.

Goss started his senior career Lamontville Golden Arrows and had spells at Real Kings and Bidvest Wits before joining Mamelodi Sundowns in 2020.

== Early and personal life ==
Goss was born in Durban and grew up in Chesterville. His mother Faith was a single mother and Ricardo has never met his father.

== Club career ==
=== Lamontville Golden Arrows ===
He made his debut for Lamontville Golden Arrows on 1 May 2013 in a 4–1 defeat to Moroka Swallows. Despite the 4–1 defeat, manager Manqoba Mngqithi was complimentary of Goss' performance, saying "To be honest, I was quite impressed with Ricardo on the day but the circumstances were not favouring him."

In total, he made just 2 league appearances for Golden Arrows before leaving the club in 2017.

=== Real Kings ===
In July 2017, he joined Real Kings on a two-year deal. He played all 30 league games for Real Kings in the National First Division across the 2017–18 season, as they finished fourth.

=== Bidvest Wits ===
Goss joined South African Premier Division side Bidvest Wits in August 2018. He appeared five times in the South African Premier Division across the 2018–19 season.

He received an eight-match ban in March 2020 for assaulting the referee in a 2–0 defeat to Cape Town City on 18 January 2020.

In total, he made 19 league appearances for Bidvest Wits across the 2019–20 season.

=== Mamelodi Sundowns ===
In September 2020, he joined Mamelodi Sundowns on a five-year contract. In response to signing for Mamelodi Sundowns, Goss said "It has been a childhood dream for me to join the club." It took until February 2021 for Goss to make his debut for the club, which came in a Nedbank Cup win against Stellenbosch, as Denis Onyango and Kennedy Mweene were often preferred by the manager. He failed to make a league appearance for Sundowns in the 2020–21 season, and played just twice in the 2021–22 season.

In July 2022, he joined SuperSport United on a two-year loan. In summer 2024, he returned to SuperSport on loan for a third season.

== International career ==
Goss has appeared for South Africa at under-23 level and for the senior national team.

He was called up to the senior national team for the first time in October 2019 for the Nelson Mandela Challenge match against Mali, and was recalled to the senior national team for 2021 Africa Cup of Nations qualification matches the following month. Goss said that he "was stunned" by the call-up and that he "didn't expect things to happen this fast", given he was playing in the second-tier National First Division two seasons prior.

On 1 December 2025, Goss was called up to the South Africa squad for the 2025 Africa Cup of Nations.

On 28 May 2026, he was selected by manager Hugo Broos to represent his nation at the 2026 FIFA World Cup due to his performance in the South African Premier Division.

== Honours ==
South Africa

- Africa Cup of Nations third place: 2023
