= Soka Afrika =

- Directed by: Suridh Das-Hassan
- Starring: Kayvan Novak
- Release dates: 2011
- Countries: United Kingdom, France, Cameroon, Spain, Egypt, Netherlands

Soka Afrika is a 2011 documentary film on the subject of African football trafficking.

The film follows three main characters: Kermit Romeo Erasmus, a young aspiring footballer from South Africa in a professional setup and playing for his national team; Ndomo Julien Sabo, a player from Cameroon who is trafficked at a young age to France; and Jean-Claude Mbvoumin, a former player also from Cameroon who helps kids that are abandoned in Europe by fake agents, through his NGO Foot Solidaire.

The film is directed by Suridh Hassan, co-directed by Ryo Sanada (both of The SRK) and produced by Simon Laub and Sam Potter (both of Masnomis Ltd).

The film has been shown in festivals worldwide. It has also been released as a DVD. It is 77 minutes long.

Sam Potter, the executive producer was interviewed in relation to the Raindance Film Festival, explains that the film is capturing the efforts that people go to in order to 'get out of Africa', using Football as a microcosm.
