= Fagrie Lakay =

South African soccer player (born 1997)

Personal information
- Full name: Fagrie Lakay
- Date of birth: 31 May 1997 (age 29)
- Place of birth: Manenberg, South Africa
- Height: 1.70 m (5 ft 7 in)
- Positions: Forward; winger

Team information
- Current team: Al Ahli Tripoli
- Number: 29

Youth career
- Real Stars
- Engen Santos

Senior career*
Years	Team	Apps	(Gls)
2012–2015	Santos	33	(3)
2015–2019	SuperSport United	25	(0)
2017–2018	→ Ajax Cape Town (loan)	14	(3)
2019–	→ Bidvest Wits (loan)	5	(0)
2019–2022	Cape Town City	57	(15)
2022–2025	Pyramids	120	(33)
2024–2025	→ Ceramica Cleopatra FC (loan)	28	(6)
2025–2026	Ceramica Cleopatra FC	24	(6)

International career
2012–	South Africa U17	5	(2)
2013–2016	South Africa U20	15	(3)
2014–	South Africa	6	(0)
- * Club domestic league appearances and goals

Fagrie Lakay (born 31 May 1997) is a South African soccer player who plays as a forward for the South Africa national team.

== Club career ==
He was born in Manenberg.

Lakay started playing soccer for Real Stars, a team that was owned by his father. He later saw an advert for Santos trials and his father took him there. Lakay made his debut for Santos in the National First Division on 20 October 2012 against FC Cape Town. He started and played the first half as Santos drew the match 0–0. He then scored his first career goal on 5 February 2014 against Maluti FET College in which his 39th-minute strike gave Santos a 2–0 lead. However, FET College came back to draw the game 2–2.

== International career ==
Lakay has played for South Africa at the under-17 and under-20 teams. Lakay scored in a training match for Santos against the senior national team's fringe players, beating under-20 teammate Dumisani Msibi in goal from 40m, ahead of South Africa's qualifier against Nigeria in Cape Town. He made his senior debut for South Africa on 30 November 2014 when the country took on the Ivory Coast. He came on as a 75th-minute substitute for Themba Zwane as South Africa won 2–0. By making his debut, Lakay at 17 years, 5 months, 30 days, broke the record set by Rivaldo Coetzee as the youngest ever player to wear the national jersey at 17 years, 11 months, 25 days. Coetzee also broke a long-standing record by former Bafana captain Aaron Mokoena who was 18 years, two months, 26 days in a clash against Botswana in 1999.

== Career statistics ==
As of 30 December 2021

Club	Season	League			National cup		League cup		International		Total	
Club	Season	Division	Apps	Goals	Apps	Goals	Apps	Goals	Apps	Goals	Apps	Goals
Santos	2012–13	National First Division	4	0	0	0	1	0	–		5	0
Santos	2013–14	National First Division	14	3	2	0	0	0	–		16	3
Santos	2014–15	National First Division	7	0	0	0	0	0	–		7	0
Career total			25	3	2	0	1	0	–		28	3
