= Football trafficking =

Human trafficking of football players

Football trafficking is the exploitation of young footballers in developing countries, particularly trafficking from South America and Africa into Europe and Asia. Human trafficking has been described as "quintessentially ... a part of football in Africa". Traffickers, representing themselves as "agents" of premier football leagues, prey on families desperate for a better life for their children, convincing the families to pay the traffickers "fees" to create the opportunity for the players to try out for European football teams, then absconding with the money and often leaving the young footballers stranded in Europe and other parts of the world. Agent fees in some places represent a family's entire savings. Some families sell their homes to raise the funds.

Claims of widespread trafficking have been disputed.

== Background ==
"Football migration" from Africa to Europe is not a new phenomenon and has existed since the 1930s. Young boys are also trafficked from South America. According to Dan Bullock of the Hollywood News, "quintessentially, human trafficking is a part of football in Africa". Traffickers, representing themselves as "agents" of premier football leagues, prey on families desperate for a better life for their children, convincing the families to pay the traffickers "fees" to create the opportunity to try out for European football teams, then absconding with the money and often leaving the young footballers stranded in Europe and other parts of the world. According to journalists Christophe Gleizes and Barthélémy Gaillard, typical agent "fees" in Mali while they were researching their 2018 book on the practice averaged 2000 to 3000 euros, which they describe as "someone's entire life savings". Some families sell their homes to raise the funds.

A 1995 court case in the European Court of Justice which abolished transfer fees for out-of-contract players created a necessity for clubs to recoup investments on players in the transfer market. This resulted in clubs searching for players outside the European Union where they could be signed for much lower fees.

As early as 2006 UEFA was identifying trafficking as an area of concern. In 2007 Sepp Blatter said European football clubs were engaging in 'despicable' behaviour and 'social and economic rape' in Africa and other developing areas. By 2008 The Observer was reporting on the estimated 500 "unlicensed football 'academies' of Accra, which [had] sprung up in response to the rising profile of African players in Europe"; thousands of academies proliferated in other parts of Ghana. According to The Observer, 90% of such academies they visited "were run by local men with limited experience of the game. Most described themselves as former footballers; but none was able to produce proof of his career." According to The Observer:

Coaches, as well as European and Arab middlemen, haggle over the best players, signing some as young as seven on tightly binding pre-contracts – effectively buying them from their families – with the hope of making thousands of dollars selling the boys on to clubs in Europe. In other cases, they extort the cost of passage from their families. Many take the deeds on houses and even family jewellery in return for their services.

Former Ghana captain Anthony Baffoe in 2008 said, "the trafficking of children to play football is a reality we must all face... There must be better control of illegal academies across Africa." According to 2008 estimates by The Observer, producing a single premier-league player once every five years would cover the operating costs for an academy.

The primary regions from where footballers are trafficked are North Africa and the coastal sub-Saharan west, which are areas with multiple legitimate football academies. Hopeful players illegally emigrate from other countries such as Nigeria because "No European scout is crazy enough to go to the slums of Lagos." Traffickers are aware that the players who have not been scouted by one of the legitimate academies are unlikely to be sufficiently skilled to play in premier leagues. In 2008 an estimated 750,000 players competed for 23 spots at legitimate Qatari football academy Aspire.

A former director of immigration at Zaventem airport in Brussels told The Independent that allegations of trafficking were "bullshit" claims made by illegal immigrants.

== Anti-trafficking efforts ==
Belgian anti-trafficking organization Fondation Samilia created the Football Against Trafficking campaign, which distributed flyers about football trafficking in Ivory Coast. By 2015 anti-trafficking activists were criticizing FIFA's certification of agents; in April 2015, FIFA allowed its until-then required licensing process to be replaced by local processes.

Cameroonian former professional football player Jean-Claude Mbvoumin operates Culture Foot Solidaire, a non-governmental organization (NGO) that helps stranded footballers and also seeks to raise awareness of the issue. The group estimates most fees paid to traffickers are between £2,000 and £6,500. Allegations have been made against Mbvoumin and his NGO that they have engaged in trafficking themselves. In 2015 FIFA held a conference on the issue, with Mbvoumin the keynote speaker. A few weeks later, a footballer accused Mbvoumin of representing himself as an agent. Mbvoumin denied the allegations, saying the payments made had been reimbursements for expenses.

== Documentaries and books ==
"Soccer's Lost Boys" is an episode of American television documentary series Vanguard. It investigated the trafficking of local football standouts and the black market football games of Paris. According to Mariana van Zeller, in 2011 there were an estimated 20,000 West African football players stranded in Europe by this trafficking. According to The Guardian, "tens of thousands" of footballers have been trafficked and in 2017 over 100 from Benin, Burkina Faso, Guinea, Ivory Coast, Mali and Togo had been trafficked to Nepal alone. According to Geographical, as many as 15,000 players may be trafficked into Europe every year.

Soka Afrika is a 2011 full-length documentary about the subject.

A 2018 book by investigative journalists Gaillard and Gleizes, Magique système: L'esclavage moderne des footballeurs africains (Magic system: African footballers and the modern slave trade), documented the practice in West and Central Africa and also the small clubs around Paris.

Investigative journalist Frédéric Loore and photojournalist Roger Job documented the practice in West Africa and Belgium, first in a 2011 article in Paris Match, 'Les Damnes du foot' (The damned of football) and then in a 2014 book, Marque ou creve (Score or die).
