= Lebohang Maboe =

South African soccer player

Lebohang Kgosana Maboe
Personal information
- Full name: Lebohang Kgosana Maboe
- Date of birth: 17 September 1994 (age 32)
- Place of birth: Heidelberg, Gauteng, South Africa
- Height: 1.72 m (5 ft 8 in)
- Positions: Attacking midfielder; forward

Team information
- Current team: Kaizer Chiefs
- Number: 6

Senior career*
Years	Team	Apps	(Gls)
2015–2016	Mbombela United	27	(3)
2016–2018	Maritzburg United	53	(5)
2018–2025	Mamelodi Sundowns	183	(20)
2025	→ SuperSport United (loan)	13	(0)
2025–	Kaizer Chiefs	12	(0)

International career^{‡}
2017–2021	South Africa	17	(3)
- * Club domestic league appearances and goals as of 19:43, 12 April 2026 (UTC) ‡ National team caps and goals as of 19:20, 29 January 2025 (UTC)

Lebohang Kgosana Maboe (born 17 September 1994) is a South African professional soccer player who plays as an attacking midfielder or forward for South African Premiership club Kaizer Chiefs. He is the son of former Moroka Swallows and Orlando Pirates player Sidwell Maboe.

== Club career ==
=== Early career ===
Maboe began playing football in his home town of Heidelberg where he played with amateur side Ratanda Real Hearts. During his time with Hearts, he was promoted to the club's under-17 side at the age of 14 where his performances at age-group level earned him the opportunity to later join the Kaizer Chiefs academy.

=== Mbombela United ===
In 2015, Maboe signed for National First Division side Mbombela United where he spent a solitary season. He recorded a return of 3 goals in 27 league appearances to help the club reach the PSL play-offs where they were defeated by Highlands Park. Maboe would advance to the Premiership, however, as at the conclusion of the season he was signed by top-flight side, Maritzburg United.

=== Maritzburg United ===
Maboe officially joined Maritzburg United in July 2016 where he initially joined up with the club's reserve side. He was then promoted to the first team by coach Ernst Middendorp who handed him his debut in October against Free State Stars. He faced challenging circumstances at the club following Middendorp and his replacement Roger de Sa's respective resignations, but nonetheless enjoyed a strong debut season. During the latter parts of the campaign he played in every match under new coach Fadlu Davids and recorded 3 goals in 22 appearances in total.

Maboe's form continued to improve the following season, particularly in the Nedbank Cup where he helped the club to a runners-up finish against Free State Stars. His performances in the tournament earned him the Player of the Tournament and Most Promising Player awards. However, at the end of the season, and with Maritzburg United facing financial difficulties, he was sold to league rivals, Mamelodi Sundowns.

=== Mamelodi Sundowns ===
On the opening day of the season, Maboe was handed his debut off the bench by Pitso Mosimane in a 1–1 draw with Kaizer Chiefs. In the next match, he scored his first goal for the club in a 2–0 win over Polokwane City. He ultimately scored nine goals and recorded eight assists as Sundowns retained the Premiership title.

He joined SuperSport United on a loan until the end of the season from Mamelodi Sundowns on 29 January 2025.

=== Kaizer Chiefs ===
He signed for Kaizer Chiefs on a free transfer in August 2025.

== International career ==
=== South Africa ===
Following his success with Maritzburg United, Maboe received his first international call-up to the senior national team ahead of the 2017 COSAFA Cup. The following year, he returned for the 2018 edition of the competition where he scored three goals in two appearances as South Africa went on to lift the Plate title; equivalent of a fifth-placed finish.

== Personal life ==
He is the son of former footballer Sidwell Maboe, who played as a striker for Orlando Pirates, amongst other clubs.

== Career statistics ==
=== International ===
As of 4 June 2019

National team	Year	Apps	Goals
South Africa	2017	2	0
South Africa	2018	6	3
South Africa	2019	1 (Note: South Africa's match against Ghana on 15 June 2019 is not recognized as an official match by FIFA.)	0
Total		9	3

== Honours and awards ==
Club

Mamelodi Sundowns

- South African Premiership: 2018–19, 2019-20
- Nedbank Cup: 2019-20
- Telkom Knockout: 2019

Individual

- Nedbank Cup Player of the Tournament: 2018
- Nedbank Cup Most Promising Player: 2018
