= Reyaad Pieterse =

South African soccer player

Personal information
- Date of birth: 17 February 1992 (age 34)
- Place of birth: Johannesburg, South Africa
- Height: 1.91 m (6 ft 3 in)
- Position: Goalkeeper

Team information
- Current team: Mamelodi Sundowns
- Number: 30

Youth career
- Bidvest Wits
- Nike Football Academy

Senior career*
Years	Team	Apps	(Gls)
2012	Shamrock Rovers	1	(0)
2013– 2016	Kaizer Chiefs	24	(0)
2016–2018	Supersport United	30	(0)
2018–	Mamelodi Sundowns	12	(0)

International career^{‡}
2016–2019	South Africa	7	(0)
- * Club domestic league appearances and goals as of 30 June 2024 ‡ National team caps and goals as of 7 October 2022

Reyaad Pieterse (born 17 February 1992) is a South African professional soccer player who plays as a goalkeeper for Premier Soccer League side Mamelodi Sundowns. He was capped seven times for the South Africa national soccer team.

== Club career ==
=== Shamrock Rovers ===
Reyaad played for Bidvest Wits in his native South Africa and was spotted by Shamrock Rovers while playing for the Nike Football Academy in Loughborough. He signed for Stephen Kenny at Rovers in April 2012 and made his senior debut for the Hoops against SD Galway in the League of Ireland Cup on 9 April. A week later he made his home debut at Tallaght Stadium against Derry City in the Setanta Sports Cup. However he was sent off in this semi final clash.

Reyaad made his league debut for Rovers at Sligo Rovers on 12 May, but that would be his only league appearance of the season as he was kept on the bench by Oscar Jansson. In September he won the Leinster Senior Cup.

He left the Hoops at the end of the 2012 League of Ireland season.

=== Kaizer Chiefs ===
In January 2013, Pieterse returned to South Africa to sign for Kaizer Chiefs. He made his debut on 27 November 2013 in a 4-1 win over Polokwane City after coming in for Itumeleng Khune who collected a hamstring niggle. Pieterse had to be substituted during Chiefs’ 2-0 win over AS Vita on 29 March as Chiefs were knocked out of the CAF Champions League after a 3-2 aggregate defeat when Pieterse sustained an injury to his eye after colliding with the post. A statement from their medical team on the club's official website said, "Reyaad had a laceration to his left eyelid after a collision with the upright. It had to be stitched field side, no fracture was found on Reyaad, we have to wait for the swelling to subside so that he can open his eye again,"

== Honours ==
Shamrock Rovers

- Leinster Senior Cup – 2012

Kaizer Chiefs

- Premier Soccer League – 12/13, 14/15
- Nedbank Cup – 2012–13 Nedbank Cup
- MTN 8 - 2014 MTN 8

SuperSport United F.C.

- Nedbank Cup - 2016–17 Nedbank Cup
- MTN 8 - 2017 MTN 8

Mamelodi Sundowns F.C.

- Premier Soccer League (7) - 18/19, 19/20, 20/21, 21/22, 22/23, 23/24, 24/25
- Nedbank Cup (2) - 2019–20 Nedbank Cup, 2021–22 Nedbank Cup
- Telkom Knockout (1) - 2019 Telkom Knockout
- MTN 8 (2) - 2021 MTN 8, 2026 MTN 8
- CAF Champions League (1) - 2025–26
- African Football League (1) - 2023
- FIFA African-Asian-Pacific Cup (1) - 2026
