= Promise Mkhuma =

South African footballer

Personal information
- Full name: Promise Lebo Mkhuma
- Date of birth: 24 May 2000 (age 26)
- Place of birth: Tshwane, Gauteng, South Africa
- Height: 1.63 m (5 ft 4 in)
- Position: Forward

Team information
- Current team: All Stars (loan from Mamelodi Sundowns)

Youth career
- –2020: Mamelodi Sundowns

Senior career*
Years	Team	Apps	(Gls)
2020–	Mamelodi Sundowns	16	(0)
2022	→ Moroka Swallows (loan)	0	(0)
2023–	→ All Stars (loan)	12	(2)

International career^{‡}
2019	South Africa U20	8	(0)
- * Club domestic league appearances and goals as of 11 June 2023 ‡ National team caps and goals as of 27 August 2020

Promise Lebo Mkhuma (born 24 May 2000) is a South African professional soccer player who plays as a forward for All Stars on loan from Mamelodi Sundowns.
