= Zama Dlamini =

South African soccer player

Personal information
- Full name: Zama Happy Dlamini
- Date of birth: 12 December 1991 (age 34)
- Place of birth: Secunda, South Africa
- Position: Goalkeeper

Team information
- Current team: Kruger United

Youth career
- 2012: Trieste

Senior career*
Years	Team	Apps	(Gls)
2012–2013	Black Aces	0	(0)
2013–2014	Thanda Royal Zulu	11	(0)
2014	Mamelodi Sundowns	0	(0)
2014	→ Royal Eagles (loan)		
2015–2016	Witbank Spurs	32	(0)
2016–2018	Chippa United	2	(0)
2018	→ Highlands Park (loan)		
2018–2019	Baroka	0	(0)
2019	Real Kings	2	(0)
2019–2020	Royal Eagles	16	(0)
2021–2024	Cape Town Spurs	24	(0)
2024–	Kruger United	1	(0)
- * Club domestic league appearances and goals as of 10 September 2024

Zama Dlamini (born 12 December 1991) is a goalkeeper who plays for Kruger United.
