= Pogiso Sanoka =

South African soccer player

Personal information
- Date of birth: 4 June 1992 (age 34)
- Position: Defender

Team information
- Current team: SuperSport United
- Number: 4

Senior career*
Years	Team	Apps	(Gls)
–2014	Orbit College		
2015–2021	Maritzburg United	96	(5)
2021–2024	TS Galaxy	89	(1)
2024–	SuperSport United	0	(0)
- * Club domestic league appearances and goals as of 1 August 2024

Pogiso Sanoka (born 4 June 1992) is a South African soccer player who plays as a defender for South African Premier Division side SuperSport United.

== Club career ==
Having previously played for Orbit College in the SAFA Second Division, Sanoka joined Maritzburg United in 2015 after a trial spell.
