= Gregory Roelf =

South African soccer player (born 1988)

Personal information
- Date of birth: 15 December 1988 (age 37)
- Height: 1.80 m (5 ft 11 in)
- Position: Forward

Youth career
- Island Rovers
- Santos

Senior career*
Years	Team	Apps	(Gls)
–2010	→ Mitchells Plain United (loan)		
2010–2015	Santos	60	(7)
2015–2017	Milano United	51	(14)
2017–2018	Richards Bay	21	(4)
2018–2019	The Magic		
2019	Stellenbosch	9	(2)
2019–2020	Cape Umoya United	17	(1)
2020–2021	Steenberg United	15	(3)
2022–2023	Platinum City Rovers	5	(0)
2023–2024	NB La Masia	32	(3)
- * Club domestic league appearances and goals as of 13 February 2025

Gregory Roelf (born 15 December 1988) is a South African soccer player who played as a forward for Santos in the South African Premier Division and seven clubs on the second tier.

== Career ==
Born 15 December 1988, he grew up in Elsie's River. He joined the Island Rovers in Bishop Lavis at age 12. After progressing to the U17 team of Santos, he played youth soccer there and was also loaned out to the feeder team Mitchells Plain United. Roelf made his first-tier debut in the 2010–11 South African Premier Division for Santos.

Roelf gradually fell out of favour at Santos, and only scored one goal in the 2014–15 season. When his contract expired at Santos, he desired to move on, opting to reunite with his former manager Boebie Solomons at Milano United. Roelf's goalscoring form at Milano United was rather good, vying for double digits in both 2015–16 and 2016–17. Still, Milano United only finished 14th in the second tier in 2017, and released several players, among them Roelf.

Roelf first featured for Richards Bay, joining in 2017. He went down to the third tier and The Magic before being acquired by Stellenbosch in the January 2019 transfer window. With Stellenbosch, he won the 2018–19 National First Division, but was not a part of Stellenbosch' Premier Division plans and instead joined Cape Umoya United. Roelf continued to Steenberg United as he passed the decade mark in his soccer career.

== Honours ==
Santos

- IFA Shield runner-up: 2008
