= Matome Mathiane =

South African soccer player

Personal information
- Full name: Matome Trevor Mathiane
- Date of birth: 21 October 1988 (age 38)
- Place of birth: Limpopo, South Africa
- Height: 1.81 m (5 ft 11 1/2 in)
- Position: Defender

Team information
- Current team: Marumo Gallants
- Number: 25

Senior career*
Years	Team	Apps	(Gls)
2013–2022	Lamontville Golden Arrows	114	(1)
2022–2023	Chippa United	22	(1)
2023–2024	Baroka	30	(2)
2024–	Marumo Gallants	3	(0)
- * Club domestic league appearances and goals as of 18 November 2024

Matome Trevor Mathiane (born 21 October 1988) is a South African soccer player who plays as a defender for Marumo Gallants. He spent most of his career with the Lamontville Golden Arrows in the South African Premier Division. He was the Arrows' captain.
