= Luckyboy Mokoena =

South African soccer player

Personal information
- Date of birth: 12 December 1993 (age 32)
- Position: Defender

Youth career
- Mpumalanga Black Aces
- Kaizer Chiefs
- Bidvest Wits

Senior career*
Years	Team	Apps	(Gls)
2012–2013	Mpumalanga Black Aces	9	(0)
2013–2014	Chippa United	2	(0)
2014–2015	Garankuwa United	25	(1)
2015–2016	Ubuntu Cape Town	12	(0)
2016–2018	Real Kings	40	(1)
2018–2020	Highlands Park	71	(2)
2020–2022	TS Galaxy	20	(0)
2022	Sekhukhune United	0	(0)

International career^{‡}
- South Africa U20
- * Club domestic league appearances and goals as of 15 November 2022 ‡ National team caps and goals as of 31 July 2020

Luckyboy Mokoena (born 12 December 1993) is a South African former soccer player who plays as a defender.

== Club career ==
Mokoena played youth football with Mpumalanga Black Aces, Kaizer Chiefs and Bidvest Wits, before playing senior football for Mpumalanga Black Aces, Chippa United, Garankuwa United, Ubuntu Cape Town, Real Kings and Highlands Park.

== International career ==
Mokoena has previously played for South Africa at under-20 level. In 2019, he was called up to the South Africa national football team.
