= Denis Onyango =

Ugandan footballer (born 1985)

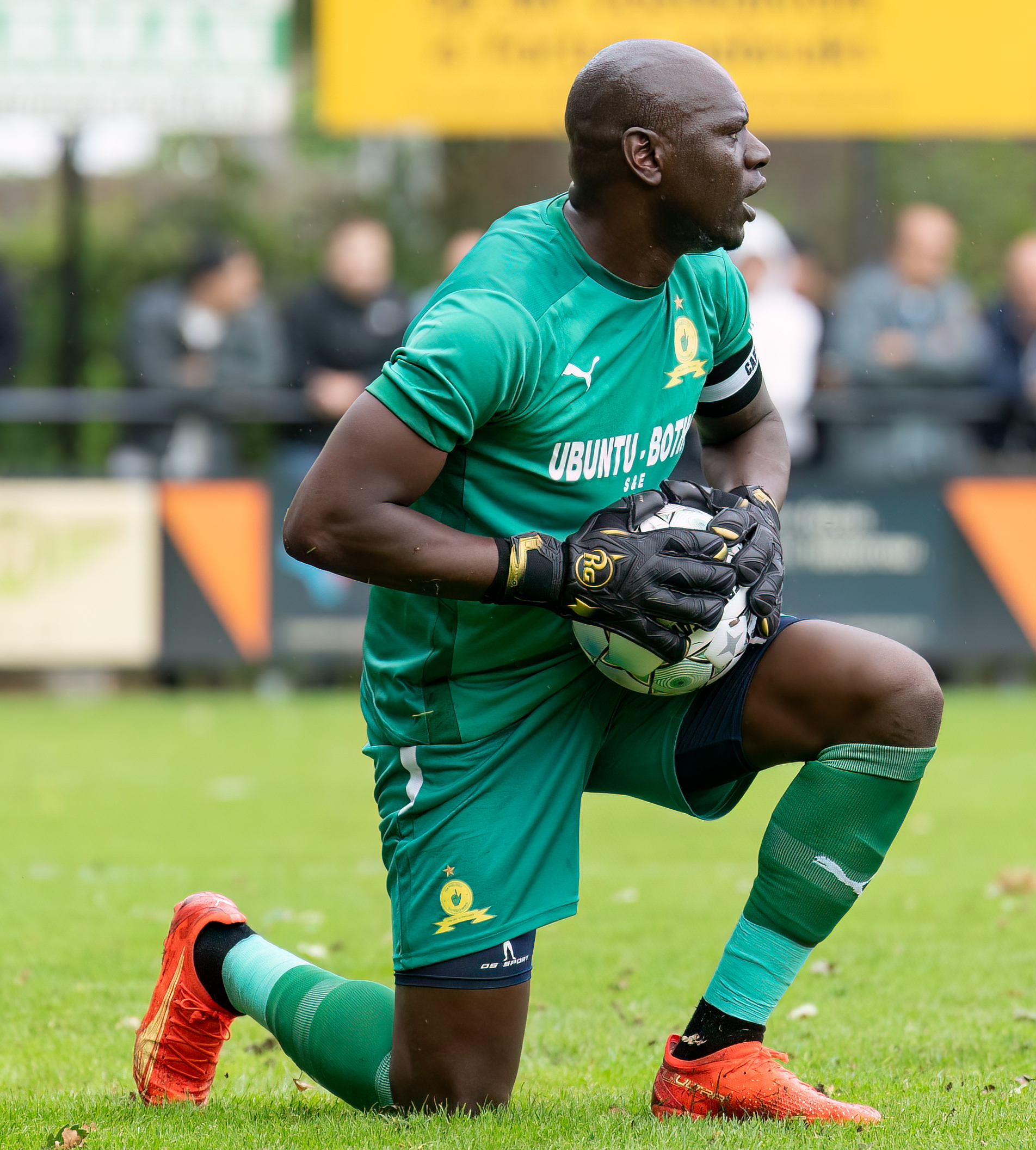
- Onyango in 2023

Personal information
- Full name: Denis Masinde Onyango
- Date of birth: 15 May 1985 (age 41)
- Place of birth: Kampala, Uganda
- Height: 1.86 m (6 ft 1 in)
- Position: Goalkeeper

Team information
- Current team: Mamelodi Sundowns
- Number: 1

Youth career
- Sharing
- Nsambya
- SC Villa

Senior career*
Years	Team	Apps	(Gls)
2004–2005	SC Villa		
2005–2006	Saint George		
2006–2010	SuperSport United	70	(1)
2010–2011	Mpumalanga Black Aces	1	(0)
2011–	Mamelodi Sundowns	176	(0)
2013–2014	→ Bidvest Wits (loan)	4	(0)

International career^{‡}
2005–	Uganda	83	(0)
- * Club domestic league appearances and goals as of 3 January 2026 ‡ National team caps and goals as of 20:00, 9 October 2025 (UTC)

Denis Masinde Onyango (born 15 May 1985) is a Ugandan professional footballer who plays as a goalkeeper for South African Premier Soccer League club Mamelodi Sundowns and the Uganda national team.

Having begun his career in his native country, Onyango went on to play in the South African Premier Soccer League with Supersport United, Mpumalanga Black Aces, and Mamelodi Sundowns. With Mamelodi Sundowns, he won the 2016 CAF Champions League and took part in the 2016 FIFA Club World Cup. He was named the 2016 African-based African Player of the year. He was also ranked as the tenth best goalkeeper in the world in the list for 2016, compiled by the International Federation of Football History & Statistics.

He represented Uganda at the 2017 and 2019 Africa Cup of Nations, and captained them until his international retirement in 2021. After four years in retirement, Onyango returned to the national team in August 2025 as Uganda prepared for the 2026 FIFA World Cup qualifiers games against Mozambique and Somalia.

== Club career ==
=== Early career ===
Born in Kampala, Uganda, Onyango began his career with SC Villa in Kampala and later joined St. George SA in Ethiopia.

=== SuperSport United and Mpumalanga Black Aces ===
In 2006, Onyango joined South African Premier Soccer League side Supersport United.

On 8 July 2010, he was released by SuperSport United.

On 26 July, Mpumalanga Black Aces signed free agent Onyango.

=== Mamelodi Sundowns ===
In 2011, Onyango joined South African Premier Soccer League club Mamelodi Sundowns.

On 2 August 2013, he made a loan move to league rivals Bidvest Wits.

In July 2014 Mamelodi Sundowns exercised their option to extend Onyango's contract by a year.

Onyango won the PSL Goalkeeper of the Season award (best player in the South African top division) in the 2015–16 season and kept 14 clean sheets as Sundowns earned a record 71 points.

The Uganda Sports Press Associations voted Onyango as the best sports personality in the month of October 2016 in Uganda.

On 5 January 2017, he was voted the 2016 African-based African Player of the year at the CAF Awards held in Nigeria. The final tally saw him pick up 252 votes, compared to 228 votes for second place Khama Billiat.

== International career ==
Onyango made his international debut for Uganda on 18 June 2005 World Cup qualifying match against Cape Verde. From then Onyango became a regular for the Cranes.

Onyango helped the Cranes qualify for the 2017 Africa Cup of Nations by conceding only two goals in six matches in their qualifying group. He made his first appearance at the Africa Cup of Nations in the 31st edition that was hosted by Gabon from 14 January 2017 to 5 February 2017.

He became captain of the national team in April 2017. On 12 April 2021, Onyango announced his international retirement, after Uganda failed to qualify for the 2021 Africa Cup of Nations. He was part of the goal keeping technical team for Uganda's national team when Kenya, Tanzania and Uganda co-hosted the 2024 CHAN games. Onyango from Uganda, Mrisho Ngasa from Tanzania together with Victor Wanyama from Kenya were selected by CAF to unveil the trophy to be won. Despite all hosts emerging on top of their groups, they were knocked out on the Quarter finals.

On December 7, 2025, he was selected by Paul Put for Uganda's squad to participate in the 2025 Africa Cup of Nations.

== Style of play ==
Onyango is known for his penalty-saving and his play in one-on-one situations. He is all round, very consistent and calm as described by Mark Anderson, a former Sundowns goalkeeper coach.

== Personal life ==
Onyango is the second son and third child of Mzee Gabriel (1952–2019) and Nakato Musoke Olive Onyango. He is married to Barbara Namubiru and the couple have four sons.

== Career statistics ==
Appearances and goals by national team and year
National team	Year	Apps	Goals
Uganda	2005	2	0
Uganda	2006	2	0
Uganda	2007	4	0
Uganda	2008	6	0
Uganda	2009	1	0
Uganda	2010	3	0
Uganda	2011	6	0
Uganda	2012	6	0
Uganda	2013	3	0
Uganda	2014	10	0
Uganda	2015	6	0
Uganda	2016	5	0
Uganda	2017	8	0
Uganda	2018	7	0
Uganda	2019	9	0
Uganda	2020	2	0
Uganda	2021	2	0
Total		82	0

== Honours ==
Super Sport United

- Premier Soccer League: 2007–08, 2008–09, 2009–10

Mamelodi Sundowns

- Premier Soccer League: 2015–16, 2017–18, 2018–19, 2019–20, 2020–21, 2021–22, 2022–23, 2023–24, 2024–25
- Nedbank Cup: 2014–15, 2019–20, 2021–22
- Telkom Knockout: 2015, 2019
- MTN 8: 2021, 2026
- CAF Champions League: 2016, 2025–26
- CAF Super Cup: 2017
- African Football League: 2023

Individual

- African-based African Player of the year: 2016
- CAF Team of the Year: 2016, 2018
