= Lesedi Kapinga =

South African footballer

Personal information
- Full name: Lesedi Alton Kapinga
- Date of birth: 25 May 1995 (age 31)
- Place of birth: Musina Nancefield
- Position: Midfielder

Team information
- Current team: Orbit College

Senior career*
Years	Team	Apps	(Gls)
2017–2018	Tshakhuma Tsha Madzivhandila	21	(1)
2018–2020	Black Leopards	45	(6)
2020–2023	Mamelodi Sundowns	25	(1)
2023–2024	Orlando Pirates	8	(0)
2024–2025	Sekhukhune United	11	(1)
2026–	Orbit College	3	(1)

International career^{‡}
2023–	South Africa	4	(0)
- * Club domestic league appearances and goals as of 9 February 2025 ‡ National team caps and goals as of 14 March 2026

Lesedi Alton Kapinga (born 25 May 1995) is a South African professional soccer player who plays as a midfielder for South African Premier Division side Orbit College.

== Career ==
Having started his senior career at Tshakhuma Tsha Madzivhandila, he joined Black Leopards in the summer of 2018. His performances in the 2019–20 season attracted praise and interest from larger clubs. In the summer of 2020, Kapinga joined Mamelodi Sundowns on a five-year deal.

Kapinga was called up for South Africa for the 2023 COSAFA Cup, where he made his international debut. He moved from Orlando Pirates to Sekhukhune United in October 2024.

== Personal life ==
Kapinga is a cousin of the late Orlando Pirates striker Lesley Manyathela. He is from Limpopo province, a town called Musina. He is a former teammate with his hometown friend Khuliso Mudau during his short spell at Mamelodi Sundowns. He was released on a free transfer in 2022, and joined Orlando Pirates.

== Career statistics ==
As of 4 July 2020

Appearances and goals by club, season and competition
Club	Season	League			Nedbank Cup		Telkom Knockout		Other		Total	
Club	Season	Division	Apps	Goals	Apps	Goals	Apps	Goals	Apps	Goals	Apps	Goals
Tshakhuma Tsha Madzivhandila	2017–18	National First Division	21	1	1	0	0	0	0	0	22	1
Black Leopards	2018–19	Premier Division	21	1	2	0	1	0	0	0	24	1
Black Leopards	2019–20	Premier Division	24	5	2	1	1	0	0	0	27	6
Black Leopards	Total		45	6	4	1	2	0	0	0	51	7
Career total			66	7	5	1	2	0	0	0	73	8
