= Lyle Lakay =

South African soccer player (born 1991)

Personal information
- Date of birth: 17 August 1991 (age 35)
- Place of birth: Cape Town, South Africa
- Height: 1.80 m (5 ft 11 in)
- Position: Left winger

Team information
- Current team: HOPE FC
- Number: 7

Youth career
- Stephanians Ottery
- Hellenic FC
- Old Mutual Academy
- –2009: SuperSport United

Senior career*
Years	Team	Apps	(Gls)
2009–2012	SuperSport United	14	(0)
2009–2010	→ Cape Town (loan)		
2011–2012	→ Cape Town (loan)		
2012–2017	Bloemfontein Celtic	93	(8)
2017–2018	Cape Town City	28	(2)
2018–2023	Mamelodi Sundowns	103	(8)
2022–2023	→ Cape Town City (loan)	18	(0)
2023–2024	SuperSport United	28	(4)

International career^{‡}
2011	South Africa U20	3	(0)
2015–	South Africa	11	(1)
- * Club domestic league appearances and goals as of 1 August 2024 ‡ National team caps and goals as of 16 November 2023

Lyle Lakay (born 17 August 1991) is a South African professional soccer player who plays a midfielder for Hope FC in the National First Division

== Club career ==
Lakay is a product of the SuperSport United's youth academy, he was promoted to the first team in 2009 but spent the 2009–10 season with National First Division side Cape Town. For the 2010–11 season he returned to Supersport United. After another loan spell with FC Cape Town, Lakay joined Bloemfontein Celtic in 2012. He is expected to sign for the big spending Pretoria side, Mamelodi Sundowns FC during the January transfer window 2014. On 14 November 2013, the player was quoted to have said, "Yes, I arrived today in Tshwane, but I will start training with Sundowns tomorrow (Friday). I hope everything will go well."

In 2023, he returned to his former club SuperSport United for free.

== International career ==
In 2011, he was called up to the South Africa U-20 team for the 2011 African Youth Championship.
