= Vusi Sibiya =

South African soccer player

Personal information
- Full name: Vusi Tshepo Sibiya
- Date of birth: 14 June 1994 (age 32)
- Place of birth: Soshanguve, South Africa
- Height: 1.94 m (6 ft 4 in)
- Position: Defender

Team information
- Current team: Marumo Gallants
- Number: 24

Senior career*
Years	Team	Apps	(Gls)
–2018	Tshwane University of Technology		
2018–2022	Baroka	62	(1)
2022–2023	Stellenbosch	20	(0)
2023–2024	Moroka Swallows	17	(0)
2024–	Marumo Gallants	2	(0)

International career^{‡}
2021	South Africa	1	(0)
- * Club domestic league appearances and goals as of 18 November 2024 ‡ National team caps and goals as of 18 November 2024

Vusi Tshepo Sibiya (born 14 June 1994) is a South African soccer player who plays as a defender for South African Premier Division side Marumo Gallants.

== Club career ==
Born in Soshanguve, Sibiya signed for Baroka in 2018 after playing for Tshwane University of Technology.

== International career ==
He made his debut for South Africa national soccer team on 14 July 2021 in a 2021 COSAFA Cup game against Zambia. South Africa won the tournament, with Sibiya's only appearance coming against Zambia.
