= Sibusiso Khumalo (soccer, born 1991) =

South African footballer

Personal information
- Full name: Sibusiso Khumalo
- Date of birth: 8 March 1991 (age 35)
- Place of birth: Katlehong, South Africa
- Height: 1.72 m (5 ft 7 1/2 in)
- Position: Midfielder

Team information
- Current team: Marumo Gallants
- Number: 30

Youth career
- Moroka Swallows

Senior career*
Years	Team	Apps	(Gls)
2011–2013	Moroka Swallows	21	(0)
2013–2019	Mamelodi Sundowns	3	(0)
2014–2015	→ Maritzburg United (loan)	3	(0)
2016	→ Jomo Cosmos (loan)	13	(0)
2018–2019	→ Bidvest Wits (loan)	0	(0)
–2021	→ Futuro Kings		
2021–2024	Marumo Gallants	30	(2)

International career^{‡}
2017–2019	South Africa	2	(0)
- * Club domestic league appearances and goals as of 1 May 2023 ‡ National team caps and goals as of 13 November 2022

Sibusiso Khumalo (born 8 March 1991) is a South African soccer player who plays as a midfielder.

== Career ==
He is a product of the Swallows youth system. Kumalo was promoted to the first team in the 2010–11 season and became a regular feature for the first team squad, being used mostly as a substitute.

As of March 2019, Khumalo remained with the Sundowns team. However, he was released in September 2019.
