= 2019–20 South African Premiership =

Premiership
- Season: 2019–20
- Dates: 3 August 2019 – 5 September 2020
- Country: (South Africa) (16 teams)
- Champions: Mamelodi Sundowns (10th title)
- Relegated: Polokwane City
- Champions League: Mamelodi Sundowns; Kaizer Chiefs
- Confederation Cup: Orlando Pirates; Bloemfontein Celtic
- Matches: 240
- Goals: 508 (2.12 per match)
- Top goalscorer: Gabadinho Mhango; Peter Shalulile (16 goals each)
- Biggest home win: Bloemfontein Celtic 5–0 Lamontville Golden Arrows
- Biggest away win: Stellenbosch 0–4 Kaizer Chiefs (27 November 2019)
- Highest scoring: Cape Town City 5–3 Polokwane City (6 November 2019); Kaizer Chiefs 5–3 Bloemfontein Celtic
- Longest winning run: (8 games) Kaizer Chiefs
- Longest unbeaten run: (10 games) Orlando Pirates
- Longest winless run: (10 games) Chippa United
- Longest losing run: (9 games) Polokwane City
- Highest attendance: 80,808; Kaizer Chiefs 3–2 Orlando Pirates; 88,000; Orlando Pirates 0–1 Kaizer Chiefs (29 February 2020)
- Total attendance: 1,392,892
- Average attendance: 7,570
- All statistics correct as of 5 September 2020.

The 2019–20 South African Premiership season (known as the ABSA Premiership for sponsorship reasons, and also commonly referred to as the PSL after the governing body) was the 24th season of the Premiership since its establishment in 1996. The season began in August 2019 and concluded in September 2020. Mamelodi Sundowns were the two-time defending champions. This season's winner will qualify for the 2020–21 CAF Champions League along with the second-placed team. The 3rd placed team and Nedbank Cup winners qualify for the CAF Confederation Cup.

The season was postponed due to the COVID-19 pandemic. It resumed on 11 August 2020 after more than three months of suspension. Mamelodi Sundowns won the title in the last day of the competition, they beat Kaizer Chiefs who were leading for more than half of the season. Mamelodi Sundowns won their third consecutive title and their 10th title overall. This was the last season sponsored by ABSA.

== Team changes ==
The following teams have changed division since the 2018–19 season.

=== To National First Division ===
Relegated from 2018–19 South African Premier Division

- Free State Stars

=== From National First Division ===
Promoted to 2019–20 Premiership

- Stellenbosch

== Teams ==
=== Stadium and locations ===
Location of teams in the 2019–20 PSL.

Team	Location	Stadium	Capacity
AmaZulu	Durban (Durban North)	King Goodwill Zwelithini Stadium	10,000
Baroka	Polokwane	Peter Mokaba Stadium	45,500
Black Leopards	Thohoyandou	Thohoyandou Stadium	40,000
Bloemfontein Celtic	Bloemfontein	Dr. Petrus Molemela Stadium	22,000
Cape Town City	Cape Town (Green Point)	Cape Town Stadium	55,000
Chippa United	Port Elizabeth	Nelson Mandela Bay Stadium	48,459
Lamontville Golden Arrows	Durban(Lamontville)	Princess Magogo Stadium	12,000
Highlands Park	Johannesburg (Tembisa)	Makhulong Stadium	13,500
Kaizer Chiefs	Johannesburg (Soweto)	FNB Stadium	94,736
Mamelodi Sundowns	Pretoria (Marabastad)	Loftus Versfeld Stadium	51,762
Maritzburg United	Pietermaritzburg	Harry Gwala Stadium	12,000
Orlando Pirates	Johannesburg (Soweto)	Orlando Stadium	37,139
Polokwane City	Polokwane	Peter Mokaba Stadium	45,500
Stellenbosch	Stellenbosch	Coetzenburg Stadium	8,000
SuperSport United	Pretoria	Lucas Masterpieces Moripe Stadium	28,900
Bidvest Wits	Johannesburg (Braamfontein)	Bidvest Stadium	5,000

=== Number of teams by province ===
Position	Province	Number	Teams
1	Gauteng	6	Orlando Pirates, Kaizer Chiefs, Mamelodi Sundowns, SuperSport United, Bidvest Wits and Highlands Park
2	KwaZulu-Natal	3	Maritzburg United, Lamontville Golden Arrows and AmaZulu
2	Limpopo	3	Polokwane City, Baroka and Black Leopards
3	Western Cape	2	Cape Town City and Stellenbosch
4	Free State	1	Bloemfontein Celtic
5	Eastern Cape	1	Chippa United

== League table ==
Pos	Team	Pld	W	D	L	GF	GA	GD	Pts	Qualification or relegation
1	Mamelodi Sundowns (C)	30	17	8	5	42	22	+20	59	Qualification for Champions League
2	Kaizer Chiefs	30	17	6	7	48	27	+21	57	Qualification for Champions League
3	Orlando Pirates	30	14	10	6	40	29	+11	52	Qualification for Confederation Cup
4	Bidvest Wits	30	14	10	6	33	22	+11	52	
5	SuperSport United	30	14	8	8	43	26	+17	50	
6	Cape Town City	30	11	9	10	40	37	+3	42	
7	Maritzburg United	30	10	12	8	29	27	+2	42	
8	Bloemfontein Celtic	30	9	12	9	43	39	+4	39	
9	Highlands Park	30	9	12	9	31	35	−4	39	
10	Stellenbosch	30	9	9	12	26	34	−8	36	
11	Chippa United	30	8	10	12	18	26	−8	34	
12	Golden Arrows	30	8	10	12	23	35	−12	34	
13	AmaZulu	30	7	9	14	20	33	−13	30	
14	Baroka	30	7	8	15	19	28	−9	29	
15	Black Leopards (O)	30	8	5	17	27	44	−17	29	Qualification for Playoff Tournament
16	Polokwane City (R)	30	7	4	19	25	43	−18	25	Relegation to National First Division

Updated to match(es) played on 2 July 2020. Source: Premier Soccer League
Rules for classification: 1) Points; 2) Goal difference; 3) Goals scored; 4) Head-to-head points; 5) Head-to-Head goal difference; 6) Head-to-Head goals scored; 7) Playoff; 8) Relegated (R); 9) Qualified to the next round (T)
(O) Play-off winners

== Results ==
Home \ Away	AMA	BAR	BVW	BLC	BLP	CTC	CPU	GDA	HLP	KZC	MDS	MAR	ORL	PLK	SSU	STU
AmaZulu	—	0–0	0–1	2–2	1–0	2–1	0–2		1–1	0–2	0–3	0–0	0–0		0–2	2–0
Baroka	0–1	—		0–0	2–0	2–2	0–1	0–1	1–2	1–1	0–0	2–1	2–2	1–0	0–2	0–1
Bidvest Wits	2–1	0–1	—	3–2	1–0	2–0	0–0	0–0		1–0	1–1		4–3	3–1	0–1	2–1
Bloemfontein Celtic		2–1	1–1	—	4–2	0–0		5–0	3–1	3–1	1–2	3–1	1–1	0–0	1–1	2–1
Black Leopards	0–0	0–2	1–0	1–0	—	2–1	1–2	2–0	1–1	1–1	1–2			0–1		
Cape Town City	2–2	1–0	2–0	2–0	1–0	—	0–1	1–1	0–0	1–2	3–2	0–1	1–0	5–3	1–0	1–0
Chippa United		0–0	0–1	0–0	3–0	0–1	—	1–0	0–0	0–2	1–1	0–0		0–0	1–0	0–0
Lamontville Golden Arrows	1–1	1–0	0–1		1–2	1–4	2–1	—	0–0	0–1	3–2	1–0	0–0	2–1		2–2
Highlands Park	2–1		1–1		2–1	1–0	2–0	2–0	—	2–3	1–1	1–1	0–1	2–0	0–2	1–4
Kaizer Chiefs	0–1	1–0	1–1	5–3	1–0	3–0	1–0	2–0	3–0	—	0–1		3–2	0–1	1–1	1–1
Mamelodi Sundowns	1–0	0–1	0–0		3–0	1–1		1–0	1–0	0–2	—	2–1	0–0		2–0	3–1
Maritzburg United		1–0	0–0	2–2	0–1	1–1	1–0	2–1	1–1		2–2	—	0–1	1–0	0–2	3–0
Orlando Pirates	1–0	1–1	0–0	3–1	3–1	3–3	2–1	0–0		0–1	1–0	0–0	—	3–2	2–1	1–0
Polokwane City	1–0	0–1	0–1	0–1			2–0		1–1	2–3	0–3	0–1	1–4	—	3–1	0–2
SuperSport United	1–0	4–1			2–2	3–3	3–0	0–0	2–0	2–1		2–2	3–0	2–0	—	
Stellenbosch	1–0		0–2	1–2	2–2	1–0	1–1	1–0	0–0	0–4	0–1	0–0	1–0	1–0		—

Updated to match(es) played on 1 December 2019. Source: centre?type=results PSL
Legend: Blue = home team win; Yellow = draw; Red = away team win.
For upcoming matches, an "a" indicates there is an article about the rivalry between the two participants.

=== Position by round ===
leader and 2020-21 CAF Champions League
2020-21 CAF Champions League
2020-21 CAF Confederation Cup
Qualification to #Playoffs Tournament
Relegation to National First Division

Team ╲ Round	1	2	3	4	5	6	7	8	9	10	11	12	13	14	15	16	17	18	19	20	21	22	23	24	25	26	27	28	29	30
AmaZulu	16	16	16	16	16	16	16	15	15	15	15	15	15	14	11	14	12	15	16	16	15	16	14	15	14	15	15	14	14	13
Baroka	11	3	6	10	6	8	12	12	14	11	11	13	12	11	14	16	16	12	13	13	13	13	13	13	13	14	14	13	13	14
Bidvest Wits	1	7	2	2	1	1	3	3	2	2	2	2	2	2	3	3	2	3	3	4	4	4	4	4	3	3	4	3	5	4
Black Leopards	12	15	15	12	12	13	13	13	12	12	12	9	10	10	12	13	14	14	15	14	14	15	16	16	16	13	13	15	15	15
Bloemfontein Celtic	15	6	8	11	10	7	9	9	8	7	7	6	6	8	9	8	6	7	7	9	9	9	9	10	9	7	8	8	9	8
Cape Town City	10	4	7	8	11	11	10	11	13	13	13	12	11	12	15	11	11	13	12	11	10	11	10	9	7	8	7	7	7	6
Chippa United	9	11	12	13	13	14	14	16	16	16	16	16	16	16	10	10	10	10	10	12	12	12	12	12	12	12	12	12	12	11
Lamontville Golden Arrows	4	10	4	6	9	6	7	8	7	5	5	5	5	6	8	9		9	8	8	7	7	7	7	8	10	11	11	11	12
Highlands Park	8	14	11	7	7	5	6	4	4	6	6	8	7	9	7	6	8	9	9	8	8	8	8	8	10	9	9	9	8	9
Kaizer Chiefs	5	2	1	1	3	4	2	1	1	1	1	1	1	1	1	1	1	1	1	1	1	1	1	1	1	1	1	1	1	2
Mamelodi Sundowns	2	5	5	3	2	2	1	2	3	3	3	3	3	3	2	2	3	2	2	2	2	2	2	2	2	2	2	2	2	1
Maritzburg United	13	13	13	14	14	12	11	7	9	9	9	10	8	7	6	7	7	6	6	6	6	6	6	6	6	6	6	6	6	7
Orlando Pirates	3	9	10	9	8	10	8	10	10	8	8	7	9	5	5	5	5	5	4	3	3	3	3	3	4	5	5	5	4	3
Polokwane City	6	1	3	5	4	3	4	5	6	10	10	11	13	13	16	12	13	16	14	15	16	14	15	14	15	16	16	16	16	16
SuperSport United	14	8	9	4	5	9	5	6	5	4	4	4	4	4	4	4	4	4	5	5	5	5	5	5	5	4	3	4	3	5
Stellenbosch	7	12	14	15	15	15	15	14	11	14	14	14	14	15	13	15	15	11	11	11	10	10	11	11	11	11	10	10	10	10

== Statistics ==
=== Top goal scorers ===
Rank	Player	Club	Goals
1	(Malawi) Gabadinho Mhango	Orlando Pirates	16
1	(Namibia) Peter Shalulile	Highlands Park	16
3	(South Africa) Bradley Grobler	SuperSport United	13
3	(Serbia) Samir Nurkovic	Kaizer Chiefs	13
3	(Zimbabwe) Knox Mutizwa	Golden Arrows	13
3	(South Africa) Bongi Ntuli	AmaZulu	13
3	(South Africa) Kermit Erasmus	Cape Town City	13
8	(South Africa) Themba Zwane	Mamelodi Sundowns	11
9	(South Africa) Ndumiso Mabena	Bloemfontein Celtic	9
9	(Zimbabwe) Mwape Musonda	Black Leopards	9

==== Hat-tricks ====
Player	For	Against	Result	Date
(Zimbabwe) Charlton Mashumba	Polokwane City	Cape Town City	3–5 (A)	6 November 2019
(Serbia) Samir Nurkovic	Kaizer Chiefs	Bloemfontein Celtic	5–3 (H)	7 December 2019
(Malawi) Gabadinho Mhango	Orlando Pirates	Polokwane City	4–1 (A)	7 January 2020
(South Africa) Fagrie Lakay	Cape Town City	Golden Arrows	4–1 (A)	29 August 2020
(South Africa) Lebohang Maboe	Mamelodi Sundowns	Black Leopards	3–0 (H)	5 September 2020

=== Top assists ===
Rank	Player	Club	Assists
1	(South Africa) Lebogang Manyama	Kaizer Chiefs	9
1	(South Africa) Bradley Ralani	Cape Town City	9
3	(South Africa) Iqraam Rayners	Stellenbosch	8
3	(South Africa) Themba Zwane	Mamelodi Sundowns	8
5	(South Africa) Lindokuhle Mbatha	Highlands Park	7
5	(South Africa) Sibusiso Vilakazi	Mamelodi Sundowns	7
7	(South Africa) Menzi Masuku	Bloemfontein Celtic	6
7	(Serbia) Samir Nurkovic	Kaizer Chiefs	6
9	(South Africa) Tebogo Potsane	Bloemfontein Celtic	5
9	(South Africa) Teboho Mokoena	SuperSport United	5
9	(South Africa) Lesedi Kapinga	Black Leopards	5
9	(South Africa) Jabulani Maluleke	Polokwane City	5

=== Clean sheets ===
Rank	Player name	Club playing for	Clean Sheets
1	(South Africa) Ronwen Williams	SuperSport United	13
2	(South Africa) Wayne Sandilands	Orlando Pirates	12
3	(Ghana) Richard Ofori	Maritzburg United	11
3	(South Africa) Veli Mothwa	Chippa United	11
5	(Zimbabwe) Elvis Chipezeze	Baroka	9
5	(South Africa) Ricardo Goss	Bidvest Wits	9
5	(Nigeria) Daniel Akpeyi	Kaizer Chiefs	9
8	(Uganda) Dennis Onyango	Mamelodi Sundowns	8
8	(Netherlands) Peter Leeuwenburgh	Cape Town City	8
10	(Zambia) Kennedy Mweene	Mamelodi Sundowns	7

=== Discipline ===
==== Player ====
- Most yellow cards: 11
  - (South Africa) N.Makhubela
    (Lamontville Golden Arrows)
- Most red cards: 1
  - 16 players

==== Club ====
- Most yellow cards: 72
  - AmaZulu
- Most red cards: 3
  - Baroka
  - Chippa United

== Monthly Awards ==
Month	Player of the month		Coach of the month		Goal of the month		Ref.
Month	Player	Club	Player	Club	Player	Club	Ref.
August	(South Africa) Bradley Grobler	SuperSport United	(Germany) Ernst Middendorp	Kaizer Chiefs	(South Africa) Hlompho Kekana	Mamelodi Sundowns	
September/October	(Nigeria) Daniel Akpeyi	Kaizer Chiefs	(Germany) Ernst Middendorp	Kaizer Chiefs	(South Africa) Thabo Nodada	Cape Town City	
November	(South Africa) Sipho Mbule	SuperSport United	(Germany) Ernst Middendorp	Kaizer Chiefs	(South Africa) Dumisani Zuma	Kaizer Chiefs	
December	(South Africa) Gift Motupa	Bidvest Wits	(South Africa) Pitso Mosimane	Mamelodi Sundowns	(Serbia) Samir Nurković	Kaizer Chiefs	
January	(Malawi) Gabadinho Mhango	Orlando Pirates	(Germany) Josef Zinnbauer	Orlando Pirates	(Malawi) Gabadinho Mhango	Orlando Pirates	
February/March	(South Africa) Daylon Claasen	Maritzburg United	(South Africa) Eric Tinkler	Maritzburg United	(South Africa) Lebogang Manyama	Kaizer Chiefs	

== Attendances ==
No.	Club	Average	Total
1	Kaizer Chiefs	16,144	242,161
2	Orlando Pirates	13,642	204,624
3	Bloemfontein Celtic	8,572	128,578
4	Black Leopards	8,449	126,735
5	Mamelodi Sundowns	6,600	98,996
6	Chippa United	6,055	90,820
7	SuperSport United	4,619	69,278
8	Maritzburg United	4,266	63,997
9	Golden Arrows	3,919	58,784
10	AmaZulu FC	3,912	58,679
11	Highlands Park	3,443	51,641
12	Cape Town City FC	3,240	48,597
13	Stellenbosch FC	2,890	43,346
14	Baroka FC	2,742	41,130
15	Bidvest Wits	2,344	35,162
16	Polokwane City FC	2,221	33,310

== See also ==
- 2019 MTN 8
- 2019 Telkom Knockout
- 2019–20 Nedbank Cup
- 2019–20 National First Division
