= Kermit Erasmus =

South African soccer player (born 1990)

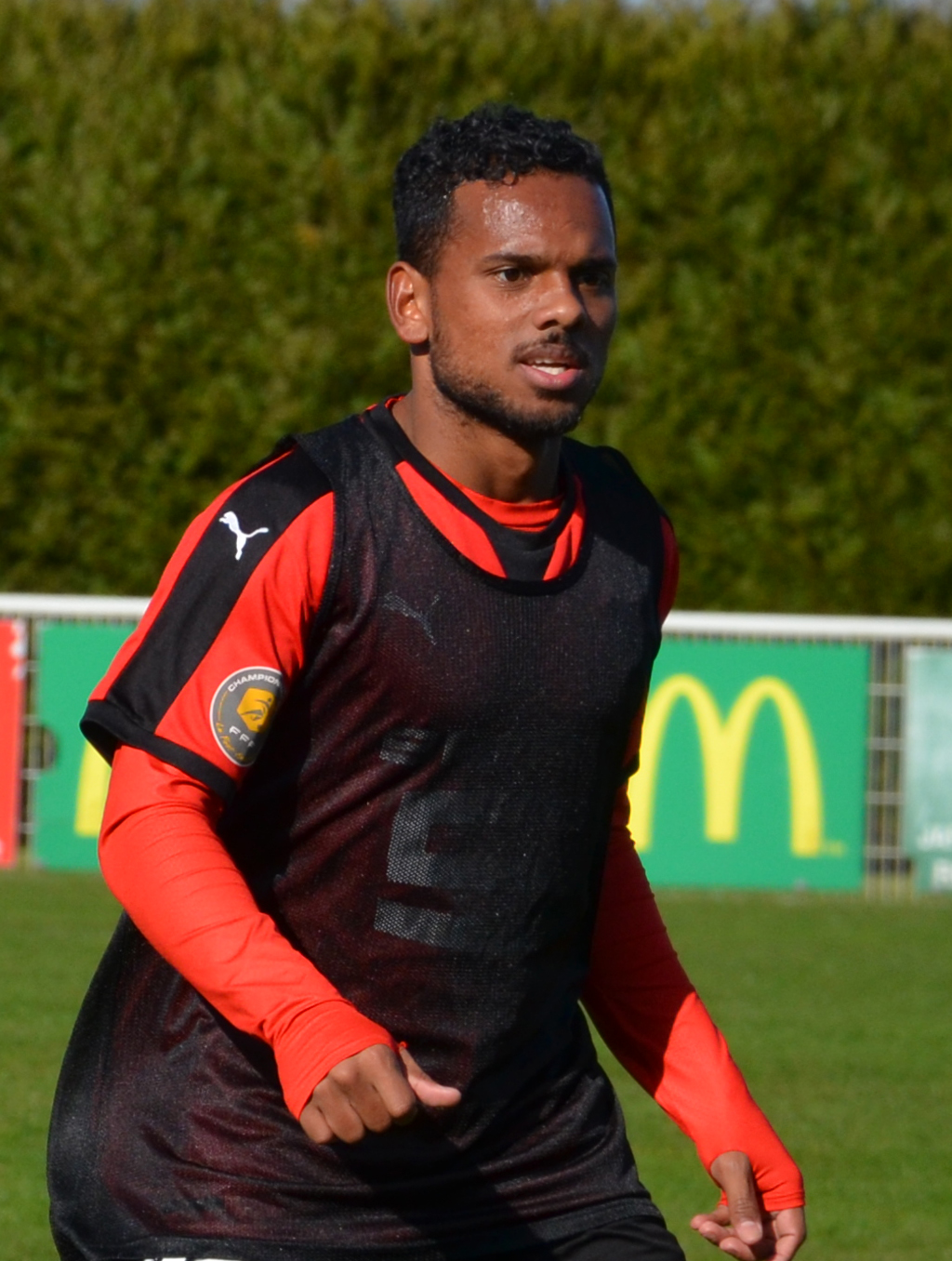
- Erasmus in Rennes training in 2016

Personal information
- Full name: Kermit Romeo Erasmus
- Date of birth: 8 July 1990 (age 36)
- Place of birth: Port Elizabeth, South Africa
- Height: 1.71 m (5 ft 7 in)
- Positions: Striker; winger

Team information
- Current team: Casric Stars

Youth career
- Rangers South Africa
- Park United
- –2007: SuperSport United

Senior career*
Years	Team	Apps	(Gls)
2007–2008	SuperSport United	12	(5)
2008–2010	Feyenoord	5	(1)
2009–2010	→ Excelsior (loan)	34	(15)
2010–2013	SuperSport United	58	(17)
2013–2016	Orlando Pirates	63	(19)
2016–2018	Rennes	10	(2)
2017	→ Lens (loan)	13	(3)
2018	AFC Eskilstuna	11	(2)
2018	Vitória de Setúbal	0	(0)
2019–2020	Cape Town City	38	(18)
2020–2022	Mamelodi Sundowns	26	(8)
2022–2024	Orlando Pirates	29	(10)
2025–	Casric Stars	4	(0)

International career^{‡}
2009	South Africa U-20	4	(3)
2010–	South Africa	15	(2)
- * Club domestic league appearances and goals as of 6 October 2022 ‡ National team caps and goals as of 10 March 2019

Kermit Romeo Erasmus (born 8 July 1990) is a South African professional soccer player who plays as a striker for National First Division club Casric Stars and the South Africa national team.

Born in Port Elizabeth, Erasmus moved to Pretoria as a teenager where he made his professional debut with SuperSport United in 2007. He spent the next two seasons in Netherlands with Feyenoord and Excelsior before returning to SuperSport United. During his second spell with the club, he made over 50 appearances and helped his side to the Nedbank Cup title before joining Orlando Pirates in 2013. He led Pirates to the same cup title in 2014 before leaving to join Rennes in France the following year.

Erasmus struggled with Rennes, however, and shortly after spending a stint on loan at Ligue 2 side, Lens, was released by the club. He spent the remainder of the 2018 in Sweden, with Eskilstuna, and Portugal, with Vitória de Setúbal.

== Club career ==
=== Early career ===
Erasmus was groomed by, and graduated from the SuperSport Feyenoord Academy (now SuperSport United Youth Academy) to join Feyenoord but remained at SuperSport United on trial for 2007–08 season. During the campaign, Erasmus made 10 appearances and scored once as Supersport clinched their first ever PSL title.

=== Feyenoord ===
On 29 May 2008, Eredivisie side Feyenoord announced the signing of Erasmus on a three-year deal from South African affiliate-club SuperSport United and handed him the no. 15 jersey for the 2008–09 season. He made only four appearances for the Rotterdam club during the campaign and in July 2009 it was announced Erasmus would be loaned to satellite club Excelsior in the Eerste Divisie for the following season. Erasmus, together with compatriot Kamohelo Mokotjo and six other Feyenoord players were loaned to Excelsior as a result of a new partnership between the two Rotterdam-based clubs.

==== Loan to Excelsior ====
Erasmus made his debut for Excelsior on 8 August and netted a late, headed equalizer in a 2–2 draw Telstar. By the conclusion of the season, Erasmus had netted 12 goals in 30 appearances whilst on loan at Excelsior. He did not return to Feyenoord, however, and the no.15 jersey he had previously worn was handed to Mokotjo for the upcoming season. During his time in the Netherlands Erasmus was nominated for the 2009 CAF Most Promising Talent of the Year award but lost out in the end to Ghana's Dominic Adiyiah.

=== Supersport United ===
On 10 July 2010, it was announced that Erasmus would be returning to South Africa to rejoin SuperSport United after failing to make the grade at Feyenoord. Eleven days after his return, Erasmus made his second appearance for Supersport United and scored what was described as a "sensational strike" in an MTN 8 loss against Moroka Swallows.

On 26 May 2012, Erasmus scored the second goal in Matsatsantsa's 2–0 win over Mamelodi Sundowns in the Nedbank Cup final. He left Supersport United at the end of the following season having made over 50 league appearances during his second spell at the club.

=== Orlando Pirates ===
On 23 July 2013, Irvin Khoza, the Chairman of Orlando Pirates, confirmed the signing of Erasmus from Supersport United. The following day Pirates lodged a request to CAF for Erasmus to be registered for the upcoming CAF Champions League campaign. The request was denied, however, as Erasmus had already represented Supersport United in the CAF Confederations Cup earlier in the season. As per CAF regulations, a player is only eligible to feature for one club in CAF inter-club competitions during the course of a season.

The 2014–15 season proved to be the most fruitful of Erasmus' spell in Soweto as he netted a career-best 10 goals over the course of the PSL campaign. He also scored his first professional hat-trick on 2 May in a 3–0 CAF Confederations Cup win over Gabonese side CF Mounana. Erasmus then crowned the season off in style on 17 May by netting a match-winning brace as Orlando Pirates triumphed 3–1 over Bidvest Wits to lift the 2014 Nedbank Cup.

On 8 January 2016, Erasmus was named in the 18-man CAF Team of the Year. He had also been nominated for the 2015 CAF African-based African Player of the Year award alongside Orlando Pirates teammate Filipe Ovono but eventually lost out to Mbwana Ally Samatta of Tanzania. Eight days later, he netted a late equalizer in 3–3 PSL draw with Maritzburg United, with Pirates having trailed 3–0 in the first half. The goal proved to be Erasmus' final contribution for the Sea Robbers as the following week he completed a move to French Ligue 1 side Rennes.

=== Rennes ===
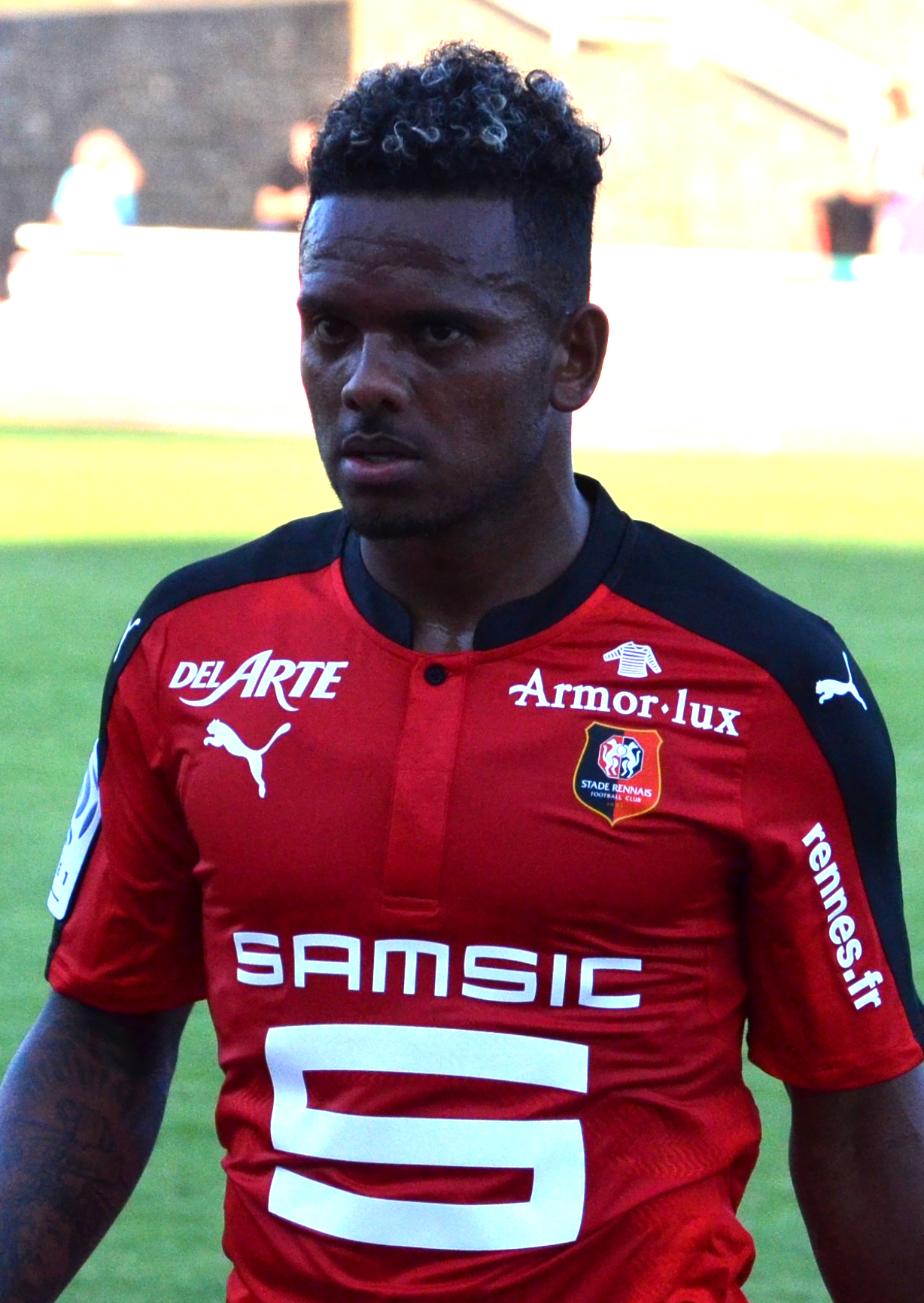
Erasmus spent two seasons in France with Rennes (pictured) and Lens.

On 28 January 2016, Erasmus signed for Ligue 1 club Stade Rennais on a two-and-a-half-year deal. He made his debut for the club on 13 March, coming on as an 80th-minute substitute for Pedro Henrique in a 2–2 draw with Lyon. His only other appearance for the season came on the final day of the campaign in a 2–1 loss to Bastia which saw Rennes end eighth in Ligue 1. He made his first appearance of the following campaign in Rennes' opening match of the season, coming on as a second-half substitute for Gélson Fernandes in a 1–0 defeat to Nice.

==== Loan to Lens ====
On 21 January 2017, Erasmus signed for Ligue 2 side RC Lens for the remainder of the season. He scored once in 12 league appearances for the club, with the goal coming on the final day of the season as Lens narrowly missed out on promotion. He returned to Rennes at the end of the campaign but, by February 2018 failed to make another appearance and was released by the club.

=== AFC Eskilstuna ===
On 26 March 2018, Erasmus signed a two-year deal with AFC Eskilstuna, newly relegated to Superettan, Sweden's second tier. He went on to play 11 league games for the club, scoring twice, during the season.

=== Vitória ===
On 17 August 2018, he transferred to Portuguese club Vitória de Setúbal in the Primeira Liga.

=== Cape Town City Football Club ===
On 18 December 2018, Erasmus signed for PSL side Cape Town City.

=== Orlando Pirates return ===
On 23 September 2022, Orlando Pirates confirmed the return of Erasmus on a two-year deal, from Mamelodi Sundowns.

== International career ==
=== Youth ===
Erasmus represented South Africa at the 2009 FIFA U-20 World Cup in Egypt and scored three goals throughout the course of the tournament.

=== Senior ===
Erasmus was called up to the senior squad for the first time in March 2008 for South Africa's friendly against Zimbabwe. In doing so, he was in line to break the record then-held by former captain Aaron Mokoena and become South Africa's youngest ever full international. He did not take to the field and had to wait until 4 September 2010 before he made his debut, coming on as a second-half substitute for Katlego Mphela against Niger in a 2012 African Cup of Nations qualifier. Erasmus had to wait a further three years before scoring his first goal for South Africa, finally netting in a 2014 FIFA World Cup qualification match against Botswana on 7 September 2013.

== Personal life ==
In 2010 Erasmus starred in the award-winning feature Documentary film Soka Afrika which highlighted the plight of young footballers across Africa.

Erasmus married Lauren Koehoorn in 2015; however, the marriage ended in 2018. They have two daughters together.

== Career statistics ==
=== Club ===
As of 1 October 2020

Appearances and goals by club, season and competition
Club	Season	League			Cup^{1}		League Cup^{2}		Continental^{3}		Other^{4}		Total	
Club	Season	Division	Apps	Goals	Apps	Goals	Apps	Goals	Apps	Goals	Apps	Goals	Apps	Goals
SuperSport United	2007–08	Premier Soccer League	10	1	0	0	0	0	0	0	0	0	10	1
Feyenoord	2008–09	Eredivisie	4	0	0	0	0	0	2	0	0	0	6	0
Excelsior (loan)	2009–10	Eerste Divisie	31	12	1	0	0	0	0	0	4	0	36	12
SuperSport United	2010–11	PSL	19	4	0	0	1	1	2	0	0	0	22	5
SuperSport United	2011–12	PSL	19	5	1	0	0	0	0	0	0	0	20	5
SuperSport United	2012–13	PSL	19	5	2	0	1	0	0	0	0	0	22	5
SuperSport United	Total		57	14	3	0	2	1	0	0	0	0	64	15
Orlando Pirates	2013–14	PSL	26	4	2	1	4	0	0	0	0	0	32	5
Orlando Pirates	2014–15	PSL	26	10	2	0	4	2	0	0	0	0	32	12
Orlando Pirates	2015–16	PSL	13	3	3	1	0	0	0	0	0	0	16	4
Orlando Pirates	Total		65	17	7	2	8	2	0	0	0	0	80	21
Rennes	2015–16	Ligue 1	2	0	0	0	0	0	0	0	0	0	2	0
Rennes	2016–17	Ligue 1	8	0	2	0	0	0	0	0	0	0	10	0
Rennes	Total		10	0	2	0	0	0	0	0	0	0	12	0
Lens (loan)	2016–17	Ligue 2	12	1	0	0	1	0	0	0	4	0	13	1
AFC Eskilstuna	2018	Superettan	11	2	0	0	0	0	0	0	0	0	11	2
Vitória F.C.	2018–19	Primeira Liga	0	0	0	0	1	0	0	0	0	0	1	0
Cape Town City	2018–19	PSL	13	3	0	0	0	0	0	0	0	0	13	3
Cape Town City	2019–20	PSL	25	13	0	0	0	0	0	0	0	0	25	13
Cape Town City	Total		38	16	0	0	0	0	0	0	0	0	38	16
Mamelodi Sundowns	2020–21	PSL	1	1	0	0	0	0	0	0	1	0	2	1
Career total			239	65	13	2	12	3	2	0	5	0	271	69

^{1} Includes Telkom Knockout and KNVB Beker matches. ^{2} Includes MTN 8 matches. ^{3} Includes UEFA Europa League and CAF Champions League matches. ^{4} Includes Jupiler Playoff matches.

Appearances in CAF Confederations Cup
Year	Club	Appearances	Goals
2013	SuperSport United	5	1
2015	Orlando Pirates	10	5
Total		15	6

=== International ===
As of 13 October 2020

Appearances and goals by national team and year
National team	Year	Apps	Goals
South Africa	2010	2	0
South Africa	2011	1	0
South Africa	2012	1	0
South Africa	2013	4	1
South Africa	2014	3	0
South Africa	2017	3	1
South Africa	2018	3	0
South Africa	2019	1	0
Total		18	2

As of 13 October 2020
Scores and results list South Africa's goal tally first, score column indicates score after each Erasmus goal.

List of international goals scored by Kermit Erasmus
#	Date	Venue	Opponent	Score	Result	Competition
1	7 September 2013	Moses Mabhida Stadium Durban, South Africa	Botswana	1–0	4–1	2014 FIFA World Cup qualification
2	25 March 2017	Moses Mabhida Stadium, Durban, South Africa	Guinea-Bissau	1–0	3–1	Friendly

== Honours ==
=== Club ===
Supersport United

- Premier Soccer League: 2007–08
- Nedbank Cup: 2011–12

Mamelodi Sundowns

- Premier Soccer League: 2021–22
- MTN 8 : 2021

Orlando Pirates

- Nedbank Cup: 2013–14; 2023
- MTN 8 : 2022, 2023

=== Individual ===
- CAF Team of the Year: 2015 (as a substitute)
