= 2023–24 Mamelodi Sundowns F.C. season =

Mamelodi Sundowns 2023–24 football season

Mamelodi Sundowns
2023–24 season
- Owner: Patrice Motsepe
- Chairman: Tlhopie Motsepe
- Head coach: Rhulani Mokoena
- Stadium: Lucas Masterpieces Moripe Stadium; Loftus Versfeld Stadium
- DStv Premiership: 1st
- MTN 8: Runners-up
- Nedbank Cup: Runners-up
- Champions League: Semi-final
- African Football League: Winner
- Highest home attendance: 28,900 v Kaizer Chiefs; 9 August 2023
- Biggest win: 4–0 v Golden Arrows; 15 August 2023
| Home colours | Away colours |

The 2023–24 was Mamelodi Sundowns' 28th consecutive season in the South African Premier Division.

== First Team Squad ==
| Squad No. | Player | Nationality | Date of birth | Signed From | Apps | Goals | Assists |
Goalkeepers
| 1 | Kennedy Mweene | Zambia | 11 December 1984 (Aged 37) | (South Africa) Free State Stars | 0 | 0 | 0 |
| 14 | Denis Onyango | Uganda | 15 May 1985 (Aged 38) | (South Africa) Bidvest Wits (on loan) | 9 | 0 | 0 |
| 30 | Reyaad Pieterse | South Africa | 17 February 1992 (Aged 30) | (South Africa) SuperSport United | 2 | 0 | 0 |
| 32 | Ronwen Williams | South Africa | 21 January 1992 (Aged 30) | (South Africa) SuperSport United | 46 | 0 | 0 |
| 39 | Jody February | South Africa | 12 May 1996 (Aged 26) | (South Africa) Ajax Cape Town | 1 | 0 | 0 |
Defenders
| 3 | Rushine De Reuck | South Africa | 1 January 1996 (Aged 26) | (South Africa) Maritzburg United | 5 | 0 | 0 |
| 5 | Mosa Lebusa | South Africa | 10 October 1992 (Aged 30) | (South Africa) Ajax Cape Town | 34 | 0 | 0 |
| 6 | Brian Onyango | Kenya | 24 July 1994 (Aged 28) | (South Africa) Maritzburg United | 9 | 0 | 0 |
| 20 | Grant Kekana | South Africa | 31 October 1992 (Aged 30) | (South Africa) SuperSport United | 37 | 4 | 0 |
| 25 | Khuliso Mudau | South Africa | 26 April 1995 (Aged 27) | (South Africa) Black Leopards | 36 | 2 | 0 |
| 27 | Thapelo Morena | South Africa | 6 August 1993 (Aged 29) | (South Africa) Bloemfontein Celtic | 27 | 1 | 1 |
| 37 | Sifiso Ngobeni | South Africa | 8 February 1997 (Aged 27) | (South Africa) Bloemfontein Celtic | 2 | 0 | 0 |
| 41 | Terrence Mashego | South Africa | 23 June 1998 (Aged 24) | (South Africa) Cape Town City | 2 | 0 | 0 |
| 42 | Rivaldo Coetzee | South Africa | 16 October 1996 (Aged 26) | (South Africa) Ajax Cape Town | 29 | 0 | 0 |
Midfielders
| 4 | Teboho Mokoena | South Africa | 24 January 1997 (Aged 25) | (South Africa) SuperSport United | 37 | 5 | 3 |
| 8 | Bongani Zungu | South Africa | 9 October 1992 (Aged 30) | (France) Amiens SC | 30 | 0 | 3 |
| 15 | Andile Jali | South Africa | 10 April 1990 (Aged 32) | (Belgium) K.V. Oostende | 0 | 0 | 0 |
| 17 | Aubrey Modiba | South Africa | 22 June 1995 (Aged 27) | (South Africa) SuperSport United | 37 | 3 | 2 |
| 18 | Themba Zwane | South Africa | 3 August 1989 (Aged 33) | (South Africa) Mpumalanga Black Aces (On loan) | 41 | 2 | 4 |
| 19 | Gift Motupa | South Africa | 23 September 1994 (Aged 28) | (South Africa) Bidvest Wits | 0 | 0 | 0 |
| 21 | Sphelele Mkhulise | South Africa | 19 February 1996 (Aged 26) | (South Africa) Richards Bay (On loan) | 24 | 0 | 2 |
| 23 | Haashim Domingo | South Africa | 13 August 1995 (Aged 27) | (South Africa) Bidvest Wits | 0 | 0 | 0 |
| 23 | Sipho Mbule | South Africa | 22 March 1998 (Aged 24) | (South Africa) SuperSport United | 22 | 1 | 0 |
| 26 | Erwin Saavedra | Bolivia | 26 February 1996 (Aged 26) | (Bolivia) Club Bolívar | 0 | 0 | 0 |
| 29 | Bradley Ralani | South Africa | 4 October 1987 (Aged 35) | (South Africa) Cape Town City | 0 | 0 | 0 |
| 33 | Cassius Mailula | South Africa | 12 June 2001 (Aged 21) | Reserves | 0 | 0 | 0 |
| 35 | Neo Maema | South Africa | 1 December 1995 (Aged 26) | (South Africa) Bloemfontein Celtic | 28 | 1 | 2 |
| 41 | Mothobi Mvala | South Africa | 14 June 1994 (Aged 28) | (South Africa) Highlands Park | 30 | 1 | 1 |
Forwards
| 10 | Gastón Sirino | Uruguay | 22 February 1991 (Aged 31) | (Bolivia) Club Bolívar | 24 | 5 | 2 |
| 11 | Marcelo Allende | Chile | 7 April 1999 (Aged 23) | (Uruguay) Montevideo City Torque | 44 | 4 | 6 |
| 12 | Thabiso Kutumela | South Africa | 2 July 1993 (Aged 29) | (South Africa) Maritzburg United | 0 | 0 | 0 |
| 22 | Lesedi Kapinga | South Africa | 25 May 1995 (Aged 27) | (South Africa) Black Leopards | 0 | 0 | 0 |
| 28 | Abubeker Nassir | Ethiopia | 23 February 2000 (Aged 22) | (Ethiopia) Ethiopian Coffee | 4 | 0 | 0 |
| 33 | Lebohang Maboe | South Africa | 17 September 1994 (Aged 28) | (South Africa) Maritzburg United | 24 | 1 | 5 |
| 38 | Peter Shalulile | Namibia | 23 October 1993 (Aged 29) | (South Africa) Highlands Park | 39 | 15 | 3 |

== Competitions ==
| Competition | First match | Last match | Starting round | Final position | Record | | | | | | | |
| Competition | First match | Last match | Starting round | Final position | Pld | W | D | L | GF | GA | GD | Win % |
|---|---|---|---|---|---|---|---|---|---|---|---|---|
| 2023–24 PSL | August 2023 | June 2024 | Matchday 1 | Winner | 30 | 22 | 7 | 1 | 51 | 10 | +41 | 73.33 |
| 2023 MTN 8 | 28 August 2023 | 22 October 2023 | First Round | Runner-up | 4 | 2 | 1 | 1 | 4 | 2 | +2 | 50.00 |
| 2023-24 CAF Champions League | 9 October 2023 | 26 April 2024 | Group stage | Semi Finalist | 12 | 6 | 3 | 3 | 13 | 3 | +10 | 50.00 |
| 2023-24 Nedbank Cup | 7 February 2024 | 5 May 2024 | Round of 32 | Runner-up | 5 | 3 | 1 | 1 | 12 | 6 | +6 | 60.00 |
| 2023 African Football League | | TBD | Group stage | Winner | 6 | 3 | 2 | 1 | 6 | 2 | +4 | 50.00 |
| 2023 Carling Knockout Cup | | TBD | Round of 16 | Round of 16 | 1 | 0 | 1 | 0 | 2 | 2 | +0 | 0.00 |
| Total | | | | | 58 | 36 | 15 | 7 | 88 | 25 | +63 | 62.07 |

Source: Competitions

== Premier Soccer League ==
=== Results summary ===
| Overall | | | | | | | | Home | | | | | | Away | | | | | |
| Pld | W | D | L | GF | GA | GD | Pts | W | D | L | GF | GA | GD | W | D | L | GF | GA | GD |
|---|---|---|---|---|---|---|---|---|---|---|---|---|---|---|---|---|---|---|---|
| 30 | 22 | 7 | 1 | 52 | 11 | +41 | 73 | 11 | 3 | 1 | 29 | 6 | +23 | 11 | 4 | 0 | 23 | 5 | +18 |

=== Results by matchday ===
| matchday | 1 | 2 | 3 | 4 | 5 | 6 | 7 | 8 | 9 | 10 | 11 | 12 | 13 | 14 | 15 | 16 | 17 | 18 | 19 | 20 | 21 | 22 | 23 | 24 | 25 | 26 | 27 | 28 | 29 | 30 |
|---|---|---|---|---|---|---|---|---|---|---|---|---|---|---|---|---|---|---|---|---|---|---|---|---|---|---|---|---|---|---|
| ground | A (Note: GW1) | H | H | A | A | A | A | H | A | A | H | A | H | H | H | H | H | H | H | A | A | H | H | A | A | H | A | A | A | H |
| Results | W | W | W | W | W | W | W | W | W | W | W | D | W | D | D | W | W | D | W | W | D | W | W | W | D | W | W | W | D | L |
| Position | 1 | 1 | 1 | 1 | 1 | 1 | 1 | 1 | 1 | 1 | 1 | 1 | 1 | 1 | 1 | 1 | 1 | 1 | 1 | 1 | 1 | 1 | 1 | 1 | 1 | 1 | 1 | 1 | 1 | 1 |
| Points | 3 | 6 | 9 | 12 | 15 | 18 | 21 | 24 | 27 | 30 | 33 | 34 | 37 | 38 | 39 | 42 | 45 | 46 | 49 | 52 | 53 | 56 | 59 | 62 | 63 | 66 | 69 | 72 | 73 | 73 |

Updated to match(es) played on 8 February 2025. Source: psl
A = Away; H = Home; W = Win; D = Draw; L = Loss

=== Matches ===
| 4 August 2023 1 | Sekhukhune United | 1–2 | Mamelodi Sundowns | Polokwane, LP |
| 19:30SAST | Mncube (red card) 16' Webber 61' | Report | Shalulile 12' (pen.); Lucas 57'; Mudau (yellow card) 58'; Mokoena (yellow card) 66'; Zwane (yellow card) 77'; Coetzee (red card) 85'; Williams (yellow card) 90+2'; Boutouil (yellow card) 90+6' | Stadium: Peter Mokaba Stadium; Referee: Sikhumbuzo Gasa |

| 9 August 2023 2 | Mamelodi Sundowns | 2–1 | Kaizer Chiefs | Pretoria, GP |
| 15:00 SAST | Boutouil (yellow card) 18'; Lucas 21'; Mudau (yellow card) 45+1'; Mvala (yellow card) 51'; Maema 90'; Allende (yellow card) 90+1'; Williams (yellow card) 90+2' | Report | Hlanti (yellow card) 35'; Sithebe (yellow card) 45+4'; Chivaviro (yellow card) 57'; Du Preez 81' | Stadium: Lucas Moripe Stadium; Attendance: 28,900; Referee: Abongile Tom |

| 15 August 2023 3 | Mamelodi Sundowns | 4–0 | Golden Arrows | Pretoria, GP |
| 17:00 SAST | Shalulile 17'; Nku 21', 47'; Kekana 39' | Report | | Stadium: Lucas Moripe; Referee: Msimeleli Mabuto |

| 19 August 2023 4 | Chippa United | 0–2 | Mamelodi Sundowns | Gqeberha, EC |
| 20:00 SAST | Chabalala (yellow card) 16'; Mdunyelwa (yellow card) 20'; Roscoe Pietersen (yellow card) 90+3' | Report | Coetzee (yellow card) 26'; Modiba 36'; Chabalala 40' (o.g.); Mvala (yellow card) 46'; Boutouil (yellow card) 90' | Stadium: Nelson Mandela Bay; Referee: Tshidiso Mkhwanazi; Man of the Match: Marcelo Allende |

| 23 August 2023 5 | Richards Bay | 0–1 | Mamelodi Sundowns | Durban, KN |
| 17:00 SAST | | Report | Mendieta 11'; Boutouil (yellow card) 90+3' | Stadium: King Goodwill Zwelithini Stadium; Referee: Moreki Lekwape |

| 30 August 2023 6 | Polokwane City | 0–2 | Mamelodi Sundowns | Polokwane, LP |
| 17:00 SAST | | Report | Mendieta (yellow card) 30'; Ribeiro 50', 13' (pen.); Lebusa (yellow card) 66'; Maboe (red card) | Stadium: Peter Mokaba Stadium; Man of the Match: Ribeiro |

| 20 September 2023 7 | Orlando Pirates | 0–1 | Mamelodi Sundowns | Jo'burg, GP |
| 19:30 SAST | Chaine (yellow card) 11'; Monare (yellow card) 44' | Report | Ribeiro 12' (pen.); Mbule (yellow card) 27'; Williams (yellow card) 44'; Allende (yellow card) 66'; Mudau (yellow card) 68'; Modiba (yellow card) 70'; Mvala (yellow card) 89'; Mokoena (yellow card) 90+4' | Stadium: Orlando Stadium |

| 2 April 2024 8 | Mamelodi Sundowns | 3–1 | Stellenbosch | Pretoria, GP |
| 19:30 SAST | Zungu (yellow card) 28'; Kekana 34'; Modiba 39'; Mabena 90' (yellow card) 90+2' | Report | Titus 14'; Mcaba (yellow card) 30'; Sibande (yellow card) 38'; Moloisane (yellow card) 66'; Palace (yellow card) 88' | Stadium: LucasMoripe Stadium |

| 2 April 2024 9 | SuperSport United | 0–2 | Mamelodi Sundowns | Pretoria, GP |
| 19:30 SAST | Campbell (yellow card) 64' | Report | Shalulile 30'; Ribeiro 45+1'; Mashego (yellow card) 76' | Stadium: Lucas Moripe Stadium |

| 6 December 2023 10 | AmaZulu | 0–1 | Mamelodi Sundowns | Durban, KZN |
| 19:30 SAST | Gumede (yellow card) 20'; Ngema (yellow card) 45+2' | Report | Ribeiro 21' (pen.); Mudau (yellow card) 75' | Stadium: King Zwelithini Stadium |

| 13 December 2023 11 | Mamelodi Sundowns | 3–0 | Cape Town Spurs | Pretoria, GP |
| 19:30 SAST | Mbule 23' (yellow card) 65'; Kekana 29'; Mkhulise (yellow card) 66'; Shalulile 90' | Report | Morton (yellow card) 43'; Haukongo (yellow card) 63' | Stadium: Loftus Versveld; Man of the Match: Mbule |

| 24 December 2023 12 | Cape Town City | 0–0 | Mamelodi Sundowns | Cape Town, WC |
| 15:30 SAST | Nodada (yellow card) 8' | Report | Zungu (yellow card) 44' | Stadium: Cape Town Stadium |

| 27 December 2023 13 | Mamelodi Sundowns | 3–0; Walkover | Moroka Swallows | Pretoria, GP |
| 19:30 SAST | | Report | | Stadium: Loftus Versveld |

| 30 December 2023 14 | Mamelodi Sundowns | 0–0 | Polokwane City | Pretoria, GP |
| 17:45 SAST | | Report | Van Heerden (yellow card) 24'; Kambala (yellow card) 68'; Sapunga (yellow card) 83' | Stadium: Loftus Versveld |

| 17 February 2024 15 | Mamelodi Sundowns | 1–1 | Orlando Pirates | Pretoria, GP |
| 20:00 SAST | Allende (yellow card) 38' (goal) 74'; Aubaas (yellow card) 52'; Esquivel (yellow card) 63'; Lunga (yellow card) 79'; Boutouil (yellow card) 88'; Shalulile (yellow card) 90+8' | Report | Timm (red card); Hotto (yellow card) 43'; Xoli 78' (pen.) | Stadium: Loftus Versveld; Attendance: 40 000 |

| 27 February 2024 16 | Mamelodi Sundowns | 3–0 | AmaZulu | Pretoria, GP |
| 19:30 SAST | Ribeiro 48', 57', 78' | Report | Gumede (yellow card) 18'; Fielies (yellow card) 18' | Stadium: Loftus Versveld; Man of the Match: Lucas Ribeiro Costa |

| 9 March 2024 17 | Mamelodi Sundowns | 2–0 | Chippa United | Pretoria, GP |
| 20:00 SAST | Mokoena 9'; Zungu (yellow card) 77'; Metthews 85' | Report | Chabalala (yellow card) 34'; Kambindu (yellow card) 81'; Kammies (yellow card) 87' | Stadium: Lucas Moripe Stadium |

| 12 March 2024 18 | Mamelodi Sundowns | 1–1 | Supersport United | Pretoria, GP |
| 19:30 SAST | Lorch (yellow card) 25'; Mokoena 30' (yellow card) 64' | Report | Grobler (yellow card) 14' (goal) 34' | Stadium: Loftus Versveld |

| 2 April 2024 19 | Mamelodi Sundowns | 1–0 | Richards Bay | Pretoria, GP |
| 19:30 SAST | Mdunyelwa (yellow card) 81'; Mendieta 90+4' | Report | Barns (yellow card) 20' | Stadium: Loftus Versveld |

| 9 April 2024 20 | Cape Town Spurs | 0–1 | Mamelodi Sundowns | Cape Town, WC |
| 19:30 SAST | Velebayi (yellow card) 41'; A. Cupido (yellow card) 73'; Michael (yellow card) 74' | Report | Ribeiro 42' (pen.); Mudau (yellow card) 58'; Kekana (yellow card) 73'; Mendieta (yellow card) 75' | Stadium: Athlone Stadium; Man of the Match: Ribeiro |

| 16 April 2024 21 | Moroka Swallows | 2–2 | Mamelodi Sundowns | Soweto, GP |
| 19:30 SAST | Mahlohonoko 57'; J.Everson (yellow card) 58'; Mthethwa (yellow card) 72'; Mhango 85' | Report | Mokoena 39'; Mudau (yellow card) 43'; Allende 51'; Lunga (yellow card) 56' | Stadium: Dobsonville Stadium; Referee: Jelly Chavani |

| 23 April 2024 22 | Mamelodi Sundowns | 2–1 | Sekhukhune United | Pretoria, GP |
| 19:30 SAST | Metthews 1'; Morena 7'; Maboe (yellow card) 17'; B. Onyango (yellow card) 27'; February (yellow card) 76' | Report | Yamba (yellow card) 38'; Cardoso (yellow card) 43'; Ohizu 50' (pen.); Mokwana (yellow card) 57'; Tiwani (yellow card) 82' | Stadium: Loftus Versveld Stadium; Referee: Abongile Tom; Man of the Match: Tashreeq Metthews |

| 29 April 2024 23 | Mamelodi Sundowns | 3–0 | TS Galaxy | Pretoria, GP |
| 19:30 SAST | Mkhulise (yellow card) 21'; Shalulile 26', 35'; Lorch 64'; Aubaas (yellow card) 73' | Report | Mvelase (yellow card) 8'; Mahlangu (yellow card) 67'; Mongae (red card) | Stadium: Loftus Versveld Stadium; Man of the Match: Themba Zwane |

| 2 May 2024 24 | Kaizer Chiefs | 1–5 | Mamelodi Sundowns | Jo'burg, GP |
| 19:30 SAST | Macheke (yellow card) 12'; Msimango (red card) 19'; Ditlhokwe (yellow card) 67'; Shabalala 85' (pen.); Maart (yellow card) 86' | Report | Maema (yellow card) 10'; Mdunyelwa (yellow card) 25'; Metthews 52', 82'; Esquivel 56'; Mashego (yellow card) 62'; Ribeiro 90'; Lorch 90+4' | Stadium: FNB Stadium; Referee: Abongile Tom; Man of the Match: Tashreeq Metthews |

| 8 May 2024 25 | Golden Arrows | 0–0 | Mamelodi Sundowns | Mpumalanga Stadium |
| 19:30 SAST | Sibiya (yellow card) 55'; Watenga (yellow card) 74' | Report | Williams (yellow card) 45+1'; Lebusa (red card) |

| 11 May 2024 26 | Mamelodi Sundowns | 1–0 | Royal AM | Pretoria, GP |
| 19:30 SAST | Mudau (yellow card) 37'; Shalulile 85' | Report | JM Dlamini (yellow card) 43'; Kobedi (yellow card) 54' | Stadium: Lucas Moripe Stadium |

| 14 May 2024 27 | Royal AM | 0–2 | Mamelodi Sundowns | P'Maritzburg, KZN |
| 19:30 SAST | Mahlasela (yellow card) 55'; Jones (yellow card) 69' | Report | Shalulile 41' (yellow card) 66'; Mvala (yellow card) 56'; Nku 74' | Stadium: Harry Gwala Stadium |

| 18 May 2024 28 | Stellenbosch | 0–1 | Mamelodi Sundowns | Cape Town, WC |
| 19:30 SAST | | Report | Coetzee (yellow card) 30'; Zwane (yellow card) 32'; Lorch (yellow card) 55'; Nku 66'; Mdunyelwa (yellow card) 72' | Stadium: Athlone Stadium |

== MTN 8 ==
| 12 August 2023 Quarter-final | Mamelodi Sundowns | 1–0 | Moroka Swallows | Pretoria, GP |
| 15:00 SAST | Zwane (yellow card) 1' (goal) 46'; Mokoena (yellow card) 45+1'; Maema (yellow card) 75'; Allende (yellow card) 90' | Report | Jali (red card) 8' | Stadium: Lucas Moripe Stadium |

| 2 September 2023 Semi-final, first leg | Kaizer Chiefs | 1–1 | Mamelodi Sundowns | Soweto, GP |
| 15:00 | Castillo (yellow card) 38' (goal) 60'; Mmodi (yellow card) 42' | Report | Mvala (yellow card) 21'; Modiba (yellow card) 27'; Mudau (yellow card) 85' (goal) 90' | Stadium: FNB Stadium; Attendance: 70 000 |

| 23 September 2023 Semi-final, second leg | Mamelodi Sundowns | 2–1 (3–2 agg.) | Kaizer Chiefs | Pretoria, GP |
| | Shalulile 1', 45'; Lebusa (yellow card) 36'; Boutouil (yellow card) 48'; Maseko (yellow card) 57' | Report | Matlou 34'; Maart (yellow card) 58' | Stadium: Loftus Versveld Stadium; Attendance: 40,000 |

| 7 October 2023 Final | Orlando Pirates | 0–0 (3–1 p) | Mamelodi Sundowns | Durban, KZN |
| 18:00 SAST | Maswanganyi (yellow card) 54'; Chaine (yellow card) 75'; Xoki (yellow card) 112' | Report | Boutouil (yellow card) 45+6'; Zwane (yellow card) 45+7'; Mokoena (yellow card) 49'; Mudau (yellow card) 100'; Mkhulise (yellow card) 120+1' | Stadium: Moses Mabhida Stadium |
| | Penalties |
| | Hotto (penalty scored); Kapinga (penalty scored); Xoki (penalty missed); Kimvuidi (penalty scored) | | (penalty missed) Zungu; (penalty missed) Mendieta; (penalty missed) Mokoena; (penalty scored) Mvala |

== Carling Knockout Cup ==
| 18 October 2023 Round of 16 | TS Galaxy | 2–2 (a.e.t.) (5–4 p) | Mamelodi Sundowns | Mbombela, MP |
| 19:30 | Mahlangu 13'; Vidal 16' (yellow card) 32'; Mbunjana (yellow card) 45'; Mojela (yellow card) 54'; Mbatha (yellow card) 75' | Report | Boutouil (yellow card) 22'; Allende (yellow card) 31' (goal) 57'; De Reuck (yellow card) 39'; Mashego (yellow card) 48'; Lebusa (yellow card) 55'; Zungu (red card); Sirino 98' | Stadium: Mbombela Stadium |
| | Penalties |
| | Mbunjana (penalty scored); Letsoenyo (penalty scored); Sanoka (penalty scored); Silađi (penalty missed); Munyai (penalty scored); Nurkovic (penalty scored) | | (penalty missed) B. Onyango; (penalty scored) Sirino; (penalty scored) Allende; (penalty scored) Ramotsei; (penalty scored) Mkhulise; (penalty missed) Nku |

== Nedbank Cup ==
| 20 February 2024 First round | La Masia | 1–6 | Mamelodi Sundowns | Soweto |
| 19:00 SAST | Johnson 36' (pen.); Redemeyer (yellow card) 65' | | Sirino 18', 39', 70'; Esquivel 22'; Mashego 27'; Maboe 29'; Mendieta (yellow card) 28'; Allende (yellow card) 34'; Lebusa (yellow card) 45' | Stadium: Dobsonville Stadium |

| 17 March 2024 Round of 16 | Mamelodi Sundowns | 2–0 | Maritzburg United | Pretoria, GP |
| 18:00 SAST | Zungu (yellow card) 63'; Lorch 75', 90+5'; Mudau (yellow card) 87' | | Kamatuka (yellow card) 15'; Ncanana (yellow card) 90+2' | Stadium: Lucas Moripe Stadium |

| 12 April 2024 Quarter-final | University of Pretoria | 1–1 (3–4 p) | Mamelodi Sundowns | Pretoria, GP |
| 19:00 SAST | Abrahams 32'; Gum (yellow card) 69' | | Ribeiro 8'; Kekana (yellow card) 31'; Allende (yellow card) 90+3'; Aubaas (yellow card) 96' | Stadium: Lucas Moripe Stadium |
| | Penalties |
| | T.G. Mokoena (penalty scored); Sekotlong (penalty missed); Mpedi (penalty missed); Majadibodu (penalty scored); Abrahams (penalty scored) | | (penalty scored) Allende; (penalty missed) Sirino; (penalty scored) Ribeiro; (penalty scored) Mvala; (penalty scored) Shalulile |

| 5 May 2024 Semi-final | Stellenbosch | 1–2 | Mamelodi Sundowns | Cape Town, WC |
| 15:00 SAST | Adams (yellow card) 23'; Moloisane (yellow card) 45+11'; Masuluke (yellow card) 77'; Palace 81' | | Lunga (yellow card) 8'; Mudau 11'; Lorch 74'; Esquivel (yellow card) 90+3' | Stadium: Danie Craven Stadium; Referee: Jelly Chavani |

| 1 June 2024 Final | Mamelodi Sundowns | 1–2 | Orlando Pirates | Mbombela |
| 15:00 | Zwane 54' | | Maswanganyi 71' (pen.); Mofokeng 90+4' | Stadium: Mbombela Stadium |

== CAF Champions League ==
=== Qualifying round ===
| 15 September 2023 Second round, first leg | (Burundi) Bumamuru FC | 0–4 | Mamelodi Sundowns | Dar es Salam |
| 16:00 UTC+3 | | | Ribeiro 11', 36' (pen.); Nku 40'; Shalulile 79' | Stadium: Azam Complex Stadium; Referee: Godfrey Nkhankangi (Malawi) |

| 30 September 2023 Second round, second leg | Mamelodi Sundowns | 2–0 | (Burundi) Bumamuru FC | Pretoria, GP |
| 16:00 SAST | Mvala 11'; Mokoena 50' | | | Stadium: Lucas Moripe Stadium; Referee: Antoine Max Depadoux Effa Essouma (Cameroon) |
Note: Mamelodi Sundowns won 6–0 on aggregate

=== Group stage ===
==== Table ====
| Pos | Team | Pld | W | D | L | GF | GA | GD | Pts | Qualification |
|---|---|---|---|---|---|---|---|---|---|---|
| 1 | (South Africa) Mamelodi Sundowns | 6 | 4 | 1 | 1 | 7 | 1 | +6 | 13 | Advance to knockout stage |
| 2 | (Democratic Republic of the Congo) TP Mazembe | 6 | 3 | 1 | 2 | 6 | 2 | +4 | 10 | Advance to knockout stage |
| 3 | (Mauritania) FC Nouadhibou | 6 | 1 | 2 | 3 | 4 | 9 | −5 | 5 (Note: Ranked on head-to-head points: FC Nouadhibou 4, Pyramids 1.) | |
| 4 | (Egypt) Pyramids | 6 | 1 | 2 | 3 | 3 | 8 | −5 | 5 | |

Source: CAF
Rules for classification: Group stage tiebreakers

==== Matches ====
| 26 November 2023 1 | Mamelodi Sundowns | 3–0 | (Mauritania) FC Nouadhibou | Pretoria, GP |
| 15:00 UTC+2 | Costa 22'; Shalulile 28'; Sirino 78' | Report | | Stadium: Loftus Versveld Stadium; Referee: Youcef Gamouh (Algeria) |

| 2 December 2023 2 | (Democratic Republic of the Congo) TP Mazembe | 1–0 | Mamelodi Sundowns | Lubumbashi |
| 15:00 UTC+2 | Likonza 60' | Report | | Stadium: Stade TP Mazembe; Referee: Redouane Jiyed (Morocco) |

| 10 December 2023 3 | Mamelodi Sundowns | 0–0 | (Egypt) Pyramids FC | Pretoria, GP |
| 15:00 UTC+2 | | Report | | Stadium: Loftus Versveld Stadium; Referee: Pierre Atcho (Gabon) |

| 19 December 2023 4 | (Egypt) Pyramids FC | 0–1 | Mamelodi Sundowns | Cairo |
| 18:00 UTC+2 | Mokoena 17' | Report | | Stadium: 30 June Stadium; Referee: Alhadi Allaou Mahamat (Chad) |

| 24 February 2024 5 | FC Nouadhibou (Mauritania) | 0–2 | Mamelodi Sundowns | Stade Cheikha Ould Boïdiya, Nouakchott |
| 16:00 UTC+0 | | Report | Kekana 21'; Lorch 90+1' | Referee: Pacifique Ndabihawenimana (Burundi) |

| 2 March 2024 6 | Mamelodi Sundowns | 1–0 | (Democratic Republic of the Congo) TP Mazembe | Lucas Moripe Stadium, Pretoria |
| 15:00 UTC+2 | Shalulile 38' (pen.) | Report | | Referee: Jalal (Morocco) |

=== Knockout stage ===
| 30 March 2024 Quarter-final, first leg | Young Africans (Tanzania) | 0–0 | Mamelodi Sundowns | Benjamin Mkapa Stadium, Dar es Salaam |
| 21:00 UTC+3 | | Report | | Referee: Amin Omar (Egypt) |

| 5 April 2024 Quarter-final, second leg | Mamelodi Sundowns | 0–0 (3–2 p) | (Tanzania) Young Africans | Loftus Versfeld Stadium, Pretoria |
| 20:00 UTC+2 | | Report | | Referee: Dahane Beida (Mauritania) |
| | Penalties |
| | Allende (penalty scored); Sirino (penalty missed); Costa (penalty scored); Maema (penalty scored) | | (penalty missed) Aziz Ki; (penalty scored) Okrah; (penalty missed) Job; (penalty scored) Gnadou; (penalty missed) Hamad |
Note: 0–0 on aggregate. Mamelodi Sundowns won 3–2 on penalties.

| 20 April 2024 Semi-final, first leg | Espérance de Tunis (Tunisia) | 1–0 | Mamelodi Sundowns | Stade Hammadi Agrebi, Tunis |
| 20:00 UTC+1 | Sasse 41'; M.A. Tougai (yellow card) 62' | Report | Williams (yellow card) 44'; Mudau (yellow card) 45+4' | Referee: Omar Artan (Somalia) |

| 26 April 2024 Semi-final, second leg | Mamelodi Sundowns | 0–1 (0–2 agg.) | (Tunisia) Espérance de Tunis | Loftus Versfeld Stadium, Pretoria |
| 20:00 UTC+2 | Allende (yellow card) 86'; Modiba (yellow card) 90+4' | Report | Bounchniba 57'; Memmiche (yellow card) 66'; Ben Ali (yellow card) 74' | Referee: Issa Sy (Senegal) |

== African Football League ==
=== Quarter Finals ===
| 21 October 2023 1st Leg | Petro de Luanda (Angola) | 0–2 | Mamelodi Sundowns | Estádio 11 de Novembro, Luanda |
| 16:30 UTC+1 | | Report | Allende 67'; Maseko 80' | Attendance: 42,000; Referee: Ibrahim Mutaz (Libya) |

| 24 October 2023 2nd Leg | Mamelodi Sundowns | 0–0 | (Angola) Petro de Luanda | Loftus Versfeld Stadium, Pretoria |
| 19:00 UTC+2 | | Report | | Attendance: 25,000; Referee: Mustapha Ghorbal (Algeria) |
Note: Mamelodi Sundowns won 2–0 on aggregate.

=== Semi Final ===
| 29 October 2023 1st Leg | Mamelodi Sundowns | 1–0 | (Egypt) Al Ahly | Loftus Versfeld Stadium, Pretoria |
| 15:00 UTC+2 | Maseko 52' | Report | | Attendance: 30,000; Referee: Djindo Louis Houngnandande (Benin) |

| 1 November 2023 2nd Leg | Al Ahly (Egypt) | 0–0 | Mamelodi Sundowns | Cairo International Stadium, Cairo |
| 20:00 UTC+2 | | Report | | Attendance: 50,000; Referee: Issa Sy (Senegal) |
Note: Mamelodi Sundowns won 1–0 on aggregate.

=== Final ===
| 5 November 2023 1st Leg | Wydad AC (Morocco) | 2–1 | Mamelodi Sundowns | Stade Mohammed V, Casablanca |
| 19:00 UTC+1 | Coetzee 41' (o.g.); Serrhat 78' | Report | Boutouil 74' (pen.) | Attendance: 45,000; Referee: Mahmood Ismail (Sudan) |

| 12 November 2023 2nd Leg | Mamelodi Sundowns | 2–0 | (Morocco) Wydad AC | Loftus Versfeld Stadium, Pretoria |
| 15:00 UTC+2 | Shalulile 45+3'; Modiba 53' | Report | | Attendance: 50,000; Referee: Jean-Jacques Ndala Ngambo (DR Congo) |
Note: Mamelodi Sundowns win 3–2 on aggregate

== Transfers ==
=== In ===
| Date | Pos | Player | Transferred from | Fee |
|---|---|---|---|---|
| 20 June 2023 | MF | (Argentina) Júnior Mendieta | (South Africa) Stellenbosch | N/A |
| 20 June 2023 | FW | (Brazil) Lucas | (Belgium) Beveren | N/A |

=== Out ===
| Date | Pos | Player | Transferred to | Fee |
|---|---|---|---|---|
| 21 June 2023 | MF | (South Africa) Haashim Domingo | (Morocco) Raja CA | N/A |

== See also ==
- 2022-23 South African Premier Division
- 2022-23 Mamelodi Sundowns F.C. season
