= 2024–25 Mamelodi Sundowns F.C. season =

South African football team season

Mamelodi Sundowns
2024–25 season
- Owner: Patrice Motsepe
- Chairman: Tlhopie Motsepe
- Head coach: Miguel Cardoso
- Stadium: Lucas Masterpieces Moripe Stadium; Loftus Versfeld Stadium
- Premiership: Winner
- MTN 8: Semi-finals
- Nedbank Cup: Semi-finals
- Champions League: Runner-up
- FIFA Club World Cup: Group Stage
Home colours	Away colours	Third colours

The 2024–25 season was Mamelodi Sundowns' 29th consecutive season in the South African Premiership. Sundowns entered the season as defending champions after winning their 17th Premiership title in the preceding season.

Sundowns also competed in the 2024 MTN 8, 2024–25 Nedbank Cup, 2024–25 CAF Champions League, and 2025 FIFA Club World Cup.

== First Team Squad ==
As of 3 February 2025

Note: Flags indicate national team as defined under FIFA eligibility rules; some limited exceptions apply. Players may hold more than one non-FIFA nationality.

No.	Pos.	Nation	Player
1	GK	UGA	Denis Onyango (Captain)
4	MF	RSA	Teboho Mokoena
5	DF	RSA	Mosa Lebusa
6	DF	RSA	Aubrey Modiba
7	MF	ARG	Matías Esquivel
9	FW	BRA	Arthur Sales
10	FW	BRA	Lucas Ribeiro
11	MF	CHI	Marcelo Allende
12	MF	RSA	Neo Maema
13	FW	RSA	Iqraam Rayners
14	DF	RSA	Terrence Mashego
15	MF	RSA	Bathusi Aubaas
17	FW	RSA	Tashreeq Matthews
18	MF	RSA	Themba Zwane
19	FW	RSA	Kobamelo Kodisang
20	DF	RSA	Grant Kekana
21	MF	RSA	Sphelele Mkhulise

No.	Pos.	Nation	Player
22	FW	RSA	Siyabonga Mabena
25	DF	RSA	Khuliso Mudau
26	GK	RSA	Reyaad Pieterse
27	DF	RSA	Thapelo Morena
28	DF	RSA	Zuko Mdunyelwa
29	DF	ZIM	Divine Lunga
30	GK	RSA	Ronwen Williams
31	DF	RSA	Asekho Tiwani
32	DF	ARG	Lucas Suárez (on loan from Talleres)
33	FW	RSA	Thapelo Maseko
34	DF	RSA	Mothobi Mvala
35	MF	RSA	Ntando Nkosi
36	GK	RSA	Jody February
37	DF	RSA	Kegan Johannes
38	FW	NAM	Peter Shalulile
40	MF	RSA	Rivaldo Coetzee
42	DF	RSA	Malibongwe Khoza
43	FW	RSA	Kutlwano Lethlaku
44	MF	RSA	Jayden Adams
50	GK	RSA	Sanele Tshabalala
—	DF	RSA	Keanu Cupido

=== Transfers In ===
Pos.	Player	Transferred from	Fee/notes	Date
MF	(South Africa) Jayden Adams	(South Africa) Stellenbosch	Transfer	January 17, 2025
DF	(South Africa) Keanu Cupido	(South Africa) Cape Town City	Transfer	January 26, 2025
DF	(Argentina) Lucas Suárez	(Argentina) Talleres de Córdoba	Loan	January 29, 2025
MF	(Argentina) Matías Esquivel	(Argentina) Talleres de Córdoba	End of Loan	February 2, 2025

== Competitions ==
=== Premiership ===
==== League Position ====
Pos	Team	Pld	W	D	L	GF	GA	GD	Pts	Qualification or relegation
1	Mamelodi Sundowns (C)	28	24	1	3	65	13	+52	73	Qualification for 2025–26 CAF Champions League
2	Orlando Pirates	28	19	4	5	43	20	+23	61	Qualification for 2025–26 CAF Champions League
3	Stellenbosch	28	13	9	6	34	21	+13	48	Qualification for 2025–26 CAF Confederation Cup
4	Sekhukhune United	28	13	7	8	39	31	+8	46	
5	TS Galaxy	28	8	11	9	30	30	0	35	

Source: Premier Soccer League
(C) Champions

==== Matches ====
17 September 2024 1	Mamelodi Sundowns	2–0	SuperSport United	Pretoria
	Rayners 62'; Ribeiro 65'	Report		Stadium: Loftus Versfeld

24 September 2024 3	Mamelodi Sundowns	4–1	Marumo Gallants	Pretoria
	Matthews 9'; Rayners 34'; Ribeiro 48'; Mkhulise 71'	Report	Mhango 88'	Stadium: Loftus Versfeld

28 September 2024 4	Kaizer Chiefs	1–2	Mamelodi Sundowns	Johannesburg
	Chivaviro 9'	Report	Ribeiro 31'; Rayners 37'	Stadium: FNB Stadium

23 October 2024 12	Mamelodi Sundowns	2–1	Royal AM	Pretoria
	Mkhulise 6'; Mudau 85'	Report	Zulu 90+2'	Stadium: Loftus Versfeld

27 October 2024 5	Polokwane City	1–0	Mamelodi Sundowns	Polokwane
	Nikani 82'	Report		Stadium: Old Peter Mokaba Stadium

30 October 2024 6	Mamelodi Sundowns	3–0	Cape Town City	Pretoria
	Shalulile 16', 22'; Ribeiro 37'	Report		Stadium: Loftus Versfeld

6 November 2024 17	Mamelodi Sundowns	2–0	Polokwane City	Pretoria
	Letlhaku 27', 69'	Report		Stadium: Loftus Versfeld

30 November 2024 7	Mamelodi Sundowns	3–0	Sekhukhune	Pretoria
	Yamba 22' (o.g.); Sales 49' (pen.); Rayners 90'	Report		Stadium: Loftus Versfeld

18 December 2024 10	Stellenbosch	0–1	Mamelodi Sundowns	Stellenbosch
		Report	Rayners 18'	Stadium: Danie Craven Stadium

24 December 2024 8	AmaZulu	0–1	Mamelodi Sundowns	Durban
		Report	Rayners 90'	Stadium: Princess Magogo Stadium

28 December 2024 11	Richards Bay	0–2	Mamelodi Sundowns	Durban
		Report	Sales 19'; Ribeiro 66'	Stadium: King Zwelithini Stadium

22 January 2025 14	Magesi	1–2	Mamelodi Sundowns	Polokwane
	Makhubu 12'	Report	Ribeiro 64'; Matthews 86'	Stadium: Old Peter Mokaba Stadium

2 February 2025 15	Mamelodi Sundowns	4–0	Golden Arrows	Pretoria
	Ribeiro 44' (pen.)); Shalulile 65', 80'; Mokoena 85'	Report		Stadium: Lucas Masterpieces Moripe Stadium

5 February 2025 16	SuperSport United	0–3	Mamelodi Sundowns	Pretoria
		Report	Adams 11'; Matthews 44', 49'	Stadium: Lucas Masterpieces Moripe Stadium

8 February 2025 13	Mamelodi Sundowns	4–1	Orlando Pirates	Pretoria
	Kekana 13'; Ribeiro 27', 59'; Mokoena 78'	Report	Hotto 57'	Stadium: Loftus Versfeld

11 February 2025 2	TS Galaxy	1–0	Mamelodi Sundowns	Mbombela
	Sebelebele 41'	Report		Stadium: Mbombela Stadium

19 February 2025 18	Marumo Gallants	1–3	Mamelodi Sundowns	Thohoyandou
	Dion 37'	Report	Allende 51'; Ribeiro 79'; Rayners 81'	Stadium: Thohoyandou Stadium

22 February 2025 19	Mamelodi Sundowns	4–1	TS Galaxy	Pretoria
	Shalulile 1'; Rayners 7', 48'; Adams 38'	Report	Mahlangu 10'	Stadium: Lucas Masterpieces Moripe Stadium

26 February 2025 24	Sekhukhune	2–4	Mamelodi Sundowns	Polokwane
	Otladisa 35'; Makgalwa 69'	Report	Morena 16'; Suárez 39'; Ribeiro 55'; Sales 66'	Stadium: Old Peter Mokaba Stadium

1 March 2025 20	Mamelodi Sundowns	1–0	Kaizer Chiefs	Pretoria
	Ribeiro 41'	Report		Stadium: Lucas Masterpieces Moripe Stadium

5 March 2025 21	Golden Arrows	1–1	Mamelodi Sundowns	Durban
	Phillips 31'	Report	Ribeiro 44' (pen.)	Stadium: Sugar Ray Xulu Stadium

11 March 2025 22	Mamelodi Sundowns	2–0	AmaZulu	Pretoria
	Shalulile 51'; Sales 88'	Report		Stadium: Lucas Masterpieces Moripe Stadium

16 March 2025 23	Orlando Pirates	2–1	Mamelodi Sundowns	Johannesburg
	Mofokeng 4', 5'		Mudau 66'	Stadium: FNB Stadium

30 April 2025 27	Mamelodi Sundowns	3–0	Richards Bay	Pretoria
	Sales 8'; Rayners 28'; Allende 48'	Report		Stadium: Lucas Masterpieces Moripe Stadium

3 May 2025 28	Cape Town City	0–2	Mamelodi Sundowns	Cape Town
20:00		Report	Matthews 34'; Rayners 77'	Stadium: Cape Town Stadium

7 May 2025 9	Mamelodi Sundowns	3–0	Chippa United	Pretoria
	Rayners 29'; Adams 40'; Maseko 81'	Report		Stadium: Loftus Versfeld

11 May 2025 25	Mamelodi Sundowns	3–0	Stellenbosch	Pretoria
	Ribiero 6'; Rayners 12'; Sales 18'	Report		Stadium: Lucas Masterpieces Moripe Stadium

14 May 2025 30	Chippa United	0–3	Mamelodi Sundowns	East London
19:30		Report	Rayners 11'; Sales 69', 89'	Stadium: Buffalo City Stadium

18 May 2025 29	Mamelodi Sundowns	2–0	Magesi	Pretoria
17:30	Ribeiro 4', 22'	Report		Stadium: Loftus Versfeld

=== MTN 8 ===
11 August 2024 Quarterfinals	Mamelodi Sundowns	1–0 (a.e.t.)	Polokwane City	Pretoria
	Matuludi 101'	Report		Stadium: Lucas Moripe Stadium

28 August 2024 Semi-finals; 1st Leg	Mamelodi Sundowns	0–1	Stellenbosch	Pretoria
		Report	Rayners 62'	Stadium: Lucas Masterpieces Moripe Stadium

1 September 2024 Semi-finals; 2nd Leg	Stellenbosch	1–0 (2–0 agg.)	Mamelodi Sundowns	Durban
	Mojela 49'	Report		Stadium: Moses Mabhida Stadium

=== Nedbank Cup ===
25 January 2025 Round of 32	Mamelodi Sundowns	5–2	Sibanye Golden Stars	Pretoria
18:00 SAST				Stadium: Loftus Versfeld

16 February 2025 Round of 16	Mamelodi Sundowns	2–0	Mpheni Home Defenders	Pretoria
	Matthews 8'; Aubaas 27'	Report		Stadium: Loftus Versfeld Stadium

28 March 2025 Quarter-finals	Mamelodi Sundowns	1–0 (a.e.t.)	Sekhukhune United	Pretoria
20:00 SAST	Jayden Adams 119'			Stadium: Lucas Masterpieces Moripe Stadium

13 April 2025 Semi-finals	Mamelodi Sundowns	1-2	Kaizer Chiefs	Pretoria
18:00 SAST	Teboho Mokoena 45'		Wandile Duba 57'; Ashley Du Preez 89'	Stadium: Loftus Versfeld Stadium

=== CAF Champions League ===
==== Qualifying Rounds ====
14 September 2024 Second Round; First Leg	Mbabane Swallows (Eswatini)	0–4	(South Africa) Mamelodi Sundowns	Pretoria
20:00 UTC+2		Report	Ribeiro 3' (pen.), 53'; Lebusa 17'; Rayners 40'	Stadium: Lucas Moripe Stadium; Referee: Omar Artan (Somalia)

21 September 2024 Second Round; Second Leg	Mamelodi Sundowns (South Africa)	4–0 (8–0 agg.)	(Eswatini) Mbabane Swallows	Pretoria
18:00 UTC+2	Kodisang 42'; Khoza 60'; Lorch 63'; Mkhulise 67'	Report		Stadium: Lucas Moripe Stadium; Referee: Sadok Selmi (Tunisia)

==== Group Stage ====
The group stage draw was held on 7 October 2024.

Pos	Team	Pld	W	D	L	GF	GA	GD	Pts	Qualification	FAR	MSFC	RCA	MUN
1	(Morocco) AS FAR	6	2	4	0	8	4	+4	10	Advance to knockout stage	—	1–1	1–1	2–0
2	(South Africa) Mamelodi Sundowns	6	2	3	1	5	4	+1	9	Advance to knockout stage	1–1	—	1–0	0–0
3	(Morocco) Raja CA	6	2	2	2	4	5	−1	8		0–2	1–0	—	1–0
4	(Democratic Republic of the Congo) AS Maniema Union	6	0	3	3	3	7	−4	3		1–1	1–2	1–1	—

Source: CAF
Rules for classification: Group stage tiebreakers

26 November 2024 1	Mamelodi Sundowns (South Africa)	0–0	(Democratic Republic of the Congo) AS Maniema Union	Pretoria
18:00 UTC+2		Report		Stadium: Loftus Versfeld Stadium; Referee: Mohamed Maarouf (Egypt)

7 December 2024 2	AS FAR (Morocco)	1–1	(South Africa) Mamelodi Sundowns	El Jadida
20:00 UTC+1	Hrimat 74'	Report	Rayners 66'	Stadium: Ben M'Hamed El Abdi Stadium; Referee: Dahane Beida (Mauritania)

15 December 2024 3	Mamelodi Sundowns (South Africa)	1–0	(Morocco) Raja CA	Pretoria
15:00 UTC+2	Rayners 65'	Report		Stadium: Loftus Versfeld Stadium; Referee: Pierre Atcho (Gabon)

4 January 2025 4	Raja CA (Morocco)	1–0	(South Africa) Mamelodi Sundowns	Casablanca
20:00 UTC+1	Benamar 45+2'	Report		Stadium: Larbi Zaouli Stadium; Referee: Abdel Aziz Mohamed Bouh (Mauritania)

11 January 2025 5	AS Maniema Union (Democratic Republic of the Congo)	1–2	(South Africa) Mamelodi Sundowns	Kinshasa
14:00 UTC+1	Kitambala 38'	Report	Shalulile 83'; Moanda 90+5' (o.g.)	Stadium: Stade des Martyrs; Referee: Issa Sy (Senegal)

19 January 2025 6	Mamelodi Sundowns (South Africa)	1–1	(Morocco) AS FAR	Pretoria
18:00 UTC+2	Shalulile 12'	Report	Zouhzouh 83'	Stadium: Loftus Versfeld Stadium; Referee: Peter Waweru (Kenya)

==== Knockout Stage ====
===== Quarter-finals =====
1 April 2025 First Leg	Mamelodi Sundowns (South Africa)	1–0	(Tunisia) Espérance de Tunis	Pretoria
15:00 UTC+2	Shalulile 54'	Report		Stadium: Loftus Versfeld Stadium; Referee: Jean-Jacques Ndala Ngambo (DR Congo)

8 April 2025 Second Leg	Espérance de Tunis (Tunisia)	0–0 (0–1 agg.)	(South Africa) Mamelodi Sundowns	Tunis
20:00 UTC+1		Report		Stadium: Stade Hammadi Agrebi; Referee: Issa Sy (Senegal)

===== Semi-finals =====
19 April 2025 First Leg	Mamelodi Sundowns (South Africa)	0–0	(Egypt) Al Ahly	Pretoria, South Africa
15:00 UTC+2		Report		Stadium: Loftus Versfeld Stadium; Referee: Omar Artan (Somalia)

25 April 2025 Second Leg	Al Ahly (Egypt)	1–1 (1–1 (a) agg.)	(South Africa) Mamelodi Sundowns	Cairo, Egypt
19:00 UTC+3	Mohamed 24'	Report	Ibrahim 90' (o.g.)	Stadium: Cairo International Stadium; Referee: Dahane Beida (Mauritania)

===== Final =====
24 May 2025 First leg	Mamelodi Sundowns (South Africa)	1–1	(Egypt) Pyramids	Pretoria
15:00 UTC+2	Costa 54'	Report	El Karti 90+4'	Stadium: Loftus Versfeld Stadium; Referee: Mahmood Ismail (Sudan)

1 June 2025 Second leg	Pyramids (Egypt)	2–1 (3–2 agg.)	(South Africa) Mamelodi Sundowns	Cairo, Egypt
--:--	Mayele 23'; Samy 56'	Report	Rayners 75'	Stadium: 30 June Stadium; Attendance: 25,000; Referee: Omar Artan (Somalia)

=== FIFA Club World Cup ===
==== Group Stage ====
Pos	Team	Pld	W	D	L	GF	GA	GD	Pts	Qualification
1	(Germany) Borussia Dortmund	3	2	1	0	5	3	+2	7	Advance to knockout stage
2	(Brazil) Fluminense	3	1	2	0	4	2	+2	5	Advance to knockout stage
3	(South Africa) Mamelodi Sundowns	3	1	1	1	4	4	0	4	
4	(South Korea) Ulsan HD	3	0	0	3	2	6	−4	0	

Source: FIFA
Rules for classification: Group stage tiebreakers

17 June 2025 1	Ulsan HD (South Korea)	0–1	(South Africa) Mamelodi Sundowns	Orlando, United States
7:05 pm EDT (Note: The Ulsan HD vs Mamelodi Sundowns match, originally scheduled for 6:00 pm EDT, was delayed to 7:05 pm due to adverse weather conditions.)	Bojanić (yellow card) 55'	Report	Rayners 36'; Mokoena (yellow card) 85'	Stadium: Inter&Co Stadium; Attendance: 3,412; Referee: Clément Turpin (France)

21 June 2025 2	Mamelodi Sundowns (South Africa)	3–4	(Germany) Borussia Dortmund	Cincinnati, United States
12:00 EDT (UTC−4)	Ribeiro 11'; Rayners 62'; Matthews (yellow card) 66'; Mothiba 90'; Allende (yellow card) 90+5'	Report	Nmecha 16'; Guirassy 34'; Bellingham 45'; Mudau 59' (o.g.); Chukwuemeka (yellow card) 64'; Beier (yellow card) 85'	Stadium: TQL Stadium; Attendance: 14,006; Referee: Juan Gabriel Benítez (Paraguay)

25 June 2025 3	Mamelodi Sundowns (South Africa)	0–0	(Brazil) Fluminense	Miami Gardens, United States
15:00 EDT (UTC−4)	Mokoena (yellow card) 10'; Letlhaku (yellow card) 90+6'	Report	Arias (yellow card) 88'; Bernal (yellow card) 89'; Renê (yellow card) 90+5'	Stadium: Hard Rock Stadium; Attendance: 14,312; Referee: Anthony Taylor (England)
