= Chabalala =

Chabalala may refer to:

- Chabalala (Angolan footballer), also Tshabalala (born 1999), birth name Gaspar Necas Fortunato, Angolan footballer
- Justice Chabalala (born 1991), South African footballer
- Kingsol Chabalala (born 1976), South African politician and a Member of the Gauteng Provincial Legislature
- Tonic Chabalala (born 1979), South African footballer

== See also ==
- Shabalala
