= Thapelo Maseko =

South African football player (born 2003)

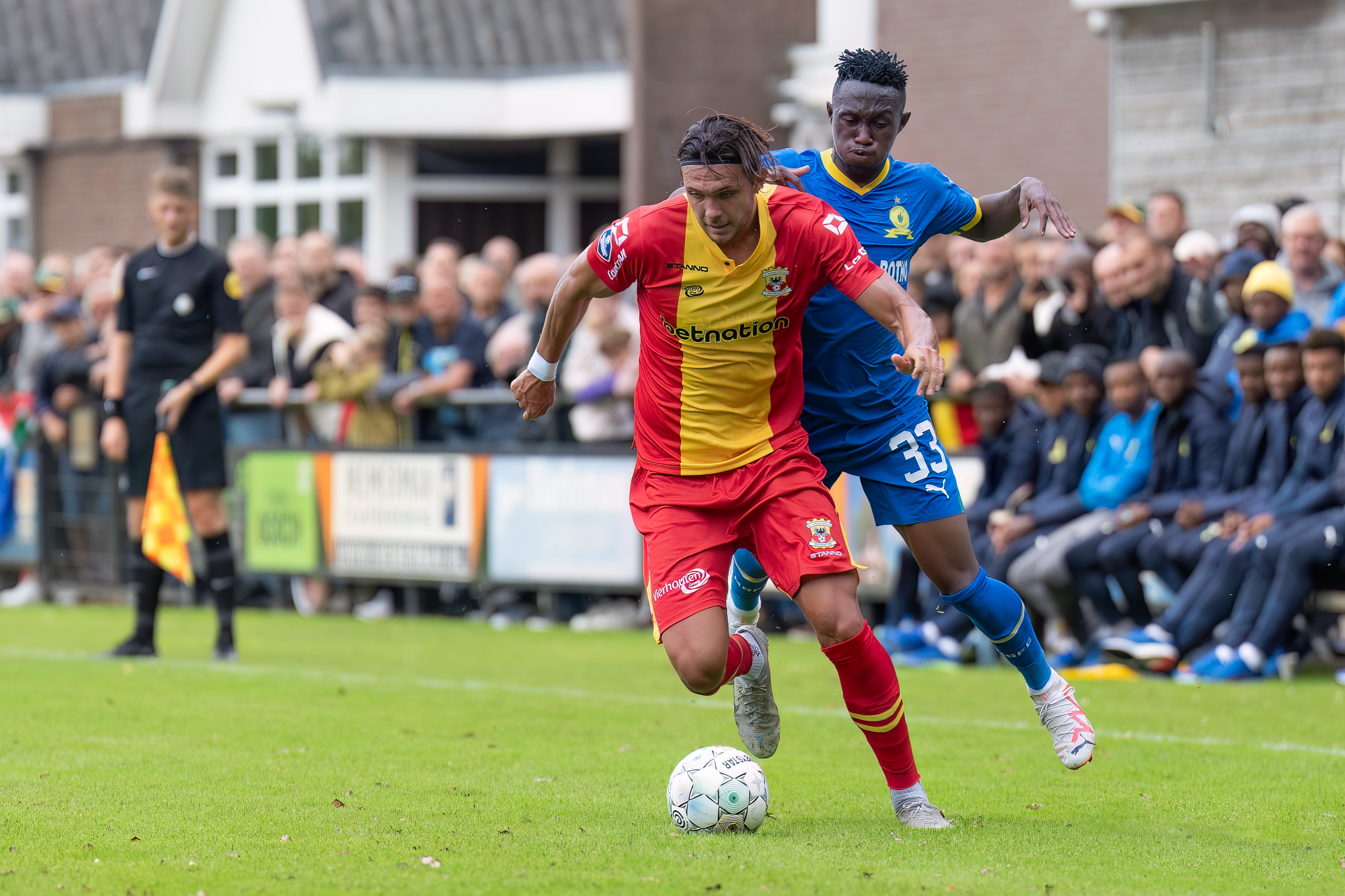
- Maseko (in blue) with Mamelodi Sundowns in 2023

Personal information
- Date of birth: 11 November 2003 (age 22)
- Place of birth: Sebokeng, Gauteng, South Africa
- Height: 1.78 m (5 ft 10 in)
- Position: Winger

Team information
- Current team: Copenhagen
- Number: 12

Youth career
- –2021: SuperSport United

Senior career*
Years	Team	Apps	(Gls)
2021–2023	SuperSport United	32	(4)
2023–2026	Mamelodi Sundowns	19	(1)
2026	→ AEL Limassol (loan)	12	(1)
2026–	Copenhagen	6	(2)

International career^{‡}
2023	South Africa U23	2	(1)
2022–	South Africa	14	(2)
- * Club domestic league appearances and goals as of 18 October 2026 ‡ National team caps and goals as of 29 June 2026

Thapelo Maseko (born 11 November 2003) is a South African professional Association football player who plays as a forward for Copenhagen in the Danish Superliga and the South Africa national team.

== Club career ==
Maseko is a youth product of SuperSport United F.C., where he started his professional career. He impressed during the 2022–23 season, as he helped SuperSport to a third-place finish in the South African top league. This reportedly earned him offers from the likes of Belgian club KVC Westerlo.

=== Mamelodi Sundowns ===
In June 2023, he signed for the Mamelodi Sundowns, the record 13 time-winners of the Premier League. He played a fundamental role in the team that won the first African Football League in 2023, most notably scoring the only goal of the two semi-final legs against Al Ahly. He was the best player and top goal scorer of the competition.

==== AEL Limassol ====
He was loaned to Cypriot First Division side AEL Limassol for the rest of the 2025/26 season in the January transfer. He became the first player from the Cypriot League to score at a FIFA World Cup in 2026.

=== F.C. Copenhagen ===
In August 2026 he signed for Danish Superliga side F.C. Copenhagen on a three-year loan for a fee of R28 million (€1.5million). He scored a brace on his first start for the club in a 5-0 win over OB in the Superliga.

== International career ==
Maseko is an international for South Africa, having played the 2022 COSAFA Cup. In January 2024, he was selected with South Africa for the 2023 AFCON.

On 28 May 2026, he was selected by manager Hugo Broos to represent his nation at the 2026 FIFA World Cup.

He scored the winning goal and was named Man of the Match in a 1–0 victory over South Korea in the third group-stage match, securing his country's first-ever qualification for the World Cup knockout stage. At 22 years and 225 days, he became the second-youngest World Cup goalscorer in South Africa's history, behind only Benni McCarthy.

== Career statistics ==
=== Club ===
As of match played 18 October 2026

Appearances by club, season and competition
Club	Season	League			Cup		League Cup		Continental		Other		Total	
Club	Season	Division	Apps	Goals	Apps	Goals	Apps	Goals	Apps	Goals	Apps	Goals	Apps	Goals
SuperSport United	2021–22	South African Premiership	8	0	1	0	0	0	—		—		9	0
SuperSport United	2022–23	South African Premiership	24	4	1	0	0	0	—		—		25	4
SuperSport United	Total		32	4	2	0	0	0	—		—		34	4
Mamelodi Sundowns	2023–24	South African Premiership	6	2	1	0	3	0	7 (Note: Appearances in CAF Champions League)	0	7 (Note: One appearance in Carling Knockout Cup, six appearances and two goals in African Football League)	2	24	4
Mamelodi Sundowns	2024–25	South African Premiership	8	1	1	0	1	0	3	0	1 (Note: Appearance in Carling Knockout Cup)	0	14	1
Mamelodi Sundowns	2025–26	South African Premiership	5	0	0	0	1	0	1	0	—		7	0
Mamelodi Sundowns	Total		19	3	2	0	5	0	11	0	8	2	45	5
AEL Limassol (loan)	2025–26	Cypriot First Division	12	1	3	1	—		—		—		15	2
Copenhagen	2026–27	Danish Superliga	6	2	1	0	—		2 (Note: Appearances in UEFA Conference League)	0	—		9	1
Career total			68	8	8	1	5	0	13	0	8	2	102	11

=== International ===
As of match played 29 June 2026

Appearances and goals by national team and year
National team	Year	Apps	Goals
South Africa	2022	2	0
South Africa	2024	6	1
South Africa	2026	6	1
Total		14	2

Scores and results list South Africa's goal tally first, score column indicates score after each Maseko goal.

List of international goals scored by Thapelo Maseko
No.	Date	Venue	Opponent	Score	Result	Competition	Ref.
1	21 January 2024	Amadou Gon Coulibaly Stadium, Korhogo, Ivory Coast	Namibia	4–0	4–0	2023 Africa Cup of Nations	
2	24 June 2026	Estadio BBVA, Monterrey, Mexico	South Korea	1–0	1–0	2026 FIFA World Cup	

== Honours ==
Mamelodi Sundowns

- African Football League: 2023
- South African Premiership: 2023-24; 2024-25

South Africa

- Africa Cup of Nations third place: 2023

Individual

- African Football League Best Player: 2023
- African Football League Top Goalscorer: 2023
