= Shabalala =

Shabalala may refer to:

- Headman Shabalala (1945–1991), member of Ladysmith Black Mambazo, a South African choral group founded by his brother Joseph
- Jockey Shabalala (1943–2006), member of Ladysmith Black Mambazo, a South African choral group founded by his brother Joseph
- Joseph Shabalala (1941–2020), founder and musical director of the South African choral group Ladysmith Black Mambazo
- Lizzie Shabalala, South African politician
- Msizi Shabalala (born 1964), member of Ladysmith Black Mambazo, a South African choral group founded in 1960 by his father Joseph
- Nellie Shabalala (1953–2002), the wife of Ladysmith Black Mambazo (LBM) leader and founder, Joseph Shabalala, for more than 30 years
- Nomvuzo Shabalala (1960–2020), South African politician
- Sibongiseni Shabalala (born 1972), member of Ladysmith Black Mambazo, a South African choral group founded in 1960 by his father Joseph
- Thamsanqa Shabalala (born 1974), member of Ladysmith Black Mambazo, a South African choral group founded in 1960 by his father Joseph
- Thulani Shabalala (born 1968), member of Ladysmith Black Mambazo, a South African choral group founded in 1960 by his father Joseph
- Nhlanhla Shabalala (born 1985), South African football (soccer) midfielder for Premier Soccer League club Ajax Cape Town

== See also ==
- Chabalala
- Shalala (broadcaster)
