= Lucas Ribeiro (footballer, born 1998) =

Brazilian footballer (born 1998)

Personal information
- Full name: Lucas William Ribeiro Costa
- Date of birth: 9 October 1998 (age 28)
- Place of birth: Santa Helena, Maranhão, Brazil
- Height: 1.81 m (5 ft 11 in)
- Position: Forward

Team information
- Current team: Espérance de Tunis
- Number: 10

Youth career
- Pinheiro
- 2017–2018: Valenciennes

Senior career*
Years	Team	Apps	(Gls)
2018–2019	Valenciennes	0	(0)
2019–2020	Virton	8	(4)
2020–2022	Royal Charleroi	8	(0)
2021	→ RWDM Brussels (loan)	11	(0)
2021–2022	→ Mouscron (loan)	15	(5)
2022	→ Beveren (loan)	10	(2)
2022–2023	Beveren	31	(11)
2023–2025	Mamelodi Sundowns	44	(28)
2025–2026	Cultural Leonesa	27	(5)
2026	Al Ittihad Tripoli	0	(0)
2026–	Espérance de Tunis	6	(0)
- * Club domestic league appearances and goals as of 22 November 2026

Lucas William Ribeiro Costa (born 9 October 1998) is a Brazilian professional footballer who plays as a forward for Tunisian Ligue Professionnelle 1 club Espérance de Tunis.

== Professional career ==
A youth product of Pinheiros, Ribeiro moved to France with Valenciennes and made his professional debut with Virton in a 3–2 Belgian First Division B win over Roeselare on 27 October 2019.

On 30 June 2020, Ribeiro signed for Charleroi. He left on 1 February 2021, joining Belgian First Division B club RWDM on loan until the end of the season.

On 11 August 2021, Ribeiro joined Mouscron on a season-long loan with an option to buy. On 19 January 2022, he was loaned again to Waasland-Beveren until the end of the season. Beveren triggered the option to buy on 6 April and Ribeiro signed a two-year contract with the club.

On 6 July 2023, Mamelodi Sundowns confirmed Ribeiro's signing for an undisclosed fee. He made his debut on 4 August in the Premiership in a 2–1 victory over Sekhukhune United, scoring in the 57th minute, and helped the Sundowns win the African Football League later in the year. He won the 2024–25 player of the month awards for September, October, January, February, and May.

Ribeiro was a part of Mamelodi Sundowns' 2025 FIFA Club World Cup squad. On 21 June 2025, against Borussia Dortmund, he ran 67 yards past two opposing defenders and slotted the ball beyond Gregor Kobel to open the scoring in an eventual 3–4 loss. His goal was later voted as the goal of the tournament by FIFA.

In August 2025, Ribeiro terminated his contract with Mamelodi Sundowns and took the matter up with FIFA for his release from the club. On 12 September 2025, he moved to Spanish second division side Cultural y Deportiva Leonesa.

On 13 August 2026, Ribeiro officially completed his transfer to Tunisian club Espérance de Tunis. Espérance vice-president Chokri El Ouaer traveled to Libya to meet with Al-Ittihad SC executive director Abdelmajid Saleh, where both delegations finalized all arrangements for the transfer, securing the Brazilian forward on a three-year contract.

== Career statistics ==
As of 22 November 2026

Appearances and goals by club, season and competition
Club	Season	League			National cup (Note: Includes Coupe de France, Belgian Cup, Nedbank Cup, Copa del Rey and Tunisian Cup)		League cup (Note: Includes Coupe de la Ligue, Carling Knockout Cup and MTN 8)		Continental		Other		Total	
Club	Season	Division	Apps	Goals	Apps	Goals	Apps	Goals	Apps	Goals	Apps	Goals	Apps	Goals
Valenciennes	2018–19	Ligue 2	0	0	1	1	0	0	—		—		1	1
Virton	2019–20	Belgian First Division B	8	4	0	0	—		—		—		8	4
Royal Charleroi	2020–21	Belgian First Division A	8	0	0	0	—		2 (Note: Appearances in UEFA Europa League)	0	—		10	0
RWDM Brussels (loan)	2020–21	Belgian First Division B	11	0	1	0	—		—		—		12	0
Mouscron (loan)	2021–22	Belgian First Division B	15	5	1	1	—		—		—		16	6
Beveren (loan)	2021–22	Belgian First Division B	10	2	0	0	—		—		—		10	2
Beveren	2022–23	Challenger Pro League	31	11	2	0	—		—		—		33	11
Beveren	Total		41	13	2	0	—		—		—		43	13
Mamelodi Sundowns	2023–24	South African Premiership	18	12	3	1	3 (Note: Appearances in MTN 8)	0	12 (Note: Appearance(s) in CAF Champions League)	3	1 (Note: Appearance in African Football League)	0	37	16
Mamelodi Sundowns	2024–25	South African Premiership	26	16	2	0	7 (Note: Four appearances and one goal in Carling Knockout Cup, three appearances in MTN 8)	1	13	3	3 (Note: Appearances in FIFA Club World Cup)	1	51	21
Mamelodi Sundowns	Total		44	28	5	1	10	1	25	6	4	1	88	37
Cultural Leonesa	2025–26	Segunda División	27	5	4	1	—		—		—		31	6
Al Ittihad Tripoli	2026–27	Libyan Premier League	—		—		—		—		—		0	0
Espérance de Tunis	2026–27	Tunisian Ligue Professionnelle 1	6	0	0	0	—		1	0	0	0	7	0
Career total			160	55	14	4	10	1	28	6	4	1	216	67

== Honours ==
Type	Honour	Year(s)
Club (Mamelodi Sundowns)	South African Premiership	2023–24, 2024–25
Club (Mamelodi Sundowns)	African Football League	2023
Individual	2024–25 South African Premiership Player of the Month	September, October, January, February, May
Individual	FIFA Club World Cup Goal of the Tournament	2025
Individual	South African Premiership Golden Boot	2024–25
Individual	South African Premiership Goal of the Season	2024–25
Individual	South African Premiership Player's Player of the Season	2024–25
Individual	South African Premiership PSL Footballer of the Season	2024–25
