= Shadrack Kobedi =

South African soccer player

Personal information
- Date of birth: 20 November 1995 (age 30)
- Position: Midfielder

Team information
- Current team: Royal AM
- Number: 6

Senior career*
Years	Team	Apps	(Gls)
2019–2021	Bloemfontein Celtic	17	(0)
2020	→ TS Sporting (loan)	14	(0)
2021–	Royal AM	40	(0)

International career^{‡}
2019–	South Africa	2	(0)
- * Club domestic league appearances and goals as of 7 July 2024 ‡ National team caps and goals as of 7 July 2023

Shadrack Kobedi (born 20 November 1995) is a South African soccer player who plays as a midfielder for South African Premier Division side Royal AM.

== Club career ==
He joined TS Sporting on loan from Bloemfontein Celtic in January 2020, on a deal until the end of the season.
