= 2018–19 Nedbank Cup =

ke yona (the one)

Tournament details
- Country: South Africa

Final positions
- Champions: TS Galaxy(1st title)
- Runners-up: Kaizer Chiefs

Tournament statistics
- Matches played: 7
- Goals scored: 19 (2.71 per match)
- Top goal scorer(s): (4 goals) (South Africa) Zakhele Lepasa

The 2018–19 Nedbank Cup was the 2018–19 edition of South Africa's premier knockout club football (soccer) competition, the Nedbank Cup.

== Quarter-finals ==
27 March 2019

Cape Umoya United	1–2	TS Galaxy

Cape Town

30 March 2020

Bloemfontein Celtic	1–2	Golden Arrows

Bloemfontein

30 March 2020

Bidvest Wits	0–0	Chippa United
Penalties
	7–9

Johannesburg

31 March 2019

Kaizer Chiefs	2–0	Cape Town City

FNB Stadium, Jo'burg

== Semi-final ==
20 April 2020

Golden Arrows	1–3 (a.e.t.)	TS Galaxy

KaNyamazane Stadium, Durban

20 April 2020

Chippa United	2–4	Kaizer Chiefs

Nelson Mandela Bay Stadium, Port Elizabeth

== Final ==
18 May 2019
19:00

TS Galaxy	1–0	Kaizer Chiefs
Z. Lapasa 90+2'

Moses Mabhida Stadium, Durban
Referee: Abongile Tom
- TS Galaxy became the first club from the second tier to win South Africa's national cup.
