= Asenele Velebayi =

South African footballer

Personal information
- Date of birth: 11 December 2002 (age 23)
- Place of birth: Philippi, Cape Town
- Height: 1.69 m (5 ft 7 in)
- Position: Midfielder

Team information
- Current team: Kaizer Chiefs
- Number: 17

Youth career
- –2019: Ajax Cape Town

Senior career*
Years	Team	Apps	(Gls)
2019–2025	Cape Town Spurs	101	(6)
2025–	Kaizer Chiefs	3	(0)

International career^{‡}
2024–	South Africa A	3	(0)
- * Club domestic league appearances and goals as of 4 January 2026 ‡ National team caps and goals as of 19 December 2024

Asenele Velebayi (born 11 December 2002) is a South African soccer player currently playing as a midfielder for Kaizer Chiefs.

After the 2024 season concluded, he was selected for the 2024 COSAFA Cup. He made his Bafana Bafana debut against Mozambique.

== Career statistics ==
=== Club ===
As of 21 July 2020.

Appearances and goals by club, season and competition
Club	Season	League			National Cup		League Cup		Other		Total	
Club	Season	Division	Apps	Goals	Apps	Goals	Apps	Goals	Apps	Goals	Apps	Goals
Ajax Cape Town	2019–20	National First Division	10	0	0	0	0	0	0	0	10	0
Career total			10	0	0	0	0	0	0	0	10	0
