= Katlego Otladisa =

South African soccer player

Personal information
- Date of birth: 22 September 1996 (age 30)
- Place of birth: North West, South Africa
- Height: 1.76 m (5 ft 9 in)
- Position: Midfielder

Team information
- Current team: Marumo Gallants
- Number: 12

Senior career*
Years	Team	Apps	(Gls)
2017–2018	Platinum Stars	8	(1)
2018–2021	Mamelodi Sundowns	0	(0)
2018–2019	→ Cape Umoya United (loan)	10	(1)
2019–2020	→ Cape Town Spurs (loan)	18	(0)
2021–2023	Marumo Gallants	57	(1)
2023–	Orlando Pirates	9	(0)
2025	→ Sekhukhune United (loan)	9	(1)
2025–	Marumo Gallants	5	(0)

International career^{‡}
2019–	South Africa U20	5	(2)
- * Club domestic league appearances and goals as of 4 January 2026 ‡ National team caps and goals as of 12 June 2023

Katlego Otladisa (born 22 September 1996) is a South African professional soccer player who plays as a midfielder for Marumo Gallants.

== Career ==
Otladisa debuted with the Platinum Stars F.C. in 2017. Late in the year, he experienced fractures in his left tibia and fibula. He later played for Cape Umoya United F.C. (2018–19),Cape Town Spurs F.C. (2019–20), and Marumo Gallants F.C. (2021–23). In 2023, he transferred to the Orlando Pirates F.C.
