= Marks Munyai =

South African soccer player

Personal information
- Date of birth: 27 May 1991 (age 35)
- Place of birth: Masakona, South Africa
- Position: Midfielder

Team information
- Current team: TS Galaxy
- Number: 23

Senior career*
Years	Team	Apps	(Gls)
2013–2019	Black Leopards	119	(4)
2019–2020	Highlands Park	17	(0)
2020–	TS Galaxy	81	(1)
- * Club domestic league appearances and goals as of 1 August 2024

Marks Munyai (born 27 May 1991) is a South African soccer player who plays as a midfielder for South African Premier Division side TS Galaxy. He was born in Masakona in Venda, now part of modern day. Limpopo.
