= Genino Palace =

South African soccer player

Personal information
- Full name: Genino Tyrell Palace
- Date of birth: 19 December 1998 (age 27)
- Place of birth: Johannesburg, South Africa
- Height: 1.83 m (6 ft 0 in)
- Position: Midfielder

Team information
- Current team: Stellenbosch
- Number: 28

Youth career
- Stars of Africa Academy
- 2017–2018: Sacavenense
- 2018–2020: Braga
- 2020–2022: Académica

Senior career*
Years	Team	Apps	(Gls)
2022–2023	Maritzburg United	37	(2)
2023–	Stellenbosch	52	(0)

International career^{‡}
2023–	South Africa	2	(0)
- * Club domestic league appearances and goals as of 4 January 2026 ‡ National team caps and goals as of 30 July 2023

Genino Tyrell Palace (born 19 December 1998) is a South African soccer player who plays as a midfielder for Stellenbosch in the Premier Soccer League.

== Career ==
He hails from Westbury, Johannesburg. Attending the Stars of Africa Academy, he was set on a transfer to Portugal. After a trial with Braga B ended up without a contract offer, Palace played one season for Sacavenense before joining S.C. Braga's academy. His inspirations were Steven Pienaar, who was from Westbury as well, and Luther Singh, who broke through in Portugal while Palace lived there.

Palace moved on to Académica Coimbra 's academy in 2020. In January 2022 his time in Portugal was over, as Palace moved back to South Africa and Maritzburg United.

Here he made his first-tier debut, breaking through in the 2022-23 South African Premier Division as a "deep-lying playmaker", but Maritzburg United was relegated. Clubs such as Stellenbosch were rumored to sign him.

Palace was also called up for South Africa for the 2023 COSAFA Cup, where he made his international debut. He played the third/fourth place playoff match against Malawi, which South Africa won.
