= Terrence Mashego =

South African soccer player (born 1996)

Personal information
- Date of birth: 28 June 1996 (age 30)
- Place of birth: Mamelodi, South Africa
- Height: 1.72 m (5 ft 8 in)
- Position: Defender

Team information
- Current team: Mamelodi Sundowns
- Number: 27

Youth career
- 2006–20??: Arcadia Shepherds
- 2016–2017: TUT

Senior career*
Years	Team	Apps	(Gls)
2017–2018	Mthatha Bucks		
2018–2020	TS Galaxy		
2020–2022	Cape Town City	59	(1)
2022–	Mamelodi Sundowns	23	(0)
2025–2026	→ Durban City (loan)	21	(0)
2026-	→ Stellenbosch (loan)	6	(0)

International career
2021–2024	South Africa	9	(0)
Medal record
Men's football
Representing South Africa
Africa Cup of Nations
Third place	2023 Ivory Coast
- * Club domestic league appearances and goals as of 20 September 2026

Terrence Mashego (born 28 June 1996) is a South African professional soccer player who plays as a defender for South African Premier Division club Stellenbosch on loan from Mamelodi Sundowns.

== Club career ==
Mashego was born in Mamelodi, Gauteng. He joined Arcadia Shepherds' youth set-up in 2006. Mashego attended Bona Lesedi Secondary School, completing his education in 2014. He attended Tshwane University of Technology through a sports scholarship from 2016, combining study with playing for their football team but left after 8 months and signed for National First Division club Mthatha Bucks. He made one appearance for Bucks in the 2016–17 season and 10 appearances in the 2017–18 season.

Mashego joined newly formed National First Division club TS Galaxy in 2018. He won the 2018–19 Nedbank Cup with Galaxy after the club beat Kaizer Chiefs in May 2019.

In October 2020, Mashego signed for South African Premier Division club Cape Town City.

He joined Mamelodi Sundowns in September 2022. It was reported that Mashego had signed a four-year deal with Sundowns.

In September 2025, Mashego joined newly promoted South African Premier Division club Durban City on a season-long loan, with the option to make the loan permanent.

In July 2026, he joined Stellenbosch on a loan.

== International career ==
Mashego received his first call-up to the South Africa national soccer team for World Cup qualification fixtures against Ethiopia in October 2021. He made his debut for South Africa in the 3–1 win over Ethiopia on 9 October.

He was part of the South Africa squad at the 2023 Africa Cup of Nations that finished 3rd.

== Honours ==
TS Galaxy

- Nedbank Cup: 2018–19

South Africa

- Africa Cup of Nations third place: 2023
