= Tonic Chabalala =

South African soccer player

Personal information
- Full name: Tonic Risimati Chabalala
- Date of birth: 25 April 1979 (age 47)
- Place of birth: Malamulele, South Africa
- Height: 1.78 m (5 ft 10 in)
- Position: Defender

Senior career*
Years	Team	Apps	(Gls)
–2004	Dynamos	110	(0)
2004–2008	Orlando Pirates	155	(0)
2008–2009	Thanda Royal Zulu		
2009–2010	Dynamos		
- * Club domestic league appearances and goals

Tonic Chabalala (born 25 April 1979) is a South African soccer player who was a defender for the Orlando Pirates in the Premier Soccer League.

He captained the Orlando Pirates side which reached the semi-finals of the 2006 CAF Champions League. In 2008 he left Orlando Pirates, but was picked up by Thanda Royal Zulu.

After retiring, he expressed "interest in coaching".

== Personal life ==
He hails from Xitlhelani, Malamulele and is Tsonga. He is the cousin of fellow footballer Justice Chabalala.

After retiring he ran companies in Malamulele.

In 2022 he was accused of bribery and false invoicing, with it being alleged that he bribed people to abet in sending invoices to the City of Johannesburg, leading to being overpaid 15 million rand. Chabalala denied knowledge of the case. He was released on a 4000 rand bail.

In the 2024 South African general election he stood as a candidate for the minor Action Alliance Development Party.
