= Matías Esquivel =

Argentine footballer

Personal information
- Full name: Matías Eduardo Esquivel
- Date of birth: 22 March 1999 (age 27)
- Place of birth: Avellaneda, Argentina
- Height: 1.64 m (5 ft 5 in)
- Position: Midfielder

Team information
- Current team: Mamelodi Sundowns

Youth career
- Lanús

Senior career*
Years	Team	Apps	(Gls)
2019–2023	Lanús	83	(5)
2022	→ Talleres (loan)	20	(3)
2024–	Mamelodi Sundowns	10	(1)
2024–2025	→ Talleres (loan)	11	(0)
2025–2026	→ A.E. Kifisia (loan)	4	(0)
- * Club domestic league appearances and goals as of 23 December 2025

Matías Eduardo Esquivel (born 22 March 1999) is an Argentine professional footballer who plays as an attacking midfielder for Mamelodi Sundowns.

== Career ==
Esquivel made his professional debut for Lanús in a 1–0 Argentine Primera División win over Racing Club on 8 December 2019.

In January 2024, Esquivel joined Mamelodi Sundowns for a reported fee of R46.7 million.

Esquivel joined Greek side AE Kifisia on loan in August 2025 for the 2025–26 season, however this was terminated in December 2025 after limited game time.
