= Jody February =

South African footballer (born 1996)

Personal information
- Full name: Jody Jason February
- Date of birth: 12 May 1996 (age 30)
- Place of birth: Cape Town, South Africa
- Height: 1.82 m (5 ft 11 1/2 in)
- Position: Goalkeeper

Senior career*
Years	Team	Apps	(Gls)
2014–2019	Ajax Cape Town	40	(0)
2019–	Mamelodi Sundowns	7	(0)
2019–2020	→ Cape Umoya United (loan)	15	(0)
2021–2022	→ Moroka Swallows (loan)	17	(0)
2023	→ AmaZulu (loan)	8	(0)
2026	→ Siwelele (loan)		

International career^{‡}
2015	South Africa U23	4	(0)
2016	South Africa	1	(0)
- * Club domestic league appearances and goals as of 11 March 2025 ‡ National team caps and goals as of 11 March 2025

Jody Jason February (born 12 May 1996) is a South African soccer player who plays as a goalkeeper for Mamelodi Sundowns. He was born in Cape Town.

== Club career ==
February started his career at Ajax Cape Town before signing for Mamelodi Sundowns in September 2019. He was loaned out to Cape Umoya United for the 2019–20 season.

During the 2022-23 season, he was loaned out to AmaZulu.

== International career ==
February played for the South Africa under-23 team at the 2015 Africa U-23 Cup of Nations.

He was a part of the South Africa national soccer team squad at the 2016 COSAFA Cup where he made one appearance, coming on at halftime in a 5–1 defeat of Eswatini.

He represented South Africa in the football competition at the 2016 Summer Olympics.
