= Zuko Mdunyelwa =

South African soccer player

Personal information
- Date of birth: 9 July 1999 (age 27)
- Place of birth: Strand, Cape Town
- Height: 1.74 m (5 ft 9 in)
- Position: Defender

Team information
- Current team: Mamelodi Sundowns
- Number: 28

Youth career
- YSD Macassar
- Ikapa United
- Cape Town City

Senior career*
| Years | Team | Apps | (Gls) |
| 2019–2021 | Cape Town City | 0 | (1) |
| 2020–2021 | → Cape Umoya United (loan) | 15 | (1) |
| 2021–2024 | Chippa United | 55 | (0) |
| 2024– | Mamelodi Sundowns | 17 | (0) |

International career^{‡}
- South Africa U-20
- South Africa U-23
| 2022 | South Africa | 3 | (0) |
- * Club domestic league appearances and goals as of 3 January 2026 ‡ National team caps and goals as of 28 March 2024

Zuko Mdunyelwa (born 9 July 1999) is a South African soccer player who plays as a defender for Mamelodi Sundowns in the Premier Soccer League and the South Africa national team.

Mdunyelwa came through the academy YSD Macassar. He was included in an Ikapa United team that played international tournaments. He was promoted to the first team of Cape Town City in August 2020, during the postponed 2019-20 South African Premier Division campaign. At the time, he was an under-20 international. He helped win the 2018 COSAFA U-20 Cup, but for the 2019 FIFA U-20 World Cup he was only included in the preliminary and not the final squad. He spent time on loan at Cape Umoya United in the National First Division. He then joined Chippa United and made his first-tier debut in the 2021-22 South African Premier Division.

Mdunyelwa was called up for South Africa for the 2022 COSAFA Cup, where he made his international debut against Mozambique. The match ended in a penalty shootout, where Mdunyelwa scored his penalty kick, but South Africa lost. During the consolation tournament, in the "plate semi final" against Madagascar, Mdunyelwa recorded an assist. Mdunyelwa also played the 2022 African Nations Championship qualification match against the Comoros.

In the winter of 2023, there were talks of a transfer to Stellenbosch and even the signing of a "pre-contract". He instead remained in Chippa United, until Mamelodi Sundowns signed him during the 2023–24 winter window. Rhulani Mokwena explained the need to have another right back in the squad alongside Khuliso Mudau, with a desire to play Thapelo Morena in another position.
