= Justice Chabalala =

South African soccer player

Personal information
- Date of birth: 16 November 1991 (age 34)
- Place of birth: Giyani, South Africa
- Height: 1.81 m (5 ft 11 in)
- Position: Defender

Team information
- Current team: Gomora United

Youth career
- –2015: Free State Stars

Senior career*
Years	Team	Apps	(Gls)
2015–2016	Free State Stars	18	(0)
2016–2022	Orlando Pirates	16	(1)
2017	→ Chippa United (loan)	14	(0)
2020	→ Bloemfontein Celtic (loan)	26	(0)
2021–2022	→ Sekhukhune United (loan)	8	(0)
2022–2025	Chippa United	57	(3)
2025–	Gomora United		
- * Club domestic league appearances and goals as of 01:52, 30 January 2026 (UTC)

Justice Chabalala (born 16 November 1991) is a South African soccer player who plays as a defender for Gomora United.

== Career ==
Having been promoted to their first team in October 2015, he made 18 league appearances for Free State Stars across the 2015–16 season.

He signed for Orlando Pirates in July 2016 on a three-year contract.

In January 2017, he joined Chippa United on loan until the end of the season. He appeared in fourteen league matches for the club.

He joined Bloemfontein Celtic on loan in January 2020. In September 2020, his loan was extended to the end of the 2020–21 season.

He joined Chippa United permanently in summer 2022. He agreed a new contract with the club in February 2024. He joined National First Division side Gomora United in summer 2025.

== Personal life ==
Chabalala was born in Giyani. He is the cousin of fellow footballer Tonic Chabalala.
