= Asekho Tiwani =

South African soccer player

Personal information
- Date of birth: 10 May 2005 (age 21)
- Position: Defender

Team information
- Current team: Mamelodi Sundowns
- Number: 31

Senior career*
Years	Team	Apps	(Gls)
2023–2024	Sekhukhune United	13	(2)
2024–	Mamelodi Sundowns	8	(0)

International career
2024–	South Africa U20		
- * Club domestic league appearances and goals as of 3 January 2026

Asekho Tiwani (born 10 May 2005) is a South African soccer player who plays as a defender for Premier Soccer League side Mamelodi Sundowns.

== Club career ==
He started his career at Limpopo side Sekhukhune United and made his debut in a 3-1 win over Richards Bay during the 2023-24 season. He later won the April goal of the month for the 2023-24 season.

On 25 July 2024 he joined Tshwane side, reigning league champions Mamelodi Sundowns.

== International career ==
Tiwani captained the South Africa under-20 side against two friendly matches against Lesotho U20 in August 2024.

== Honours ==
South Africa U-20

- U-20 Africa Cup of Nations: 2025
