= 2013 Toulon Tournament squads =

Below are the squads for the 2013 Toulon Tournament. Each team had to submit a maximum of 22 players.

Players in boldface have been capped at full international level at some point in their career.

== Group A ==
=== Colombia ===
Coach: (Colombia) Carlos Restrepo

No.	Pos.	Player	Date of birth (age)	Caps	Club
1	GK	Cristian Bonilla	2 June 1993 (aged 19)	5	(Colombia) Atlético Nacional
2	DF	Jherson Vergara	26 May 1994 (aged 19)	9	(Italy) Milan
3	DF	Deivy Balanta	9 February 1993 (aged 20)		(Colombia) Alianza Petrolera
4	DF	Andrés Correa	29 January 1994 (aged 19)		(Colombia) Independiente Medellín
5	DF	**Felipe Aguilar**	20 January 1993 (aged 20)		(Colombia) Alianza Petrolera
6	MF	José David Leudo	9 November 1993 (aged 19)		(Argentina) Estudiantes de la Plata
7	MF	Harrison Mojica	17 February 1993 (aged 20)		(Colombia) Deportivo Cali
8	MF	Cristian Higuita	12 January 1994 (aged 19)	1	(Colombia) Deportivo Cali
9	FW	**Jhon Córdoba**	11 May 1993 (aged 20)	4	(Mexico) Jaguares
10	MF	Brayan Angulo	19 July 1993 (aged 19)		(Colombia) Cortuluá
11	FW	Cristian Palomeque	2 April 1994 (aged 19)		(Colombia) Alianza Petrolera
12	GK	Luis Hurtado	24 January 1994 (aged 19)		(Colombia) Deportivo Cali
13	DF	**Helibelton Palacios**	11 June 1993 (aged 19)		(Colombia) Deportivo Cali
14	MF	**Sebastián Pérez**	29 March 1993 (aged 20)	8	(Colombia) Atlético Nacional
15	MF	**Guillermo Celis**	8 May 1993 (aged 20)		(Colombia) Junior de Barranquilla
16	MF	Luis Hernando Mena	20 May 1994 (aged 19)		(Colombia) Boyacá Chicó
17	MF	Ronald Herrera	20 May 1993 (aged 20)		(Colombia) Junior de Barranquilla
18	MF	Julián Figueroa	29 January 1993 (aged 20)		(Colombia) Envigado FC
19	FW	**Miguel Borja**	26 January 1993 (aged 20)		(Colombia) Cortuluá
20	DF	Yair Ibargüen	3 May 1993 (aged 20)		(Paraguay) Olimpia
21	GK	Jair Mosquera Romaña	5 February 1993 (aged 20)		(Colombia) Barranquilla FC
22	FW	**Andrés Rentería**	6 March 1993 (aged 20)		(Mexico) Santos Laguna

=== Congo DR ===
Coach: (France) Sébastien Migné

No.	Pos.	Player	Date of birth (age)	Caps	Club
1	GK	**Riffi Mandanda**	11 November 1992 (aged 20)		(France) Compiègne
2	DF	**Marcel Tisserand**	10 January 1993 (aged 20)		(France) Monaco
3	DF	Mike Cestor	30 April 1992 (aged 21)		(England) Leyton Orient
4	MF	Anthony Walongwa	15 October 1993 (aged 19)		(France) Nantes
5	DF	**Thierry Kasereka**	26 April 1994 (aged 19)		(Democratic Republic of the Congo) AS Vita Club
6	MF	**Lema Mabidi**	11 June 1993 (aged 19)		(Democratic Republic of the Congo) AS Vita Club
7	MF	**Bidje Manzia**	24 September 1994 (aged 18)		(Tunisia) Étoile du Sahel
8	FW	Patrick Nzuzi	24 October 1992 (aged 20)		(Republic of Ireland) Limerick
9	FW	Hermann Kabasele	5 February 1992 (aged 21)		(France) Evian
10	MF	Harrison Manzala	6 March 1994 (aged 19)		(France) Le Havre
11	FW	Olivier Lusamba	16 March 1993 (aged 20)		(Spain) Zamora
12	MF	Clarck N'Sikulu	10 July 1992 (aged 20)		(France) Evian
13	DF	**Héritier Luvumbu**	23 July 1994 (aged 18)		(Democratic Republic of the Congo) AS Vita Club
14	DF	**Ndombe Mubele**	17 April 1992 (aged 21)		(Democratic Republic of the Congo) AS Vita Club
15	FW	**Hervé Ndonga**	2 May 1992 (aged 21)		(Democratic Republic of the Congo) TP Mazembe
16	GK	Lorhim Diafuka	4 March 1993 (aged 20)		(France) Vannes
17	MF	**Merveille Bokadi**	21 May 1992 (aged 21)		(Democratic Republic of the Congo) TP Mazembe
18	MF	**Aristote Nsiala**	25 March 1992 (aged 21)		(England) Accrington Stanley
20	MF	**Jonathan Bijimine**	9 July 1994 (aged 18)		(France) Sedan
21	MF	**Omenuke Mfulu**	20 March 1994 (aged 19)		(France) Lille
22	FW	Grace Katshimuka	14 February 1994 (aged 19)		(France) Tours

=== France ===
Coach: (France) Willy Sagnol

No.	Pos.	Player	Date of birth (age)	Caps	Club
1	GK	Zacharie Boucher	7 March 1992 (aged 21)	0	(France) Le Havre
2	DF	**Djibril Sidibé**	29 July 1992 (aged 20)	0	(France) Lille
3	DF	**Layvin Kurzawa**	4 September 1992 (aged 20)	0	(France) Monaco
4	MF	**Rémi Mulumba**	2 November 1992 (aged 20)	0	(France) Dijon
5	DF	Loïck Landre	5 May 1992 (aged 21)	0	(France) Gazélec Ajaccio
6	DF	Alexandre Coeff	20 February 1992 (aged 21)	0	(France) Lens
7	FW	**Paul-Georges Ntep**	29 September 1992 (aged 20)	0	(France) Auxerre
8	MF	Jordan Ferri	12 March 1992 (aged 21)	0	(France) Lyon
9	FW	Benjamin Jeannot	22 January 1992 (aged 21)	1	(France) Châteauroux
10	MF	**Nampalys Mendy**	23 June 1992 (aged 20)	2	(France) Monaco
11	MF	**Neeskens Kebano**	10 March 1992 (aged 21)	0	(France) Caen
12	MF	**Giannelli Imbula**	12 September 1992 (aged 20)	0	(France) Guingamp
13	MF	Valentin Eysseric	25 March 1992 (aged 21)	0	(France) Nice
14	MF	**Rachid Ghezzal**	9 May 1992 (aged 21)	0	(France) Lyon
15	DF	Grégoire Puel	20 February 1992 (aged 21)	0	(France) Nice
16	GK	**Abdoulaye Diallo**	30 March 1992 (aged 21)	0	(France) Rennes
17	FW	**Kévin Mayi**	14 January 1993 (aged 20)	0	(France) Saint-Étienne
18	DF	Makan Traoré	26 May 1992 (aged 21)	0	(France) Laval
19	FW	**Stéphane Bahoken**	28 May 1992 (aged 21)	0	(France) Nice
20	DF	**Lindsay Rose**	8 February 1992 (aged 21)	0	(France) Valenciennes
21	DF	Gaël Vena Diambu	2 February 1993 (aged 20)	0	(France) Toulouse

=== South Korea ===
Coach: (South Korea) Lee Kwang-Jong

No.	Pos.	Player	Date of birth (age)	Caps	Club
1	GK	Kim Dong-joon	19 December 1994 (aged 18)		(South Korea) Yonsei University
2	DF	Sim Sang-min	21 May 1993 (aged 20)		(South Korea) Chung-Ang University
3	DF	Kim Yong-hwan	25 May 1993 (aged 20)		(South Korea) Soongsil University
4	DF	Yeon Jei-min (c)	28 May 1993 (aged 20)		(South Korea) Suwon Samsung
5	DF	Woo Joo-sung	8 June 1993 (aged 19)		(South Korea) Chung-Ang University
6	MF	Kim Sun-woo	19 April 1993 (aged 20)		(South Korea) University of Ulsan
7	FW	Ryu Seung-woo	17 December 1993 (aged 19)		(South Korea) Chung-Ang University
8	MF	**Lee Chang-min**	20 January 1994 (aged 19)		(South Korea) Chung-Ang University
9	FW	Kim Hyun	3 May 1993 (aged 20)		(South Korea) Seongnam Ilhwa
10	DF	**Lee Myung-jae**	4 November 1993 (aged 19)		(South Korea) Hongik University
11	MF	**Kang Sang-woo**	7 October 1993 (aged 19)		(South Korea) Kyung Hee University
12	MF	Kang Yoon-goo	8 February 1993 (aged 20)		(Japan) Vissel Kobe
13	DF	Park Yong-joon	21 June 1993 (aged 19)		(South Korea) Suwon Samsung
14	DF	**Song Ju-hun**	13 January 1994 (aged 19)		(South Korea) Konkuk University
15	MF	Jung Hyun-cheol	26 April 1993 (aged 20)		(South Korea) Dongguk University
16	DF	**Jang Hyun-soo**	1 January 1993 (aged 20)		(South Korea) Yong In University
17	FW	Kim Seung-joon	11 September 1994 (aged 18)		(South Korea) Soongsil University
19	FW	Cho Suk-jae	24 March 1993 (aged 20)		(South Korea) Konkuk University
20	MF	Han Sung-gyu	27 January 1993 (aged 20)		(South Korea) Gwangoon University
21	GK	Ham Seok-min	14 February 1994 (aged 19)		(South Korea) Soongsil University
22	MF	**Heo Yong-joon**	8 January 1993 (aged 20)		(South Korea) Korea University

=== United States ===
Coach: (United States) Tab Ramos

No.	Pos.	Player	Date of birth (age)	Caps	Club
1	GK	Cody Cropper	16 February 1993 (aged 20)		(England) Southampton
2	DF	Eric Miller	15 January 1993 (aged 20)		(United States) Creighton
3	DF	Juan Pablo Ocegueda	13 July 1993 (aged 19)		(Mexico) Guadalajara
4	DF	**Caleb Stanko**	26 July 1993 (aged 19)		(Germany) SC Freiburg
5	MF	Mikey Lopez	20 February 1993 (aged 20)		(United States) Sporting Kansas City
6	MF	**Wil Trapp**	15 January 1993 (aged 20)		(United States) Columbus Crew
7	FW	Victor Pineda	15 March 1993 (aged 20)		(United States) Chicago Fire
8	MF	Benji Joya	22 September 1993 (aged 19)		(Mexico) Santos Laguna
9	FW	Alonso Hernández	1 March 1994 (aged 19)		(Mexico) Monterrey
10	MF	Collin Martin	9 November 1994 (aged 18)		(United States) Wake Forest
11	FW	Daniel Cuevas	29 July 1993 (aged 19)		(Mexico) Santos Laguna
12	GK	Kendall McIntosh	24 January 1994 (aged 19)		(United States) Santa Clara
13	MF	Dillon Serna	25 March 1994 (aged 19)		(United States) Colorado Rapids
14	DF	Oscar Sorto	8 August 1994 (aged 18)		(United States) LA Galaxy
15	MF	**Kellyn Acosta**	24 July 1995 (aged 17)		(United States) FC Dallas
16	FW	**Jordan Morris**	26 October 1994 (aged 18)		(United States) Seattle Sounders
17	DF	Shane O'Neill	2 September 1993 (aged 19)		(United States) Colorado Rapids
18	DF	**Jefrey Payeras**	16 October 1993 (aged 19)		(Guatemala) Municipal
19	FW	Alfred Koroma	19 April 1994 (aged 19)		(United States) Akron
20	FW	Danny Garcia	14 October 1993 (aged 19)		(United States) North Carolina
21	DF	Javan Torre	20 October 1993 (aged 19)		(United States) UCLA
22	MF	Marlon Hairston	23 March 1994 (aged 19)		(United States) Louisville

== Group B ==
=== Belgium ===
Coach: (Belgium) Johan Walem

No.	Pos.	Player	Date of birth (age)	Caps	Goals	Club
1	GK	**Koen Casteels**	25 June 1992 (aged 20)	7	0	(German Football Association) 1899 Hoffenheim
2	DF	Pierre-Yves Ngawa	9 February 1992 (aged 21)	0	0	(Royal Belgian Football Association) Sint-Truiden
3	DF	Michaël Heylen	3 January 1994 (aged 19)	2	0	(Royal Belgian Football Association) Anderlecht
5	DF	Bruno Godeau	10 May 1992 (aged 21)	1	0	(Royal Belgian Football Association) Zulte-Waregem
6	DF	Bernard Malanda-Adje	28 August 1994 (aged 18)	2	0	(Royal Belgian Football Association) Zulte-Waregem
7	MF	**Yannick Carrasco**	4 September 1993 (aged 19)	1	0	(French Football Federation) Monaco
8	DF	**Brandon Mechele**	28 January 1993 (aged 20)	0	0	(Royal Belgian Football Association) Club Brugge
9	FW	**Igor Vetokele**	23 March 1992 (aged 21)	4	2	(Danish Football Association) Copenhagen
10	MF	**Dennis Praet**	14 May 1994 (aged 19)	3	0	(Royal Belgian Football Association) Anderlecht
11	MF	Massimo Bruno	17 September 1993 (aged 19)	2	0	(Royal Belgian Football Association) Anderlecht
12	GK	**Matz Sels**	26 February 1992 (aged 21)	2	0	(Royal Belgian Football Association) Lierse
13	DF	**Jordan Lukaku**	25 July 1994 (aged 18)	1	0	(Royal Belgian Football Association) Anderlecht
14	DF	Dino Arslanagić	24 April 1993 (aged 20)	3	0	(Royal Belgian Football Association) Standard Liège
15	DF	Brice Ntambwe	29 April 1993 (aged 20)	0	0	(Royal Belgian Football Association) Mons
16	DF	Marnick Vermijl	13 January 1992 (aged 21)	0	0	(The Football Association) Manchester United
17	MF	**Paul-José M'Poku**	19 April 1992 (aged 21)	7	1	(Royal Belgian Football Association) Standard Liège
18	DF	Bryan Verboom	30 January 1992 (aged 21)	2	0	(Royal Belgian Football Association) Zulte-Waregem
19	FW	Dylan De Belder	3 April 1992 (aged 21)	1	0	(Royal Belgian Football Association) Mons
20	MF	Lamisha Musonda	27 March 1992 (aged 21)	5	0	(The Football Association) Chelsea
21	GK	Théo Defourny	25 April 1992 (aged 21)	0	0	(French Football Federation) Rouen
22	FW	**Zakaria Bakkali**	26 January 1996 (aged 17)	0	0	(Royal Dutch Football Association) PSV

=== Brazil ===
Coach: (Brazil) Alexandre Gallo

No.	Pos.	Player	Date of birth (age)	Caps	Goals	Club
1	GK	**Alisson Becker**	2 October 1992 (aged 20)	0	0	(Brazilian Football Confederation) Internacional
2	DF	Lucas Farias	18 August 1994 (aged 18)	0	0	(Brazilian Football Confederation) São Paulo
3	DF	Wallace	14 October 1994 (aged 18)	0	0	(Brazilian Football Confederation) Cruzeiro
4	DF	**Dória**	8 November 1994 (aged 18)	0	0	(Brazilian Football Confederation) Botafogo
5	MF	Matheus Biteco	28 June 1995 (aged 17)	0	0	(Brazilian Football Confederation) Grêmio
6	DF	**Douglas Santos**	22 March 1994 (aged 19)	0	0	(Brazilian Football Confederation) Náutico
7	MF	Giovanni	24 April 1994 (aged 19)	0	0	(Brazilian Football Confederation) Corinthians
8	MF	João Schmidt	19 May 1993 (aged 20)	0	0	(Brazilian Football Confederation) São Paulo
9	FW	Vinícius Araújo	22 February 1993 (aged 20)	0	0	(Brazilian Football Confederation) Cruzeiro
10	FW	Ademilson	9 January 1994 (aged 19)	0	0	(Brazilian Football Confederation) São Paulo
11	MF	**Rafinha**	12 February 1993 (aged 20)	0	0	(Royal Spanish Football Federation) Barcelona B
12	GK	Gabriel Gasparotto	9 December 1993 (aged 19)	0	0	(Brazilian Football Confederation) Santos
13	DF	Tinga	1 September 1993 (aged 19)	0	0	(Brazilian Football Confederation) Grêmio
14	DF	Lucão	23 March 1996 (aged 17)	0	0	(Brazilian Football Confederation) São Paulo
15	DF	Jubal	29 August 1993 (aged 19)	0	0	(Brazilian Football Confederation) Santos
16	DF	Abner	30 May 1996 (aged 17)	0	0	(Brazilian Football Confederation) Coritiba
17	MF	Danilo	28 January 1996 (aged 17)	0	0	(Brazilian Football Confederation) Vasco da Gama
18	FW	Erik Lima	18 July 1994 (aged 18)	0	0	(Brazilian Football Confederation) Goiás
19	FW	**Luan**	14 January 1996 (aged 17)	0	0	(Brazilian Football Confederation) Portuguesa
20	FW	Yuri Mamute	7 May 1995 (aged 18)	0	0	(Brazilian Football Confederation) Grêmio
21	MF	Talisca	1 February 1994 (aged 19)	0	0	(Brazilian Football Confederation) Bahia

=== Mexico ===
Coach: (Mexico) Sergio Almaguer

No.	Pos.	Player	Date of birth (age)	Caps	Goals	Club
1	GK	Richard Sánchez	5 May 1994 (aged 19)	5	0	(United States Soccer Federation) FC Dallas
2	DF	Francisco Flores	17 January 1994 (aged 19)	5	1	(Mexican Football Federation) Cruz Azul
3	DF	**Hedgardo Marín**	21 February 1993 (aged 20)	5	0	(Mexican Football Federation) Guadalajara
4	DF	Antonio Briseño	5 February 1994 (aged 19)	5	2	(Mexican Football Federation) Atlas
5	DF	Bernardo Hernández	10 June 1993 (aged 19)	5	0	(Mexican Football Federation) Monterrey
6	MF	Armando Zamorano	3 October 1993 (aged 19)	4	1	(Mexican Football Federation) Chiapas
7	MF	Jonathan Espericueta	9 August 1994 (aged 18)	3	1	(Mexican Football Federation) Tigres UANL
8	MF	**Raúl López**	23 February 1993 (aged 20)	1	0	(Mexican Football Federation) Guadalajara
9	FW	**Marco Bueno**	31 March 1994 (aged 19)	5	2	(Mexican Football Federation) Pachuca
10	MF	**Jesús Corona**	6 January 1993 (aged 20)	4	3	(Mexican Football Federation) Monterrey
11	MF	**Arturo González**	5 September 1994 (aged 18)	1	0	(Mexican Football Federation) Atlas
12	GK	**Gibran Lajud**	25 December 1993 (aged 19)	0	0	(Mexican Football Federation) Cruz Azul
13	DF	**José Abella**	10 February 1994 (aged 19)	1	0	(Mexican Football Federation) Santos Laguna
14	DF	Abel Fuentes	16 November 1993 (aged 19)	1	0	(Mexican Football Federation) Guadalajara
15	DF	**Josecarlos Van Rankin**	14 May 1993 (aged 20)	5	0	(Mexican Football Federation) UNAM
16	MF	Carlos Treviño	19 April 1993 (aged 20)	1	0	(Mexican Football Federation) Atlas
17	FW	Julio Morales	19 December 1993 (aged 19)	3	1	(United States Soccer Federation) Chivas USA
18	MF	Uvaldo Luna	21 December 1993 (aged 19)	3	0	(Mexican Football Federation) Tigres UANL
19	FW	Luis Madrigal	10 February 1993 (aged 20)	3	0	(Mexican Football Federation) Monterrey
20	FW	**Alonso Escoboza**	22 January 1993 (aged 20)	5	2	(Mexican Football Federation) Necaxa
21	GK	Alberto Gurrola	9 April 1993 (aged 20)	0	0	(Mexican Football Federation) Atlas
22	MF	**Cándido Ramírez**	5 June 1993 (aged 19)	2	1	(Mexican Football Federation) Santos Laguna

=== Nigeria ===
Coach: (Nigeria) John Obuh

No.	Pos.	Player	Date of birth (age)	Caps	Goals	Club
1	GK	John Felagha	July 27, 1994 (aged 18)	0	0	(Royal Belgian Football Association) Eupen
2	MF	Edafe Egbedi	August 5, 1993 (aged 19)	10	3	(Danish Football Association) AGF Aarhus
3	DF	**Jamilu Collins**	August 5, 1994 (aged 18)	0	0	(Croatian Football Federation) HNK Rijeka
4	MF	Moses Orkuma	June 19, 1993 (aged 19)	12	1	(Nigeria Football Federation) Lobi Stars
5	MF	**Semi Ajayi**	November 9, 1993 (aged 19)	0	0	(The Football Association) Charlton Athletic
7	FW	Bright Ejike	January 1, 1993 (aged 20)	16	1	(Nigeria Football Federation) Sharks
8	MF	**Samuel Mathias**	December 23, 1996 (aged 16)	0	0	(Nigeria Football Federation) Kano Pillars
9	FW	**Alhaji Gero**	October 10, 1993 (aged 19)	12	4	(Nigeria Football Federation) Enugu Rangers
10	MF	**Abdullahi Shehu**	March 12, 1993 (aged 20)	14	0	(Nigeria Football Federation) Kano Pillars
11	FW	**Olarenwaju Kayode**	May 8, 1993 (aged 20)	14	4	(Nigeria Football Federation) Ansfeed FC
12	FW	**Emem Eduok**	January 31, 1994 (aged 19)	0	0	(Nigeria Football Federation) Dolphins
13	MF	**Uche**	December 4, 1995 (aged 17)	0	0	(Nigeria Football Federation) Enyimba
14	DF	Ikechukwu Okorie	November 19, 1993 (aged 19)	17	0	(Nigeria Football Federation) Enyimba
15	DF	Abubakar Hassan	March 12, 1994 (aged 19)	6	0	(Nigeria Football Federation) JUTH
16	GK	Samuel Okani	February 11, 1994 (aged 19)	10	0	(Nigeria Football Federation) Enyimba
17	FW	**Christian Pyagbara**	March 13, 1996 (aged 17)	5	2	(Nigeria Football Federation) Sharks
18	FW	**Etor Daniel**	May 5, 1993 (aged 20)	0	0	(Nigeria Football Federation) Akwa United F.C.
19	DF	**Kingsley Madu**	December 12, 1995 (aged 17)	4	0	(Nigeria Football Federation) El-Kanemi Warriors
20	FW	**Moses Simon**	July 12, 1995 (aged 17)	0	0	unattached
21	MF	Michael Olaitan	January 1, 1993 (aged 20)	0	0	(Hellenic Football Federation) Olympiacos
22	DF	**Wilfred Ndidi**	December 16, 1996 (aged 16)	0	0	(Nigeria Football Federation) NATH Boys
23	GK	Sebastian Osigwe	March 26, 1994 (aged 19)	0	0	(Swiss Football Association) Emmenbrücke

=== Portugal ===
Coach: (Portugal) Edgar Borges

No.	Pos.	Player	Date of birth (age)	Caps	Club
1	GK	André Preto	18 April 1993 (aged 20)		(Portugal) Vitória de Guimarães
2	DF	Frederico Venâncio	4 February 1993 (aged 20)		(Portugal) Vitória de Setúbal
3	DF	Tiago Ferreira	10 July 1993 (aged 19)		(Portugal) Porto
4	DF	Tiago Ilori	26 February 1993 (aged 20)		(Portugal) Sporting CP
5	DF	**Mica Pinto**	4 June 1993 (aged 19)		(Portugal) Sporting CP
6	MF	Agostinho Cá	24 July 1993 (aged 19)		(Spain) Barcelona B
7	FW	**Piqueti**	12 February 1993 (aged 20)		(Portugal) Braga
8	MF	**João Mário**	19 January 1993 (aged 20)		(Portugal) Sporting CP
9	FW	Betinho	21 July 1993 (aged 19)		(Portugal) Sporting CP
10	MF	Ricardo Esgaio	16 May 1993 (aged 20)		(Portugal) Sporting CP
11	MF	**Ivan Cavaleiro**	18 October 1993 (aged 19)		(Portugal) Benfica
12	GK	**José Sá**	17 January 1993 (aged 20)		(Portugal) Marítimo
13	FW	Aladje	22 October 1993 (aged 19)		(Italy) Aprilia
14	DF	**Edgar Ié**	1 May 1994 (aged 19)		(Spain) Barcelona B
15	MF	**André Gomes**	30 July 1993 (aged 19)		(Portugal) Benfica
16	MF	Ricardo Alves	25 March 1993 (aged 20)		(Portugal) Belenenses
17	MF	Tozé	14 January 1993 (aged 20)		(Portugal) Porto
18	MF	Tiago Silva	2 June 1993 (aged 19)		(Portugal) Belenenses
19	MF	**Ricardo Pereira**	6 October 1993 (aged 19)		(Portugal) Vitória de Guimarães
20	DF	Kiko	20 January 1993 (aged 20)		(Portugal) Vitória de Setúbal
21	DF	**Tomás Dabó**	20 October 1993 (aged 19)		(Portugal) Braga
22	GK	Rafael Veloso	3 November 1993 (aged 19)		(Portugal) Belenenses
