= 2013 FIFA U-20 World Cup =

2013 FIFA U-20 Dünya Kupası

Tournament details
- Host country: Turkey
- Dates: 21 June – 13 July
- Teams: 24 (from 6 confederations)
- Venues: 7 (in 7 host cities)

Final positions
- Champions: France (1st title)
- Runners-up: Uruguay
- Third place: Ghana
- Fourth place: Iraq

Tournament statistics
- Matches played: 52
- Goals scored: 152 (2.92 per match)
- Attendance: 303,251 (5,832 per match)
- Top scorer(s): (Ghana) Ebenezer Assifuah (6 goals)
- Best player: (France) Paul Pogba
- Best goalkeeper: (Uruguay) Guillermo de Amores
- Fair play award: Spain

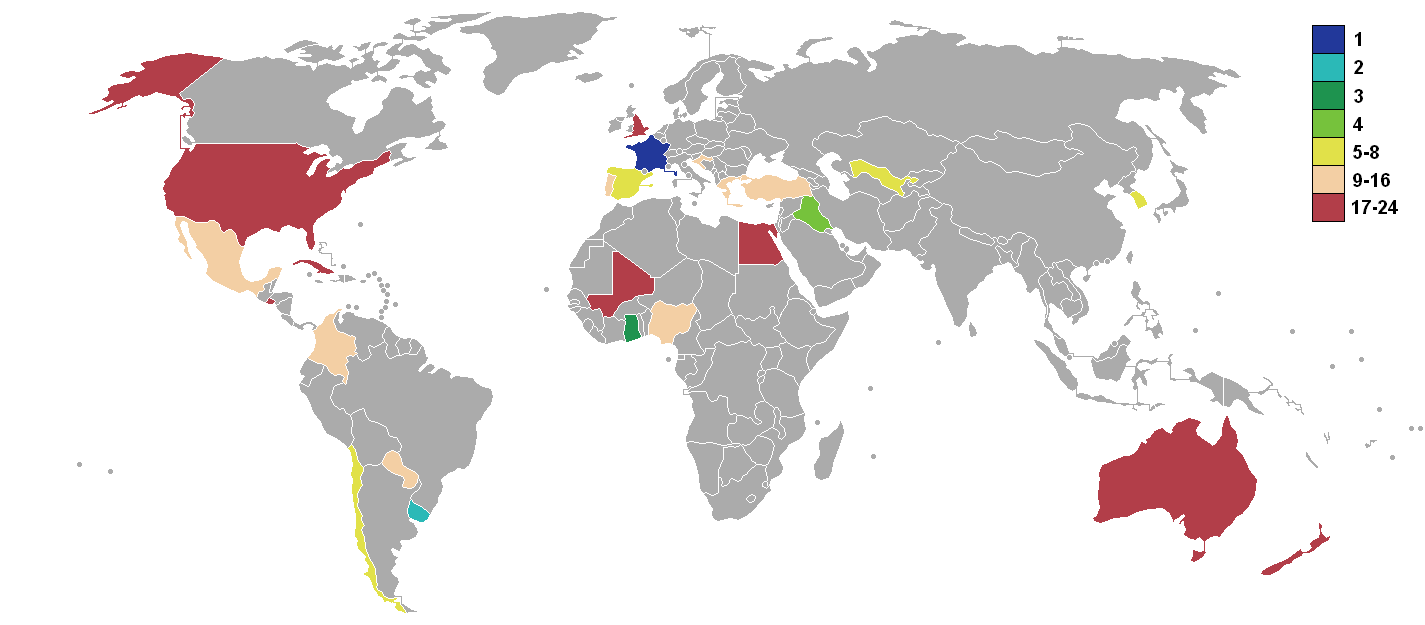
Map of results

The 2013 FIFA U-20 World Cup was the nineteenth edition of the FIFA U-20 World Cup, since its inception in 1977 as the FIFA World Youth Championship. It ran from 21 June to 13 July 2013. At the FIFA Executive Meeting in Zürich on 3 March 2011, Turkey beat other bids to host the series games, from host competition by the United Arab Emirates and Uzbekistan. In its bid, Turkey suggested the use of thirteen stadiums in ten of its cities, before deciding in February 2012, that seven cities would play host to games.

This tournament marked the first time in its history that neither Argentina nor Brazil (the most successful teams in the competition) qualified. It was also only the second time that Brazil had not taken part (the first time was the 1979 edition). As defending champions, Brazil were the third consecutive incumbent title holder to fail to qualify for the subsequent tournament.

France won the tournament and their first U-20 World Cup, and thus became the first nation to win all five FIFA 11-a-side men's titles (FIFA World Cup, FIFA Confederations Cup, FIFA U-20 World Cup, FIFA U-17 World Cup, and the Olympic football tournament).

== Bids ==
At the deadline date of 17 January 2011, three member associations confirmed they would be bidding for the event. Neither Turkey nor Uzbekistan had ever been hosts to a FIFA competition, while the United Arab Emirates were hosts of the U-20s in 2003.

- Turkey
- United Arab Emirates
- Uzbekistan
- Zimbabwe (withdrew bid)

== Venues ==
Istanbul	Kayseri	Bursa
Ali Sami Yen Spor Kompleksi	Kadir Has Stadium	Atatürk Stadium
41°6′10″N 28°59′26″E	38°44′13″N 35°25′24″E	40°11′34″N 29°2′56″E
Capacity: 52,652	Capacity: 32,864	Capacity: 25,213
Trabzon	2013 FIFA U-20 World Cup (Turkey)	
Hüseyin Avni Aker Stadium	2013 FIFA U-20 World Cup (Turkey)	
41°0′17″N 39°42′19″E	2013 FIFA U-20 World Cup (Turkey)	
Capacity: 23,772	2013 FIFA U-20 World Cup (Turkey)	
Gaziantep	Rize	Antalya
Kamil Ocak Stadium	Yeni Şehir Stadium	Akdeniz University Stadium
37°4′3″N 37°22′39″E	41°1′23″N 40°31′58″E	36°53′38″N 30°38′48″E
Capacity: 16,981	Capacity: 15,485	Capacity: 7,083

== Qualification ==
In addition to host nation Turkey, 23 nations qualified from six separate continental competitions.

Confederation	Qualifying Tournament	Qualifier(s)
AFC (Asia)	2012 AFC U-19 Championship	Australia; Iraq; South Korea; Uzbekistan
CAF (Africa)	2013 African U-20 Championship	Egypt; Ghana; Mali; Nigeria
CONCACAF (North, Central America & Caribbean)	2013 CONCACAF U-20 Championship	Cuba^{1} El Salvador^{1} Mexico; United States
CONMEBOL (South America)	2013 South American Youth Championship	Chile; Colombia; Paraguay; Uruguay
OFC (Oceania)	2013 OFC U-20 Championship	New Zealand
UEFA (Europe)	Host nation	Turkey
UEFA (Europe)	2012 UEFA European Under-19 Football Championship	Croatia; England; France; Greece^{1} Portugal; Spain

1. Teams that made their debut.

== Organization and emblem ==
To mark the one year countdown date to the competition, FIFA, as well as members of the Turkish FA, announced that the emblem would be presented to the media on 25 June 2012 at Ciragan Palace Mabeyn Hall in Istanbul. Details of the ticketing access were made publicly available on 30 November 2012.

Host city logos for each participating stadium were shown to the general public on 20 March 2013, with each taking inspiration from their surroundings. The official logo included an Evil Eye protector, worn or hung inside Turkish homes to bring luck.

== Mascot ==
The mascot for the tournament was called Kanki, a blue-eyed Kangal puppy.

== Theme song ==
The official theme song for the tournament was Yıldızlar Buradan Yükseliyor, which is translated as Building Bridges for Rising Stars, performed by Turkish rock band Gece.

== Draw ==
The final draw was held at the Grand Tarabya Hotel in Istanbul on 25 March 2013, at 19:00 local time.

On 12 February 2013, FIFA announced the procedure of the draw. The 24 teams were divided into four differing pots:

- Pot 1: The continental champions of six confederations
- Pot 2: Remaining teams from AFC and CAF
- Pot 3: Remaining teams from CONCACAF and CONMEBOL
- Pot 4: Host and remaining teams from UEFA

Turkey was assigned to position C1, and Spain was assigned to Group A. As a basic principle, teams from the same confederation could not be drawn against each other at the group stage, except in Group A where there were two teams from UEFA.

As the CAF U-20 Championship was not completed at the time of the draw, a separate draw took place at the tournament's conclusion on 30 March in Oran, Algeria to determine the groups where the second, third and fourth-placed CAF teams would play in. As the OFC U-20 Championship was realize after at time of the draw, New Zealand appeared in Pot 1 as OFC Champion.

Pot 1	Pot 2	Pot 3	Pot 4
South Korea; Egypt; Mexico; Colombia; New Zealand; Spain (assigned to Group A)	Australia; Iraq; Uzbekistan; Ghana; Mali; Nigeria	Cuba; El Salvador; United States; Chile; Paraguay; Uruguay	Croatia; England; France; Greece; Portugal; Turkey (assigned to C1)

== Match officials ==
The 23 referee trios were announced by FIFA on 13 May 2013.

Confederation	Referee	Assistants
AFC	Ben Williams (Australia)	Matthew Cream (Australia); Hakan Anaz (Australia)
AFC	Nawaf Shukralla (Bahrain)	Yaser Tulefat (Bahrain); Ebrahim Saleh (Bahrain)
AFC	Alireza Faghani (Iran)	Hassan Kamranifar (Iran); Reza Sokhandan (Iran)
CAF	Néant Alioum (Cameroon)	Evarist Menkouande (Cameroon); Peter Edibe (Nigeria)
CAF	Bakary Gassama (Gambia)	Angesom Ogbamariam (Eritrea); Félicien Kabanda (Rwanda)
CAF	Noumandiez Doué (Ivory Coast)	Songuifolo Yeo (Ivory Coast); Jean-Claude Birumushahu (Burundi)
CONCACAF	Walter López (Guatemala)	Gerson López (Guatemala); Leonel Leal (Costa Rica)
CONCACAF	Roberto García (Mexico)	José Luis Camargo (Mexico); Alberto Morín (Mexico)
CONCACAF	Roberto Moreno (Panama)	Daniel Williamson (Panama); Keyztel Corrales (Nicaragua)
CONMEBOL	Sandro Ricci (Brazil)	Alessandro Rocha (Brazil); Emerson de Carvalho (Brazil)
CONMEBOL	Wilmar Roldán (Colombia)	Humberto Clavijo (Colombia); Eduardo Díaz (Colombia)
CONMEBOL	Carlos Vera (Ecuador)	Christian Lescano (Ecuador); Byron Romero (Ecuador)
CONMEBOL	Antonio Arias (Paraguay)	Rodney Aquino (Paraguay); Carlos Cáceres (Paraguay)
CONMEBOL	Víctor Hugo Carrillo (Peru)	Jonny Bossio (Peru); César Escano (Peru)
OFC	Peter O'Leary (New Zealand)	Jan-Hendrik Hintz (New Zealand); Ravinesh Kumar (Fiji)
UEFA	Stéphane Lannoy (France)	Frédéric Cano (France); Michaël Annonier (France)
UEFA	Viktor Kassai (Hungary)	Gábor Erős (Hungary); István Albert (Hungary)
UEFA	Nicola Rizzoli (Italy)	Renato Faverani (Italy); Andrea Stefani (Italy)
UEFA	Milorad Mažić (Serbia)	Milovan Ristić (Serbia); Dalibor Djurdjević (Serbia)
UEFA	Damir Skomina (Slovenia)	Matej Žunič (Slovenia); Bojan Ul (Slovenia)
UEFA	Alberto Undiano Mallenco (Spain)	Raúl Cabanero Martínez (Spain); Roberto Díaz Pérez (Spain)
UEFA	Jonas Eriksson (Sweden)	Mathias Klasenius (Sweden); Daniel Wärnmark (Sweden)
UEFA	Cüneyt Çakır (Turkey)	Bahattin Duran (Turkey); Tarık Ongun (Turkey)

== Squads ==
Teams had to name a 21-man squad (three of whom had to be goalkeepers) by the FIFA deadline. The squads were announced by FIFA on 14 June 2013.

== Group stage ==
The winners and runners-up from each group, as well as the best four third-placed teams, qualified for the first round of the knockout stage (round of 16).

The ranking of each team in each group was determined as follows:

1. points obtained in all group matches;
2. goal difference in all group matches;
3. number of goals scored in all group matches;

If two or more teams were equal on the basis of the above three criteria, their rankings were determined as follows:

1. points obtained in the group matches between the teams concerned;
2. goal difference in the group matches between the teams concerned;
3. number of goals scored in the group matches between the teams concerned;
4. drawing of lots by the FIFA Organising Committee.

All times are local, UTC+03:00.

=== Group A ===
Pos	Team	Pld	W	D	L	GF	GA	GD	Pts	Group stage result
1	Spain	3	3	0	0	7	2	+5	9	Advance to knockout stage
2	France	3	1	1	1	5	4	+1	4	Advance to knockout stage
3	Ghana	3	1	0	2	5	5	0	3	Advance to knockout stage
4	United States	3	0	1	2	3	9	−6	1	

21 June 2013
18:00

France	3–1	Ghana
Kondogbia 65'; Sanogo 68'; Bahebeck 79'	Report	Boakye 85'

Ali Sami Yen Spor Kompleksi, Istanbul
Attendance: 4,133
Referee: Wilmar Roldán (Colombia)

21 June 2013
21:00

United States	1–4	Spain
Gil 77'	Report	Jesé 5', 44'; Deulofeu 42', 61'

Ali Sami Yen Spor Kompleksi, Istanbul
Attendance: 4,133
Referee: Bakary Gassama (Gambia)

24 June 2013
18:00

France	1–1	United States
Sanogo 48' (pen.)	Report	Cuevas 85'

Ali Sami Yen Spor Kompleksi, Istanbul
Attendance: 4,120
Referee: Carlos Vera (Ecuador)

24 June 2013
21:00

Spain	1–0	Ghana
Jesé 13'	Report

Ali Sami Yen Spor Kompleksi, Istanbul
Attendance: 4,120
Referee: Ben Williams (Australia)

27 June 2013
20:00

Spain	2–1	France
Alcácer 23'; Jesé 56'	Report	Vion 90+1'

Ali Sami Yen Spor Kompleksi, Istanbul
Attendance: 7,511
Referee: Jonas Eriksson (Sweden)

27 June 2013
20:00

Ghana	4–1	United States
Acheampong 38'; Assifuah 58', 78'; Ashia 83'	Report	O'Neill 69'

Kadir Has Stadium, Kayseri
Attendance: 4,873
Referee: Nawaf Shukralla (Bahrain)

=== Group B ===
Pos	Team	Pld	W	D	L	GF	GA	GD	Pts	Group stage result
1	Portugal	3	2	1	0	10	4	+6	7	Advance to knockout stage
2	Nigeria	3	2	0	1	6	3	+3	6	Advance to knockout stage
3	South Korea	3	1	1	1	4	4	0	4	Advance to knockout stage
4	Cuba	3	0	0	3	1	10	−9	0	

21 June 2013
18:00

Cuba	1–2	South Korea
Reyes 7'	Report	Kwon Chang-hoon 51' (pen.); Ryu Seung-woo 83'

Kadir Has Stadium, Kayseri
Attendance: 10,428
Referee: Cüneyt Çakır (Turkey)

21 June 2013
21:00

Nigeria	2–3	Portugal
Ajagun 57', 67'	Report	Bruma 30', 69'; Aladje 34'

Kadir Has Stadium, Kayseri
Attendance: 10,428
Referee: Víctor Hugo Carrillo (Peru)

24 June 2013
18:00

Cuba	0–3	Nigeria
	Report	Umar 19', 23'; Ajagun 67'

Kadir Has Stadium, Kayseri
Attendance: 1,058
Referee: Viktor Kassai (Hungary)

24 June 2013
21:00

Portugal	2–2	South Korea
Aladje 3'; Bruma 60'	Report	Ryu Seung-woo 45'; Kim Hyun 76'

Kadir Has Stadium, Kayseri
Attendance: 1,058
Referee: Walter López (Guatemala)

27 June 2013
17:00

South Korea	0–1	Nigeria
	Report	Kayode 9'

Türk Telekom Arena, Istanbul
Attendance: 7,511
Referee: Peter O'Leary (New Zealand)

27 June 2013
17:00

Portugal	5–0	Cuba
Ricardo 15'; Aladje 37'; Bruma 43', 62'; Tozé 69'	Report

Kadir Has Stadium, Kayseri
Attendance: 4,873
Referee: Wilmar Roldán (Colombia)

=== Group C ===
Pos	Team	Pld	W	D	L	GF	GA	GD	Pts	Group stage result
1	Colombia	3	2	1	0	5	1	+4	7	Advance to knockout stage
2	Turkey (H)	3	2	0	1	5	2	+3	6	Advance to knockout stage
3	El Salvador	3	1	0	2	2	7	−5	3	
4	Australia	3	0	1	2	3	5	−2	1	

(H) Hosts
22 June 2013
18:00

Colombia	1–1	Australia
Córdoba 78'	Report	De Silva 46'

Hüseyin Avni Aker Stadium, Trabzon
Attendance: 4,662
Referee: Milorad Mažić (Serbia)

22 June 2013
21:00

Turkey	3–0	El Salvador
Uçan 9'; Şahin 46', 64'	Report

Hüseyin Avni Aker Stadium, Trabzon
Attendance: 4,662
Referee: Sandro Ricci (Brazil)

25 June 2013
18:00

Australia	1–2	El Salvador
Brillante 9'	Report	Coca 17'; Peña 40'

Yeni Şehir Stadium, Rize
Attendance: 13,015
Referee: Stéphane Lannoy (France)

25 June 2013
21:00

Turkey	0–1	Colombia
	Report	Quintero 52'

Yeni Şehir Stadium, Rize
Attendance: 13,015
Referee: Noumandiez Doué (Ivory Coast)

28 June 2013
21:00

Australia	1–2	Turkey
Maclaren 52'	Report	Çalhanoğlu 54'; Yokuşlu 87'

Hüseyin Avni Aker Stadium, Trabzon
Attendance: 11,286
Referee: Roberto García (Mexico)

28 June 2013
21:00

El Salvador	0–3	Colombia
	Report	Rentería 21'; Córdoba 25' (pen.); Quintero 90+1'

Kamil Ocak Stadium, Gaziantep
Attendance: 2,000
Referee: Néant Alioum (Cameroon)

=== Group D ===
Pos	Team	Pld	W	D	L	GF	GA	GD	Pts	Group stage result
1	Greece	3	1	2	0	3	2	+1	5 (Note: Drawing of lots was used to determine the final positions of Greece and Paraguay, as the two teams finished level on points, goal difference, goals scored, and head-to-head record.)	Advance to knockout stage
2	Paraguay	3	1	2	0	3	2	+1	5	Advance to knockout stage
3	Mexico	3	1	0	2	5	4	+1	3	Advance to knockout stage
4	Mali	3	0	2	1	2	5	−3	2	

Notes:
22 June 2013
18:00

Mexico	1–2	Greece
Espericueta 40'	Report	Bouchalakis 16'; Kolovos 89'

Kamil Ocak Stadium, Gaziantep
Attendance: 3,000
Referee: Peter O'Leary (New Zealand)

22 June 2013
21:00

Paraguay	1–1	Mali
Rojas 7'	Report	Niane 3'

Kamil Ocak Stadium, Gaziantep
Attendance: 3,000
Referee: Nawaf Shukralla (Bahrain)

25 June 2013
18:00

Mexico	0–1	Paraguay
	Report	González 52'

Kamil Ocak Stadium, Gaziantep
Attendance: 1,200
Referee: Nicola Rizzoli (Italy)

25 June 2013
21:00

Mali	0–0	Greece
	Report

Kamil Ocak Stadium, Gaziantep
Attendance: 1,200
Referee: Roberto Moreno (Panama)

28 June 2013
18:00

Greece	1–1	Paraguay
Diamantakos 68'	Report	Montenegro 73'

Hüseyin Avni Aker Stadium, Trabzon
Attendance: 11,826
Referee: Bakary Gassama (Gambia)

28 June 2013
18:00

Mali	1–4	Mexico
Diallo 62'	Report	Bueno 2'; Corona 13'; Escoboza 69'; Luna 86'

Kamil Ocak Stadium, Gaziantep
Attendance: 2,000
Referee: Cüneyt Çakır (Turkey)

=== Group E ===
Pos	Team	Pld	W	D	L	GF	GA	GD	Pts	Group stage result
1	Iraq	3	2	1	0	6	4	+2	7	Advance to knockout stage
2	Chile	3	1	1	1	4	4	0	4	Advance to knockout stage
3	Egypt	3	1	0	2	4	4	0	3	
4	England	3	0	2	1	3	5	−2	2	

23 June 2013
18:00

Chile	2–1	Egypt
Castillo 25'; Bravo 77'	Report	Kahraba 10'

Akdeniz University Stadium, Antalya
Attendance: 3,148
Referee: Jonas Eriksson (Sweden)

23 June 2013
21:00

England	2–2	Iraq
Coady 41'; Williams 52'	Report	Faez 75' (pen.); Adnan 90+3'

Akdeniz University Stadium, Antalya
Attendance: 3,148
Referee: Roberto García (Mexico)

26 June 2013
18:00

Chile	1–1	England
Castillo 32' (pen.)	Report	Kane 64'

Akdeniz University Stadium, Antalya
Attendance: 3,246
Referee: Alireza Faghani (Iran)

26 June 2013
21:00

Iraq	2–1	Egypt
Abdul-Hussein 33'; Abdul-Raheem 79'	Report	Koka 27'

Akdeniz University Stadium, Antalya
Attendance: 3,246
Referee: Damir Skomina (Slovenia)

29 June 2013
21:00

Iraq	2–1	Chile
Kamil 15'; Salman 67'	Report	Mora 28'

Akdeniz University Stadium, Antalya
Attendance: 2,785
Referee: Stéphane Lannoy (France)

29 June 2013
21:00

Egypt	2–0	England
Trezeguet 79'; Koka 90+3'	Report

Atatürk Stadium, Bursa
Attendance: 3,445
Referee: Antonio Arias (Paraguay)

=== Group F ===
Pos	Team	Pld	W	D	L	GF	GA	GD	Pts	Group stage result
1	Croatia	3	2	1	0	4	2	+2	7	Advance to knockout stage
2	Uruguay	3	2	0	1	6	1	+5	6	Advance to knockout stage
3	Uzbekistan	3	1	1	1	4	5	−1	4	Advance to knockout stage
4	New Zealand	3	0	0	3	1	7	−6	0	

23 June 2013
17:00

New Zealand	0–3	Uzbekistan
	Report	Makhstaliev 14'; Sergeev 53'; Turapov 67'

Atatürk Stadium, Bursa
Attendance: 3,597
Referee: Antonio Arias (Paraguay)

23 June 2013
20:00

Uruguay	0–1	Croatia
	Report	Rebić 41'

Atatürk Stadium, Bursa
Attendance: 3,597
Referee: Néant Alioum (Cameroon)

26 June 2013
18:00

New Zealand	0–2	Uruguay
	Report	De Arrascaeta 4'; López 75'

Atatürk Stadium, Bursa
Attendance: 3,393
Referee: Alberto Undiano Mallenco (Spain)

26 June 2013
21:00

Croatia	1–1	Uzbekistan
Livaja 65'	Report	Rakhmonov 24'

Atatürk Stadium, Bursa
Attendance: 3,393
Referee: Víctor Hugo Carrillo (Peru)

29 June 2013
18:00

Uzbekistan	0–4	Uruguay
	Report	Gino 38'; López 47'; De Arrascaeta 64'; Bentancourt 77'

Akdeniz University Stadium, Antalya
Attendance: 2,785
Referee: Viktor Kassai (Hungary)

29 June 2013
18:00

Croatia	2–1	New Zealand
Perica 11'; Rebić 75'	Report	Fenton 84' (pen.)

Atatürk Stadium, Bursa
Attendance: 3,445
Referee: Sandro Ricci (Brazil)

=== Ranking of third-placed teams ===
The four best teams among those ranked third were determined as follows:

1. points obtained in all group matches;
2. goal difference in all group matches;
3. number of goals scored in all group matches;
4. drawing of lots by the FIFA Organising Committee.

Pos	Grp	Team	Pld	W	D	L	GF	GA	GD	Pts	Result
1	B	South Korea	3	1	1	1	4	4	0	4	Advance to knockout stage
2	F	Uzbekistan	3	1	1	1	4	5	−1	4	Advance to knockout stage
3	D	Mexico	3	1	0	2	5	4	+1	3	Advance to knockout stage
4	A	Ghana	3	1	0	2	5	5	0	3	Advance to knockout stage
5	E	Egypt	3	1	0	2	4	4	0	3	
6	C	El Salvador	3	1	0	2	2	7	−5	3	

== Knockout stage ==
In the knockout stages, if a match was level at the end of normal playing time, extra time was played (two periods of fifteen minutes each) and followed, if necessary, by a penalty shoot-out to determine the winner, except for the play-off for third place, where no extra time would be played as the match was played directly before the final.

Round of 16
2 July — Gaziantep
France	4
Turkey	1
2 July — Gaziantep
Greece	1
Uzbekistan	3
3 July — Kayseri
Portugal	2
Ghana	3
3 July — Bursa
Croatia	0
Chile	2
3 July — Antalya
Iraq (a.e.t.)	1
Paraguay	0
3 July — Trabzon
Colombia	1 (7)
South Korea (p)	1 (8)
2 July — Istanbul
Nigeria	1
Uruguay	2
2 July — Istanbul
Spain	2
Mexico	1

Quarter-finals
6 July — Rize
France	4
Uzbekistan	0
7 July — Istanbul
Ghana (a.e.t.)	4
Chile	3
7 July — Kayseri
Iraq (p)	3 (5)
South Korea	3 (4)
6 July — Bursa
Uruguay (a.e.t.)	1
Spain	0

Semi-finals
10 July — Bursa
France	2
Ghana	1
10 July — Trabzon
Iraq	1 (6)
Uruguay (p)	1 (7)

Final
13 July — Istanbul
France (p)	0 (4)
Uruguay	0 (1)
Third place
13 July — Istanbul
Ghana	3
Iraq	0

=== Round of 16 ===
2 July 2013
18:00

Spain	2–1	Mexico
Derik 74'; Jesé 90'	Report	González 2'

Ali Sami Yen Spor Kompleksi, Istanbul
Attendance: 7,211
Referee: Alireza Faghani (Iran)

2 July 2013
18:00

Greece	1–3	Uzbekistan
Stafylidis 33' (pen.)	Report	Makhstaliev 27'; Sergeev 62' (pen.); Rakhmanov 83' (pen.)

Kamil Ocak Stadium, Gaziantep
Attendance: 14,800
Referee: Noumandiez Doué (Ivory Coast)

2 July 2013
21:00

Nigeria	1–2	Uruguay
Kayode 69'	Report	López 65', 84' (pen.)

Ali Sami Yen Spor Kompleksi, Istanbul
Attendance: 7,211
Referee: Milorad Mažić (Serbia)

2 July 2013
21:00

France	4–1	Turkey
Kondogbia 18'; Bahebeck 34'; Sanogo 68'; Veretout 74'	Report	Bakış 77'

Kamil Ocak Stadium, Gaziantep
Attendance: 14,800
Referee: Alberto Undiano Mallenco (Spain)

3 July 2013
18:00

Portugal	2–3	Ghana
Ferreira 71'; Ié 73'	Report	Ashia 19'; Anaba 79'; Boakye 85'

Kadir Has Stadium, Kayseri
Attendance: 4,977
Referee: Carlos Vera (Ecuador)

3 July 2013
18:00

Croatia	0–2	Chile
	Report	Castillo 81'; Šimunović 85' (o.g.)

Atatürk Stadium, Bursa
Attendance: 2,329
Referee: Walter López (Guatemala)

3 July 2013
21:00

Colombia	1–1 (a.e.t.)	South Korea
Quintero 90+4'	Report	Song Ju-hun 16'
Penalties
Quintero (penalty scored); Bonilla (penalty scored); Aguilar (penalty missed); Borja (penalty scored); Pérez (penalty scored); Perea (penalty scored); Mena (penalty scored); Vergara (penalty scored); Balanta (penalty missed)	7–8	(penalty scored) Woo Joo-sung; (penalty missed) Song Ju-hun; (penalty scored) Kim Sun-woo; (penalty scored) Sim Sang-min; (penalty scored) Yeon Je-min; (penalty scored) Kang Sang-woo; (penalty scored) Han Sung-gyu; (penalty scored) Cho Suk-jae; (penalty scored) Lee Gwang-hoon

Hüseyin Avni Aker Stadium, Trabzon
Attendance: 2,362
Referee: Damir Skomina (Slovenia)

3 July 2013
21:00

Iraq	1–0 (a.e.t.)	Paraguay
Shakor 94'	Report

Akdeniz University Stadium, Antalya
Attendance: 2,983
Referee: Roberto Moreno (Panama)

=== Quarter-finals ===
6 July 2013
18:00

France	4–0	Uzbekistan
Sanogo 31'; Pogba 35' (pen.); Thauvin 43' (pen.); Zouma 64'	Report

Yeni Şehir Stadium, Rize
Attendance: 2,057
Referee: Sandro Ricci (Brazil)

6 July 2013
21:00

Uruguay	1–0 (a.e.t.)	Spain
Avenatti 103'	Report

Atatürk Stadium, Bursa
Attendance: 7,035
Referee: Roberto García (Mexico)

7 July 2013
18:00

Iraq	3–3 (a.e.t.)	South Korea
Faez 21' (pen.); Shakor 42', 118'	Report	Kwon Chang-hoon 25'; Lee Gwang-hoon 50'; Jung Hyun-cheol 120+2'
Penalties
Faez (penalty scored); Ismail (penalty scored); Rubat (penalty missed); Shokan (penalty scored); Adnan (penalty scored); Shakor (penalty scored)	5–4	(penalty scored) Kim Sun-woo; (penalty missed) Yeon Je-min; (penalty scored) Han Sung-gyu; (penalty scored) Sim Sang-min; (penalty scored) Woo Joo-sung; (penalty missed) Lee Gwang-hoon

Kadir Has Stadium, Kayseri
Attendance: 5,810
Referee: Ben Williams (Australia)

7 July 2013
21:00

Ghana	4–3 (a.e.t.)	Chile
Odjer 11'; Assifuah 72', 120+1'; Salifu 113'	Report	Castillo 23'; Henríquez 27', 98'

Ali Sami Yen Spor Kompleksi, Istanbul
Attendance: 6,632
Referee: Nicola Rizzoli (Italy)

=== Semi-finals ===
10 July 2013
18:00

France	2–1	Ghana
Thauvin 43', 74'	Report	Assifuah 47'

Atatürk Stadium, Bursa
Attendance: 6,314
Referee: Nawaf Shukralla (Bahrain)

10 July 2013
21:00

Iraq	1–1 (a.e.t.)	Uruguay
Adnan 34'	Report	Bueno 87'
Penalties
Faez (penalty missed); Shokan (penalty scored); Kadhim (penalty scored); Tariq (penalty scored); Adnan (penalty scored); Abdul-Raheem (penalty scored); Kamil (penalty scored); Salman (penalty missed)	6–7	(penalty missed) Rodríguez; (penalty scored) Pais; (penalty scored) Avenatti; (penalty scored) Bueno; (penalty scored) López; (penalty scored) Rolán; (penalty scored) Giménez; (penalty scored) Silva

Hüseyin Avni Aker Stadium, Trabzon
Attendance: 3,188
Referee: Jonas Eriksson (Sweden)

=== Third place match ===
13 July 2013
18:00

Ghana	3–0	Iraq
Attamah 35'; Assifuah 45+1'; Acheampong 78'	Report

Ali Sami Yen Spor Kompleksi, Istanbul
Attendance: 20,601
Referee: Sandro Ricci (Brazil)

=== Final ===
13 July 2013
21:00

France	0–0 (a.e.t.)	Uruguay
	Report
Penalties
Pogba (penalty scored); Veretout (penalty scored); Ngando (penalty scored); Foulquier (penalty scored)	4–1	(penalty missed) Velázquez; (penalty missed) De Arrascaeta; (penalty scored) Olaza

Ali Sami Yen Spor Kompleksi, Istanbul
Attendance: 20,601
Referee: Roberto García (Mexico)

== Awards ==
The following awards were given out after the conclusion of the tournament:

adidas Golden Ball	adidas Silver Ball	adidas Bronze Ball
(France) Paul Pogba	(Uruguay) Nicolás López	(Ghana) Clifford Aboagye
adidas Golden Boot	adidas Silver Boot	adidas Bronze Boot
(Ghana) Ebenezer Assifuah	(Portugal) Bruma	(Spain) Jesé
6 goals (0 assists)	5 goals (2 assists)	5 goals (1 assist)
adidas Golden Glove
(Uruguay) Guillermo de Amores
FIFA Fair Play Award
Spain

== Goalscorers ==
With six goals, Ebenezer Assifuah is the top scorers in the tournament. In total, 152 goals were scored by 99 different players, with one of them credited as own goals.

6 goals

- (Ghana) Ebenezer Assifuah

5 goals

- (Portugal) Bruma
- (Spain) Jesé

4 goals

- (Chile) Nicolás Castillo
- (France) Yaya Sanogo
- (Uruguay) Nicolás López

3 goals

- (Colombia) Juan Quintero
- (France) Florian Thauvin
- (Iraq) Farhan Shakor
- (Nigeria) Abdul Jeleel Ajagun
- (Portugal) Aladje

2 goals

- (Chile) Ángelo Henríquez
- (Colombia) Jhon Córdoba
- (Croatia) Ante Rebić
- (Egypt) Ahmed Hassan Koka
- (France) Jean-Christophe Bahebeck
- (France) Geoffrey Kondogbia
- (Ghana) Kennedy Ashia
- (Ghana) Frank Acheampong
- (Ghana) Richmond Boakye
- (Iraq) Ali Faez
- (Iraq) Ali Adnan
- (South Korea) Kwon Chang-hoon
- (South Korea) Ryu Seung-woo
- (Nigeria) Olarenwaju Kayode
- (Nigeria) Aminu Umar
- (Spain) Gerard Deulofeu
- (Turkey) Cenk Şahin
- (Uruguay) Giorgian De Arrascaeta
- (Uzbekistan) Abbosbek Makhstaliev
- (Uzbekistan) Sardor Rakhmonov
- (Uzbekistan) Igor Sergeev

1 goal

- (Australia) Joshua Brillante
- (Australia) Daniel De Silva
- (Australia) Jamie Maclaren
- (Chile) Christian Bravo
- (Chile) Felipe Mora
- (Colombia) Andrés Rentería
- (Croatia) Marko Livaja
- (Croatia) Stipe Perica
- (Cuba) Maykel Reyes
- (Egypt) Kahraba
- (Egypt) Trezeguet
- (El Salvador) Diego Coca
- (El Salvador) José Peña
- (England) Conor Coady
- (England) Harry Kane
- (England) Luke Williams
- (France) Paul Pogba
- (France) Jordan Veretout
- (France) Thibaut Vion
- (France) Kurt Zouma
- (Ghana) Michael Anaba
- (Ghana) Joseph Attamah
- (Ghana) Moses Odjer
- (Ghana) Seidu Salifu
- (Greece) Andreas Bouchalakis
- (Greece) Dimitrios Diamantakos
- (Greece) Dimitris Kolovos
- (Greece) Kostas Stafylidis
- (Iraq) Mohannad Abdul-Raheem
- (Iraq) Ammar Abdul-Hussein
- (Iraq) Mahdi Kamil
- (Iraq) Saif Salman
- (South Korea) Jung Hyun-cheol
- (South Korea) Kim Hyun
- (South Korea) Lee Gwang-hoon
- (South Korea) Song Joo-hoon
- (Mali) Samba Diallo
- (Mali) Adama Niane
- (Mexico) Marco Bueno
- (Mexico) Jesús Corona
- (Mexico) Jesús Escoboza
- (Mexico) Jonathan Espericueta
- (Mexico) Arturo González
- (Mexico) Uvaldo Luna
- (New Zealand) Louis Fenton
- (Paraguay) Derlis González
- (Paraguay) Brian Montenegro
- (Paraguay) Jorge Rojas
- (Portugal) Tiago Ferreira
- (Portugal) Edgar Ié
- (Portugal) Ricardo
- (Portugal) Tozé
- (Spain) Paco Alcácer
- (Spain) Derik
- (Turkey) Sinan Bakış
- (Turkey) Hakan Çalhanoğlu
- (Turkey) Salih Uçan
- (Turkey) Okay Yokuşlu
- (Uruguay) Federico Gino
- (Uruguay) Felipe Avenatti
- (Uruguay) Rubén Bentancourt
- (Uruguay) Gonzalo Bueno
- (United States) Daniel Cuevas
- (United States) Luis Gil
- (United States) Shane O'Neill
- (Uzbekistan) Diyorjon Turapov

1 own goal

- (Croatia) Jozo Šimunović (playing against Chile)

== Final ranking ==
Pos	Team	Pld	W	D	L	GF	GA	GD	Pts	Final result
1	France	7	4	2	1	15	6	+9	14	Champions
2	Uruguay	7	4	2	1	10	3	+7	14	Runners-up
3	Ghana	7	4	0	3	16	12	+4	12	Third place
4	Iraq	7	3	3	1	11	11	0	12	Fourth place
5	Spain	5	4	0	1	9	4	+5	12	Eliminated in Quarter-finals
6	Chile	5	2	1	2	9	8	+1	7	Eliminated in Quarter-finals
7	Uzbekistan	5	2	1	2	7	10	−3	7	Eliminated in Quarter-finals
8	South Korea	5	1	3	1	8	8	0	6	Eliminated in Quarter-finals
9	Colombia	4	2	2	0	6	2	+4	8	Eliminated in Round of 16
10	Portugal	4	2	1	1	12	7	+5	7	Eliminated in Round of 16
11	Croatia	4	2	1	1	4	4	0	7	Eliminated in Round of 16
12	Nigeria	4	2	0	2	7	5	+2	6	Eliminated in Round of 16
13	Turkey (H)	4	2	0	2	6	6	0	6	Eliminated in Round of 16
14	Paraguay	4	1	2	1	3	3	0	5	Eliminated in Round of 16
15	Greece	4	1	2	1	4	5	−1	5	Eliminated in Round of 16
16	Mexico	4	1	0	3	6	6	0	3	Eliminated in Round of 16
17	Egypt	3	1	0	2	4	4	0	3	Eliminated in Group stage
18	El Salvador	3	1	0	2	2	7	−5	3	Eliminated in Group stage
19	England	3	0	2	1	3	5	−2	2	Eliminated in Group stage
20	Mali	3	0	2	1	2	5	−3	2	Eliminated in Group stage
21	Australia	3	0	1	2	3	5	−2	1	Eliminated in Group stage
22	United States	3	0	1	2	3	9	−6	1	Eliminated in Group stage
23	New Zealand	3	0	0	3	1	7	−6	0	Eliminated in Group stage
24	Cuba	3	0	0	3	1	10	−9	0	Eliminated in Group stage

Source: rsssf.com
(H) Hosts

== Miscellanea ==
=== Trophy ===
The winners were the first team to receive an updated version of the trophy, with Rebecca Cusack and Thomas R. Fattorini of Thomas Fattorini Ltd, Birmingham taking over from Sawaya & Moroni as suppliers of FIFA competitions.

=== Vanishing spray ===
A “vanishing spray” made its FIFA debut (versions were already in use in CONCACAF and CONMEBOL competitions) during this tournament, with referees using it to denote the ten-yard mark for an opposing defence at time of free kicks.

== Media coverage ==
=== Latin America ===
- (All Latin America): ESPN and Fox Sports (broadcast 40 matches live)
- South America and Caribbean: DirecTV Sports
- Mexico and Central America: Sky Sports Latin America
- Colombia: Caracol Televisión, RCN Televisión
- Uruguay: Monte Carlo TV, Teledoce and Tenfield / VTV (32 matches live on VTV or VTV Plus).
- Paraguay: SNT, Telefuturo, Tigo Sports (32 matches live on Tigo Sports or Tigo Sports Plus).
- Mexico: TV Azteca, Televisa, TDN (32 matches live on TDN or TDN 2).

=== Asia ===
- Indonesia: antv, tvOne

=== Europe ===
- Germany: ARD, ZDF
- Portugal: RTP
