= 2013 Toulon Tournament =

Toulon Youth Festival

Tournament details
- Host country: France
- Dates: 28 May – 8 June
- Teams: 10 (from 5 confederations)
- Venues: 6 (in 6 host cities)

Final positions
- Champions: Brazil (7th title)
- Runners-up: Colombia
- Third place: France
- Fourth place: Portugal

Tournament statistics
- Matches played: 22
- Goals scored: 49 (2.23 per match)
- Top scorer(s): (Brazil) Vinícius Araújo (Mexico) José Abella (Portugal) Aladje (3 goals each)
- Best player: (Brazil) Yuri Mamute

The 2013 Toulon Tournament was the 41st edition of the Toulon Tournament. México were the defending champions but failed to secure a spot in the finals.

== Participants ==
- France (hosts)
- Belgium
- Brazil
- Colombia
- DR Congo
- Mexico
- Nigeria
- Portugal
- South Korea
- United States

== Venues ==
Avignon	Hyères	Nice
Parc des Sports	Stade Perruc	Stade du Ray
43°55′42″N 4°50′42″E	43°7′13″N 6°8′31″E	43°43′23.98″N 7°15′31.52″E
Capacity: 17,518	Capacity: 1,410	Capacity: 18,696
Nîmes	Saint-Raphaël	Toulon
Stade des Costières	Stade Louis Hon	Stade Léo Lagrange
43°48′57.5″N 4°21′33.4″E	43°25′47″N 6°48′26″E	47°14′37″N 6°0′11″E
Capacity: 18,482	Capacity: 3,000	Capacity: 10,500

== Results ==
All times are local (UTC+2).

=== Group A ===
Team	Pld	W	D	L	GF	GA	GD	Pts	Qualification
Colombia	4	4	0	0	7	2	+5	12	Qualified for finals
France	4	2	1	1	6	4	+2	7	Qualified for 3rd place match
South Korea	4	2	1	1	3	2	+1	7	
United States	4	1	0	3	3	7	−4	3	
DR Congo	4	0	0	4	1	5	−4	0	

Source: Toulon Tournament
28 May 2013
17:30

Colombia	1–0	South Korea
Borja 63'	Report

Stade Léo Lagrange
Referee: Murad Alza Wahreh (Jordan)

28 May 2013
19:30

France	4–1	United States
Coeff 39'; Imbula 40'; Bahoken 77'; Ghezzal 80+3'	Report	Joya 72'

Stade Léo Lagrange
Referee: Artur Soares Dias (Portugal)

30 May 2013
17:30

Colombia	2–1	United States
Vergara 44'; Aguilar 49'	Report	Garcia 7'

Stade des Costières
Referee: Jérôme Efong Nzolo (Belgium)

30 May 2013
19:30

DR Congo	0–1	France
	Report	Jeannot 6'

Stade des Costières
Referee: Miguel Flores Rodríguez (Mexico)

1 June 2013
15:30

DR Congo	0–1	United States
	Report	Cuevas 75'

Stade du Ray
Referee: Artur Soares Dias (Portugal)

1 June 2013
17:30

France	0–0	South Korea
	Report

Stade du Ray
Referee: Jérôme Efong Nzolo (Belgium)

3 June 2013
17:30

DR Congo	1–2	South Korea
Manzala 39'	Report	Jo Suk-jae 34'; Kang Yoon-goo 80+1'

Parc des Sports
Referee: Miguel Flores Rodriguez (Mexico)

3 June 2013
19:30

France	1–3	Colombia
Madiba 36'	Report	Vergara 52'; Palomeque 56'; Rentería 80+2'

Parc des Sports
Referee: Murad Alza Wahreh (Jordan)

5 June 2013
17:30

South Korea	1–0	United States
Han Sung-gyu 62'	Report

Stade Louis Hon
Referee: Jérôme Efong Nzolo (Belgium)

5 June 2013
19:30

Colombia	1–0	DR Congo
Borja 33' (pen.)	Report

Stade Louis Hon
Referee: Miguel Flores Rodríguez (Mexico)

=== Group B ===
Team	Pld	W	D	L	GF	GA	GD	Pts	Qualification
Brazil	4	3	1	0	6	2	+4	10	Qualified for finals
Portugal	4	2	1	1	7	6	+1	7	Qualified for 3rd place match
Mexico	4	1	2	1	6	5	+1	5	
Nigeria	4	0	2	2	3	6	−3	2	
Belgium	4	0	2	2	3	6	−3	2	

Source: Toulon Tournament
29 May 2013
17:30

Mexico	2–0	Nigeria
Morales 27'; Abella 73'	Report

Stade Perruc
Referee: Sánchez González (Colombia)

29 May 2013
19:30

Belgium	1–2	Brazil
Vetokele 13'	Report	Yuri Mamute 45'; Araújo 53'

Stade Perruc
Referee: Kevin Terry (United States)

31 May 2013
17:30

Belgium	0–2	Portugal
	Report	Tozé 40+1'; Esgaio 62'

Stade des Costières
Referee: Sánchez González (Colombia)

31 May 2013
19:30

Brazil	1–0	Mexico
Araújo 36'	Report

Stade des Costières
Referee: Nikolay Yordanov (Bulgaria)

2 June 2013
17:30

Belgium	1–1	Nigeria
M'Poku 23' (pen.)	Report	Gero 44'

Parc des Sports
Referee: Sánchez González (Colombia)

2 June 2013
19:30

Brazil	2–0	Portugal
Yuri Mamute 10'; Danilo 11'	Report

Parc des Sports
Referee: Nikolay Yordanov (Bulgaria)

4 June 2013
17:00

Mexico	3–3	Portugal
Bueno 1'; Abella 50', 80+1'	Report	Aladje 34', 53'; Cavaleiro 72'

Stade Louis Hon
Referee: Nikolay Yordanov (Bulgaria)

4 June 2013
19:00

Brazil	1–1	Nigeria
Lima 40'	Report	Gero 53'

Stade Louis Hon
Referee: Kevin Terry (United States)

6 June 2013
17:00

Nigeria	1–2	Portugal
Ejike 79'	Report	Alves 56' (pen.); Pereira 69'

Stade Léo Lagrange
Referee: Murad Alza Wahreh (Jordan)

6 June 2013
19:00

Belgium	1–1	Mexico
Bakkali 80+3'	Report	Zamorano 31'

Stade Léo Lagrange
Referee: Kevin Terry (United States)

=== Third place play-off ===
8 June 2013
15:30

France	2–1	Portugal
Madiba 12' (pen.); Vena 33'	Report	Aladje 41'

Stade du Ray
Referee: Sánchez González (Colombia)

=== Final ===
8 June 2013
17:30

Colombia	0–1	Brazil
	Report	Araújo 3'

Stade du Ray
Referee: Artur Soares Dias (Portugal)

== Goal scorers ==
3 goals

- (Brazil) Vinícius Araújo
- (Mexico) José Abella
- (Portugal) Aladje

2 goals

- (Brazil) Yuri Mamute
- (Colombia) Jherson Vergara
- (Colombia) Miguel Borja
- (France) Paul Madiba
- (Nigeria) Alhaji Gero

1 goal

- (Belgium) Zakaria Bakkali
- (Belgium) Paul-José M'Poku
- (Belgium) Igor Vetokele
- (Brazil) Danilo
- (Brazil) Erik Lima
- (Colombia) Felipe Aguilar
- (Colombia) Cristian Palomeque
- (Colombia) Andrés Rentería
- (Democratic Republic of the Congo) Harrison Manzala
- (France) Stéphane Bahoken
- (France) Alexandre Coeff
- (France) Rachid Ghezzal
- (France) Gilbert Imbula
- (France) Benjamin Jeannot
- (France) Paul Madiba
- (France) Gaël Vena
- (South Korea) Jo Suk-jae
- (South Korea) Han Sung-gyu
- (South Korea) Kang Yoon-goo
- (Mexico) Marco Bueno
- (Mexico) Julio Morales
- (Mexico) Armando Zamorano
- (Nigeria) Bright Ejike
- (Portugal) Ricardo Alves
- (Portugal) Ivan Cavaleiro
- (Portugal) Ricardo Esgaio
- (Portugal) Ricardo Pereira
- (Portugal) Tozé
- (United States) Daniel Cuevas
- (United States) Danny Garcia
- (United States) Benji Joya

== Final standings ==
1. Brazil
2. Colombia
3. France
4. Portugal
5. South Korea
6. Mexico
7. United States
8. Nigeria
9. Belgium
10. DR Congo
