= Kwame Boahene =

Ghanaian professional footballer

Personal information
- Date of birth: 6 July 1993 (age 33)
- Place of birth: Accra, Ghana
- Height: 1.70 m (5 ft 7 in)
- Positions: Winger; attacking midfielder

Senior career*
Years	Team	Apps	(Gls)
2012–2013	Liberty Professionals	32	(22)
2016	Medeama	25	(17)
2017 to date	Asante Kotoko	67	(32)

International career
2012–2013	Ghana U20		
- * Club domestic league appearances and goals

Kwame Boahene is a Ghanaian professional footballer. He plays for Asante Kotoko in the Glo Premier League of Ghana. He was part of the Ghana national U-20 team that won silver at the 2013 African Youth Championships and bronze at the 2013 FIFA U-20 Tournament. He plays as a winger/ attacking midfielder or second striker.

== Professional career ==
On 19 October 2013 he scored for Liberty Professionals to help secure a draw with King Faisal Babes. He was the best player and top scorer at Liberty Professionals before Medeama signed him. In the Medeama SC Africa campaign he was their top scorer with five goals on two consecutive years whilst in the domestic front he netted 17 goals. Boahen joined Kotoko in 2017 for a fee in the region of $50,000 and he quickly established himself as the key man on the wings. He scored 12 goals in his first season with Kotoko but suffered an injury which kept him out for sometime. On his return, he has netted four goals in four games and provided two assists. He scored a potential Puskas goal of the year contender (A scissor kick)against Berekum Arsenal at the Baba Yara Stadium in Kumasi as Kotoko won the NC Special Tournament quarter finals game by two goals to one on Sunday June 9, 2019.

== International career ==
=== African Youth Championship ===
Boahene was part of the Ghana Under-20 national team during the qualification rounds for the 2013 African U-20 Championship. In 2013, coach Sellas Tetteh called him up, with Liberty Professional teammates Ebenezer Assifuah and Kennedy Ashia, for the Ghana Under-20 national team for the 2013 tournament in Algeria.

=== FIFA U-20 Championship, Turkey 2013 ===
Boahene was a member of the Ghana Under-20 national team that took part in the 2013 FIFA U-20 tournament in Turkey.

He has also featured for the Black Stars B team.
