= Michael Anaba =

Ghanaian professional footballer

Personal information
- Full name: Michael Anaba
- Date of birth: 5 December 1993 (age 32)
- Place of birth: Kumasi, Ghana
- Height: 1.80 m (5 ft 11 in)
- Position: Midfielder

Youth career
- Real Republicans
- Feyenoord Academy
- Windy Professionals

Senior career*
Years	Team	Apps	(Gls)
2010–2011	Windy Professionals		
2011–2013	Asante Kotoko	?	(1)
2013–2015	Elche B	48	(5)
2015–2016	Elche	3	(0)
2016	→ Alcoyano (loan)	11	(0)
2016–2017	Eldense	16	(2)
2017	Sud América	4	(0)
2017–2018	Ontinyent	29	(0)
2018–2019	Alcoyano	22	(0)
2019	AFC Eskilstuna	9	(0)
2020–2021	Al-Jahra		
2021–2022	Atzeneta	5	(0)
2022–2023	Kauno Žalgiris	9	(0)

International career
2012–2013	Ghana U20	4	(0)
- * Club domestic league appearances and goals as of 28 June 2023 (UTC)

Michael Anaba (born 5 December 1993) is a Ghanaian professional footballer.

== Club career ==
Born in Kumasi, Anaba started his professional football career with Windy Professionals, a division two football team based in Winneba. He joined Asante Kotoko in September 2011, and featured regularly for the side, also winning the Ghana Premier League in the 2012–13 campaign.

In January 2013 Kotoko blocked Anaba's move to Valencia CF. He was also linked to Parma F.C. in the same transfer window, but nothing came of it.

In late July 2013, Anaba joined Elche CF in a trial basis. On 13 August, the club agreed a fee with Kotoko, and the player signed a four-year deal late in the month.

Anaba was initially assigned to the reserves in Segunda División B. In July 2014 he was called up to the main squad for the pre-season, being definitely promoted to the first-team in the following month.

On 11 October 2014 Anaba returned to the B-side, due to the lack of opportunities in the main squad. He only made his first team debut on 30 August 2015, playing the last 13 minutes in a 2–1 Segunda División home win against Bilbao Athletic.

On 27 January 2016, Anaba was loaned to CD Alcoyano in the third level until June. Upon returning, he rescinded his contract on 30 August, and joined CD Eldense the following day.

On 23 January 2017, Anaba switched teams and countries by agreeing to a contract with Uruguayan Primera División side Sud América. On 14 August, he returned to Spain after joining third-tier club Ontinyent CF.

In July 2020, Anaba joined Kuwaiti club Al-Jahra SC. A year later, in September 2021, Anaba returned to Spain and joined Atzeneta UE.

== International career ==
Anaba was a member of the Ghana under-20's during the 2013 African U-20 Championship qualification for the 2013 African U-20 Championship. In 2013, he was named in Sellas Tetteh's 23-man squad for the 2013 tournament, hosted in Algeria. He was appointed vice-captain, and featured regularly during the tournament.

Anaba was also selected to 2013 FIFA U-20 World Cup hosted in Turkey. He was used mainly as a substitute during the competition, but started and captained his side in a 1–2 loss against France. Anaba also appeared in the third-place match, again from the bench in a 3–0 win against Iraq.

== Honours ==
Club

- Ghana Premier League: 2012–13

International

- African Youth Championship: 2013 Runners-up
- FIFA U-20 World Cup: 2013 Third place
