= Kim Hyun =

Kim Hyun may refer to:

- Kim Hyun (footballer)
- Kim Hyun (actress)
