= Ebenezer Assifuah =

Ghanaian footballer (born 1993)

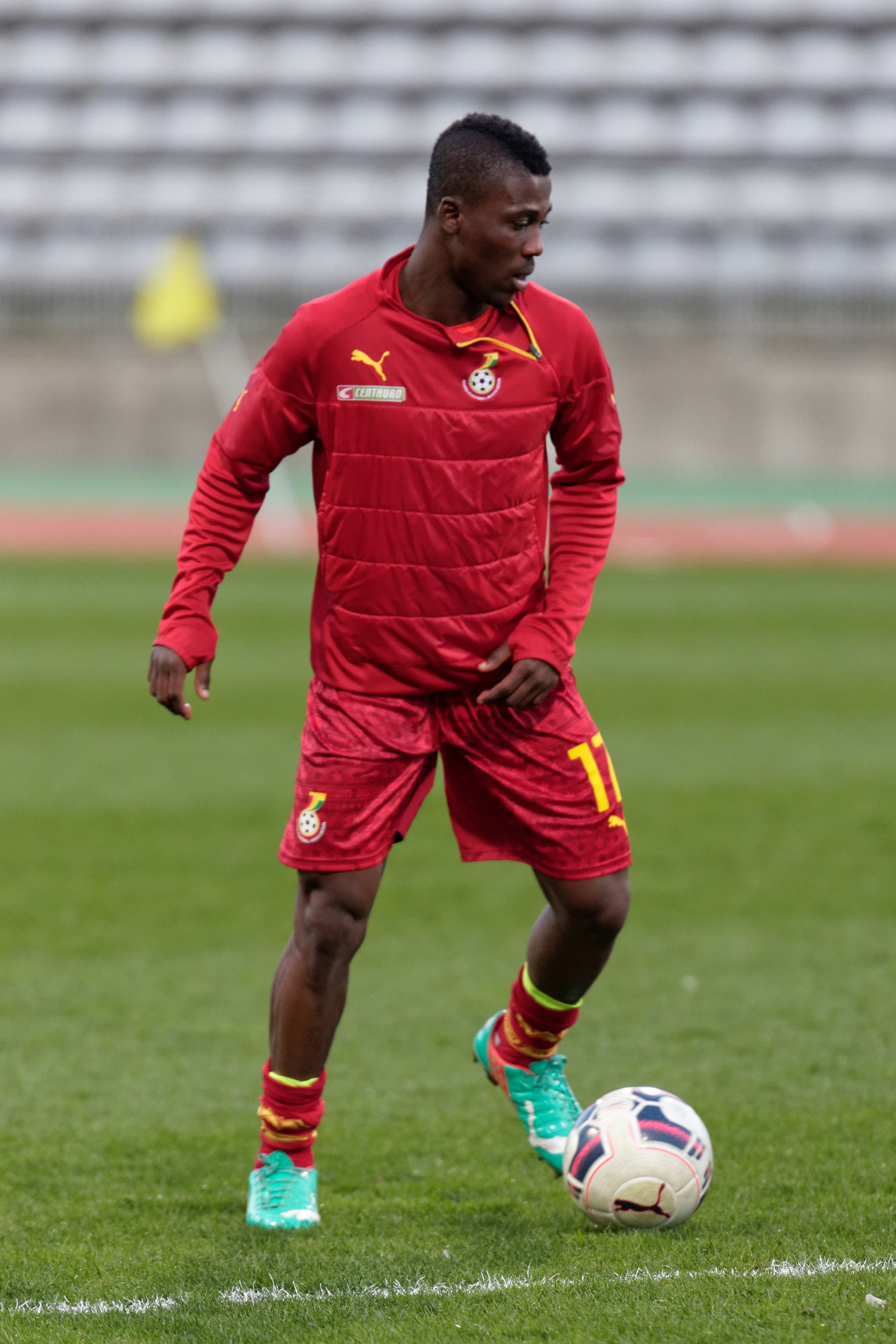
- Assifuah with Ghana in 2015

Personal information
- Full name: Ebenezer Kofi Assifuah-Inkoom
- Date of birth: 3 July 1993 (age 33)
- Place of birth: Accra, Ghana
- Height: 1.76 m (5 ft 9 in)
- Position: Striker

Team information
- Current team: Gor Mahia
- Number: 70

Youth career
- –2011: Proud United

Senior career*
Years	Team	Apps	(Gls)
2011–2012	Sekondi Eleven Wise		
2012–2013	Liberty Professionals	16	(10)
2013–2017	Sion	88	(15)
2017–2020	Le Havre	53	(12)
2020–2022	Pau	59	(11)
2023–2025	Kedah Darul Aman	19	(1)
2025–	Gor Mahia		

International career
2012–2013	Ghana U20	13	(12)
2016–2017	Ghana	1	(0)
Medal record
Representing Ghana
Men's Football
FIFA U-20 World Cup
Third place	2013 Turkey
- * Club domestic league appearances and goals

Ebenezer Kofi Assifuah-Inkoom (born 3 July 1993) is a Ghanaian professional footballer who plays as a forward for SportPesa Premier League club Gor Mahia.

Before moving to Swiss club Sion, he played for Liberty Professionals in his home country of Ghana. Assifuah has been described as a striker with power and scoring ability. Although he naturally is right-footed, he has successfully used his left foot.

Assifuah is a former Ghana international. At youth level, he played for the Ghana U20s. In 2016, he won this first cap for the Ghana national team, and was selected for the 2017 Africa Cup of Nations.

== Club career ==
=== Early career ===
Assifuah began his career with the Division One team Sekondi Eleven Wise where he attracted attention after scoring eight times in the Ghanaian Division One League.

At the end of the 2011–12 Poly Tank Division One League season, and after his success in the games of the 2013 African U-20 Championship qualification, Assifuah was highly sought after by top teams in Ghana including Ebusua Dwarfs.

=== Liberty Professionals ===
Assifuah signed a three-year contract with premiership side Liberty Professionals. He took some time to settle at Liberty Professionals after his move from Sekondi Eleven Wise. On the 2012 Boxing Day, he rediscovered his form and scored four goals against Berekum Chelsea. Prior to the end of the African Youth Championship, Assifuah had attracted the attention scouts of Italian Serie A side Udinese, and a move was deemed likely.

=== Sion ===
After being top goal scorer at the 2013 FIFA U-20 World Cup in Turkey, Assifuah moved to the Swiss side Sion signing a five-year contract. Assifuah scored his first goal in the Swiss Super League in his second game against leaders FC Basel on 28 September 2013. In the 2014–15 Swiss Cup final, he played 75 minutes of the match as Sion beat FC Basel 3–0 to win the Swiss Cup.

On 1 October 2015, Assisfuah was in the headlines at Anfield after scoring the equaliser for his team in the 2015–16 UEFA Europa League match against Liverpool, that was his debut goal in any European club competition.

In 2017, he left the club after playing for the club for four years.

=== Le Havre ===
Assifuah joined Le Havre on 18 January 2017 and signed a three-and-half-year deal. In June 2020, he left club after playing a total of 68 matches in all competitions for the club amid several injuries whilst playing for the Ligue 2 side.

=== Pau ===
On 5 June 2020, he signed a two-year contract with newly promoted Ligue 2 side Pau . He signed for the club upon the request of new coach Didier Tholot, whom he played under at Sion in Switzerland between 2014 and 2016.

On 9 March 2022, Assifuah suffered a serious anterior cruciate ligament injury, which ruled him out for the rest of the 2021–22 season. In July 2022, Assifuah's contract with Pau terminated and both parties decided to path ways.

=== Kedah Darul Aman ===
On 6 January 2023, Assifuah joined Malaysian club Kedah Darul Aman, signing a two-year contract. After nearly a year at the club, he make his debut on 24 May 2024 in a league match against Perak. Assifuah scored his first goal which resulted in a hat-trick during the 2024 Malaysia FA Cup match against Bukit Tambun in a 5–0 win on 14 June 2024.

== International career ==
=== Youth ===
Assifuah was part of the Ghana Under-20 national team during the qualification rounds for the 2013 African U-20 Championship. He scored Ghana's second goal against Uganda U20 in October 2012. In 2013, coach Sellas Tetteh called him up, along with Liberty Professional teammates Kennedy Ashia and Kwame Boahene, for the Ghana Under-20 national team ahead of the 2013 tournament in Algeria. During the competition he scored in every group match game which helped push the team into the finals with Egypt and Ghana finished as runners up of the competition. With Egyptian player Kahraba he was 2nd joint top scorer of the tournament.

Assifuah was a member of the Ghana U20 that took part in the 2013 FIFA U-20 World Cup in Turkey. He finished the tournament as the leading goal scorer with 6 goals.

=== Senior ===
On 27 March 2016, Assifuah made his first debut for the senior Ghana national team as a starter in the 2017 Africa Cup of Nations qualifiers tie with Mozambique that ended in a goalless draw. Later he was selected for 2017 Africa Cup of Nations held in Gabon, but remained on the bench throughout the tournament while his team finished in fourth place.

== Personal life ==
Assifuah sister, Gifty Assifuah is also a professional footballer.

== Honours ==
Sion

- Swiss Cup: 2014–15

Ghana U20

- FIFA U-20 World Cup third place: 2013
- African U-20 Championship runner-up: 2013

Individual

- FIFA U-20 World Cup Golden Boot: 2013
