= Farhan Shakor =

Iraqi footballer

Personal information
- Full name: Farhan Shakor Tawfeeq
- Date of birth: 15 October 1995 (age 31)
- Place of birth: Kirkuk, Iraq
- Height: 1.79 m (5 ft 10 in)
- Position: Striker

Team information
- Current team: Amanat Baghdad

Senior career*
Years	Team	Apps	(Gls)
2012–2013	Sulaymaniyah FC		(8)
2013–2014	Erbil SC		(0)
2014–2015	Al-Zawraa		(1)
2015–2016	Zakho		(1)
2016	Erbil		(6)
2016–2017	Naft Al-Wasat		(9)
2017–2018	Al-Najaf		(14)
2019	Al-Naft		(13)
2020	Al-Faisaly		
2020–2021	Dalkurd FF		
2021–2022	Al-Kahraba		
2022	Amanat Baghdad		
2022–2023	Zakho		
2023–2024	Al-Karkh		
2024	Ghaz Al-Shamal		
2024–2025	Darbandikhan		
2025–2026	Qala Diza		

International career^{‡}
2013–2014	Iraq U17	7	(3)
2014–2018	Iraq U23	1	(0)
2014	Iraq	1	(0)
- * Club domestic league appearances and goals as of 20 March 2020 ‡ National team caps and goals as of 13 July 2013

Farhan Shakor Tawfeeq (Arabic: فَرْحَان شَكُور تَوْفِيق; born 15 October 1995 in Kirkuk, Iraq) is a retired Iraqi footballer who played as a striker in the Iraqi Premier League.

== Player info ==
Farhan Shakor scored three goals during the knockout stages of the 2013 FIFA U-20 World Cup, including a brace against South Korea.

After the 2013 FIFA U-20 World Cup, Jordanian club Al-Faisaly team expressed their wish in Shakor's joining the team.

== International debut ==
On September 4, 2014 Shakor made his International debut against Peru in a friendly match that ended 0–2 for Peru.

== International goals ==
=== Iraq national under-20 team goals ===
Goals are correct excluding friendly matches and unrecognized tournaments such as Arab U-20 Championship.

Farhan Shakor – goals for Iraq under-20 Team
#	Date	Venue	Opponent	Score	Result	Competition
1	July 3, 2013	Akdeniz University Stadium, Antalya, Turkey	Paraguay	1–0	1–0	2013 FIFA U-20 World Cup
2	July 7, 2013	Kadir Has Stadium, Kayseri, Turkey	South Korea	2–1	3–3 (5–4 p.k.)	2013 FIFA U-20 World Cup
3	July 7, 2013	Kadir Has Stadium, Kayseri, Turkey	South Korea	3–2	3–3 (5–4 p.k.)	2013 FIFA U-20 World Cup

== Honours ==
Iraq U20

- 2012 AFC U-19 Championship: runner-up
- 2013 FIFA U-20 World Cup: 4th place
