= Kennedy Ashia =

Ghanaian professional footballer

Personal information
- Full name: Kennedy Ashia
- Date of birth: 13 December 1993 (age 32)
- Place of birth: Accra, Ghana
- Height: 1.71 m (5 ft 7 in)
- Position: Forward

Senior career*
Years	Team	Apps	(Gls)
2012–2015	Liberty Professionals	65	(21)
2013	→ SK Brann (loan)	0	(0)
2015–2016	Al-Hilal	21	(1)
2016–2017	AC Tripoli	21	(5)
2017–2018	Sidama Coffee	16	
2019	Darbandikhan SC		
2019–2020	Welwalo Adigrat		

International career
2012–2013	Ghana U20	8	(2)
	Ghana U23	3	(1)
2015	Ghana	2	(0)
- * Club domestic league appearances and goals

Kennedy Ashia is a Ghanaian professional footballer.

He was part of the Ghana national U-20 team that won silver at the 2013 African Youth Championships and bronze at the 2013 FIFA U-20 Tournament played in Turkey. He plays as an attacking midfielder or second striker.

== Professional career ==
Ashia began playing football with Starke F.C. before turning professional with Ghana Premier League side Liberty Professionals F.C. He joined Al-Hilal Club (Omdurman) of the Sudanese Premier League at age 22.

On 24 February 2013 he scored a brace for Liberty Professionals to help secure a draw with the then defending champions Asante Kotoko. After his exploits during the FIFA U-20 Tournament, he earned a loan move to SK Brann in the Norwegian Premier League. When his loan period ended, he returned to his parent club. Kennedy have played important role for Al Hilal and then for AC Tripoli.

On 8 September 2017, Ashia joined Ethiopian club Sidama Coffee. On 10 May 2018 it was then announced, that Ashia had parted ways with the club after 16 appearances. At the end of the month it was rumored, that Ashia had reported the club over a contractual dispute. With just a little over a month left on his contract, Ashia allegedly fell out with his employers after reminding the club of their obligations towards him.

In February 2019, Ashia alongside Richard Mpong joined Iraqi Kurdistan Division 1 League side Darbandikhan Sports Club. In September 2019, Ashia joined Ethiopian club Welwalo Adigrat on a one-year contract. At the end of February 2020, he mutually parted ways with the club after failing to impress the technical handlers of the club.

== International career ==
=== African Youth Championship ===
Ashia was part of the Ghana Under-20 national team during the qualification rounds for the 2013 African U-20 Championship. In 2013, coach Sellas Tetteh called him up, with Liberty Professional teammates Ebenezer Assifuah and Kwame Boahene, for the Ghana Under-20 national team for the 2013 tournament in Algeria.

=== FIFA U-20 Championship, Turkey 2013 ===
Ashia was a member of the Ghana Under-20 national team that took part in the 2013 FIFA U-20 tournament in Turkey.

=== 2016 African Nations Championship ===
Ashia played for Ghana's home-based player's national team in the 2016 African Nations Championship qualifying round as they were eliminated by Côte d'Ivoire 2–2 on aggregate through away goals.
