= Saif Salman =

Iraqi footballer

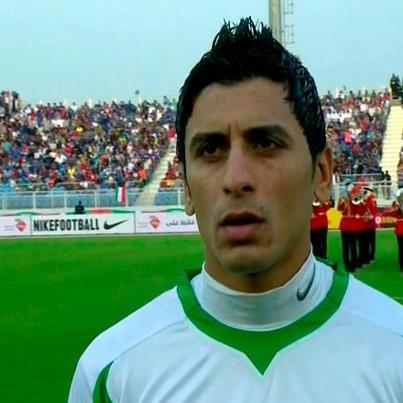

Personal information
- Full name: Saif Salman Al-Mohammedawi
- Date of birth: 1 July 1993 (age 33)
- Place of birth: Baghdad, Iraq
- Height: 1.76 m (5 ft 9 in)
- Position: Central midfielder

Team information
- Current team: Samarra

Senior career*
Years	Team	Apps	(Gls)
2009–2012	Al-Sinaa		(2)
2012–2013	Duhok SC		(2)
2013–2014	Erbil SC		
2014–2015	Al-Ittihad	11	(0)
2015	→ Hajer Club (loan)	10	(0)
2016	Al-Shorta	0	(0)
2017	Al-Suwaiq		
2017–2018	Al-Quwa Al-Jawiya		
2018–2020	Al-Talaba		
2020–2021	Zakho	1	(0)
2021	Al-Diwaniya		
2022–	Samarra		

International career^{‡}
2011–2013	Iraq U-20	15	(1)
2011–2016	Iraq U-23	10	(0)
2012–2015	Iraq	37	(0)
- * Club domestic league appearances and goals as of 21 August 2016 ‡ National team caps and goals as of 21 August 2016

Saif Salman Hashim Al-Mohammedawi (Arabic: سَيْف سَلْمَان هَاشِم الْمُحَمَّدَاوِيّ, born 1 July 1993) is an Iraqi footballer who plays as a midfielder for Samarra.

== International career ==
On December 3, 2012, Saif made his full international debut against Bahrain in a friendly match, which ended 0-0.

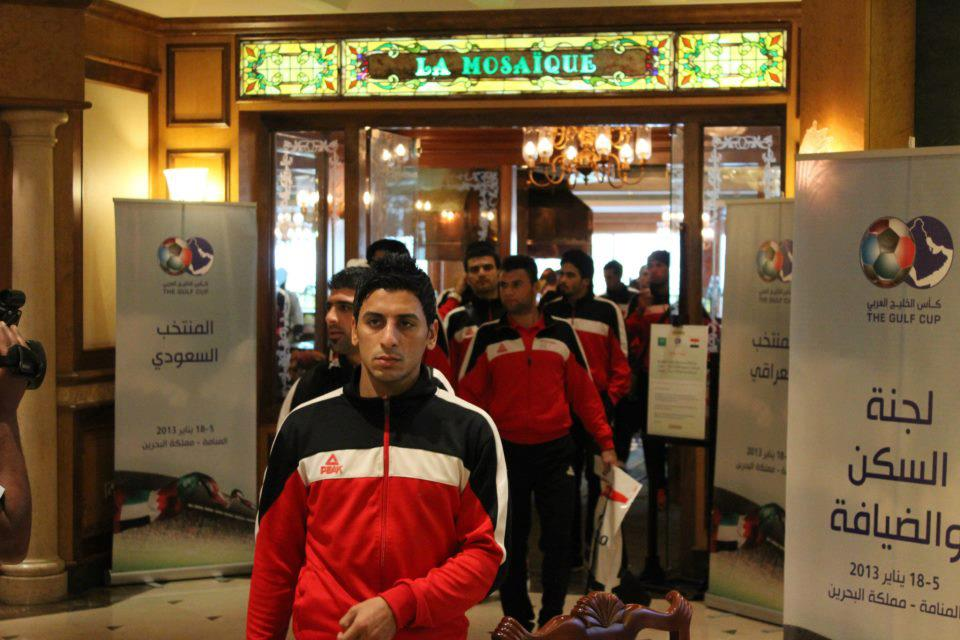
Saif during the 21st Arabian Gulf Cup.

=== International statistics ===
==== Iraq national under-20 team goals ====
Goals are correct excluding friendly matches and unrecognized tournaments such as Arab U-20 Championship.

Saif Salman – goals for Iraq national under-20 football team
#	Date	Venue	Opponent	Score	Result	Competition
1	June 29, 2013	Akdeniz University Stadium, Antalya, Turkey	Chile	2–1	2-1	2013 FIFA U-20 World Cup

== Honours ==
Iraq U-20

- 2012 AFC U-19 Championship: runner-up
- 2013 FIFA U-20 World Cup: 4th Place

Iraq U23

- AFC U-22 Championship: 2013

Iraq

- 2012 WAFF Championship: runner-up
- 21st Arabian Gulf Cup: runner-up
