= Greece national under-20 football team =

National U-20 association football team

Greece Under-20
- Nickname(s): Εθνική Ελπίδων ("National team of Hopes")
- Association: Hellenic Football Federation
First colours	Second colours

FIFA U-20 World Cup
- Appearances: 1 (first in 2013)
- Best result: Round of 16 (2013)

The Greece national under-20 football team is the national under-20 football team of Greece and is controlled by the Hellenic Football Federation, the governing body for football in Greece. The team competes in the FIFA U-20 World Cup, which is held every two years. To qualify for this tournament (which is held in odd years), the team must finish in the top six of the UEFA European Under-19 Football Championship from the previous year.

== Competitive record ==
=== FIFA U-20 World Cup ===
Year	Result	GP	W	D*	L	GS	GA
(Tunisia) 1977	Did not qualify						
(Japan) 1979	Did not qualify						
(Australia) 1981	Did not qualify						
(Mexico) 1983	Did not qualify						
(Soviet Union) 1985	Did not qualify						
(Chile) 1987	Did not qualify						
(Saudi Arabia) 1989	Did not qualify						
(Portugal) 1991	Did not qualify						
(Australia) 1993	Did not qualify						
(Qatar) 1995	Did not qualify						
(Malaysia) 1997	Did not qualify						
(Nigeria) 1999	Did not qualify						
(Argentina) 2001	Did not qualify						
(United Arab Emirates) 2003	Did not qualify						
(Netherlands) 2005	Did not qualify						
(Canada) 2007	Did not qualify						
(Egypt) 2009	Did not qualify						
(Colombia) 2011	Did not qualify						
(Turkey) 2013	Round of 16	4	1	2	1	4	5
(New Zealand) 2015	Did not qualify						
(South Korea) 2017	Did not qualify						
(Poland) 2019	Did not qualify						
(Argentina) 2023	Did not qualify						
(Chile) 2025	Did not qualify						
(Azerbaijan) (Uzbekistan) 2027	Did not qualify						
(Armenia) (Georgia (country)) 2029	To be determined						
Total	1/26	4	1	2	1	4	5

== Former squads ==
- 2013 FIFA under-20 World Cup squads - Greece

== See also ==
- Greece national football team
- Greece national under-23 football team
- Greece national under-21 football team
- Greece national under-19 football team
- Greece national under-17 football team
