= Lee Gwang-hoon =

South Korean footballer (born 1993)

Personal information
- Full name: Lee Gwang-hoon
- Date of birth: 26 November 1993 (age 32)
- Place of birth: South Korea
- Height: 1.72 m (5 ft 7 1/2 in)
- Position: Forward

Team information
- Current team: Suwon FC
- Number: 30

Youth career
- Pohang Steelers

Senior career*
| Years | Team | Apps | (Gls) |
| 2012–2015 | Pohang Steelers | 5 | (0) |
| 2015 | → Daejeon Citizen (loan) | 1 | (0) |
| 2016– | Suwon FC | 3 | (0) |

International career
| 2012–2013 | South Korea U-20 | | |
- * Club domestic league appearances and goals as of 12 December 2016

Lee Gwang-hoon (Korean: 이광훈; born 26 November 1993) is a South Korean footballer who plays as a forward for Suwon FC in K League Classic. Internationally, he represented South Korea in 2013 FIFA U-20 World Cup.

== Honours ==
Pohang Steelers

- Korean FA Cup Winner : 2012

South Korea

- AFC U-19 Championship Winner : 2012
