= Eddy Ngoy Emomo =

Congolese footballer

Emomo Eddy Ngoy
Personal information
- Date of birth: 13 October 1993 (age 33)
- Height: 1.85 m (6 ft 1 in)

Team information
- Current team: Wolkite City F.C.

Senior career*
Years	Team	Apps	(Gls)
2011	Shark XI FC		
2012	AS Kabasha		
2012-2013	US Monastir		
2013-2014	Shark XI FC		
2014-2015	DC Motema Pembe		
2015-2016	Shark XI FC		
2016-2019	AS Vita Club		
2019-2020	Smouha SC		
2021-2022	Al-Ittihad Club		
2022-	Wolkite City F.C.		

International career^{‡}
2012–	DR Congo national football team	8	(2)
- * Club domestic league appearances and goals as of 3 April 2022 ‡ National team caps and goals as of 3 April 2022

Emomo Eddy Ngoy (born 13 October 1993) is a Congolese international footballer who plays as a striker for Wolkite City F.C. in Ethiopia. He made his international début in 2012.

He was named in the Congolese squad for the 2013 African Youth Championship and for the 2014 African Nations Championship.
