= 2012 Accra Three Nations Cup =

The 2012 Sekondi Three Nations Cup was an association football exhibition competition scheduled to take place in July 2012 as part of the participating nations' preparation for the 2013 African Youth Championship qualifying stage. The tournament was open to teams under 20 years of age, although some reports say that Namibia sent their B team. The games were originally to be hosted at the Essipong Stadium in Sekondi but the Ghanaian FA relocated the tournament to Accra.

== Matches ==
Team	Pld	W	D	L	GF	GA	GD	Pts
Ghana	2	1	1	0	5	2	+3	4
Namibia	2	0	2	0	2	2	0	2
Egypt	2	0	1	1	0	3	−3	1

8 July 2012

Ghana	2 – 2	Namibia
Fatau Safiu 1'; Benjamin Fadi 12'	report	Willy Stephanus; Sadney Urikhob

Accra Sports Stadium
10 July 2012

Namibia	0 – 0	Egypt
	report

Accra Sports Stadium
12 July 2012

Egypt	0 – 3	Ghana
	report	Benjamin Fadi; Seidu Salifu; Patrick Twumasi

Accra Sports Stadium
