= Samuel Mathias =

Nigerian footballer

Personal information
- Date of birth: 23 December 1996 (age 29)
- Position: Midfielder

Team information
- Current team: Lobi Stars

Senior career*
Years	Team	Apps	(Gls)
2012	Gombe United		
2013–2016	Kano Pillars		
2017–2018	El-Kanemi Warriors		
2018–2019	Lobi Stars		
2019	Akwa United		
2020–	Lobi Stars		

International career^{‡}
2017–	Nigeria	1	(0)
- * Club domestic league appearances and goals as of 02:04, 10 February 2020 (UTC) ‡ National team caps and goals as of 09:47, 1 March 2018 (UTC)

Samuel Mathias (born 23 December 1996) is a Nigerian international footballer who plays for Lobi Stars, as a midfielder.

== Career ==
He has played club football for Gombe United and Kano Pillars.

He made his international debut for Nigeria in 2017.
