= Gece (band) =

- Origin: Ankara, Turkey
- Genres: Alternative rock, indie rock
- Years active: 2000 – present
- Label: Sony Music
- Members: Can Baydar; Eren Çilalioğlu; Gökçe Balaban; Erdem Başer
- Website: official site

Gece (English: Night) is a Turkish alternative/indie rock band.

== Band history ==
Can Baydar and Eren Çilalioğlu had been playing together since their high school days and they joined with Gökçe Balaban to form the band Gece (meaning "night") in 2000. Their lineup was completed when Erdem Başer joined them in 2004.

Gece began playing in various bars in Ankara such as Saklıkent, Limon, Manhattan and If. as well as universities and schools. In 2005 they reached the final of the Roxy Music Days contest. In 2008, they went into the studio and recorded their first album İçinde Saklı which was produced by Koray Candemir. The band continued performing and made appearances in festivals such as Masstival and Rock'n Coke. In 2010 they signed with Sony Music and released the song Gamsız as a single. After two months, they released their second album (a self-titled album) and the song Ben Öldüm on it as a video clip.

== Discography ==
- İçinde Saklı (2008) - first studio album
- Gamsız (2010) - single
- Gece (2011) - second studio album
- İyi Niyetli Bir Gün (2014) - third studio album
- Kalbe Kördüğüm (2016) - fourth studio album
- Gamsız (Single, 2010)
- Başıma Gelenler (featured by Nilüfer, 2013)
- Yıldızlar Buradan Yükseliyor (single, 2013)
- Yanımda Kal (Single, 2013)

=== Video clips ===
- İçinde Saklı
- Öldür İstersen
- Bar
- Hoşuna mı Gitti
- Gamsız
- Ben Öldüm
- Yarım
- Bana Bir Şarkı Söyle
- Yıldızlar Buradan Yükseliyor
- Yanımda Kal
- Derbeder
- Bomonti Sokakları
- İyileşmiyor
- Gönder Gelsin
- Kalbe Kördüğüm
