= Vinícius Araújo =

Brazilian footballer (born 1993)

Personal information
- Full name: Vinícius Vasconcelos Araújo
- Date of birth: 22 February 1993 (age 33)
- Place of birth: João Monlevade, Brazil
- Height: 1.76 m (5 ft 9 1/2 in)
- Position: Forward

Youth career
- 2007–2012: Cruzeiro

Senior career*
Years	Team	Apps	(Gls)
2013	Cruzeiro	24	(9)
2014–2017	Valencia	6	(0)
2014	→ Standard Liège (loan)	16	(1)
2015–2016	→ Cruzeiro (loan)	15	(3)
2016	→ Sport (loan)	32	(5)
2017	→ Huesca (loan)	22	(4)
2017–2018	Zaragoza	19	(1)
2018–2019	Vasco da Gama	5	(0)
2019	→ Avaí (loan)	15	(1)
2020–2021	Montedio Yamagata	63	(28)
2021–2022	Machida Zelvia	32	(2)
2023	Umm Salal	8	(0)
2023	FC Imabari	13	(0)
2024	Sagan Tosu	19	(1)
2025–2026	Al-Arabi	13	(0)

International career
2013	Brazil U20	10	(7)
2014	Brazil U21	9	(8)
2014	Brazil Olympic	7	(5)
- * Club domestic league appearances and goals as of 8 December 2024

Vinícius Vasconcelos Araújo (born 22 February 1993) is a Brazilian professional footballer who plays as a forward.

== Club career ==
=== Cruzeiro ===
Born in João Monlevade, Araújo joined local Cruzeiro's academy in 2007, aged 14. He made his Série A on 6 July 2013, starting in a 1–1 away draw against Portuguesa.

Eight days later, Araújo scored his first professional goals, in a 3–0 home win over Náutico. He finished the campaign with 21 appearances and eight goals (16 in the league, 1118 minutes overall), as the Raposa was crowned champions.

=== Valencia ===
On 31 January 2014, La Liga side Valencia CF bought a half of Vinícius Araújo's rights, for €3.5 million. His debut in La Liga came on 2 March 2014, as he replaced Portu in the 70th minute of a 0–1 away loss to Rayo Vallecano.

On 25 August 2014, Araújo was loaned to Belgian Pro League side Standard Liège, in a season-long deal. Sparingly used, he was loaned back to his first club Cruzeiro on 25 June 2015.

After being rarely used in Cruzeiro, Araújo joined Sport also in a temporary deal. Returning to the Che in January 2017, he scored in a Copa del Rey 2–1 loss against Celta de Vigo on the 12th before being loaned out to SD Huesca six days later.

On 1 September 2017, Araújo terminated his contract with the Che.

=== Zaragoza ===
Immediately after terminating his contract, Araújo signed a one-year deal with Real Zaragoza.

=== Vasco da Gama ===
On 3 August 2018 Vinicius was announced for Vasco da Gama.

=== FC Imabari ===
On 5 September 2023, it was announced that Vinicius has signed for FC Imabari of the J3 League. He is given squad number 39.

=== Al-Arabi ===
On 19 August 2025, Araújo joined Saudi First Division League club Al-Arabi.

== International career ==
Vinícius Araújo was called up for Brazil U20's in May 2013. The following month he was the topscorer of the 2013 Toulon Tournament, and scored Brazil's only goal in the 2013 Valais Youth Cup final against Ghana.

== Career statistics ==
=== Club ===
As of matches played on 22 September 2024.

Club	Season	League			State League (Note: Includes Campeonato Mineiro, Campeonato Pernambucano, Campeonato Carioca, Campeonato Catarinense)		National Cup (Note: Includes Copa do Brasil, Copa del Rey, Belgian Cup, Emperor's Cup, Emir Cup)		Continental		Other		Total	
Club	Season	Division	Apps	Goals	Apps	Goals	Apps	Goals	Apps	Goals	Apps	Goals	Apps	Goals
Cruzeiro	2013	Série A	16	7	5	1	3	1	—		—		24	9
Valencia	2013-14	La Liga	6	0	—		0	0	0	0	—		6	0
Valencia	2014-15	La Liga	0	0	—		0	0	—		—		0	0
Valencia	2016-17	La Liga	0	0	—		1	0	—		—		1	0
Valencia	2017-18	La Liga	0	0	—		0	0	—		—		0	0
Valencia	Total		6	0	—		1	0	0	0	—		7	0
Standard Liège (loan)	2014-15	Belgian Pro League	10	0	—		2	0	4 (Note: Appearance(s) in UEFA Europa League)	1	—		16	1
Cruzeiro (loan)	2015	Série A	12	2	0	0	2	1	0	0	—		14	3
Cruzeiro (loan)	2016	Série A	0	0	0	0	0	0	—		1 (Note: Appearance(s) in Primeira Liga)	0	1	0
Cruzeiro (loan)	Total		12	2	0	0	2	1	0	0	1	0	15	3
Sport (loan)	2016	Série A	16	2	9	2	0	0	1 (Note: Appearance(s) in Copa Sudamericana)	0	6 (Note: Appearance(s) in Copa do Nordeste)	1	32	5
Huesca (loan)	2016-17	Segunda División	20	3	—		0	0	—		2 (Note: Appearance(s) in 2017 Segunda División play-offs)	1	22	4
Zaragoza	2017-18	Segunda División	16	1	—		3	0	—		0	0	19	1
Vasco da Gama	2018	Série A	5	0	0	0	0	0	0	0	—		5	0
Vasco da Gama	2019	Série A	0	0	0	0	0	0	—		—		0	0
Vasco da Gama	Total		5	0	0	0	0	0	0	0	—		5	0
Avaí (loan)	2019	Série A	15	1	0	0	0	0	—		—		15	1
Montedio Yamagata	2020	J2 League	37	14	—		0	0	—		—		37	14
Montedio Yamagata	2021	J2 League	26	14	—		0	0	—		—		26	14
Montedio Yamagata	Total		63	28	—		0	0	—		—		63	28
Machida Zelvia	2022	J2 League	32	2	—		1	0	—		—		33	2
Umm Salal	2022-23	Qatar Stars League	8	0	—		2	0	—		2 (Note: Appearance(s) in Qatari Stars Cup)	0	12	0
Imabari	2023	J3 League	13	0	—		0	0	—		—		13	0
Sagan Tosu	2024	J1 League	18	1	—		3	3	—		2 (Note: Appearance(s) in J.League Cup)	0	23	4
Career total			250	47	14	3	17	5	5	1	13	2	299	58

== Honours ==
=== Club ===
Cruzeiro

- Campeonato Brasileiro Série A: 2013

=== International ===
Brazil U20

- Toulon Tournament: 2013
- Valais Youth Cup: 2013
