= Woo Joo-sung =

South Korean footballer (born 1993)

Woo Joo-Sung
Personal information
- Full name: Woo Joo-Sung
- Date of birth: 8 June 1993 (age 33)
- Place of birth: Busan, South Korea
- Height: 1.84 m (6 ft 0 in)
- Position: Centre-back

Team information
- Current team: Busan IPark
- Number: 5

Youth career
- 2012–2013: Chungang University

Senior career*
Years	Team	Apps	(Gls)
2014–2025	Gyeongnam FC	252	(8)
2020–2021	→ Gimcheon Sangmu (army)	32	(1)
2025	Daegu FC	18	(0)
2026–	Busan IPark	15	(1)

International career
2014	South Korea U-20	4	(0)
- * Club domestic league appearances and goals as of 5 August 2026

Woo Joo-Sung (Korean: 우주성; born 8 June 1993) is a South Korean footballer who plays as centre-back for Busan IPark.

== Career ==
He signed with Gyeongnam FC before 2014 season.

== Career statistics ==
As of match played 9 November 2024

Appearances and goals by club, season and competition
Club	Season	League			Korea Cup		Continental		Other		Total	
Club	Season	Division	Apps	Goals	Apps	Goals	Apps	Goals	Apps	Goals	Apps	Goals
Gyeongnam	2014	K League 1	9	0	0	0	—		0	0	9	0
Gyeongnam	2015	K League 2	33	2	0	0	—		—		33	2
Gyeongnam	2016	K League 2	33	0	0	0	—		—		33	0
Gyeongnam	2017	K League 2	31	3	1	0	—		—		32	3
Gyeongnam	2018	K League 1	28	0	0	0	—		—		28	0
Gyeongnam	2019	K League 1	26	1	2	0	6 (Note: Appearance(s) in AFC Champions League)	1	0	0	34	2
Gyeongnam	2020	K League 2	1	0	0	0	—		—		1	0
Gyeongnam	2022	K League 2	12	0	0	0	—		—		12	0
Gyeongnam	2023	K League 2	30	0	0	0	—		—		30	0
Gyeongnam	2024	K League 2	32	2	0	0	—		—		32	2
Gyeongnam	Total		229	8	3	0	6	1	0	0	238	9
Sangju Sangmu (Army)	2020	K League 1	8	0	0	0	—		—		8	0
Sangju Sangmu (Army)	2021	K League 2	24	1	1	0	—		—		25	1
Sangju Sangmu (Army)	Total		32	1	1	0	—		—		33	1
Career total			267	9	4	0	6	1	0	0	277	10

== Honours ==
South Korea U-20

- AFC U-19 Championship: 2012
