= Aladje =

Portuguese footballer

Personal information
- Full name: Alberto Aladje Gomes de Pina
- Date of birth: 22 October 1993 (age 33)
- Place of birth: Bissau, Guinea-Bissau
- Height: 1.87 m (6 ft 2 in)
- Position: Forward

Youth career
- 2010–2012: Padova

Senior career*
Years	Team	Apps	(Gls)
2012–2013	Chievo	0	(0)
2012–2013	→ Aprilia (loan)	21	(3)
2013–2016	Sassuolo	0	(0)
2014	→ Delta Porto Tolle (loan)	6	(2)
2014–2015	→ Pro Vercelli (loan)	1	(0)
2015	→ Real Vicenza (loan)	14	(2)
2015–2016	→ Prato (loan)	15	(1)
2016	→ Ischia (loan)	13	(4)
2016–2017	Ponsacco	27	(15)
2017–2018	Savona	28	(11)
2018–2019	Gavorrano	35	(11)
2019–2020	Messina	11	(5)
2020–2021	San Donato Tavarnelle	28	(6)
2021–2022	Ligorna	35	(11)
2022	Montecchio Maggiore	15	(6)
2023	Grosseto	19	(8)
2023–2024	Ligorna	25	(4)

International career
2012–2013	Portugal U20	18	(9)
2013	Portugal U21	1	(0)
- * Club domestic league appearances and goals as of 21:09, 1 October 2024 (UTC)

Alberto Aladje Gomes de Pina (born 22 October 1993), known as Aladje, is a Portuguese professional footballer who plays as a forward.

== Club career ==
Born in Bissau, Guinea-Bissau to a father of Portuguese descent, Aladje started playing organised football with Calcio Padova in Italy. In summer 2012, he was acquired by Serie A club AC ChievoVerona, but never represented the team officially, first being loaned to FC Aprilia in Lega Pro Seconda Divisione.

On 8 July 2014, already owned by US Sassuolo Calcio, Aladje signed with FC Pro Vercelli 1892 also in a temporary deal. His only appearance as a professional took place on 6 December of that year, when he came on as a 76th-minute substitute in a 0–4 home loss against Delfino Pescara 1936 in the Serie B.

Released by Sassuolo on 30 June 2016 without one single competitive match to his credit, Aladje continued to play in the Italian lower leagues, representing in quick succession FC Ponsacco 1920 SSD, Savona FBC and US Gavorrano. On 20 August 2019, he joined SSD FC Messina of the Serie D; in December, he suffered a knee injury which sidelined him for several months.

== International career ==
Aladje chose to represent Portugal internationally, first being selected to the 2013 FIFA U-20 World Cup in Turkey. He started for the national team in the group-stage opener against Nigeria, scoring in a 3–2 win. He added a further two in the next two games, with South Korea (2–2) and Cuba (5–0).

Aladje won his only cap for the under-21 side on 14 August 2013, playing 78 minutes in a 5–2 friendly victory over Switzerland.
