= Kang Yoon-goo =

South Korean baseball player (born 1990)

Kang Yoon-koo 강윤구
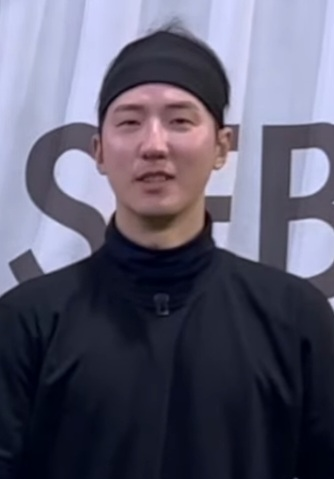

NC Dinos – No. 56
- Starting pitcher
- Born: July 10, 1990 (age 35); Seoul, South Korea
- Bats: Left Throws: Left

KBO debut
- April 30, 2009, for the Nexen Heroes

KBO statistics (through 2013 season)
- Win–loss record: 17-17
- Earned run average: 4.50
- Strikeouts: 359
- Stats at Baseball Reference

Teams
- Nexen Heroes (2009–2016); NC Dinos (2017–present)

Kang Yoon-koo (Korean: 강윤구; Hanja: 姜倫求; born July 10, 1990 in Seoul) is a South Korean starting pitcher for the NC Dinos of the KBO League.
