= Kim Sun-woo (footballer, born 1993) =

South Korean footballer

Personal information
- Full name: Kim Sun-woo
- Date of birth: 19 April 1993 (age 33)
- Place of birth: South Korea
- Height: 1.74 m (5 ft 9 in)
- Position: Midfielder

Team information
- Current team: Jeonnam Dragons
- Number: 6

Senior career*
Years	Team	Apps	(Gls)
2015	Jeju United FC	4	(0)
2015	→ Gyeongnam FC (loan)	18	(1)
2016	Jeju United FC	3	(0)
2017	Gyeongnam FC	3	(0)
2018–	Jeonnam Dragons	14	(0)

International career
2013	South Korea U20	15	
2015	South Korea U23	8	
- * Club domestic league appearances and goals as of 1 February 2019

Kim Sun-woo (Korean: 김선우; born 19 April 1993) is a South Korea international footballer who plays for Jeju United FC as a midfielder.

== Club career ==
=== Jeju United FC ===
Kim signed his first professional contract with Jeju United FC after having almost regularly featured in the South Korea National Football Team Under 20 and Under 23. Kim made 3 appearances for the club before he was loaned to Gyeongnam FC.

=== Gyeongnam FC ===
After his professional debut with Jeju United FC, Kim was loaned to Gyeongnam FC where he made 18 appearances with one goal and one assist to his name.

=== Jeju United FC ===
After his season with Gyeongnam FC, Kim returned to Jeju United FC for 2016.

== International career ==
=== South Korea U-20 National Team ===
In 2012, Kim got a series of called ups for the South Korea National under-20 Football Team to participate in various international tournaments including FIFA U-20 World cup qualification, Toulose Cup and AFC U-19 Championship. Kim also participated for Valencia Cup in three games for his country. In total, Kim represented his country for 15 games.

=== South Korea U-23 National Team ===
In 2012, Kim got a series of called ups for the South Korea National under-23 Football Team to participate in various international tournaments including the King's Cup, Toulose Cup and China friendly Cup. In total, Kim represented his country for 8 games.

== Honours ==
=== International ===
South Korea U20

- AFC U-19 Championship: 2012

South Korea U23

- King's Cup: 2015
