= Yeon Jei-min =

South Korean footballer (born 1993)

Personal information
- Full name: Yeon Jei-min
- Date of birth: 28 May 1993 (age 33)
- Place of birth: South Korea
- Height: 1.86 m (6 ft 1 in)
- Position: Centre back

Team information
- Current team: Ansan Greeners
- Number: 4

Youth career
- 2012: Hannam University

Senior career*
Years	Team	Apps	(Gls)
2013–2016	Suwon Samsung Bluewings	36	(1)
2014	→ Busan IPark (loan)	20	(0)
2017	Jeonnam Dragons	7	(0)
2018	Busan IPark	2	(0)
2019	Kagoshima United	3	(0)
2020	Suwon FC	0	(0)
2020–2021	Ansan Greeners	46	(0)
2022–2023	FC Anyang	20	(0)
2024	Suzhou Dongwu	27	(1)
2025	Hwaseong FC	18	(0)
2026–	Ansan Greeners	13	(0)

International career
2011–2013	South Korea U-20		
2013–2016	South Korea U-23		
- * Club domestic league appearances and goals as of 6 August 2026

Yeon Jei-min (Korean: 연제민; born 28 May 1993) is a South Korean footballer who plays as centre back for K League 2 club Ansan Greeners.

== Career ==
Yeon joined Suwon Samsung Bluewings in 2013 but made only 4 appearances in his debut season.

He moved to Busan IPark on loan in July 2014.

On 26 February 2024, Yeon joined China League One club Suzhou Dongwu.

== Career statistics ==
As of 31 December 2023.

Club	Season	League			Cup		Continental		Other		Total	
Club	Season	Division	Apps	Goals	Apps	Goals	Apps	Goals	Apps	Goals	Apps	Goals
Suwon Samsung Bluewings	2013	K League 1	4	0	0	0	0	0	–		4	0
Suwon Samsung Bluewings	2014	K League 1	0	0	0	0	–		–		0	0
Suwon Samsung Bluewings	2015	K League 1	22	0	0	0	1	0	–		23	0
Suwon Samsung Bluewings	2016	K League 1	10	1	1	0	4	0	–		15	1
Suwon Samsung Bluewings	Total		36	1	1	0	5	0	–		42	1
Busan IPark (loan)	2014	K League 1	20	0	1	0	–		–		20	0
Jeonnam Dragons	2017	K League 1	7	0	2	0	–		–		9	0
Busan IPark	2018	K League 2	3	0	1	0	–		–		4	0
Kagoshima United	2019	J2 League	3	0	–		–		–		3	0
Ansan Greeners	2020	K League 2	13	0	2	0	–		–		15	0
Ansan Greeners	2021	K League 2	33	0	1	0	–		–		34	0
Ansan Greeners	Total		46	0	3	0	–		–		49	0
FC Anyang	2022	K League 2	15	0	1	0	–		1	0	17	0
FC Anyang	2023	K League 2	5	0	0	0	–		–		5	0
FC Anyang	Total		20	0	1	0	–		1	0	22	0
Career total			135	1	9	0	5	0	1	0	150	1

== Honours ==
=== International ===
South Korea U-20

- AFC U-19 Championship: 2012

South Korea U-23

- King's Cup: 2015
