= Akdeniz University Stadium =

Stadium in Antalya, Turkey

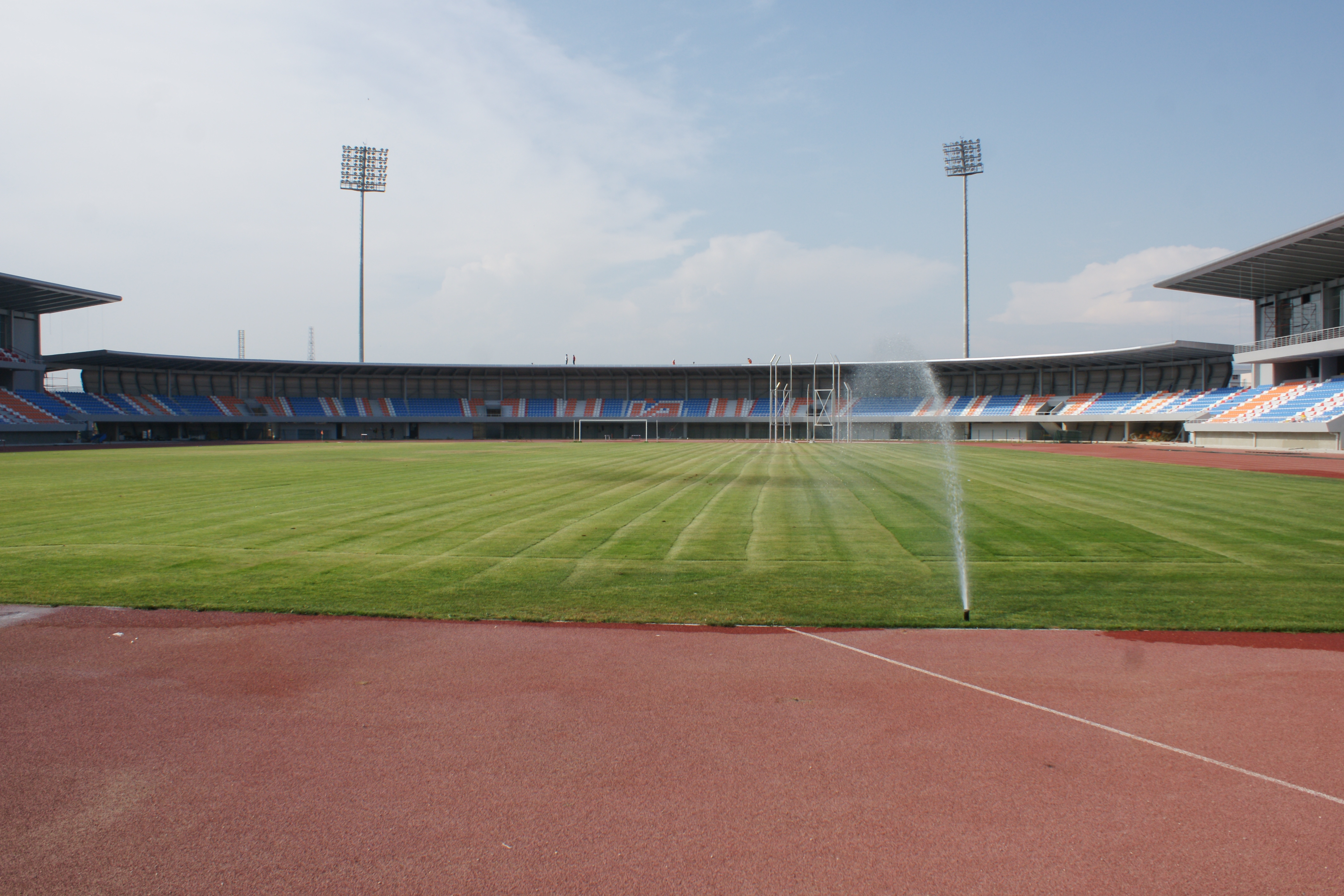
- Interactive map of Akdeniz University Stadium
- Full name: Akdeniz Üniversitesi Stadyumu
- Location: Antalya, Turkey
- Coordinates: 36°53′37″N 30°38′49″E
- Owner: Akdeniz University
- Capacity: 7,100

Construction
- Opened: 2012

Tenant
- Antalyaspor

Akdeniz University Stadium (Turkish: Akdeniz Üniversitesi Stadyumu) is a multi-use stadium at Akdeniz University, Antalya, on the Mediterranean coast of Turkey. It was home to the Turkish Süper Lig team Antalyaspor between 2012 and 2015.
