= 2013 African U-20 Championship =

بطولة إفريقيا تحت 20 سنة 2013

Tournament details
- Host country: Algeria
- Dates: 16–30 March
- Teams: 8 (from 1 confederation)
- Venues: 2 (in 2 host cities)

Final positions
- Champions: Egypt (4th title)
- Runners-up: Ghana
- Third place: Nigeria
- Fourth place: Mali

Tournament statistics
- Matches played: 16
- Goals scored: 26 (1.63 per match)
- Top scorer(s): (Nigeria) Aminu Umar (4 goals)
- Best player: (Egypt) Saleh Gomaa
- Best goalkeeper: (Egypt) Mossad Awad

The 2013 African U-20 Championship (Arabic: بطولة إفريقيا تحت 20 سنة 2013) officially known as the Orange African U-20 Championship, Algeria 2013 was the 19th edition of the African U-20 Championship. The competition was held in Algeria in the cities of Oran and Aïn Témouchent from March 16 to 30 March 2013. The semifinalists will participate in 2013 FIFA U-20 World Cup.

== Qualification ==
=== Qualified teams ===
- Algeria (hosts)
- Benin
- DR Congo
- Egypt
- Gabon
- Ghana
- Mali
- Nigeria

== Venues ==
In March 2012, the Algerian Football Federation announced that Algiers and Oran were the two candidate cities to host the competition. In May, Algiers was initially chosen as the host city of the competition. However, in August, the Algerian Football Federation announced that Oran and Aïn Témouchent would replace Algiers as the host cities, due to the lack of available stadiums in the latter city.

2013 African U-20 Championship is located in Algeria	Oran	Aïn Témouchent
2013 African U-20 Championship is located in Algeria	Ahmed Zabana Stadium	Omar Oucief Stadium
2013 African U-20 Championship is located in Algeria	Capacity: 40,000	Capacity: 11,500

== Draw ==
The draw for the tournament was held on 9 December 2012 in Cairo, Egypt.

== Officials ==
Referees

- (Algeria) Mehdi Abid Charef
- (Burkina Faso) Juste Zio
- (Burundi) Thierry Nkurunziza
- (Ethiopia) Bamlack Tessema Weyesa
- (Ivory Coast) Denis Dembele

- (Namibia) Reinhold Shikongo
- (Rwanda) Hudu Munyemana
- (Senegal) Maguette N'Diaye
- (Seychelles) Bernard Camille
- (Tunisia) Youssef Essrayri

Reserve referees

- (Democratic Republic of the Congo) Achille Madila
- (The Gambia) Bakary Camara

Assistant referees

- (Algeria) Mohamed Bechirene
- (Angola) Jerson dos Santos
- (Burkina Faso) Seydou Tiama
- (Cameroon) Elvis Guy Noupue Nguegoue
- (Chad) Issa Yaya
- (Djibouti) Yacine Hassan Egueh
- (Eritrea) Berhe Tesfargiorgh

- (Guinea) Sidiki Sidibé
- (Ivory Coast) Moussa Bayere
- (Kenya) Peter Sabatia
- (Mauritius) Balkrishna Bootun
- (Mozambique) Arsenio Marengula
- (Senegal) El Hadji Malick Samba
- (Tunisia) Anouar Hmila

Reserve assistant referees

- (Ethiopia) Kindie Mussie
- (Niger) Yahaya Mahamadou

== Group stage ==
=== Tiebreakers ===
1. Greater number of points obtained in the matches between the concerned teams
2. Best goal difference resulting from the matches between the concerned teams
3. Greatest number of goals scored in the matches between the concerned teams
4. Goal difference in all group matches
5. Greatest number of goals scored in all group matches
6. Fair Play point system in which the number of yellow and red cards are evaluated
7. Drawing of lots by CAF Organising Committee

=== Group A ===
Pos	Team	Pld	W	D	L	GF	GA	GD	Pts	Qualification
1	Egypt	3	3	0	0	4	1	+3	9	Advance to knockout stage
2	Ghana	3	2	0	1	4	2	+2	6	Advance to knockout stage
3	Benin	3	0	1	2	0	2	−2	1	
4	Algeria (H)	3	0	1	2	0	3	−3	1	

Rules for classification: Group tiebreakers
(H) Hosts
16 March 2013
17:30

Algeria	0–0	Benin

Omar Oucief Stadium, Aïn Témouchent
Referee: Bernard Camille (Seychelles)
16 March 2013
20:30

Ghana	1–2	Egypt
Assifuah 76'		Hamad 67'; Gomaa 87' (pen.)

Omar Oucief Stadium, Aïn Témouchent
Referee: Hudu Munyemana (Rwanda)

19 March 2013
17:30

Ghana	1–0	Benin
Assifuah 56'

Omar Oucief Stadium, Aïn Témouchent
Referee: Denis Dembele (Ivory Coast)
19 March 2013
20:30

Algeria	0–1	Egypt
		Rabia 43'; Hamad (red card) 90+1'

Omar Oucief Stadium, Aïn Témouchent
Referee: Reinhold Shikongo (Namibia)

22 March 2013
17:30

Algeria	0–2	Ghana
		Salifu 5'; Assifuah 29'

Omar Oucief Stadium, Aïn Témouchent
Referee: Bamlack Tessema Weyesa (Ethiopia)
22 March 2013
17:30

Benin	0–1	Egypt
		Kahraba 22'

Ahmed Zabana Stadium, Oran
Referee: Juste Zio (Burkina Faso)

=== Group B ===
Pos	Team	Pld	W	D	L	GF	GA	GD	Pts	Qualification
1	Nigeria	3	2	0	1	4	2	+2	6	Advance to knockout stage
2	Mali	3	2	0	1	3	3	0	6	Advance to knockout stage
3	Gabon	3	1	1	1	2	1	+1	4	
4	DR Congo	3	0	1	2	2	5	−3	1	

Rules for classification: Group tiebreakers
17 March 2013
17:30

Nigeria	0–1	Mali
		Niane 12'

Ahmed Zabana Stadium, Oran
Referee: Bamlak Tessema (Ethiopia)
17 March 2013
20:30

DR Congo	0–0	Gabon

Ahmed Zabana Stadium, Oran
Referee: Mehdi Abid Charef (Algeria)

20 March 2013
17:30

Mali	2–1	DR Congo
Diallo 51'; Niane 60'		Eddy Ngoyi 55'

Ahmed Zabana Stadium, Oran
Referee: Thierry Nkurunziza (Burundi)
20 March 2013
20:30

Gabon	0–1	Nigeria
		Ajagun 21' (pen.)

Ahmed Zabana Stadium, Oran
Referee: Youssef Essrayri (Tunisia)

23 March 2013
20:30

Nigeria	3–1	DR Congo
Ajagun 34' (pen.); Umar 39', 48'		Pembele 73'

Ahmed Zabana Stadium, Oran
Referee: Hudu Munyemana (Rwanda)
23 March 2013
20:30

Mali	0–2	Gabon
		Engongah; Mayoungou (pen.)

Omar Oucief Stadium, Aïn Témouchent
Referee: Maguette N'Diaye (Senegal)

== Knockout stage ==
Semi-finals
Aïn Témouchent - 26 March
Egypt	2
Nigeria	0
Oran - 26 March
Ghana	0 (4)
Mali	0 (2)

Final
Oran - 30 March
Egypt	1 (5)
Ghana	1 (4)
Third place
Oran - 29 March
Nigeria	2
Mali	1

=== Semi-finals ===
- Originally the games were scheduled to kick-off at 17:30 and 20:30. However CAF made changes on the 10 March so that both matches started at 17:00.
26 March 2013
17:00

Egypt	2–0	Nigeria
Kahraba 46', 81'

Omar Oucief Stadium, Aïn Témouchent
Referee: Bernard Camille (Seychelles)

26 March 2013
17:00

Ghana	0–0 (a.e.t.)	Mali
Penalties
	4 – 2

Ahmed Zabana Stadium, Oran
Referee: Reinhold Shikongo (Namibia)

=== Third place match ===
29 March 2013
17:30

Nigeria	2–1	Mali
Umar 72', 82'		Keita 87'

Ahmed Zabana Stadium, Oran
Referee: Youssef Essrayri (Tunisia)

=== Final ===
30 March 2013
17:30

Ghana	1–1 (a.e.t.)	Egypt
Ofori 7' (pen.)	report	Gomaa 4' (pen.)
Penalties
Nketiah (penalty scored); Akorful (penalty scored); Atamah (penalty missed); Lartey (penalty scored); Ofori (penalty scored); Anaba (penalty missed)	4–5	(penalty missed) Rabia; (penalty scored) Gomaa; (penalty scored) Samir; (penalty scored) Refaat; (penalty scored) Kahraba; (penalty scored) Ghali

Ahmed Zabana Stadium, Oran
Attendance: 20,000
Referee: Mehdi Abid-Charef (Algeria)

== Winners ==
2013 African U-20 Championship winners

Egypt
Fourth title

== Player Awards ==
- Top goalscorer: (Nigeria) Aminu Umar
- Fair player of the tournament: (Ghana) Francis Narh
- Player of the tournament: (Egypt) Saleh Gomaa

=== Team of the tournament ===
Starting Eleven

- (Egypt) Mossad Awad
- (Egypt) Ahmed Samir
- (Mali) Boubacar Diarra
- (Egypt) Ramy Rabia
- (Ghana) Lawrence Lartey
- (Nigeria) Abdul Jeleel Ajagun
- (Ghana) Derrick Mensah
- (Egypt) Saleh Gomaa
- (Egypt) Kahraba
- (Algeria) Zinedine Ferhat
- (Ghana) Ebenezer Assifuah

Substitutes

- (Ghana) Eric Ofori Antwi
- (Mali) Tiékoro Keita
- (Ghana) Francis Narh
- (Gabon) Didier Ibrahim Ndong
- (Democratic Republic of the Congo) Emomo Eddy Ngoyi
- (Nigeria) Mohammed Goyi Aliyu
- (Benin) David Djigla
- (Egypt) Hossam Mohammed Ghaly

== Goal scorers ==
4 goals

- (Nigeria) Aminu Umar

3 goals

- (Ghana) Ebenezer Assifuah
- (Egypt) Kahraba

2 goals

- (Egypt) Saleh Gomaa
- (Mali) Adama Niane
- (Nigeria) Abdul Jeleel Ajagun

1 goal

- (Ghana) Ebenezer Ofori
- (Ghana) Seidu Salifu
- (Ghana) Jeremiah Arkorful
- (Egypt) Mahmoud Hamad
- (Egypt) Ramy Rabia
- (Mali) Samba Diallo
- (Mali) Tiékoro Keita
- (Democratic Republic of the Congo) Emomo Eddy Ngoyi

== Qualified teams for FIFA U-20 World Cup ==
The following teams from CAF qualified for the 2013 FIFA U-20 World Cup in Turkey.

Team	Qualified on	Previous appearances in FIFA U-20 World Cup^{1}
Egypt	19 March 2013	7 (1981, 1991, 2001, 2003, 2005, 2009, 2011)
Mali	20 March 2013	4 (1989, 1999, 2003, 2011)
Ghana	22 March 2013	5 (1993, 1997, 1999, 2001, **2009**)
Nigeria	23 March 2013	9 (1983, 1985, 1987, 1989, 1999, 2005, 2007, 2009, 2011)

^{1} Bold indicates champions for that year. Italic indicates hosts for that year.

== See also ==
- 2012 Accra Three Nations Cup - exhibition competition in preparation of the Championship
