= Kim Hyun (footballer) =

South Korean footballer (born 1993)

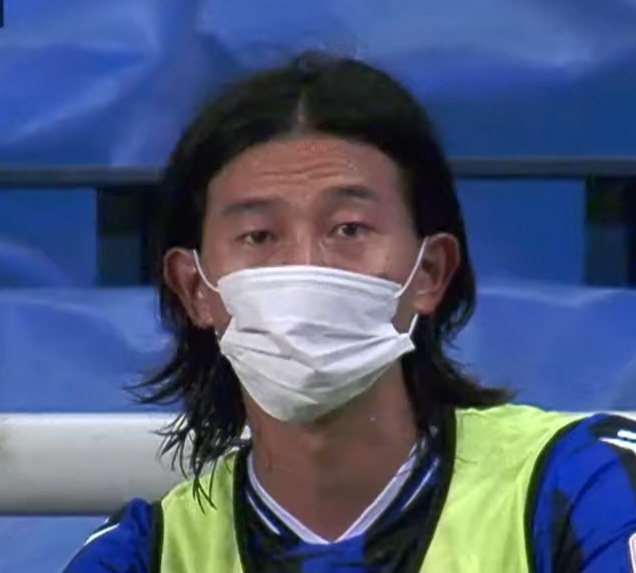

Personal information
- Date of birth: 3 May 1993 (age 33)
- Place of birth: Suwon, South Korea
- Height: 1.90 m (6 ft 3 in)
- Position: Striker

Team information
- Current team: Seoul E-Land
- Number: 8

Youth career
- Youngsaeng High School

Senior career*
Years	Team	Apps	(Gls)
2012–2013	Jeonbuk Hyundai	9	(1)
2013	→ Seongnam Ilhwa (loan)	4	(0)
2014–2019	Jeju United	70	(5)
2016	→ Seongnam FC (loan)	15	(3)
2017–2018	→ Asan Mugunghwa (army)	41	(9)
2019	→ Tochigi SC (loan)	13	(2)
2020	Hwaseong FC	7	(5)
2020	Busan IPark	7	(1)
2021	Incheon United	29	(7)
2022–2023	Suwon FC	53	(11)
2024–2025	Suwon Samsung Bluewings	41	(8)
2026–	Seoul E-Land	16	(1)

International career
2011–2013	South Korea U20	23	(4)
2013–2016	South Korea U23	29	(3)
- * Club domestic league appearances and goals as of 5 August 2026

Kim Hyun (Korean: 김현; born 3 May 1993) is a South Korean footballer who plays as a striker for K League 2 side Seoul E-Land.

== Honours ==
South Korea U20

- AFC U-19 Championship: 2012

South Korea U23

- King's Cup: 2015
