= Han Sung-gyu =

South Korean footballer (born 1993)

Personal information
- Date of birth: 27 January 1993 (age 33)
- Place of birth: Suwon, Gyeonggi-do, South Korea
- Height: 1.80 m (5 ft 11 in)
- Position: Midfielder

Youth career
- 2008–2010: Taesung High School
- 2011–2014: Kwangwoon University

Senior career*
Years	Team	Apps	(Gls)
2015–2016	Pohang Steelers	0	(0)
2016	→ Bucheon 1995 (loan)	2	(0)
2016–2017	Hwaseong		
2018	Nagaworld		

International career
2008	South Korea U17	1	(2)
2012–2013	South Korea U20	14	(1)
2015	South Korea U23	1	(0)
- * Club domestic league appearances and goals as of 14:18, 7 June 2019 (UTC)

- Han Sung-gyu
- Hangul: 한성규
- Hanja: 韓成圭
- RR: Han Seonggyu
- MR: Han Sŏnggyu

Han Sung-gyu (Korean: 한성규; born 27 January 1993) is a South Korean footballer currently playing as a midfielder. He is the brother of Han Seung-gyu.

== Career statistics ==
=== Club ===
As of 9 June 2019.

Club	Season	League			Cup		Continental		Other		Total	
Club	Season	Division	Apps	Goals	Apps	Goals	Apps	Goals	Apps	Goals	Apps	Goals
Pohang Steelers	2015	K League Classic	0	0	0	0	1 (Note: Appearances in the AFC Champions League)	0	0	0	1	0
Pohang Steelers	2016	K League Classic	0	0	0	0	0	0	0	0	0	0
Pohang Steelers	Total		0	0	0	0	1	0	0	0	1	0
Bucheon 1995 (loan)	2016	K League Challenge	2	0	0	0	–		0	0	2	0
Career total			2	0	0	0	1	0	0	0	3	0
