= 2013 African U-20 Championship qualification =

The 2013 African U-20 Championship qualification phase consisted of three rounds of two-legged matches. Some countries had a bye to the First Round. The winners of the Second Round matches qualifies for the finals.

== Preliminary round ==
The first legs were played on 20, 21 and 22 April, and the second legs on 4, 5 and 6 May 2012.

Team 1	Agg.	Team 2	1st leg	2nd leg
Tunisia	5–3	Libya	3–2	2–1
Morocco	7–2	Mauritania	5–0	2–2
Uganda	5–1	Mozambique	4–0	1–1
Central African Republic	w/o	DR Congo	—	—
Chad	3–5	Sierra Leone	2–3	1–2
Namibia	1–4	Rwanda	0–2	1–2
Niger	6–1	Liberia	3–0	3–1
Tanzania	4–3	Sudan	3–1	1–2
Zimbabwe	5–1	Botswana	4–0	1–1

== First round ==
The first legs were played on 27, 28 and 29 July, and the second legs on 10, 11 and 12 August 2012.

Team 1	Agg.	Team 2	1st leg	2nd leg
Egypt	3–0	Kenya	0–0	3–0
Congo	2–2 (a)	South Africa	2–1	0–1
Benin	3–0	Ivory Coast	3–0^{1}	0–0
Guinea	2–2 (a)	Burkina Faso	2–1	0–1
Tunisia	2–3	Gabon	2–2	0–1
Morocco	w/o^{2}	Gambia	4–0	—
Uganda	3–4	Ghana	3–1	0–3
DR Congo	3–0	Mauritius	3–0	0–0
Sierra Leone	1–3	Cameroon	1–1	0–2
Rwanda	2–4	Mali	2–1	0–3
Niger	3–4	Senegal	3–2	0–2
Tanzania	1–4	Nigeria	1–2	0–2
Zimbabwe	w/o^{3}	Angola	0–1	—
Lesotho	w/o^{4}	Zambia	—	—

^{1} The Benin v Côte d'Ivoire (1st leg) was postponed to 5 August 2012.
^{2} Gambia withdrew following the first leg.
^{3} Zimbabwe withdrew following the first leg.
^{4} Lesotho withdrew.

== Second round ==
The first legs have been played on 21, 22, 23 September 2012, and the second legs on 5, 6, 7 October 2012.

Team 1	Agg.	Team 2	1st leg	2nd leg
Egypt	2–1	Angola	2–1	0–0
South Africa	2–4	Nigeria	1–1	1–3
Benin	4–1	Senegal	3–1	1–0
Burkina Faso	2–4	Gabon	2–2	0–2
Ghana	5–4	Morocco	4–1	1–3
Cameroon	3–4	DR Congo	2–0	1–4
Zambia	2–5	Mali	2–2	0–3

== Qualified teams ==
- Algeria (hosts)
- Benin
- DR Congo
- Egypt
- Gabon
- Ghana
- Mali
- Nigeria
