= 2013 FIFA U-20 World Cup squads =

FIFA championship roster

The following is a list of all the squads of the national teams that competed at the 2013 FIFA U-20 World Cup. Each squad consisted of 21 players in total, three of whom had to be goalkeepers.

Players whose names are marked in bold have been capped at full international level.

== Group A ==
=== France ===
Head coach: Pierre Mankowski

No.	Pos.	Player	Date of birth (age)	Caps	Goals	Club
1	GK	**Alphonse Areola**	27 February 1993 (aged 20)			(French Football Federation) Paris Saint-Germain
2	DF	**Dimitri Foulquier**	23 March 1993 (aged 20)			(French Football Federation) Rennes
3	DF	Pierre-Yves Polomat	27 December 1993 (aged 19)			(French Football Federation) Saint-Étienne
4	DF	**Kurt Zouma**	27 October 1994 (aged 18)			(French Football Federation) Saint-Étienne
5	DF	**Samuel Umtiti**	13 November 1993 (aged 19)			(French Football Federation) Lyon
6	MF	**Paul Pogba**	15 March 1993 (aged 20)			(Italian Football Federation) Juventus
7	FW	Thibaut Vion	11 December 1993 (aged 19)			(Portuguese Football Federation) Porto
8	MF	**Geoffrey Kondogbia**	15 February 1993 (aged 20)			(Royal Spanish Football Federation) Sevilla
9	FW	Yaya Sanogo	27 January 1993 (aged 20)			(The Football Association) Arsenal
10	MF	Axel Ngando	13 July 1993 (aged 19)			(French Football Federation) Rennes
11	FW	Jean-Christophe Bahebeck	1 May 1993 (aged 20)			(French Football Federation) Troyes
12	DF	**Lucas Digne**	20 July 1993 (aged 19)			(French Football Federation) Lille
13	MF	**Mario Lemina**	1 September 1993 (aged 19)			(French Football Federation) Lorient
14	DF	Naby Sarr	13 August 1993 (aged 19)			(French Football Federation) Lyon
15	FW	Alexy Bosetti	23 April 1993 (aged 20)			(French Football Federation) Nice
16	GK	Maxime Dupé	4 March 1993 (aged 20)			(French Football Federation) Nantes
17	MF	**Jordan Veretout**	1 March 1993 (aged 20)			(French Football Federation) Nantes
18	DF	**Youssouf Sabaly**	5 March 1993 (aged 20)			(French Football Federation) Paris Saint-Germain
19	DF	Christopher Jullien	22 March 1993 (aged 20)			(French Football Federation) Auxerre
20	FW	**Florian Thauvin**	26 January 1993 (aged 20)			(French Football Federation) Bastia
21	GK	Paul Charruau	12 July 1993 (aged 19)			(French Football Federation) Valenciennes

=== Ghana ===
Head coach: Sellas Tetteh

No.	Pos.	Player	Date of birth (age)	Caps	Goals	Club
1	GK	Eric Ofori Antwi	20 November 1994 (aged 18)			(Ghana Football Association) Amidaus Professionals
2	DF	Jeremiah Arkorful	30 May 1994 (aged 19)			(Ghana Football Association) Tema Youth
3	MF	**Ebenezer Ofori**	1 July 1995 (aged 17)			(Ghana Football Association) New Edubiase United
4	DF	**Joseph Attamah**	22 May 1994 (aged 19)			(Ghana Football Association) Tema Youth
5	DF	**Baba Rahman**	2 July 1994 (aged 18)			(German Football Association) Greuther Fürth
6	MF	**Alfred Duncan**	10 March 1993 (aged 20)			(Italian Football Federation) Livorno
7	FW	**Frank Acheampong**	16 October 1993 (aged 19)			(Royal Belgian Football Association) Anderlecht
8	MF	Seidu Salifu	30 November 1993 (aged 19)			(Ghana Football Association) Wa All Stars
9	FW	Francis Narh	18 April 1994 (aged 19)			(Ghana Football Association) Tema Youth
10	MF	Clifford Aboagye	11 February 1995 (aged 18)			(Ghana Football Association) Inter Allies
11	DF	Daniel Pappoe	30 December 1993 (aged 19)			(The Football Association) Chelsea
12	GK	Michael Sai	24 July 1995 (aged 17)			(Ghana Football Association) Berekum Chelsea
13	DF	Richmond Nketiah	28 October 1994 (aged 18)			(Ghana Football Association) Medeama
14	DF	**Lawrence Lartey**	23 March 1994 (aged 19)			(Ghana Football Association) Ashanti Gold
15	FW	Kennedy Ashia	13 December 1993 (aged 19)			(Ghana Football Association) Liberty Professionals
16	GK	**Richard Ofori**	1 November 1993 (aged 19)			(Ghana Football Association) Wa All Stars
17	FW	**Ebenezer Assifuah**	3 July 1993 (aged 19)			(Ghana Football Association) Liberty Professionals
18	MF	Michael Anaba	5 December 1993 (aged 19)			(Ghana Football Association) Asante Kotoko
19	MF	Moses Odjer	17 August 1996 (aged 16)			(Ghana Football Association) Tema Youth
20	FW	**Richmond Boakye**	28 January 1993 (aged 20)			(Italian Football Federation) Sassuolo
21	DF	Princebell Addico	5 June 1994 (aged 19)			(Ghana Football Association) Bechem United

=== United States ===
Head coach: Tabaré Ramos

No.	Pos.	Player	Date of birth (age)	Caps	Goals	Club
1	GK	Cody Cropper	16 February 1993 (aged 20)			(The Football Association) Southampton Academy
2	DF	**DeAndre Yedlin**	9 July 1993 (aged 19)			(United States Soccer Federation) Seattle Sounders FC
3	DF	Juan Pablo Ocegueda	13 July 1993 (aged 19)			(Mexican Football Federation) Guadalajara
4	DF	**Caleb Stanko**	26 July 1993 (aged 19)			(German Football Association) SC Freiburg
5	DF	Shane O'Neill	2 September 1993 (aged 19)			(United States Soccer Federation) Colorado Rapids
6	MF	**Wil Trapp**	15 January 1993 (aged 20)			(United States Soccer Federation) Columbus Crew
7	FW	Victor Pineda	15 March 1993 (aged 20)			(United States Soccer Federation) Chicago Fire
8	MF	Benji Joya	22 September 1993 (aged 19)			(Mexican Football Federation) Santos Laguna
9	FW	Mario Rodríguez	12 May 1994 (aged 19)			(German Football Association) 1. FC Kaiserslautern
10	MF	**Luis Gil**	14 November 1993 (aged 19)			(United States Soccer Federation) Real Salt Lake
11	FW	Jose Villarreal	10 September 1993 (aged 19)			(United States Soccer Federation) LA Galaxy
12	GK	Kendall McIntosh	24 January 1994 (aged 19)			(United States Soccer Federation) Santa Clara Broncos
13	DF	Eric Miller	15 January 1993 (aged 20)			(United States Soccer Federation) Creighton Bluejays
14	DF	Javan Torre	20 October 1993 (aged 19)			(United States Soccer Federation) UCLA Bruins
15	MF	Mikey Lopez	20 February 1993 (aged 20)			(United States Soccer Federation) Sporting Kansas City
16	MF	**Kellyn Acosta**	24 July 1995 (aged 17)			(United States Soccer Federation) FC Dallas
17	FW	Danny Garcia	14 October 1993 (aged 19)			(United States Soccer Federation) FC Dallas
18	DF	Oscar Sorto	8 August 1994 (aged 18)			(United States Soccer Federation) LA Galaxy
19	FW	Alonso Hernández	1 March 1994 (aged 19)			(Mexican Football Federation) Monterrey
20	FW	Daniel Cuevas	29 July 1993 (aged 19)			(Mexican Football Federation) Santos Laguna
21	GK	**Zack Steffen**	2 April 1995 (aged 18)			(United States Soccer Federation) Maryland Terrapins

=== Spain ===
Head coach: Julen Lopetegui

No.	Pos.	Player	Date of birth (age)	Caps	Goals	Club
1	GK	Daniel Sotres	21 May 1993 (aged 20)			(Royal Spanish Football Federation) Racing Santander
2	DF	Javier Manquillo	5 May 1994 (aged 19)			(Royal Spanish Football Federation) Atlético Madrid
3	MF	**José Gayà**	25 May 1995 (aged 18)			(Royal Spanish Football Federation) Valencia
4	DF	Derik Osede	21 February 1993 (aged 20)			(Royal Spanish Football Federation) Real Madrid
5	DF	Israel Puerto	15 June 1993 (aged 20)			(Royal Spanish Football Federation) Sevilla
6	MF	**José Campaña**	31 May 1993 (aged 20)			(Royal Spanish Football Federation) Sevilla
7	FW	Rubén García	14 July 1993 (aged 19)			(Royal Spanish Football Federation) Levante
8	MF	**Suso**	19 November 1993 (aged 19)			(The Football Association) Liverpool
9	FW	**Paco Alcácer**	30 August 1993 (aged 19)			(Royal Spanish Football Federation) Getafe
10	FW	Jesé	26 February 1993 (aged 20)			(Royal Spanish Football Federation) Real Madrid
11	MF	**Juan Bernat**	1 March 1993 (aged 20)			(Royal Spanish Football Federation) Valencia
12	DF	**Diego Llorente**	16 August 1993 (aged 19)			(Royal Spanish Football Federation) Real Madrid
13	GK	Adrián Ortolá	20 August 1993 (aged 19)			(Royal Spanish Football Federation) Villarreal
14	MF	Ager Aketxe	30 December 1993 (aged 19)			(Royal Spanish Football Federation) Athletic Bilbao
15	MF	**Saúl**	21 November 1994 (aged 18)			(Royal Spanish Football Federation) Atlético Madrid
16	MF	Óliver Torres	10 November 1994 (aged 18)			(Royal Spanish Football Federation) Atlético Madrid
17	FW	**Gerard Deulofeu**	13 March 1994 (aged 19)			(Royal Spanish Football Federation) Barcelona
18	MF	**Denis Suárez**	6 January 1994 (aged 19)			(The Football Association) Manchester City
19	FW	Jairo Samperio	11 July 1993 (aged 19)			(Royal Spanish Football Federation) Racing Santander
20	DF	**Jonny**	3 March 1994 (aged 19)			(Royal Spanish Football Federation) Celta Vigo
21	GK	Rubén Yáñez^{1}	12 October 1993 (aged 19)			(Royal Spanish Football Federation) Real Madrid

1. Rubén Yáñez was called up before the tournament began to replace Kepa Arrizabalaga, who pulled out through injury.

== Group B ==
=== Cuba ===
Head coach: Raúl González

No.	Pos.	Player	Date of birth (age)	Caps	Goals	Club
1	GK	**Sandy Sánchez**	24 May 1994 (aged 19)			(Football Association of Cuba) Las Tunas
2	DF	**Andy Baquero**	17 March 1994 (aged 19)			(Football Association of Cuba) La Habana
3	DF	**Emmanuel Labrada**	19 January 1994 (aged 19)			(Football Association of Cuba) Granma
4	MF	Yolexis Collado	21 February 1994 (aged 19)			(Football Association of Cuba) La Habana
5	DF	Brian Rosales	7 March 1995 (aged 18)			(Football Association of Cuba) Matanzas
6	DF	**Yosel Piedra**	27 March 1994 (aged 19)			(Football Association of Cuba) Villa Clara
7	FW	Randy Valier	12 September 1993 (aged 19)			(Football Association of Cuba) Guantánamo
8	MF	**Jordan Santa Cruz**	7 October 1993 (aged 19)			(Football Association of Cuba) Cienfuegos
9	FW	**Maikel Reyes**	4 March 1993 (aged 20)			(Football Association of Cuba) Pinar del Río
10	FW	Héctor Morales	19 January 1993 (aged 20)			(Football Association of Cuba) La Habana
11	MF	**Dairon Pérez**	7 January 1994 (aged 19)			(Football Association of Cuba) La Habana
12	GK	**Delvis Lumpuy**	21 February 1994 (aged 19)			(Football Association of Cuba) Villa Clara
13	DF	Lazaro Mezquia	3 January 1994 (aged 19)			(Football Association of Cuba) Artemisa
14	MF	**Arichel Hernández**	20 September 1993 (aged 19)			(Football Association of Cuba) Villa Clara
15	MF	**Adrián Diz**	4 March 1994 (aged 19)			(Football Association of Cuba) La Habana
16	MF	**Daniel Luis**	11 May 1994 (aged 19)			(Football Association of Cuba) La Habana
17	MF	Pedro Anderson	9 November 1993 (aged 19)			(Football Association of Cuba) Artemisa
18	DF	**Abel Martínez**	3 June 1993 (aged 20)			(Football Association of Cuba) La Habana
19	DF	David Urgelles	24 April 1995 (aged 18)			(Football Association of Cuba) Guantánamo
20	FW	Osmani Capote	11 March 1995 (aged 18)			(Football Association of Cuba) Villa Clara
21	GK	**Elier Pozo**	20 January 1995 (aged 18)			(Football Association of Cuba) Pinar del Río

=== South Korea ===
Head coach: Lee Kwang-Jong

No.	Pos.	Player	Date of birth (age)	Caps	Goals	Club
1	GK	**Lee Chang-geun**	30 August 1993 (aged 19)			(Korea Football Association) Busan IPark
2	DF	Sim Sang-min	21 May 1993 (aged 20)			(Korea Football Association) Chung-Ang University
3	DF	Kim Yong-hwan	25 May 1993 (aged 20)			(Korea Football Association) Soongsil University
4	DF	Yeon Jei-min	28 May 1993 (aged 20)			(Korea Football Association) Suwon Samsung Bluewings
5	DF	Woo Joo-sung	8 June 1993 (aged 20)			(Korea Football Association) Chung-Ang University
6	MF	Kim Sun-woo	19 April 1993 (aged 20)			(Korea Football Association) University of Ulsan
7	MF	Ryu Seung-woo	17 December 1993 (aged 19)			(Korea Football Association) Chung-Ang University
8	MF	**Lee Chang-min**	20 January 1994 (aged 19)			(Korea Football Association) Chung-Ang University
9	FW	Kim Hyun	3 May 1993 (aged 20)			(Korea Football Association) Seongnam Ilhwa Chunma
10	MF	**Kwon Chang-hoon**	30 June 1994 (aged 18)			(Korea Football Association) Suwon Samsung Bluewings
11	MF	**Kang Sang-woo**	7 October 1993 (aged 19)			(Korea Football Association) Kyung Hee University
12	DF	Kang Yun-koo	8 February 1993 (aged 20)			(Japan Football Association) Vissel Kobe
13	DF	Park Yong-joon	21 June 1993 (aged 20)			(Korea Football Association) Suwon Samsung Bluewings
14	DF	**Song Ju-hun**	13 January 1994 (aged 19)			(Korea Football Association) Konkuk University
15	MF	Jung Hyun-cheol	26 April 1993 (aged 20)			(Korea Football Association) Dongguk University
16	FW	Lee Gwang-hoon	26 November 1993 (aged 19)			(Korea Football Association) Pohang Steelers
17	MF	Na Sung-soo	13 August 1993 (aged 19)			(Japan Football Association) Yokohama FC
18	GK	Ham Seok-min	14 February 1994 (aged 19)			(Korea Football Association) Soongsil University
19	FW	Cho Suk-jae	24 March 1993 (aged 20)			(Korea Football Association) Konkuk University
20	MF	Han Sung-gyu	27 January 1993 (aged 20)			(Korea Football Association) Kwangwoon University
21	GK	**Kim Dong-jun**	19 December 1994 (aged 18)			(Korea Football Association) Yonsei University

=== Nigeria ===
Head coach: John Obuh

No.	Pos.	Player	Date of birth (age)	Caps	Goals	Club
1	GK	Jonah Usman	10 October 1993 (aged 19)			(Nigeria Football Federation) ABS
2	DF	**Wilfred Ndidi**	16 December 1996 (aged 16)			(Nigeria Football Federation) Natalia Football Academy
3	DF	**Kingsley Madu**	12 December 1995 (aged 17)			(Nigeria Football Federation) El-Kanemi Warriors
4	DF	**Shehu Abdullahi**	12 March 1993 (aged 20)			(Nigeria Football Federation) Kano Pillars
5	DF	Johnbusco Amaefule	28 October 1994 (aged 18)			(Nigeria Football Federation) Dolphins
6	DF	Ikechukwu Okorie	18 November 1993 (aged 19)			(Nigeria Football Federation) Enyimba
7	FW	**Aminu Umar**	6 March 1995 (aged 18)			(Nigeria Football Federation) Wikki Tourists
8	MF	Michael Olaitan	1 January 1993 (aged 20)			(Hellenic Football Federation) Olympiacos
9	FW	**Olarenwaju Kayode**	8 May 1993 (aged 20)			(Nigeria Football Federation) Heartland
10	MF	Abdul Jeleel Ajagun	10 February 1993 (aged 20)			(Nigeria Football Federation) Dolphins
11	FW	**Alhaji Gero**	10 October 1993 (aged 19)			(Nigeria Football Federation) Enugu Rangers
12	MF	Ovbokha Agboyi	14 December 1994 (aged 18)			(Nigeria Football Federation) Bayelsa United
13	FW	**Samuel Emem Eduok**	31 January 1994 (aged 19)			(Nigeria Football Federation) Dolphins
14	MF	Christian Pyagbara	13 March 1996 (aged 17)			(Nigeria Football Federation) Sharks
15	DF	Moses Orkuma	19 July 1994 (aged 18)			(Nigeria Football Federation) Lobi Stars
16	FW	Uzegbu Loveday	23 November 1995 (aged 17)			(Nigeria Football Federation) Skillz F.C.
17	MF	Chidi Osuchukwu	11 October 1993 (aged 19)			(Nigeria Football Federation) Dolphins
18	FW	Edafe Egbedi	5 August 1993 (aged 19)			(Danish Football Association) Aarhus
19	MF	**Uche Henry Agbo**	4 December 1995 (aged 17)			(Nigeria Football Federation) Enyimba
20	FW	**Moses Simon**	12 July 1995 (aged 17)			(Royal Dutch Football Association) Jong Ajax
21	GK	John Felagha	27 July 1994 (aged 18)			(Royal Belgian Football Association) Eupen

=== Portugal ===
Head coach: Edgar Borges

No.	Pos.	Player	Date of birth (age)	Caps	Goals	Club
1	GK	**Bruno Varela**	4 November 1994 (aged 18)			(Portuguese Football Federation) Benfica
2	DF	**João Cancelo**	27 May 1994 (aged 19)			(Portuguese Football Federation) Benfica
3	DF	Tiago Ferreira	10 July 1993 (aged 19)			(Portuguese Football Federation) Porto
4	DF	Tiago Ilori	26 February 1993 (aged 20)			(Portuguese Football Federation) Sporting CP
5	DF	**Mica Pinto**	4 June 1993 (aged 20)			(Portuguese Football Federation) Sporting CP
6	MF	Agostinho Cá	24 July 1993 (aged 19)			(Royal Spanish Football Federation) Barcelona
7	FW	**Ricardo Pereira**	6 October 1993 (aged 19)			(Portuguese Football Federation) Vitória de Guimarães
8	MF	**João Mário**	19 January 1993 (aged 20)			(Portuguese Football Federation) Sporting CP
9	FW	Aladje	22 October 1993 (aged 19)			(Italian Football Federation) Aprilia
10	FW	Ricardo Esgaio	16 May 1993 (aged 20)			(Portuguese Football Federation) Sporting CP
11	FW	**Bruma**	24 October 1994 (aged 18)			(Portuguese Football Federation) Sporting CP
12	GK	**José Sá**	17 January 1993 (aged 20)			(Portuguese Football Federation) Marítimo
13	DF	**Tomás Dabó**	27 October 1993 (aged 19)			(Portuguese Football Federation) Braga
14	DF	**Edgar Ié**	1 May 1994 (aged 19)			(Royal Spanish Football Federation) Barcelona
15	MF	**André Gomes**	30 July 1993 (aged 19)			(Portuguese Football Federation) Benfica
16	MF	Ricardo Alves	25 March 1993 (aged 20)			(Portuguese Football Federation) Belenenses
17	MF	Tozé	14 January 1993 (aged 20)			(Portuguese Football Federation) Porto
18	MF	Tiago Silva	2 June 1993 (aged 20)			(Portuguese Football Federation) Belenenses
19	FW	**Ivan Cavaleiro**	18 October 1993 (aged 19)			(Portuguese Football Federation) Benfica
20	DF	Kiko	20 January 1993 (aged 20)			(Portuguese Football Federation) Vitória de Setúbal
21	GK	Rafael Veloso	3 November 1993 (aged 19)			(Portuguese Football Federation) Belenenses

1. Ivan Cavaleiro was called up before the tournament began due to an injury to Gonçalo Paciência.

== Group C ==
=== Colombia ===
Head coach: Carlos Alberto Restrepo

No.	Pos.	Player	Date of birth (age)	Caps	Goals	Club
1	GK	Cristian Bonilla	2 June 1993 (aged 20)			(Colombian Football Federation) Atlético Nacional
2	DF	Jherson Vergara	26 May 1994 (aged 19)			(Colombian Football Federation) Universitario Popayán
3	DF	Deivy Balanta	9 February 1993 (aged 20)			(Colombian Football Federation) Alianza Petrolera
4	DF	Andrés Correa	29 January 1994 (aged 19)			(Colombian Football Federation) Independiente Medellin
5	DF	**Felipe Aguilar**	20 January 1993 (aged 20)			(Colombian Football Federation) Alianza Petrolera
6	MF	José David Leudo	9 November 1993 (aged 19)			(Argentine Football Association) Estudiantes
7	FW	Harrison Mojica	17 February 1993 (aged 20)			(Colombian Football Federation) Deportivo Cali
8	MF	Pedro León Osorio	30 April 1994 (aged 19)			(Colombian Football Federation) Atlético Nacional
9	FW	**Jhon Córdoba**	11 May 1993 (aged 20)			(Mexican Football Federation) Chiapas
10	MF	**Juan Fernando Quintero**	18 January 1993 (aged 20)			(Italian Football Federation) Pescara
11	MF	Cristian Palomeque	2 April 1994 (aged 19)			(Colombian Football Federation) Alianza Petrolera
12	GK	Luis Hurtado	24 January 1994 (aged 19)			(Colombian Football Federation) Deportivo Cali
13	DF	**Helibelton Palacios**	11 June 1993 (aged 20)			(Colombian Football Federation) Deportivo Cali
14	MF	**Sebastián Pérez**	29 March 1993 (aged 20)			(Colombian Football Federation) Atlético Nacional
15	MF	Jaine Barreiro	19 June 1994 (aged 19)			(Colombian Football Federation) Deportes Quindío
16	MF	Luis Hernando Mena	20 May 1994 (aged 19)			(Colombian Football Federation) Boyacá Chicó
17	FW	**Andrés Rentería**	6 March 1993 (aged 20)			(Mexican Football Federation) Santos Laguna
18	DF	Yair Ibargüen	3 May 1993 (aged 20)			(Paraguayan Football Association) Olimpia
19	FW	**Miguel Borja**	26 January 1993 (aged 20)			(Colombian Football Federation) Cortuluá
20	FW	Brayan Perea	25 February 1993 (aged 20)			(Colombian Football Federation) Deportivo Cali
21	GK	Jair Mosquera	5 February 1993 (aged 20)			(Colombian Football Federation) Barranquilla

=== Turkey ===
Head coach: Feyyaz Uçar

No.	Pos.	Player	Date of birth (age)	Caps	Goals	Club
1	GK	Aykut Özer	1 January 1993 (aged 20)			(German Football Association) Eintracht Frankfurt
2	DF	Sadık Çiftpınar	1 January 1993 (aged 20)			(Turkish Football Federation) Galatasaray
3	DF	İlkay Durmuş	1 May 1994 (aged 19)			(Turkish Football Federation) Gençlerbirliği
4	DF	Hakan Çinemre	13 February 1994 (aged 19)			(Turkish Football Federation) Fenerbahçe
5	DF	**Ahmet Yılmaz Çalık**	26 February 1994 (aged 19)			(Turkish Football Federation) Gençlerbirliği
6	MF	**Salih Uçan**	6 January 1994 (aged 19)			(Turkish Football Federation) Fenerbahçe
7	MF	Taşkın Çalış	25 July 1993 (aged 19)			(Turkish Football Federation) Gaziantepspor
8	MF	**Okay Yokuşlu**	9 March 1994 (aged 19)			(Turkish Football Federation) Kayserispor
9	FW	Artun Akçakın	6 May 1993 (aged 20)			(Turkish Football Federation) Gençlerbirliği
10	MF	**Hakan Çalhanoğlu**	8 February 1994 (aged 19)			(German Football Association) Karlsruher SC
11	MF	**Halil Akbunar**	9 November 1993 (aged 19)			(Turkish Football Federation) Göztepe
12	GK	Alperen Uysal	1 January 1994 (aged 19)			(Turkish Football Federation) Galatasaray
13	MF	Cenk Şahin	22 September 1994 (aged 18)			(Turkish Football Federation) İstanbul BB
14	FW	Sinan Bakış	22 April 1994 (aged 19)			(German Football Association) Bayer Leverkusen
15	MF	Cumali Bişi	15 June 1993 (aged 20)			(Turkish Football Federation) Çaykur Rizespor
16	MF	**Alpaslan Öztürk**	16 July 1993 (aged 19)			(Royal Belgian Football Association) Beerschot
17	DF	Ethem Pülgir	2 April 1993 (aged 20)			(Turkish Football Federation) Kartalspor
18	GK	Yilmaz Aksoy	13 October 1993 (aged 19)			(Bulgarian Football Union) Etar Veliko Tarnovo
19	FW	İbrahim Yılmaz	6 February 1994 (aged 19)			(Turkish Football Federation) Darıca Gençlerbirliği
20	DF	Fatih Turan	5 April 1993 (aged 20)			(Royal Dutch Football Association) Fortuna Sittard
21	MF	**Kerim Frei**	19 November 1993 (aged 19)			(The Football Association) Fulham

=== El Salvador ===
Head coach: Mauricio Alfaro

No.	Pos.	Player	Date of birth (age)	Caps	Goals	Club
1	GK	Rolando Morales	1 March 1994 (aged 19)			(Salvadoran Football Federation) Turín-FESA
2	DF	Oliver Ayala	4 January 1994 (aged 19)			(Mexican Football Federation) León
3	MF	**Tomás Granitto**	12 June 1993 (aged 20)			(United States Soccer Federation) Florida Gulf Coast University
4	DF	Giovanni Zavaleta	27 September 1994 (aged 18)			(Salvadoran Football Federation) Turín-FESA
5	MF	Romilio Hernandez	6 June 1995 (aged 18)			(United States Soccer Federation) Baltimore Bays
6	DF	Marvin Baumgartner	13 January 1994 (aged 19)			(Swiss Football Association) Zürich
7	MF	**Jairo Henríquez**	31 August 1993 (aged 19)			(Salvadoran Football Federation) Turín-FESA
8	MF	José Villavicencio	24 January 1995 (aged 18)			(Salvadoran Football Federation) Turín-FESA
9	FW	**José Peña**	10 December 1994 (aged 18)			(Salvadoran Football Federation) Turín-FESA
10	MF	Diego Coca	26 August 1994 (aged 18)			(Salvadoran Football Federation) Turín-FESA
11	FW	**Maikon Orellana**	12 November 1993 (aged 19)			(Danish Football Association) Brøndby
12	DF	Kevin Barahona	1 October 1994 (aged 18)			(Salvadoran Football Federation) Turín-FESA
13	DF	**Miguel Lemus**	26 October 1993 (aged 19)			(Salvadoran Football Federation) Turín-FESA
14	MF	Óscar Rodríguez	16 April 1995 (aged 18)			(Salvadoran Football Federation) Atlético San José
15	MF	René Gómez	8 January 1993 (aged 20)			(Salvadoran Football Federation) Turín-FESA
16	MF	Benjamín Díaz	8 May 1993 (aged 20)			(United States Soccer Federation) University of the District of Columbia
17	DF	Kevin Ayala	15 July 1994 (aged 18)			(Salvadoran Football Federation) Turín-FESA
18	GK	Adolfo Menéndez, Jr.	3 July 1993 (aged 19)			(Salvadoran Football Federation) FAS
19	MF	Bernardo Majano	9 December 1995 (aged 17)			(United States Soccer Federation) D.C. United
20	FW	Roberto González	25 March 1993 (aged 20)			(Salvadoran Football Federation) Santa Tecla
21	GK	Carlos Cañas	9 September 1994 (aged 18)			(United States Soccer Federation) Longwood University

=== Australia ===
Head coach: Paul Okon

No.	Pos.	Player	Date of birth (age)	Caps	Goals	Club
1	GK	Paul Izzo	6 January 1995 (aged 18)			(Football Australia) Adelaide United
2	MF	**Joshua Brillante**	25 March 1993 (aged 20)			(Football Australia) Newcastle Jets
3	DF	Connor Chapman	31 October 1994 (aged 18)			(Football Australia) Newcastle Jets
4	DF	**Curtis Good**	23 March 1993 (aged 20)			(The Football Association) Newcastle United
5	DF	Scott Galloway	10 April 1995 (aged 18)			(Football Australia) Melbourne Victory
6	MF	**Jackson Irvine**	7 March 1993 (aged 20)			(Scottish Football Association) Celtic
7	MF	**Ryan Williams**	28 October 1993 (aged 19)			(The Football Association) Fulham
8	MF	Hagi Gligor	8 April 1995 (aged 18)			(Football Australia) Sydney FC
9	FW	**Adam Taggart**	2 June 1993 (aged 20)			(Football Australia) Newcastle Jets
10	FW	Corey Gameiro	7 February 1993 (aged 20)			(Football Australia) Wellington Phoenix
11	FW	**Connor Pain**	11 November 1993 (aged 19)			(Football Australia) Melbourne Victory
12	GK	Jack Duncan	19 April 1993 (aged 20)			(Football Australia) Newcastle Jets
13	DF	Reece Caira	1 July 1993 (aged 19)			(Football Australia) Western Sydney Wanderers
14	FW	**Jamie Maclaren**	29 July 1993 (aged 19)			(The Football Association) Blackburn Rovers
15	DF	**Jason Geria**	10 May 1993 (aged 20)			(Football Australia) Melbourne Victory
16	DF	David Vrankovic	11 November 1993 (aged 19)			(Football Australia) Melbourne Heart
17	DF	Andrew Hoole	22 October 1993 (aged 19)			(Football Australia) Newcastle Jets
18	DF	James Donachie	14 May 1993 (aged 20)			(Football Australia) Brisbane Roar
19	MF	Ryan Edwards	18 November 1993 (aged 19)			(The Football Association) Reading
20	MF	Daniel De Silva	6 March 1997 (aged 16)			(Football Australia) Perth Glory
21	GK	Dean Bouzanis	1 November 1995 (aged 17)			(Football Australia) Sydney FC

1. Hagi Gligor was called up before the tournament began due to an injury to Terry Antonis.

== Group D ==
=== Mexico ===
Head coach: Sergio Almaguer

No.	Pos.	Player	Date of birth (age)	Caps	Goals	Club
1	GK	Richard Sánchez	5 April 1994 (aged 19)			(United States Soccer Federation) FC Dallas
2	DF	Francisco Flores	17 January 1994 (aged 19)			(Mexican Football Federation) Cruz Azul
3	DF	**Hedgardo Marín**	21 February 1993 (aged 20)			(Mexican Football Federation) Guadalajara
4	DF	Antonio Briseño	5 February 1994 (aged 19)			(Mexican Football Federation) Atlas
5	DF	Bernardo Hernández	10 June 1993 (aged 20)			(Mexican Football Federation) Monterrey
6	MF	Armando Zamorano	3 October 1993 (aged 19)			(Mexican Football Federation) Morelia
7	MF	Jonathan Espericueta	9 August 1994 (aged 18)			(Mexican Football Federation) UANL
8	MF	**Raúl López**	23 February 1993 (aged 20)			(Mexican Football Federation) Guadalajara
9	FW	**Marco Bueno**	31 March 1994 (aged 19)			(Mexican Football Federation) Pachuca
10	MF	**Jesús Corona**	6 January 1993 (aged 20)			(Mexican Football Federation) Monterrey
11	MF	**Alfonso González**	5 September 1994 (aged 18)			(Mexican Football Federation) Atlas
12	GK	**Gibrán Lajud**	25 December 1993 (aged 19)			(Mexican Football Federation) Cruz Azul
13	DF	**José Abella**	10 February 1994 (aged 19)			(Mexican Football Federation) Santos Laguna
14	DF	Abel Fuentes	16 November 1993 (aged 19)			(Mexican Football Federation) Guadalajara
15	DF	**Josecarlos Van Rankin**	14 May 1993 (aged 20)			(Mexican Football Federation) UNAM
16	MF	Carlos Treviño	19 April 1993 (aged 20)			(Mexican Football Federation) Atlas
17	FW	Julio Morales	19 December 1993 (aged 19)			(United States Soccer Federation) Chivas USA
18	MF	Uvaldo Luna	21 December 1993 (aged 19)			(Mexican Football Federation) UANL
19	FW	Luis Madrigal	10 February 1993 (aged 20)			(Mexican Football Federation) Monterrey
20	MF	**Alonso Escoboza**	22 January 1993 (aged 20)			(Mexican Football Federation) Necaxa
21	GK	Alberto Gurrola	9 April 1993 (aged 20)			(Mexican Football Federation) Atlas

=== Greece ===
Head coach: Kostas Tsanas

No.	Pos.	Player	Date of birth (age)	Caps	Goals	Club
1	GK	**Stefanos Kapino**	18 March 1994 (aged 19)			(Hellenic Football Federation) Panathinaikos
2	DF	Nikos Marinakis	12 September 1993 (aged 19)			(Hellenic Football Federation) Panathinaikos
3	MF	**Kostas Stafylidis**	2 December 1993 (aged 19)			(German Football Association) Bayer Leverkusen
4	DF	Mavroudis Bougaidis	1 June 1993 (aged 20)			(Hellenic Football Federation) AEK Athens
5	DF	Konstantinos Triantafyllopoulos	3 April 1993 (aged 20)			(Hellenic Football Federation) Panathinaikos
6	MF	Panagiotis Ballas	6 September 1993 (aged 19)			(Hellenic Football Federation) Atromitos
7	MF	**Dimitrios Pelkas**	26 October 1993 (aged 19)			(Hellenic Football Federation) PAOK*
8	MF	Spyros Fourlanos	19 November 1993 (aged 19)			(Royal Belgian Football Association) Club Brugge
9	FW	**Dimitrios Diamantakos**	5 March 1993 (aged 20)			(Hellenic Football Federation) Olympiacos
10	MF	**Dimitris Kolovos**	27 April 1993 (aged 20)			(Hellenic Football Federation) Panionios
11	FW	**Giannis Gianniotas**	29 April 1993 (aged 20)			(German Football Association) Fortuna Düsseldorf
12	GK	**Sokratis Dioudis**	3 February 1993 (aged 20)			(Hellenic Football Federation) Aris
13	GK	Nikos Giannakopoulos	19 February 1993 (aged 20)			(Hellenic Football Federation) Panionios
14	MF	**Charalampos Lykogiannis**	22 October 1993 (aged 19)			(Hellenic Football Federation) Olympiacos
15	MF	**Dimitrios Kourbelis**	2 November 1993 (aged 19)			(Hellenic Football Federation) Asteras Tripolis
16	DF	Dimitris Konstantinidis	2 June 1994 (aged 19)			(Hellenic Football Federation) PAOK
17	FW	**Anastasios Bakasetas**	28 June 1993 (aged 19)			(Hellenic Football Federation) Asteras Tripolis
18	MF	**Andreas Bouchalakis**	5 April 1993 (aged 20)			(Hellenic Football Federation) Olympiacos
19	FW	Antonis Ranos	15 June 1993 (aged 20)			(Hellenic Football Federation) Skoda Xanthi
20	DF	Alexandros Kouros	21 August 1993 (aged 19)			(Hellenic Football Federation) Panionios
21	DF	**Dimitrios Goutas**	4 April 1994 (aged 19)			(Hellenic Football Federation) Skoda Xanthi

- Dimitrios Pelkas replaced **Taxiarchis Fountas** due to injury.

=== Paraguay ===
Head coach: Victor Genes

No.	Pos.	Player	Date of birth (age)	Caps	Goals	Club
1	GK	Diego Morel	15 December 1993 (aged 19)			(Paraguayan Football Association) Libertad
2	DF	Miller Mareco	31 January 1994 (aged 19)			(Paraguayan Football Association) Rubio Ñu
3	DF	Teodoro Paredes	1 April 1993 (aged 20)			(Paraguayan Football Association) Cerro Porteño
4	DF	**Júnior Alonso**	9 February 1993 (aged 20)			(Paraguayan Football Association) Cerro Porteño
5	DF	**Gustavo Gómez**	6 May 1993 (aged 20)			(Paraguayan Football Association) Libertad
6	MF	**Iván Ramírez**	8 December 1994 (aged 18)			(Paraguayan Football Association) Libertad
7	FW	**Antonio Sanabria**	4 March 1996 (aged 17)			(Royal Spanish Football Federation) Barcelona
8	MF	**Ángel Cardozo**	19 October 1994 (aged 18)			(Paraguayan Football Association) Rubio Ñu
9	FW	Cláudio Correa	3 May 1993 (aged 20)			(Paraguayan Football Association) Sportivo Luqueño
10	FW	**Derlis González**	20 March 1994 (aged 19)			(Paraguayan Football Association) Guaraní
11	FW	**Cecilio Domínguez**	11 August 1994 (aged 18)			(Paraguayan Football Association) Sol de América
12	GK	Alejandro Bogado	28 July 1994 (aged 18)			(Paraguayan Football Association) Guaraní
13	FW	Brian Montenegro	10 June 1993 (aged 20)			(Paraguayan Football Association) Rubio Ñu
14	DF	Aquilino Giménez	21 April 1993 (aged 20)			(Paraguayan Football Association) Olimpia
15	MF	**Robert Piris**	26 July 1994 (aged 18)			(Paraguayan Football Association) Rubio Ñu
16	MF	**Miguel Almirón**	10 February 1994 (aged 19)			(Paraguayan Football Association) Cerro Porteño
17	DF	Jorge Balbuena	7 June 1993 (aged 20)			(Paraguayan Football Association) Cerro Porteño
18	MF	**Jorge Rojas**	7 January 1993 (aged 20)			(Portuguese Football Federation) Benfica
19	DF	Matías Pérez	4 January 1994 (aged 19)			(Paraguayan Football Association) Nacional
20	FW	Juan Villamayor	29 March 1994 (aged 19)			(Paraguayan Football Association) Libertad
21	GK	Armando Vera	4 February 1993 (aged 20)			(Paraguayan Football Association) Libertad

=== Mali ===
Head coach: Moussa Keita

No.	Pos.	Player	Date of birth (age)	Caps	Goals	Club
1	GK	Fofana Ahamadou	8 September 1994 (aged 18)			(Malian Football Federation) Jeanne d'Arc
2	FW	**Hamidou Traoré**	7 October 1996 (aged 16)			(Malian Football Federation) Cercle Olympique de Bamako
3	MF	Abdoulaye Keita	5 January 1994 (aged 19)			(French Football Federation) Bastia
4	DF	**Ousmane Keita**	9 May 1994 (aged 19)			(Malian Football Federation) AS Korofina
5	FW	Samba Diallo	7 October 1994 (aged 18)			(Malian Football Federation) Djoliba AC
6	DF	**Boubacar Diarra**	18 April 1994 (aged 19)			(Congolese Association Football Federation) TP Mazembe
7	FW	Souleymane Sissoko	10 April 1996 (aged 17)			(Malian Football Federation) AS Korofina
8	MF	Mamadou Denon	27 June 1993 (aged 19)			(Malian Football Federation) Jeanne d'Arc
9	FW	**Adama Niane**	16 June 1993 (aged 20)			(French Football Federation) Nantes
10	FW	Seydou Traoré	1 January 1993 (aged 20)			(Malian Football Federation) AS Bakaridjan
11	FW	**Tiécoro Keita**	13 April 1994 (aged 19)			(French Football Federation) Guingamp
12	DF	**Mahamadou Traoré**	31 December 1994 (aged 18)			(Malian Football Federation) AS Bakaridjan
13	DF	**Issaka Samaké**	20 October 1994 (aged 18)			(Malian Football Federation) Stade Malien
14	MF	Adama Mariko	31 January 1994 (aged 19)			(Malian Football Federation) AS Korofina
15	MF	Bakary Nimaga	6 December 1994 (aged 18)			(Albanian Football Federation) Skënderbeu
16	GK	Sory Traoré	24 January 1996 (aged 17)			(Malian Football Federation) AS Bamako
17	FW	**Adama Traoré**	5 June 1995 (aged 18)			(Malian Football Federation) Cercle Olympique de Bamako
18	FW	Malick Berthé	14 September 1994 (aged 18)			(Malian Football Federation) AS Bamako
19	DF	**Youssouf Koné**	5 July 1995 (aged 17)			(Malian Football Federation) AS Bakaridjan
20	DF	**Ichaka Diarra**	18 January 1995 (aged 18)			(Malian Football Federation) Onze Createurs
21	GK	**Germain Berthé**	24 October 1993 (aged 19)			(Malian Football Federation) Onze Createurs

== Group E ==
=== Chile ===
Head coach: Mario Salas

No.	Pos.	Player	Date of birth (age)	Caps	Goals	Club
1	GK	Darío Melo	24 March 1994 (aged 19)			(Football Federation of Chile) Palestino
2	DF	Felipe Campos	8 November 1993 (aged 19)			(Football Federation of Chile) Palestino
3	DF	Alejandro Contreras	3 March 1993 (aged 20)			(Football Federation of Chile) Palestino
4	DF	**Valber Huerta**	26 August 1993 (aged 19)			(Football Federation of Chile) Universidad de Chile
5	DF	**Igor Lichnovsky**	7 March 1994 (aged 19)			(Football Federation of Chile) Universidad de Chile
6	MF	**Sebastián Martínez**	6 June 1993 (aged 20)			(Football Federation of Chile) Universidad de Chile
7	MF	Christian Bravo	1 October 1993 (aged 19)			(Croatian Football Federation) NK Konavljanin
8	DF	**Andrés Robles**	7 May 1994 (aged 19)			(Football Federation of Chile) Santiago Wanderers
9	FW	**Felipe Mora**	2 August 1993 (aged 19)			(Football Federation of Chile) Audax Italiano
10	MF	Nicolás Maturana	8 July 1993 (aged 19)			(Football Federation of Chile) Universidad de Chile
11	FW	**Ángelo Henríquez**	13 April 1994 (aged 19)			(The Football Association) Manchester United
12	GK	**Brayan Cortés**	11 March 1995 (aged 18)			(Football Federation of Chile) Deportes Iquique
13	MF	Óscar Hernández	3 July 1994 (aged 18)			(Football Federation of Chile) Unión Española
14	MF	**Bryan Rabello**	16 May 1994 (aged 19)			(Royal Spanish Football Federation) Sevilla
15	MF	**Cristián Cuevas**	2 April 1995 (aged 18)			(The Football Association) Chelsea
16	MF	César Fuentes	12 May 1993 (aged 20)			(Football Federation of Chile) O'Higgins
17	MF	**Diego Valdés**	30 January 1994 (aged 19)			(Football Federation of Chile) Audax Italiano
18	FW	**Nicolás Castillo**	14 February 1993 (aged 20)			(Football Federation of Chile) Universidad Católica
19	DF	Mario Larenas	27 July 1994 (aged 18)			(Football Federation of Chile) Unión Española
20	MF	**Claudio Baeza**	23 December 1993 (aged 19)			(Football Federation of Chile) Colo-Colo
21	GK	Álvaro Salazar	24 March 1993 (aged 20)			(Football Federation of Chile) Colo-Colo

1. Óscar Hernández was called up before the tournament began due to an injury to Ignacio Caroca.
2. Diego Valdés was called up before the tournament began due to an injury to Diego Rojas.

=== Egypt ===
Head coach: Rabie Yassin

No.	Pos.	Player	Date of birth (age)	Caps	Goals	Club
1	GK	**Mosaad Awad**	15 January 1993 (aged 20)			(Egyptian Football Association) Al Ahly
2	DF	Ibrahim El-Hadad	1 February 1993 (aged 20)			(Egyptian Football Association) Wadi Degla
3	DF	Hammad El Hambaly	2 January 1993 (aged 20)			(Egyptian Football Association) Wadi Degla
4	MF	**Mahmoud Kahraba**	13 April 1994 (aged 19)			(Egyptian Football Association) ENPPI
5	DF	Yasser Ibrahim	10 February 1993 (aged 20)			(Egyptian Football Association) El Mansoura
6	DF	**Ramy Rabia**	20 May 1993 (aged 20)			(Egyptian Football Association) Al Ahly
7	MF	Ahmed Refaat	20 June 1993 (aged 20)			(Egyptian Football Association) ENPPI
8	DF	Mahmoud Metwalli	4 January 1993 (aged 20)			(Egyptian Football Association) Ismaily
9	FW	Omar Bassam	17 December 1993 (aged 19)			(Egyptian Football Association) Al Ahly
10	MF	**Saleh Gomaa**	1 August 1993 (aged 19)			(Egyptian Football Association) ENPPI
11	DF	**Mahmoud Wahid**	19 June 1994 (aged 19)			(Egyptian Football Association) ENPPI
12	MF	Ahmed Samir	25 August 1994 (aged 18)			(Egyptian Football Association) El Dakhleya
13	MF	Mahmoud Hamad	10 November 1993 (aged 19)			(Egyptian Football Association) Ismaily
14	MF	Hossam Ghaly	1 January 1993 (aged 20)			(Egyptian Football Association) Al Ahly
15	MF	Mohammed El Shami	30 September 1993 (aged 19)			(Egyptian Football Association) Al Ahly
16	GK	Mahmoud Hamdi	1 November 1993 (aged 19)			(Egyptian Football Association) Zamalek
17	DF	Osama Ibrahim	1 April 1993 (aged 20)			(Egyptian Football Association) ENPPI
18	FW	**Kouka**	5 March 1993 (aged 20)			(Portuguese Football Federation) Rio Ave
19	MF	Mohamed Sherif	5 January 1993 (aged 20)			(Egyptian Football Association) Ismaily
20	MF	**Trézéguet**	1 October 1994 (aged 18)			(Egyptian Football Association) Al Ahly
21	GK	Hassan Mahmoud	10 March 1993 (aged 20)			(Egyptian Football Association) Arab Contractors

=== England ===
Head coach: Peter Taylor

No.	Pos.	Player	Date of birth (age)	Caps	Goals	Club
1	GK	**Sam Johnstone**	25 March 1993 (aged 20)	1	0	(The Football Association) Manchester United
2	MF	**Gaël Bigirimana**	22 October 1993 (aged 19)	1	0	(The Football Association) Newcastle United
3	DF	Dan Potts	13 April 1994 (aged 19)	1	0	(The Football Association) West Ham United
4	DF	**Jon Flanagan**	1 January 1993 (aged 20)	1	0	(The Football Association) Liverpool
5	DF	**Eric Dier**	15 January 1994 (aged 19)	1	0	(Portuguese Football Federation) Sporting CP
6	MF	**Conor Coady**	25 February 1993 (aged 20)	1	0	(The Football Association) Liverpool
7	MF	**James Ward-Prowse**	4 November 1994 (aged 18)	1	0	(The Football Association) Southampton
8	MF	Larnell Cole	9 March 1993 (aged 20)	1	0	(The Football Association) Manchester United
9	FW	**Harry Kane**	28 July 1993 (aged 19)	1	0	(The Football Association) Tottenham Hotspur
10	FW	Christopher Long	25 February 1995 (aged 18)	1	0	(The Football Association) Everton
11	DF	Adam Reach	3 February 1993 (aged 20)	1	1	(The Football Association) Middlesbrough
12	GK	George Long	5 November 1993 (aged 19)	1	1	(The Football Association) Sheffield United
13	GK	Connor Ripley	13 February 1993 (aged 20)	1	0	(The Football Association) Middlesbrough
14	DF	**John Stones**	28 May 1994 (aged 19)	1	0	(The Football Association) Everton
15	DF	Jamaal Lascelles	11 November 1993 (aged 19)	1	0	(The Football Association) Nottingham Forest
16	DF	Tom Thorpe	13 January 1993 (aged 20)	1	0	(The Football Association) Manchester United
17	FW	Luke Williams	11 June 1993 (aged 20)	1	1	(The Football Association) Middlesbrough
18	MF	John Lundstram	18 February 1994 (aged 19)	1	0	(The Football Association) Everton
19	FW	Alex Pritchard	3 May 1993 (aged 20)	1	0	(The Football Association) Tottenham Hotspur
20	DF	Luke Garbutt	21 May 1993 (aged 20)	1	0	(The Football Association) Everton
21	MF	**Ross Barkley**	5 December 1993 (aged 19)	1	0	(The Football Association) Everton

=== Iraq ===
Head coach: Hakeem Shaker

No.	Pos.	Player	Date of birth (age)	Caps	Goals	Club
1	GK	**Fahad Talib**^{1}	21 October 1994 (aged 18)	1	0	(Iraq Football Association) Al-Quwa Al-Jawiya
2	DF	**Burhan Jumaah**	1 July 1996 (aged 16)	0	0	(Iraq Football Association) Al-Thawra
3	DF	**Ali Adnan**	19 December 1993 (aged 19)	8	2	(Iraq Football Association) Baghdad
4	DF	**Saad Natiq**	19 March 1994 (aged 19)	0	0	(Iraq Football Association) Al-Masafi
5	DF	**Ali Faez**	9 September 1994 (aged 18)	7	0	(Iraq Football Association) Erbil
6	MF	**Saif Salman**	1 July 1993 (aged 19)	8	0	(Iraq Football Association) Duhok
7	MF	**Jawad Kadhim**	14 October 1994 (aged 18)	7	2	(Iraq Football Association) Duhok
8	FW	**Mohannad Abdul-Raheem**	22 September 1993 (aged 19)	9	8	(Iraq Football Association) Duhok
9	MF	**Mahdi Kamel**	6 January 1995 (aged 18)	9	2	(Iraq Football Association) Al-Shorta
10	FW	**Mohammed Jabbar Shokan**	21 May 1993 (aged 20)	7	5	(Iraq Football Association) Al-Quwa Al-Jawiya
11	MF	**Humam Tariq**	10 February 1996 (aged 17)	6	0	(Iraq Football Association) Al-Quwa Al-Jawiya
12	DF	**Mohammed Jabbar Rubat**	29 June 1993 (aged 19)	9	0	(Iraq Football Association) Al-Minaa
13	FW	**Ali Qasim**	20 January 1994 (aged 19)	6	3	(Iraq Football Association) Al-Zawraa
14	DF	**Mustafa Nadhim**	23 September 1993 (aged 19)	9	0	(Iraq Football Association) Najaf
15	DF	**Dhurgham Ismail**	23 May 1994 (aged 19)	4	4	(Iraq Football Association) Al-Shorta
16	MF	**Ihab Kadhim**	1 January 1994 (aged 19)	3	0	(Iraq Football Association) Al-Talaba
17	MF	**Ammar Abdul-Hussein**	13 February 1993 (aged 20)	5	0	(Iraq Football Association) Erbil
18	MF	Hozan Ismail	16 March 1993 (aged 20)	0	0	(Iraq Football Association) Sulaymaniya
19	FW	**Farhan Shakor**	15 October 1995 (aged 17)	1	0	(Iraq Football Association) Sulaymaniya
20	GK	**Mohammed Hameed** (captain)	24 January 1993 (aged 20)	6	0	(Iraq Football Association) Al-Shorta
21	GK	**Ali Yasin**	9 August 1993 (aged 19)	0	0	(Iraq Football Association) Karbalaa

1. Fahad Talib replaced Saqr Ajeel due to injury.

== Group F ==
=== New Zealand ===
Head coach: Chris Milicich

No.	Pos.	Player	Date of birth (age)	Caps	Goals	Club
1	GK	Scott Basalaj	19 April 1994 (aged 19)			(New Zealand Football) Lower Hutt City
2	DF	**Storm Roux**	13 January 1993 (aged 20)			(Football Australia) Perth Glory
3	DF	**Bill Tuiloma**	27 March 1995 (aged 18)			(New Zealand Football) Birkenhead United
4	DF	Simon Arms	21 January 1993 (aged 20)			(New Zealand Football) Auckland City
5	DF	**Luke Adams**	8 May 1994 (aged 19)			(The Football Association) Derby County
6	MF	Tom Biss	20 January 1993 (aged 20)			(New Zealand Football) Western Suburbs FC
7	MF	**Cameron Howieson**	22 December 1994 (aged 18)			(The Football Association) Burnley
8	MF	**Tim Payne**	10 January 1994 (aged 19)			(The Football Association) Blackburn Rovers
9	FW	Hamish Watson	17 April 1994 (aged 19)			(New Zealand Football) Lower Hutt City
10	FW	**Tyler Boyd**	30 December 1994 (aged 18)			(Football Australia) Wellington Phoenix
11	FW	**Louis Fenton**	3 April 1993 (aged 20)			(Football Australia) Wellington Phoenix
12	DF	Alec Solomons	15 September 1993 (aged 19)			(New Zealand Football) Team Wellington
13	DF	Liam Higgins	27 September 1993 (aged 19)			(New Zealand Football) YoungHeart Manawatu
14	MF	Jesse Edge	26 February 1995 (aged 18)			(New Zealand Football) Ole Football Academy
15	MF	Justin Gulley	15 January 1993 (aged 20)			(New Zealand Football) Miramar Rangers
16	FW	Van Elia	1 July 1993 (aged 19)			(New Zealand Football) Wellington Olympic
17	FW	**Ryan Thomas**	20 December 1994 (aged 18)	2	0	(Royal Dutch Football Association) PEC Zwolle
18	MF	Rhys Jordan	19 October 1994 (aged 18)			(The Football Association) Bristol City
19	FW	Dale Higham	4 January 1993 (aged 20)			(New Zealand Football) Wairarapa United
20	GK	**Max Crocombe**	12 August 1993 (aged 19)			(The Football Association) Oxford United
21	GK	Daniel Clarke	12 February 1994 (aged 19)			(New Zealand Football) Team Wellington

=== Uzbekistan ===
Head coach: Akhmadjan Musaev

No.	Pos.	Player	Date of birth (age)	Caps	Goals	Club
1	GK	Asilbek Amanov	1 September 1993 (aged 19)			(Uzbekistan Football Association) Pakhtakor
2	DF	Tohirjon Shamshitdinov	9 February 1993 (aged 20)			(Uzbekistan Football Association) Guliston
3	DF	Sardor Rakhmanov	9 July 1994 (aged 18)			(Uzbekistan Football Association) Lokomotiv
4	DF	Boburbek Yuldashov	8 April 1993 (aged 20)			(Uzbekistan Football Association) Lokomotiv
5	DF	Maksimilian Fomin	21 September 1993 (aged 19)			(Uzbekistan Football Association) Pakhtakor
6	MF	Abbosbek Makhstaliev	12 January 1994 (aged 19)			(Uzbekistan Football Association) Pakhtakor
7	MF	**Vladimir Kozak**	12 June 1993 (aged 20)			(Uzbekistan Football Association) Pakhtakor
8	MF	**Diyorjon Turapov**	9 July 1994 (aged 18)			(Uzbekistan Football Association) Olmaliq
9	MF	**Jaloliddin Masharipov**	1 September 1993 (aged 19)			(Uzbekistan Football Association) Pakhtakor
10	MF	**Jamshid Iskanderov**	16 October 1993 (aged 19)			(Uzbekistan Football Association) Pakhtakor
11	FW	Abdul Aziz Yusupov	5 January 1993 (aged 20)			(Uzbekistan Football Association) Pakhtakor
12	GK	Akmal Tursunbaev	14 April 1993 (aged 20)			(Uzbekistan Football Association) Andijan
13	DF	Kamranbey Kapadze	29 January 1994 (aged 19)			(Uzbekistan Football Association) Bunyodkor
14	DF	Nodir Sanakulov	1 December 1994 (aged 18)			(Uzbekistan Football Association) Nasaf Qarshi
15	FW	Jasurbek Khakimov	24 May 1994 (aged 19)			(Uzbekistan Football Association) Pakhtakor
16	DF	Azamat Abdullaev	23 February 1994 (aged 19)			(Uzbekistan Football Association) Qizilqum Zarafshon
17	FW	**Igor Sergeev**	30 April 1993 (aged 20)			(Uzbekistan Football Association) Pakhtakor
18	MF	**Sardor Sabirkhodjaev**	6 November 1994 (aged 18)			(Uzbekistan Football Association) Bunyodkor
19	MF	**Zabikhillo Urinboev**	30 March 1995 (aged 18)			(Uzbekistan Football Association) Bunyodkor
20	MF	Mukhsinjon Ubaydullaev	15 July 1994 (aged 18)			(Uzbekistan Football Association) Pakhtakor
21	GK	Bakhodir Mirsoatov	21 October 1993 (aged 19)			(Uzbekistan Football Association) Lokomotiv

=== Uruguay ===
Head coach: Juan Verzeri

No.	Pos.	Player	Date of birth (age)	Caps	Goals	Club
1	GK	Mathías Cubero	15 January 1994 (aged 19)			(Uruguayan Football Association) Cerro
2	DF	**Emiliano Velázquez**	30 April 1994 (aged 19)			(Uruguayan Football Association) Danubio
3	DF	**Gastón Silva**	5 March 1994 (aged 19)			(Uruguayan Football Association) Defensor Sporting
4	DF	**Guillermo Varela**	24 March 1993 (aged 20)			(The Football Association) Manchester United
5	MF	Jim Varela	16 October 1994 (aged 18)			(Uruguayan Football Association) Peñarol
6	DF	Maximiliano Amondarain	22 January 1993 (aged 20)			(Uruguayan Football Association) Progreso
7	MF	Leonardo Pais	7 July 1994 (aged 18)			(Uruguayan Football Association) Defensor Sporting
8	MF	Sebastián Cristóforo	23 August 1993 (aged 19)			(Uruguayan Football Association) Peñarol
9	FW	**Diego Rolán**	24 March 1993 (aged 20)			(French Football Federation) Bordeaux
10	MF	**Giorgian de Arrascaeta**	1 June 1994 (aged 19)			(Uruguayan Football Association) Defensor Sporting
11	FW	Nicolás López	1 October 1993 (aged 19)			(Italian Football Federation) Roma
12	GK	Guillermo de Amores	19 October 1994 (aged 18)			(Uruguayan Football Association) Liverpool
13	MF	**Diego Laxalt**	7 February 1993 (aged 20)			(Italian Football Federation) Inter Milan
14	FW	Gonzalo Bueno	16 June 1993 (aged 20)			(Uruguayan Football Association) Nacional
15	DF	Federico Gino	26 February 1993 (aged 20)			(Uruguayan Football Association) Defensor Sporting
16	DF	Lucas Olaza	21 July 1994 (aged 18)			(Uruguayan Football Association) River Plate
17	MF	Gianni Rodríguez	7 June 1994 (aged 19)			(Portuguese Football Federation) Benfica
18	FW	Rubén Bentancourt	2 March 1993 (aged 20)			(Royal Dutch Football Association) PSV Eindhoven
19	DF	**José Giménez**	20 January 1995 (aged 18)			(Royal Spanish Football Federation) Atlético Madrid
20	FW	Felipe Avenatti	26 April 1993 (aged 20)			(Uruguayan Football Association) River Plate
21	GK	Washington Aguerre	23 April 1993 (aged 20)			(Uruguayan Football Association) Peñarol

=== Croatia ===
Head coach: Dinko Jeličić

No.	Pos.	Player	Date of birth (age)	Caps	Goals	Club
1	GK	Oliver Zelenika	14 May 1993 (aged 20)			(Croatian Football Federation) Rudeš
2	DF	Toni Gorupec	4 July 1993 (aged 19)			(Croatian Football Federation) Radnik Sesvete
3	DF	Ivan Aleksić	6 March 1993 (aged 20)			(Croatian Football Federation) Osijek
4	MF	Filip Mrzljak	16 April 1993 (aged 20)			(Croatian Football Federation) Lokomotiva
5	DF	Niko Datković	21 April 1993 (aged 20)			(Croatian Football Federation) Rijeka
6	DF	Josip Čalušić	11 October 1993 (aged 19)			(Croatian Football Federation) Dinamo Zagreb
7	FW	**Marko Livaja**	26 August 1993 (aged 19)			(Italian Football Federation) Atalanta
8	MF	**Hrvoje Miličević**	20 April 1993 (aged 20)			(Football Association of Bosnia and Herzegovina) Zrinjski Mostar
9	FW	Stipe Perica	7 July 1995 (aged 17)			(Croatian Football Federation) Zadar
10	MF	**Marko Pjaca**	6 May 1995 (aged 18)			(Croatian Football Federation) Lokomotiva
11	FW	**Ante Rebić**	21 September 1993 (aged 19)			(Croatian Football Federation) Split
12	GK	**Simon Sluga**	17 March 1993 (aged 20)			(Italian Football Federation) Hellas Verona
13	DF	Mato Miloš	30 June 1993 (aged 19)			(Croatian Football Federation) Cibalia
14	MF	Dario Čanađija	17 April 1994 (aged 19)			(Croatian Football Federation) Slaven Belupo
15	MF	Petar Brlek	29 January 1994 (aged 19)			(Croatian Football Federation) Slaven Belupo
16	MF	Miro Kovačić	29 August 1994 (aged 18)			(Croatian Football Federation) Hajduk Split
17	MF	Marko Pajač	11 May 1993 (aged 20)			(Croatian Football Federation) Radnik Sesvete
18	MF	Danijel Miškić	11 October 1993 (aged 19)			(Croatian Football Federation) Dinamo Zagreb
19	FW	Kruno Ivančić	18 January 1994 (aged 19)			(Croatian Football Federation) Radnik Sesvete
20	DF	Jozo Šimunović	4 August 1994 (aged 18)			(Croatian Football Federation) Dinamo Zagreb
21	GK	**Dominik Livaković**	9 January 1995 (aged 18)			(Croatian Football Federation) NK Zagreb

== Player statistics ==
Player representation by club

Players	Club(s)
10	(El Salvador) Turín FESA (Uzbekistan) Pakhtakor
7	(Cuba) La Habana
6	(Portugal) Sporting CP
5	(Australia) Newcastle Jets (Colombia) Deportivo Cali (Egypt) Al Ahly, ENPPI (England) Manchester United (England) Everton (Mexico) Guadalajara (Paraguay) Cerro Porteño, Libertad (Portugal) Benfica (Uruguay) Defensor
4	(Cuba) Villa Clara (Paraguay) Rubio Ñu (Mexico) Atlas, Santos Laguna, Monterrey; Universidad de Chile (Egypt) Ismaily (Ghana) Tema Youth (Greece) Olympiacos (South Korea) Chung-Ang University (Uruguay) Peñarol (Nigeria) Dolphins (Spain) Atlético Madrid, Barcelona, Real Madrid, Sevilla

Player representation by league

Country	Players
Total	504
England	35
Spain	24
France	22
Portugal	21
Argentina	1
Cuba	21
Egypt	20
Mexico	27
South Korea	20
Uruguay	16
Others	297

The Iraq, Uzbekistan and Cuba squads were made up entirely of players from the respective countries' domestic leagues.
