= 2013 African U-20 Championship squads =

The 2013 African Youth Championship is an international football tournament to be held in Algeria from 16 March until 30 March 2013. The semi-finalists of the competition qualify for the age restricted 2013 FIFA U-20 World Cup which requires players to be born on or after 1 January 1993. The regulations of the African Youth Championship omit any age restrictions in what appears to be an administrative error.

The 8 national teams involved in the tournament were required to submit a list of up to 40 players to the CAF administration on or before 4 February 2013 (sixty days before the first game of the final tournament).

Only 21 of the 40 players listed are authorised to take part in the final tournament. The final squad of 21 players must be submitted on or before 6 March 2013 (ten days before the first game of the final tournament). The regulations require that three of the 21 players must be goalkeepers.

== Group A ==
=== Algeria ===
Head coach: (France) Jean-Marc Nobilo

No.	Pos.	Player	Date of birth (age)	Club
1	GK	Aiyoub Belabes	21 June 1993 (aged 19)	(France) Quevilly
2	DF	Hichem Aoulmi	10 March 1993 (aged 20)	(Algeria) AC FAF
3	DF	Ayoub Abdellaoui	16 February 1993 (aged 20)	(Algeria) AC FAF
4	DF	Nazim Aklil	3 February 1994 (aged 19)	(Algeria) AC FAF
5	DF	Mokhtar Toumi	8 March 1993 (aged 20)	(France) Montpellier
6	MF	Mohamed Benkhemassa	28 June 1993 (aged 19)	(Algeria) AC FAF
7	FW	Zinedine Ferhat	1 March 1993 (aged 20)	(Algeria) USM Alger
8	DF	Mohamed Amine Madani	20 March 1993 (aged 19)	(Algeria) AC FAF
9	FW	Thomas Izerghouf	27 February 1993 (aged 20)	(France) Rennes
10	FW	Zakaria Haddouche	19 August 1993 (aged 19)	(Algeria) ASO Chlef
11	MF	Ensaad Abderrahmane	9 December 1993 (aged 19)	(Algeria) AC FAF
12	DF	Redouane Cherifi	22 February 1993 (aged 20)	(Algeria) AC FAF
13	DF	Mohamed El Amine Barka	20 March 1993 (aged 19)	(Algeria) AC FAF
14	MF	Djamel Belalem	12 August 1993 (aged 19)	(Algeria) AC FAF
15	FW	Mohamed Benkablia	2 February 1993 (aged 20)	(Algeria) AC FAF
16	GK	Nassim Torche	2 April 1993 (aged 19)	(France) Lyon Duchère
17	MF	Abderrahmane Bourdim	14 June 1994 (aged 18)	(Algeria) AC FAF
18	MF	Kenzi Zenadi	5 April 1993 (aged 19)	(France) Sedan
19	FW	Bilal Ouali	7 October 1993 (aged 19)	(France) Reims
20	MF	Abderrahmane Saighi	3 March 1993 (aged 20)	(Algeria) AC FAF
21	GK	Sofiane Kacem	11 January 1993 (aged 20)	(Algeria) AC FAF

=== Benin ===
Head coach: (Benin) Sedogbo Alohoutade

No.	Pos.	Player	Date of birth (age)	Club
1	GK	Saturnin Allagbé	22 November 1993 (aged 19)	(Benin) ASPAC
16	GK	Steve Glodjinon	18 December 1993 (aged 19)	(Benin) USS Kraké
21	GK	Hariston Hessou	30 December 1993 (aged 19)	(Benin) AS Dragons
18	DF	Dine Koukpéré	21 February 1993 (aged 20)	(Benin) USS Kraké
8	DF	Antonin Kassa	25 October 1993 (aged 19)	(Benin) ASPAC
6	DF	Nabil Yarou	16 June 1993 (aged 19)	(Benin) ASPAC
12	DF	Frédéric Hounkponou	26 December 1994 (aged 18)	(Benin) Association Sportive Oussou Saka
20	DF	Femi Adjahi	1 October 1994 (aged 18)	(Benin) Jeunesse Athlétique du Plateau
13	DF	Lazadi Fousseni	30 June 1993 (aged 19)	(Benin) ASPAC
5	MF	Mama Séïbou	28 December 1995 (aged 17)	(Benin) USS Kraké
14	MF	David Djigla	23 August 1993 (aged 19)	(Benin) Onze Createurs
7	MF	Kola Raïmi	15 June 1995 (aged 17)	(Mali) Onze Créateurs
17	MF	Jérôme Agossa	27 January 1994 (aged 19)	(Benin) Onze Createurs
15	MF	Giscard Tchato	8 December 1994 (aged 18)	(Benin) Mogas 90 FC
11	MF	Ulrich Quenum	4 April 1996 (aged 16)	(Benin) Stagiaire Botafogo
2	MF	Tokounbo Emmanuel Bamidele	6 December 1996 (aged 16)	(Benin) Jeunesse Athlétique du Plateau
9	FW	Obi Ezechiel Okotou	25 November 1994 (aged 18)	(Benin) Akanké FC
10	FW	Gbenga Daniel Lanignan	24 November 1993 (aged 19)	(Benin) Avrankou Omnisports
19	FW	Jacques Bessan	15 September 1993 (aged 19)	(Benin) USS Kraké
4	FW	Antonin Oussou	2 September 1993 (aged 19)	(Benin) Association Sportive Oussou Saka
3	FW	Wallis Debourou	18 June 1993 (aged 19)	(United States) Saint Francis Red Flash

=== Egypt ===
Head coach: (Egypt) Rabie Yassin

No.	Pos.	Player	Date of birth (age)	Club
1	GK	Mossad Awad	15 January 1993 (aged 20)	(Egypt) Ismaily
2	DF	Ibrahim El-Hadad	1 February 1993 (aged 20)	(Egypt) Wadi Degla
3	DF	Ebrahim Hassan	30 September 1993 (aged 19)	(Egypt) Al Ahly
4	FW	Kahraba	13 April 1994 (aged 18)	(Egypt) ENPPI SC
5	DF	Yasser Ibrahim	10 February 1993 (aged 20)	(Egypt) El Mansoura
6	DF	Ramy Rabia	20 May 1993 (aged 19)	(Egypt) Al Ahly
7	MF	Ahmed Refaat	20 June 1993 (aged 19)	(Egypt) ENPPI SC
8	DF	Mahmoud Metwalli	4 January 1993 (aged 20)	(Egypt) Ismaily
9	FW	Omar Bassam	17 December 1993 (aged 19)	(Egypt) Al Ahly
10	MF	Saleh Gomaa	1 August 1993 (aged 19)	(Egypt) ENPPI SC
11	FW	Ahmed Samir	25 August 1994 (aged 18)	(Egypt) El Dakhleya
12	FW	Amir Adel (Note: Jakobsen is known as Amir Adel in Egypt.)	18 March 1994 (aged 18)	(Netherlands) PSV Eindhoven
13	MF	Mahmoud Hamad	10 November 1993 (aged 19)	(Egypt) Ismaily
14	MF	Hosam Ghaly	1 January 1993 (aged 20)	(Egypt) Al Ahly
15	DF	Sherif Dabo	28 January 1994 (aged 19)	(Egypt) ENPPI SC
16	GK	Mahmoud Hamdi	1 November 1993 (aged 19)	(Egypt) Zamalek
17	DF	Ossama Ibrahim	1 April 1993 (aged 19)	(Egypt) ENPPI SC
18	FW	Koka (Note: Rio Ave F.C. have made Koka available for two games only, versus Ghana and Algeria.)	5 March 1993 (aged 20)	(Portugal) Rio Ave
19	MF	Mohamed Sherif	5 January 1993 (aged 20)	(Egypt) Ismaily
20	MF	Trezeguet	1 October 1994 (aged 18)	(Egypt) Al Ahly
21	GK	Hassan Mahmoud	10 March 1993 (aged 20)	(Egypt) Al-Mokawloon Al-Arab

=== Ghana ===
Head coach: (Ghana) Sellas Tetteh

No.	Pos.	Player	Date of birth (age)	Club
1	GK	Eric Ofori Antwi	20 November 1994 (aged 18)	(Ghana) Amidaus Professionals
12	GK	Michael Sai	24 July 1995 (aged 17)	(Ghana) Berekum Chelsea
16	GK	Felix Annan	22 November 1994 (aged 18)	(Ghana) Asante Kotoko
2	DF	Jeremiah Arkorful	30 May 1994 (aged 18)	(Ghana) Tema Youth
3	DF	Ebenezer Ofori	1 July 1995 (aged 17)	(Ghana) New Edubiase United
4	DF	Ahmed Adams	6 March 1993 (aged 20)	(Ghana) Berekum Chelsea
5	DF	Baba Mensah	20 August 1994 (aged 18)	(Israel) Neve Yosef
8	MF	Seidu Salifu	30 November 1993 (aged 19)	(Ghana) Wa All Stars
13	DF	Richmond Nketiah	28 October 1994 (aged 18)	(Ghana) Medeama FC
14	DF	Lawrence Lartey	23 March 1994 (aged 18)	(Ghana) Ashanti Gold
6	MF	Derrick Mensah	30 October 1994 (aged 18)	(Ghana) Tema Youth
7	MF	Frank Sarfo-Gyamfi	30 May 1994 (aged 18)	(South Africa) Maritzburg United
10	MF	Clifford Aboagye	11 February 1995 (aged 18)	(Italy) Udinese
11	MF	Jacob Asiedu-Apau	16 November 1994 (aged 18)	(Ghana) Medeama FC
18	MF	Michael Anaba	30 December 1993 (aged 19)	(Ghana) Asante Kotoko
19	MF	Moses Odjer	17 August 1996 (aged 16)	(Ghana) Tema Youth
20	MF	Kwame Boahene	6 July 1993 (aged 19)	(Ghana) Liberty Professionals
21	MF	Emmanuel Gyamfi	16 December 1994 (aged 18)	(Ghana) Wa All Stars
9	FW	Francis Narh	8 April 1994 (aged 18)	(Ghana) Tema Youth
15	FW	Kennedy Ashia	13 December 1993 (aged 19)	(Ghana) Liberty Professionals
17	FW	Ebenezer Assifuah	3 July 1993 (aged 19) (Note: CAF incorrectly published Assifuah's date of birth as 3 July 1998 which would make the player 14 years old.)	(Ghana) Liberty Professionals

Notes

== Group B ==
=== Democratic Republic of the Congo ===
Head coach: (France) Sébastien Migné

No.	Pos.	Player	Date of birth (age)	Club
1	GK	Cédrick Bakala Landu	26 December 1993 (aged 19)	(Democratic Republic of the Congo) CS Don Bosco
16	GK	Lorhim Diafuka	4 March 1993 (aged 20)	(France) Vannes OC
21	GK	Zwela Zeno	26 September 1995 (aged 17)	(Democratic Republic of the Congo) Brasimba
17	DF	Pierre Botayi Bomato	11 March 1993 (aged 20)	(Democratic Republic of the Congo) AS Vita Club
15	DF	Emomo Eddy Ngoyi	13 October 1993 (aged 19)	(Tunisia) US Monastir
19	DF	Ntalu Ntoto	30 April 1995 (aged 17)	(Democratic Republic of the Congo) Jogari
2	DF	Vivien Mayele	2 July 1995 (aged 17)	(Democratic Republic of the Congo) AS Vita Club
3	DF	Chris Makengo	16 March 1993 (aged 20)	(France) AJ Auxerre
5	DF	Nekadio Luyindama		(Democratic Republic of the Congo) DC Motema Pembe
12	DF	Litombo Bangala	12 April 1994 (aged 18)	(Democratic Republic of the Congo) DC Motema Pembe
8	DF	Chris Mpati	2 December 1993 (aged 19)	(Belgium) FC Brussels
20	MF	Yannick Mulenda Wa Kalenga	2 July 1995 (aged 17)	(South Africa) Ajax Cape Town
6	MF	Mukanisa Pembele	3 February 1994 (aged 19)	(Democratic Republic of the Congo) CS Don Bosco
18	MF	Kingombe Kamba	11 November 1995 (aged 17)	(Democratic Republic of the Congo) CS Don Bosco
7	FW	Budge Manzia	24 September 1994 (aged 18)	(Tunisia) ES Sahel
11	FW	Mukendi Mukenga	13 February 1993 (aged 20)	(Democratic Republic of the Congo) DC Motema Pembe
9	FW	Anthony Walongwa	15 October 1993 (aged 19)	(France) FC Nantes
4	FW	Aristote N'Dongala	19 January 1994 (aged 19)	(France) FC Nantes
10	FW	Jérémie Basilua	22 April 1993 (aged 19)	(Democratic Republic of the Congo) AS Vita Club
14	FW	Ekiri Litekia	18 September 1995 (aged 17)	(Democratic Republic of the Congo) AS Rojolu
13	FW	Chico Ushindi Wa Kubanza	14 November 1994 (aged 18)	(Democratic Republic of the Congo) CS Don Bosco

Notes

- Enoch Ekangamene was initially named in the team but his name was not listed by CAF.

=== Gabon ===
Head coach: (Gabon) Anicet Yala

No.	Pos.	Player	Date of birth (age)	Club
1	GK	Ghislain Gnassa Chongo	3 October 1994 (aged 18)	(Gabon) Sogéa FC
16	GK	Florent Rodolphe Ngouazela	28 November 1995 (aged 17)	(Gabon) Mangasport
21	GK	Kevin Mfourou Ondias	10 June 1994 (aged 18)	(Gabon) CMS
2	DF	Yann José Gnassa Mangonda	13 January 1993 (aged 20)	(Gabon) Sapins FC
3	DF	Rodrigue Bilonge	8 November 1997 (aged 15)	(Gabon) Tout Puissant Akwembe
15	DF	Guy Arnaud Boussougou	15 March 1993 (aged 20)	(Gabon) AS Pélican
13	DF	Davy Okobongo	24 August 1993 (aged 19)	(Gabon) Missile FC
17	DF	Dimitri Ngoye Abourou	18 November 1994 (aged 18)	(Gabon) Nguene Asuku
20	DF	Chatelet Nguéma Bengone	4 February 1994 (aged 19)	(Gabon) Missile FC
4	MF	Franck Engonga	26 July 1993 (aged 19)	(Gabon) Mounana FC
5	MF	Knox Ness Younga	27 April 1994 (aged 18)	(Gabon) Sogéa FC
6	MF	Junior Bayhano Aubyang	25 December 1996 (aged 16)	(Gabon) USB
7	MF	Léandre Degter Sombela Boundomba	17 September 1994 (aged 18)	(Gabon) Mounana FC
8	MF	Sauvy Ulrich Loïc Nkoussou	10 February 1993 (aged 20)	(Gabon) AS Solidarité
10	MF	Didier Ibrahim Ndong	17 June 1994 (aged 18)	(Tunisia) CS Sfaxien
18	MF	Davy Gaël Mayoungou	27 October 1993 (aged 19)	(Gabon) AC Bongoville
9	FW	Johan Giresse Nono Nani	17 October 1993 (aged 19)	(Gabon) Missile FC
11	FW	Axel Méyé	6 June 1995 (aged 17)	(Gabon) Missile FC
12	FW	Cédric Ondo Biyoghé	17 August 1994 (aged 18)	(Gabon) CMS
14	FW	Rych Mvele Ebale	24 July 1994 (aged 18)	(Gabon) CMS
19	FW	Sébastien Minko	12 July 1996 (aged 16)	(Gabon) CMS

=== Mali ===
Head coach: (Mali) Moussa Keita

No.	Pos.	Player	Date of birth (age)	Club
1	GK	Ahamadou Fofana	8 September 1994 (aged 18)	(Mali) Onze Créateurs
2	DF	Hamidou Traoré	7 October 1996 (aged 16)	(Mali) Club Olympique de Bamako
3	MF	Abdoulaye Keita	5 January 1994 (aged 19)	(France) Bastia
4	DF	Ousmane Keita	9 May 1995 (aged 17)	(Mali) ASKO
5	MF	Samba Diallo	7 October 1994 (aged 18)	(Mali) Djoliba AC
6	DF	Boubacar Diarra	18 April 1994 (aged 18)	(Democratic Republic of the Congo) Tout Puissant Mazembé
7	MF	Mahamadou Cisse	27 December 1993 (aged 19)	(Mali) Djoliba AC
8	MF	Mahamadou Denon	27 June 1993 (aged 19)	(Mali) Jeanne D'Arc
9	FW	Adama Niane	16 June 1993 (aged 19)	(France) FC Nantes
10	FW	Aboubacar Ibrahima Toungara	15 November 1994 (aged 18)	(Mali) Centre Salif Keita
11	MF	Tiécoro Keita	13 April 1994 (aged 18)	(France) Guingamp
12	DF	Mahamadou Traoré	31 December 1994 (aged 18)	(Mali) AS Bakaridjan
13	DF	Issaka Samake	20 October 1994 (aged 18)	(Mali) Stade Malien de Bamako
14	MF	Adama Marico	31 December 1994 (aged 18)	(Mali) ASKO
15	MF	Wally Diabate	7 November 1993 (aged 19)	(Mali) Club Olympique de Bamako
16	GK	Aly Yirango	1 January 1994 (aged 19)	(France) Marseille
17	FW	Adama Traoré	5 May 1995 (aged 17)	(Mali) Club Olympique de Bamako
18	FW	Famoussa Koné	3 May 1994 (aged 18)	(France) Bastia
19	FW	Modibo Konte	13 April 1994 (aged 18)	(Mali) Club Olympique de Bamako
20	MF	Boubakary Diarra	30 August 1993 (aged 19)	(Italy) Torino FC
21	GK	Germain Berthé	24 October 1993 (aged 19)	(Mali) Onze Créateurs

Notes

- Bakary Nimaga of Skenderbeu Korce in Albania was named in the original squad.

=== Nigeria ===
Head coach: (Nigeria) John Obuh

No.	Pos.	Player	Date of birth (age)	Club
1	GK	Samuel Okani	11 February 1994 (aged 19)	(Nigeria) Enyimba
16	GK	Jonah Usman	10 October 1993 (aged 19)	(Nigeria) ABS
21	GK	Emmanuel Daniel	17 December 1993 (aged 19)	(Nigeria) Enugu Rangers
2	DF	Aigbe Oliha	2 November 1993 (aged 19)	(Tunisia) Esperance Sportive de Zarzis
3	DF	Mohammed Goyi Aliyu	12 February 1993 (aged 20)	Unattached
4	DF	Abdullahi Shehu	12 March 1993 (aged 20)	(Nigeria) Kano Pillars
5	DF	Chizoba Amaefule	28 October 1994 (aged 18)	(Nigeria) Dolphins
6	DF	Ikechukwu Okorie	18 November 1993 (aged 19)	(Nigeria) Enyimba
13	DF	Kingsley Madu	12 December 1995 (aged 17)	(Nigeria) El-Kanemi Warriors
20	DF	Abubakar Hassan	12 March 1994 (aged 19)	(Nigeria) Wikki Tourists
7	MF	Aminu Umar	6 March 1995 (aged 18)	(Nigeria) Wikki Tourists
10	MF	Abdul Jeleel Ajagun	10 February 1993 (aged 20)	(Nigeria) Dolphins
12	MF	Ovbokha Agboyi	14 December 1994 (aged 18)	(Nigeria) Bayelsa United
17	MF	Chidi Osuchukwu	11 October 1993 (aged 19)	(Nigeria) Dolphins
19	MF	Henry Uche Agbo	4 December 1995 (aged 17)	(Nigeria) Enyimba
15	MF	Moses Orkuma	19 July 1994 (aged 18)	(Nigeria) Lobi Stars
8	FW	Bright Ejike	1 January 1993 (aged 20)	(Nigeria) Heartland
9	FW	Kayode Olarenwaju	8 May 1993 (aged 19)	(Turkey) Ansfed Utd
11	FW	Alhaji Gero	10 October 1993 (aged 19)	(Nigeria) Enugu Rangers
14	FW	Christian Pyagbara	13 March 1996 (aged 17)	(Nigeria) Sharks
18	FW	Edafe Egbedi	5 August 1993 (aged 19)	(Denmark) AGF-Aarhus
