= HNK Zmaj Makarska =

Croatian football club

HRNK Zmaj
- Full name: Hrvatski Radnicki Nogometni Klub Zmaj
- Founded: 1921
- Ground: Gradski sportski centar, Makarska
- Capacity: 3,000
- Chairman: Marko Ožić Bebek
- Manager: Goran Šušnjara
- League: Treća HNL South
- 2021-2022: Treća HNL South, 13th
Home colours	Away colours

HRNK Zmaj is a professional Croatian football club based in the town of Makarska.

== History ==
HRNK Zmaj was founded in 1921. The first club president was Tonči Vuzio. From 1993 to 1996 the club sponsor NK Zmaj-Euroherc's name was written on the players' jerseys on their jerseys.

== Achievements ==
HRNK Zmaj became a member in the regional sub-association in 1922. In 1949 the town won the Dalmatian Cup. It was three times a champion in the regional sub-association. During 1954–55 it participated in qualifying for entry into the 2nd league, but failed. In 1968–69 the club achieved its greatest success playing in the former second National League – South, but managed to play only one season.

== Current squad ==
Note: Flags indicate national team as defined under FIFA eligibility rules; some limited exceptions apply. Players may hold more than one non-FIFA nationality.

No.	Pos.	Nation	Player
—	GK	CRO	Josip Bartulic
—	FW	CRO	Ivan Brkulj
—	MF	CRO	Stipe Juric
—	FW	CRO	Josip Gojak
—	DF	CRO	Ivan Salinovic
—	MF	CRO	Damir Rasic
—	DF	CRO	Danijel Rasic
—	DF	CRO	Matej Lozina
—	FW	BRA	Philco
—	FW	CRO	Darko Tomas
—	MF	CRO	Miro Kovacic

No.	Pos.	Nation	Player
—	MF	CRO	Stipe Brnic
—	DF	CRO	Josip Bauk
—	FW	BIH	Sevko Okic
—	DF	CRO	Ante Sokol
—	MF	CRO	Josip Rakic
—	DF	CRO	Marin Bozic
—	MF	CRO	Petar Kovacevic
—	DF	CRO	Leo Novak
—	DF	CRO	Nikola Mihanovic
—	MF	CRO	Stipe Serdarevic
—	MF	CRO	Antonio Rudelj
