= Leopold Novak =

Croatian footballer

Personal information
- Date of birth: 3 December 1990 (age 35)
- Place of birth: Makarska, Croatia
- Height: 1.85 m (6 ft 1 in)
- Position: Defender

Team information
- Current team: Zmaj Makarska

Youth career
- –2008: Zmaj Makarska

Senior career*
Years	Team	Apps	(Gls)
2008–2010	Zmaj Makarska	36	(5)
2010–2011	Hrvatski Dragovoljac	11	(1)
2011–2012	Lučko	26	(4)
2012	Cibalia	4	(0)
2013	Lučko	11	(0)
2013	Sint-Truiden	12	(2)
2013	Hrvatski Dragovoljac	2	(0)
2014–2015	Zagreb	9	(2)
2015	Brașov	13	(0)
2015–2016	Zmaj Makarska		
2016	Vitez	14	(1)
2016–2017	Poli Timișoara	19	(0)
2017	Vitez	10	(0)
2018	Pajde		
2019	Neuenhof		
2020	Klingnau		
2020	Spreitenbach		
2020	Urania BV		
2021-	Zmaj Makarska		
- * Club domestic league appearances and goals as of 6 February 2018

Leopold Novak (born 3 December 1990) is a Croatian professional footballer who plays as a defender for Zmaj Makarska.

== Career ==
He played in the Premier League of Bosnia and Herzegovina for NK Vitez. He joined Urania Baška Voda from Swiss amateur side Spreitenbach in August 2020.
