= Danijel Rašić =

Croatian footballer

Personal information
- Full name: Danijel Rašić
- Date of birth: 5 October 1988 (age 38)
- Place of birth: Split, SFR Yugoslavia
- Height: 1.79 m (5 ft 10 1/2 in)
- Position: Right back

Team information
- Current team: Zmaj Makarska

Youth career
- Zmaj Makarska
- Hajduk Split

Senior career*
Years	Team	Apps	(Gls)
2007–2008	Mosor	27	(0)
2008–2010	Imotski	52	(0)
2010–2011	Split	0	(0)
2011–2012	Varaždin	15	(0)
2012–2013	Zmaj Makarska	21	(2)
2013	Imotski	12	(0)
2014–2015	Krka	46	(2)
2015–2016	Zmaj Makarska	?	(?)
2016	Imotski	12	(1)
2016–2017	Metalleghe-BSI	30	(2)
2017–	Zmaj Makarska		

International career
2005	Croatia U17	1	(0)
2006–2007	Croatia U19	6	(0)
- * Club domestic league appearances and goals as of 3 January 2018

Danijel Rašić (born 5 October 1988 in Split) is a Croatian football player currently playing for HNK Zmaj Makarska in the Croatian Third Football League.

== Career ==
Rašić started his career, alongside his identical twin brother Damir, in their hometown club Zmaj Makarska, before moving on to the Hajduk Split academy. Despite alleged interest from Panathinaikos, and games for the Croatia U19 team, the brothers didn't get contracts with Hajduk Split, and signed with the Druga HNL team Mosor. After a season there they both moved to Imotski, and Danijel stayed for two seasons before rejoining his brother at the Prva HNL team RNK Split.

Not getting a chance at Split, he moved on to Varaždin, playing there until the club was suspended. In the summer of 2012 Rašić rejoined his first club Zmaj Makarska in the Treća HNL Jug for a season, followed by another half-season stint at Imotski at the same level. At the beginning of 2014, Rašić joined the Slovenian PrvaLiga team Krka.
