= Miro Kovačić =

Croatian association football player

Personal information
- Full name: Miro Kovačić
- Date of birth: 29 August 1994 (age 32)
- Place of birth: Split, Croatia
- Height: 1.82 m (6 ft 0 in)
- Position: Midfielder

Youth career
- 2005–2013: Hajduk Split

Senior career*
Years	Team	Apps	(Gls)
2012–2014	Hajduk Split	2	(0)
2013–2014	→ Omiš (loan)	11	(0)
2013–2014	→ Solin (loan)	22	(3)
2014	Znojmo	15	(3)
2015	Hrvatski Dragovoljac	10	(1)
2016	Zmaj Makarska	15	(6)
2016–2018	1. FC Köln II	24	(0)
2018–2019	GOŠK Gabela	20	(0)
2019	Solin	13	(0)
2020	NK Pajde Möhlin	1	(0)
2020–2021	Zmaj Makarska	43	(3)
2022–2023	Kamen Podbablje	42	(21)
2023	Zmaj Makarska	15	(4)
2024–	Kamen Podbablje		

International career^{‡}
2008	Croatia U14	2	(0)
2009	Croatia U15	2	(0)
2009–2010	Croatia U16	9	(0)
2010–2011	Croatia U17	10	(0)
2012	Croatia U18	1	(0)
2013	Croatia U19	6	(0)
2013	Croatia U20	2	(0)
- * Club domestic league appearances and goals as of 14 February 2024 ‡ National team caps and goals as of 14 February 2024

Miro Kovačić (born 29 August 1994 in Croatia) is a Croatian footballer.
