= Frank Sarfo-Gyamfi =

Ghanaian footballer (born 1994)

Personal information
- Date of birth: 30 May 1994 (age 32)
- Place of birth: Kumasi
- Height: 1.73 m (5 ft 8 in)
- Position: Right wing

Senior career*
Years	Team	Apps	(Gls)
2012	Wa All Stars		
2012–2014	Maritzburg United	20	(3)
2016–2019	Asante Kotoko		
2019–2020	Al-Suqoor		

International career^{‡}
2013	Ghana U20		
2016–2017	Ghana U23	6	(2)
Medal record
Bronze Medal u20 2013 (Turkey)
- * Club domestic league appearances and goals as of 9 October 2015 ‡ National team caps and goals as of 2015

Frank Sarfo-Gyamfi (born 30 May 1994) is a Ghanaian footballer who plays as a winger.

He has previously played for Wa All Stars in Ghana and Maritzburg United from South Africa. In 2013, he was called up to the Ghana Under 20 national team for the 2013 African Youth Championship. In 2016, he made his debut in the u23 Olympic Games qualifiers against Mozambique in Maputo.
