= Harrison Mojica =

Colombian footballer (born 1993)

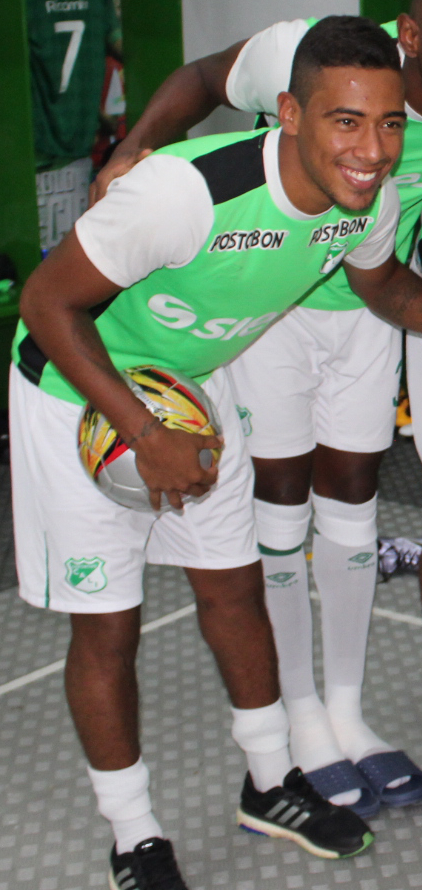

Personal information
- Full name: Harrison Arley Mojica Betancourt
- Date of birth: February 17, 1993 (age 33)
- Place of birth: Palmira, Colombia
- Height: 1.68 m (5 ft 6 in)
- Position: Midfielder

Youth career
- Deportivo Cali

Senior career*
Years	Team	Apps	(Gls)
2011–2019	Deportivo Cali	56	(3)
2017	→ Cortuluá (loan)	4	(0)
2018	→ Atlético Bucaramanga (loan)	9	(0)
2019	→ Jaguares de Córdoba (loan)	35	(5)
2020	Jaguares de Córdoba	15	(2)
2021	Millonarios	33	(3)
2022	9 de Octubre	4	(0)
2022–2023	Alianza Petrolera	39	(7)

International career
2013	Colombia U20	13	(0)
- * Club domestic league appearances and goals as of 19:34, 7 November 2023 (UTC)

Harrison Arley Mojica Betancourt (born 17 February 1993) is a Colombian footballer who plays as a midfielder and is currently a free agent, after having played last for Colombian Categoría Primera A club Alianza Petrolera.

== Club career ==
=== Deportivo Cali ===
Mojica participated in his first Clásico Vallecaucano on 15 March 2012, in a match where América de Cali defeated Deportivo Cali 1–0 in the Copa Postobón. In January 2014, Deportivo Cali beat Atlético Nacional 4–3 on penalties, to be crowned champions of the 2014 Superliga. On 7 June 2015, Deportivo Cali won the Torneo Apertura, beating Independiente Medellín 2–1 in the final. In December 2016, it was confirmed that Mojica was not going to be part of coach Mario Yepes' plan for the 2017 season.

==== Loans to Cortuluá, Atlético Bucaramanga and Jaguares de Córdoba ====
In January 2017, Mojica joined Cortuluá for the 2017 season. He then joined Atlético Bucaramanga for the 2018 season. For the 2019 season, he joined Jaguares de Córdoba. At the end of the 2020 season, Mojica had his contract terminated, becoming a free agent.

=== Millonarios ===
On 6 January 2021, Mojica signed with Millonarios on a free transfer. He made his debut in a 1–0 victory against Envigado.

=== 9 de Octubre ===
On 24 December 2021, Mojica joined Ecuadorian club 9 de Octubre on a free transfer, signing a one-year contract.

=== Alianza Petrolera ===
On 18 June 2022, Mojica returned to Colombia joining Alianza Petrolera on a one-year contract. A year later, on 20 June 2023, the club announced the departure of Mojica.

== Career statistics ==
=== Club ===
As of 7 November 2023

Appearances and goals by club, season and competition
Club	Season	League			National Cup		Continental (Note: Appearances in Copa Libertadores and Copa Sudamericana)		Other (Note: Appearance in Superliga Colombiana)		Total	
Club	Season	Division	Apps	Goals	Apps	Goals	Apps	Goals	Apps	Goals	Apps	Goals
Deportivo Cali	2011	Categoría Primera A	0	0	1	0	0	0	—		1	0
Deportivo Cali	2012	Categoría Primera A	6	0	7	0	0	0	—		13	0
Deportivo Cali	2013	Categoría Primera A	22	2	8	1	0	0	—		30	3
Deportivo Cali	2014	Categoría Primera A	7	0	7	1	1	0	1	0	16	1
Deportivo Cali	2015	Categoría Primera A	4	0	1	0	0	0	—		5	0
Deportivo Cali	2016	Categoría Primera A	17	1	0	0	2	0	—		19	1
Deportivo Cali	Total		56	3	24	2	3	0	1	0	84	5
Cortuluá (loan)	2017	Categoría Primera A	4	0	2	0	—		—		6	0
Atlético Bucaramanga (loan)	2018	Categoría Primera A	9	0	4	1	—		—		13	1
Jaguares de Córdoba (loan)	2019	Categoría Primera A	35	5	1	0	—		—		36	5
Jaguares de Córdoba	2020	Categoría Primera A	15	2	0	0	—		—		15	2
Millonarios	2021	Categoría Primera A	33	3	2	0	—		—		35	3
9 de Octubre	2022	Ecuadorian Serie A	4	0	0	0	2	0	—		6	0
Alianza Petrolera	2022	Categoría Primera A	19	4	0	0	—		—		19	4
Alianza Petrolera	2023	Categoría Primera A	20	3	0	0	—		—		20	3
Alianza Petrolera	Total		39	7	0	0	0	0	0	0	39	7
Career total			195	20	33	3	5	0	1	0	234	23

== Honours ==
=== Deportivo Cali ===
- Copa Colombia: 2010
- Superliga Colombiana: 2014
- Categoría Primera A: 2015 Apertura

=== Colombia ===
- South American Youth Football Championship: 2013
