= Fatih Turan =

Footballer (born 1993)

Personal information
- Full name: Fatih Nurullah Turan
- Date of birth: 5 April 1993 (age 33)
- Place of birth: Genk, Belgium
- Height: 1.75 m (5 ft 9 in)
- Position: Right-back

Team information
- Current team: Turkse Rangers
- Number: 26

Youth career
- 2008–2010: Genk

Senior career*
Years	Team	Apps	(Gls)
2010–2015	Fortuna Sittard	73	(1)
2015–2017	Boluspor	4	(0)
2018	Van BB	8	(0)
2018–2019	Karacabey	12	(0)
2019–2020	Sporting Hasselt	17	(0)
2020–	Turkse Rangers		

International career
2013	Turkey U20	3	(0)
2013	Turkey U21	1	(0)
- * Club domestic league appearances and goals as of 15 January 2026

Fatih Nurullah Turan (born 5 April 1993) is a footballer who plays as a right-back for Turkse Rangers. Born in Belgium, he represented Turkey at international youth levels.

== Club career ==
He made his Eerste Divisie debut for Fortuna Sittard on 18 March 2011.

== International career ==
Turan represented Turkey at the 2013 FIFA U-20 World Cup.
