= Teodoro Paredes =

Paraguayan footballer (born 1993)

Personal information
- Full name: Teodoro Paul Paredes Pavón
- Date of birth: 1 April 1993 (age 33)
- Place of birth: Caaguazú, Paraguay
- Height: 1.85 m (6 ft 1 in)
- Position: Defender

Team information
- Current team: Unión Comercio
- Number: 3

Senior career*
Years	Team	Apps	(Gls)
2011–2019	Cerro Porteño	30	(0)
2015	→ Sol de América (loan)	27	(0)
2016	→ Rubio Ñu (loan)	4	(0)
2016–2017	→ Atlético de Rafaela (loan)	22	(0)
2018–2019	→ Newell's Old Boys (loan)	14	(1)
2019–2020	Bolívar	21	(2)
2020	Sportivo San Lorenzo	4	(0)
2021	Wilstermann	0	(0)
2022–23	Cumbayá	47	(4)
2024–	Unión Comercio	25	(1)

International career
- Paraguay U17
2013	Paraguay U20	9	(0)
- * Club domestic league appearances and goals as of 20:30, 24 November 2019 (UTC)

Teodoro Paul Paredes Pavón (born 1 April 1993) is a Paraguayan professional footballer who plays as a defender for Unión Comercio.

== Career ==
=== Club ===
Paredes started his senior football career in Paraguay with Cerro Porteño, he made his debut for the team on 18 May 2011 in a Paraguayan Primera División draw with Guaraní. He made another six appearances in the 2011 season before making zero in 2012. Eighteen league matches followed for Paredes in 2013 and 2014 though, prior to him leaving Cerro Porteño on loan to join Sol de América. He participated in twenty-seven top-flight fixtures for Sol de América before returning to his parent club. Ahead of the 2016 season, Paredes completed a loan move to fellow Primera División team Rubio Ñu.

However, he returned to Cerro Porteño in May 2016 after just four appearances for Rubio Ñu. Notably, Parades was sent off in his final Rubio Ñu game; vs. Guaraní. Upon arriving back home, he was sent out on loan once again as this time he agreed to sign for Argentine Primera División club Atlético de Rafaela for the 2016–17 campaign. His debut came on 28 August in a league match with Atlético Tucumán. July 2017 saw Paredes go back to Cerro Porteño, where he subsequently featured twice more for the club before leaving on loan for a fourth time in July 2018. Newell's Old Boys loaned him on 30 July.

=== International ===
Parades played for Paraguay U17s and Paraguay U20s at international level. He won nine caps for the U20s, with three of those nine matches coming at the 2013 FIFA U-20 World Cup in Turkey.

== Career statistics ==
As of April 18 2024.

Club statistics
Club	Season	League			Cup (Note: Includes the Copa Argentina and Copa Paraguay)		League Cup		Continental (Note: Includes the Copa Libertadores and Copa Sudamericana)		Total	
Club	Season	Division	Apps	Goals	Apps	Goals	Apps	Goals	Apps	Goals	Apps	Goals
Cerro Porteño	2011	Paraguayan Primera División	7	0	—		—		0	0	7	0
Cerro Porteño	2012	Paraguayan Primera División	0	0	—		—		0	0	0	0
Cerro Porteño	2013	Paraguayan Primera División	16	0	—		—		4 (Note: Two appearances in 2013 Copa Libertadores, two appearances in 2013 Copa Sudamericana)	0	20	0
Cerro Porteño	2014	Paraguayan Primera División	2	0	—		—		0	0	2	0
Cerro Porteño	2015	Paraguayan Primera División	0	0	—		—		0	0	0	0
Cerro Porteño	2016	Paraguayan Primera División	0	0	—		—		0	0	0	0
Cerro Porteño	2017	Paraguayan Primera División	2	0	—		—		0	0	2	0
Cerro Porteño	2018	Paraguayan Primera División	3	0	0	0	—		0	0	3	0
Cerro Porteño	Total		28	0	0	0	—		4	0	32	0
Sol de América (loan)	2015	Paraguayan Primera División	27	0	—		—		—		27	0
Rubio Ñu (loan)	2016	Paraguayan Primera División	4	0	—		—		—		4	0
Atlético de Rafaela (loan)	2016–17	Argentine Primera División	22	0	2	0	—		—		24	0
Newell's Old Boys (loan)	2018–19	Argentine Primera División	14	1	1	0	2	0	—		17	1
Bolívar	2019	Bolivian Primera División	19	1	—		—		—		19	1
Bolívar	2020	Bolivian Primera División	2	1	—		—		2	0	4	1
Bolívar	Total		21	2	0	0	0	0	2	0	23	2
Sportivo San Lorenzo	2020	Paraguayan Primera División	4	0	—		—		—		4	0
Jorge Wilstermann	2021	Bolivian Primera División	0	0	—		—		3	0	3	0
Cumbayá	2022	Ecuadorian Serie A	20	1	—		—		—		20	1
Cumbayá	2023	Ecuadorian Serie A	27	3	—		—		—		27	3
Cumbayá	Total		47	4	0	0	0	0	0	0	47	4
Unión Comercio	2024	Peruvian Primera División	11	0	—		—		—		11	0
Career total			180	7	3	0	2	0	9	0	194	7

== Honours ==
Cerro Porteño

- Paraguayan Primera División: 2013 Clausura
