= Jacob Asiedu-Apau =

Ghanaian professional footballer

Jacob Asiedu Apau (born 12 October 1994) is a Ghanaian professional footballer who plays as a midfielder for Ghanaian Premier League side Ashanti Gold.

== Club career ==
=== Medeama SC ===
Asiedu-Apau started his career with Medeama S.C. In June 2013, moved to Armenian top flight side Shirak SC. He later returned to club to play for them until 2015. In March 2014, he went on trial to Italian club Parma but could not secure a deal. He again returned to feature for Medeama after a 3-year absence in March 2018, after travelling to Italy in seek of greener pastures. He played for the club from 2018 to 2020 till he secured a move to Obuasi-based club Ashanti Gold.

==== Shirak SC (loan) ====
In June 2013, he signed a 1-year loan deal with Armenian top flight side Shirak SC. He went on to play for the club for 6 months and returned to Medeama. He featured in 2013–14 UEFA Champions League, playing in both legs of Shirak's second qualifying round against Partizan, in the process making his UEFA Champions League debut.

He made his debut on 17 July 2013, coming on as a 69th-minute substitute for Davit Hakobyan. The match ended in a 1–1 draw. In the second leg, he also came on in the 76th minute for Andranik Barikyan, with the matching ending in a goalless draw and Partizan qualifying on away goals.

=== Ashanti Gold ===
In July 2020, Asiedu-Apau signed for Ashanti Gold ahead of the 2020–21 Ghana Premier League. He was also a member of the squad that featured in the 2020–21 CAF Confederation Cup.

== International career ==
Asiedu-Apau has been capped at the youth level for the Ghana national under-20 football team. He was selected to be part of the 25-man squad to go on camp and a training tour of Italy and Spain ahead of the African Youth Championship. He was a member of the U-20 squad which clinched silver at the 2013 African Youth Championship in Algeria in 2013.

== Honours ==
Medeama

Ghanaian FA Cup: 2015

Ghana U20

- African U-20 Championship runner-up: 2013
