= Alberto Gurrola =

Mexican footballer and goalkeeper coach (1993–2022)

Personal information
- Full name: Alberto Gurrola Castro
- Date of birth: 9 March 1993
- Place of birth: Hermosillo, Sonora, Mexico
- Date of death: 25 June 2022 (aged 29)
- Height: 1.77 m (5 ft 10 in)
- Position: Goalkeeper

Youth career
- 2008–2013: Atlas

Senior career*
Years	Team	Apps	(Gls)
2012–2014	Atlas	0	(0)
2013–2014	→ Lobos BUAP (loan)	5	(0)
2014–2015	Cimarrones de Sonora	2	(0)

International career
2011–2013	Mexico U20		

Managerial career
- 2016–2019: Mexico U17 (goalkeeper coach)
- 2017–2019: Mexico U18 (goalkeeper coach)
- 2020–2021: Mexico (goalkeeper coach)
- 2021–2022: Mexico Women (goalkeeper coach)
- * Club domestic league appearances and goals

Alberto Gurrola Castro (9 April 1993 – 25 June 2022) was a Mexican professional footballer and goalkeeper coach.

== Playing career ==
Gurrola started his career at Club Atlas Fuerzas Básicas, the academy of CF Atlas and made his professional debut on loan with Lobos BUAP on 22 August 2013 during a 4–1 Copa MX loss to Veracruz. In summer 2014 he joined Cimarrones de Sonora, before retiring in summer 2015.

In 2013 Gurrola played for the Mexico U23 national team at the 2013 Toulon Tournament and in the same year, he was backup at the FIFA U-20 World Cup in Turkey, for the Mexico U20.

== Coaching career ==
After his playing career Gurrola worked as goalkeeper coach for the Mexico U17, Mexico U18, Mexico men's and Mexico women's national teams.

== Personal life ==
His younger brother José Gurrola who followed his brother's footsteps.

== Death ==
Gurrola died on June 25, 2022, at the age of 29 from cancer.
