= Mohamed Sherif (footballer, born 1993) =

Egyptian footballer

Personal information
- Full name: Mohamed Sherif Ahmed
- Date of birth: 5 January 1993 (age 33)
- Place of birth: Egypt
- Height: 1.75 m (5 ft 9 in)
- Position: Attacking midfielder

Team information
- Current team: Ismaily SC

Senior career*
Years	Team	Apps	(Gls)
2010–	Ismaily SC	20	(0)

International career
2012–	Egypt U20		
- * Club domestic league appearances and goals

Mohamed Sherif Ahmed is an Egyptian footballer who plays for Ismaily SC in the Egyptian League. He plays as a midfielder. In 2013 Rabie Yassin, coach of the Egyptian national U-20 team, called him up to be a member of the Egypt Under 20 national team for the 2013 African Youth Championship in Algeria.
