= Ousmane Keita =

Malian footballer

Personal information
- Full name: Ousmane Keita
- Date of birth: 9 May 1994 (age 32)
- Place of birth: Mali
- Height: 6 ft 2 in (1.88 m)
- Position: Defender

Team information
- Current team: El Nasr

Youth career
- –2013: AS Korofina

Senior career*
Years	Team	Apps	(Gls)
2013–2014	Djoliba AC		
2014–	Smouha	5	(0)
2015–	El Nasr	1	(0)
- * Club domestic league appearances and goals

Ousmane Keita is a Malian professional footballer, who plays as a defender for El Nasr.

== International career ==
In January 2014, coach Djibril Dramé, invited him to be a part of the Mali squad for the 2014 African Nations Championship. He helped the team to the quarter-finals where they lost to Zimbabwe by two goals to one.
